= Ryen =

Neighborhood of Oslo, Norway

Coordinates: 59.895°N 10.804°E

Ryen is a neighborhood in the borough Nordstrand. Residential development of the area in the late 1950s was spurred by the opening of the Lambertseter Line.

== Transportation ==
Ryen
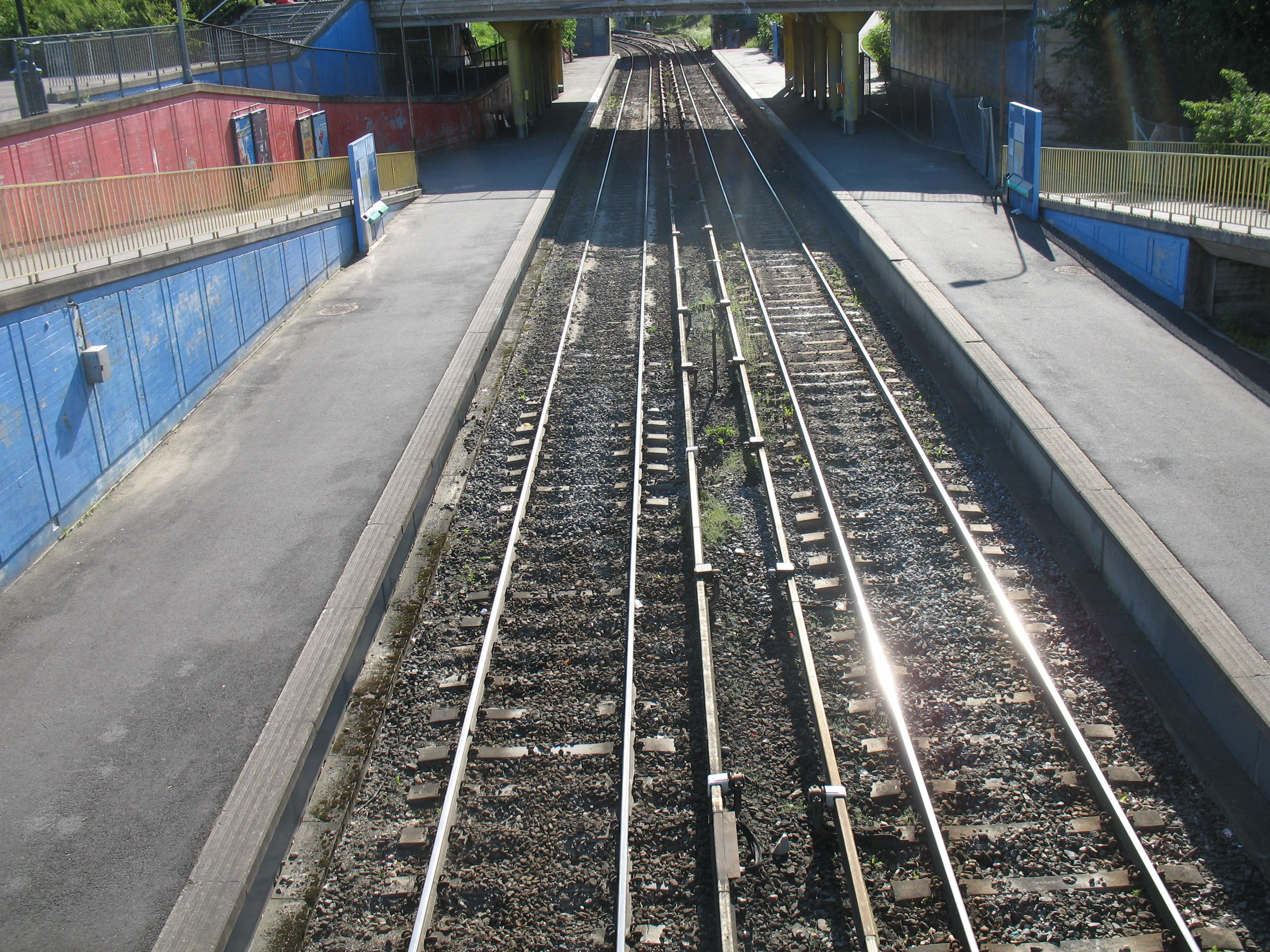

General information
- Location: Nordstrand, Oslo; Norway
- Elevation: 124.0 m (406.8 ft)
- Owner: Sporveien
- Operator: Sporveien T-banen
- Line: Lambertseter Line
- Distance: 6.7 km (4.2 mi) from Stortinget
- Connections: 23 Lysaker — Simensbråten; 70 Nationaltheatret — Skullerud; 71A (Jernbanetorget) — Mortensrud — Bjørndal; 515 Ski stasjon 4N Jernbanetorget — Bergkrystallen; 70N Jernbanetorget — Bjørndal

Construction
- Structure type: At-grade
- Accessible: Yes

History
- Opened: 28 April 1957
Location

Ryen station on the Lambertseter Line of the Oslo Metro is situated where the metro crosses the E6 highway. It was originally opened as a tram stop in 1957 before being upgraded to a metro station in 1966. Edgar Smith Berentsen was the station's architect. The station was upgraded in 2010.

The eastern depot of the rapid transit system, Ryen Depot, is located at Ryen and serves as a workshop and train yards for the subway company

Until 1967, Ryen was also served by Simensbråten of the Oslo Tramway.

Ryen is the eastern end of the Ring 3 beltway.

| Preceding station | Oslo Metro | Following station |
|---|---|---|
| Manglerud towards Frognerseteren | Line 1 | Brattlikollen towards Bergkrystallen |
| Manglerud towards Vestli | Line 4 | Brattlikollen towards Bergkrystallen |
