= Karlsrud (station) =

Oslo metro station

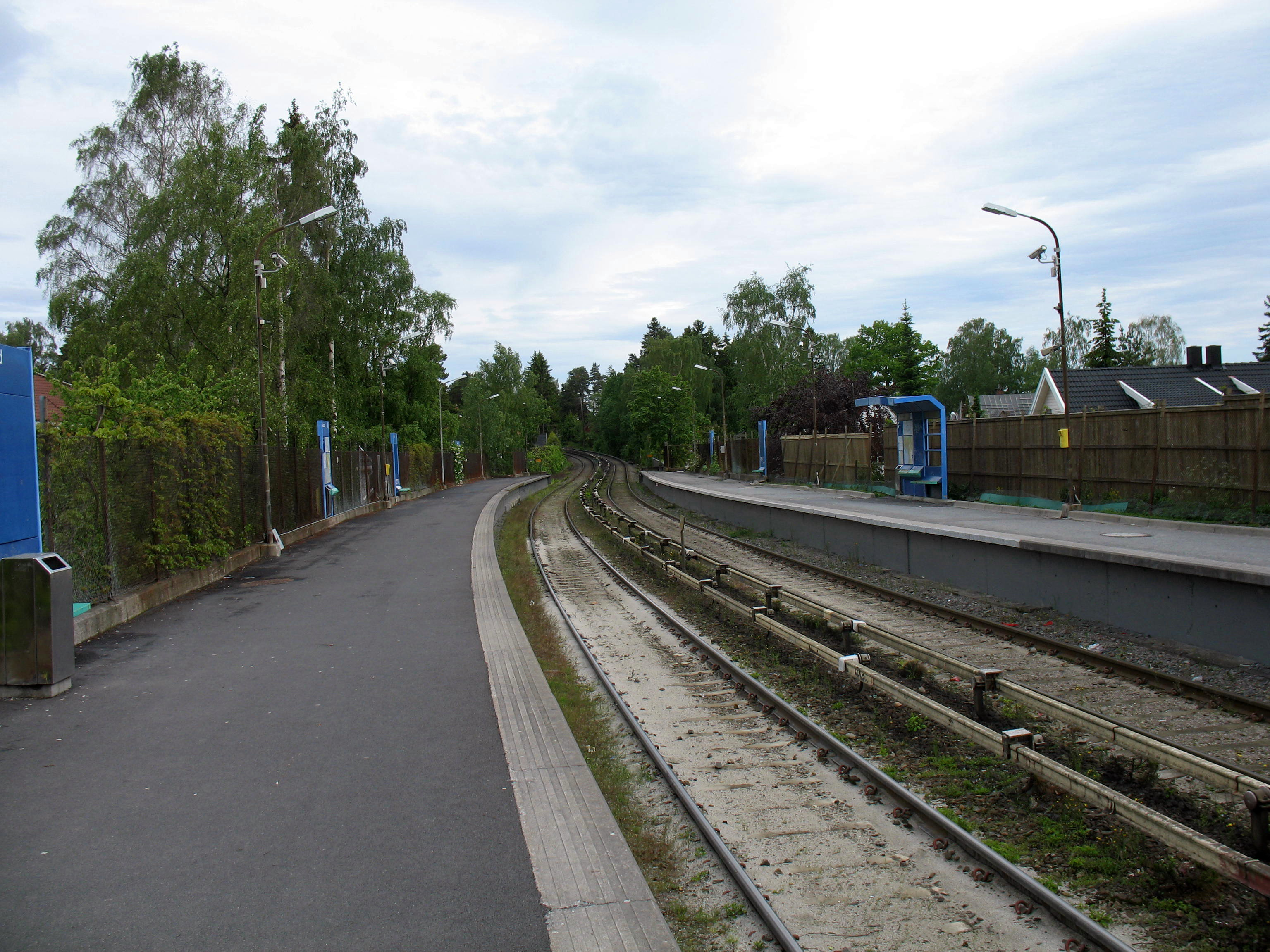

General information
- Location: Lambertseter, Oslo; Norway
- Coordinates: 59°52′47″N 10°48′19″E
- Owner: Sporveien
- Operator: Sporveien T-banen
- Line: Lambertseter Line
- Distance: 8.6 km (5.3 mi) from Stortinget

Construction
- Structure type: At-grade
- Accessible: Yes

History
- Opened: 28 April 1957
Location

Karlsrud is a station on Lambertseter Line (line 4) of the Oslo Metro, on the north side of Lambertseter. The station is between Brattlikollen and Lambertseter, 8.6 kilometers (5.3 mi) from Stortinget. The station was opened on 28 April 1957 as a tramway and 22 May 1966 as a metro. The station's architect was Guttorm Bruskeland.

Preceding station	Oslo Metro	Following station
Brattlikollen towards Frognerseteren	Line 1	Lambertseter towards Bergkrystallen
Brattlikollen towards Vestli	Line 4	Lambertseter towards Bergkrystallen
