= OS T1000 =

Oslo Metro rolling stock type

T1000 / T1300
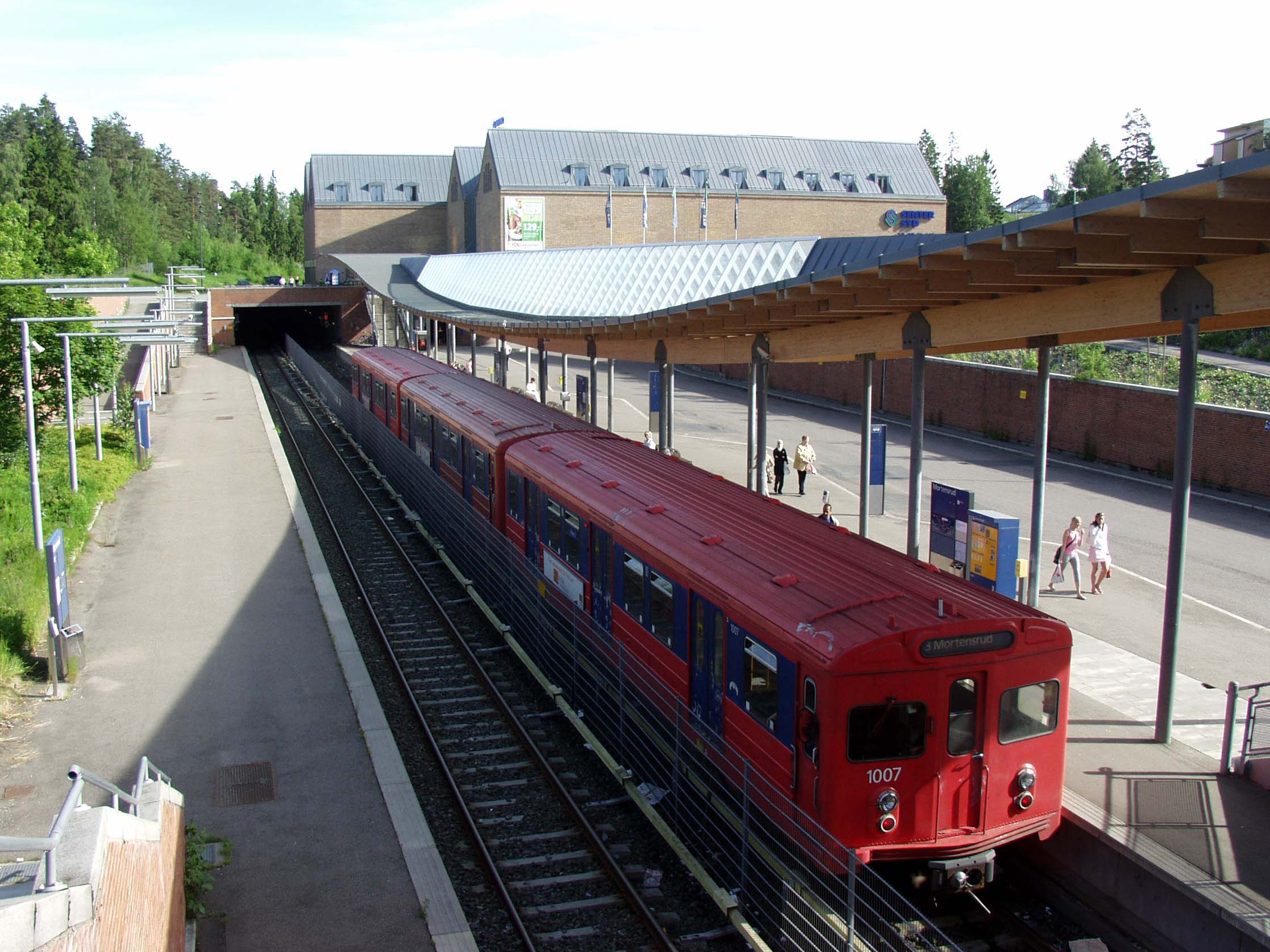
- A T1000 unit at Mortensrud.
- In service: 1966–2010
- Manufacturer: Strømmens Verksted, NEBB, Høka and AEG
- Constructed: 1960–1976 (T1000); 1978–1981 (T1300)
- Refurbished: 1985–1989 (modification of 16 T1000 cars to T1300 cars); 1995–1998 (interior and exterior refurbishment of all cars)
- Scrapped: 1983–2011
- Number built: 211 (162 × T1000, 49 × T1300)
- Number preserved: 11 cars (7 T1000 cars, 4 T1300 cars)
- Number scrapped: 200
- Formation: 2–6 cars per trainset
- Fleet numbers: 1001–1162, 1301–1349
- Capacity: 154–180
- Operators: Oslo T-banedrift
- Depots: Avløs, Majorstuen, Ryen
- Lines served: All Oslo Metro lines (except Kolsås Line and Holmenkollen Line for T1000)

Specifications
- Car length: 17 m (55 ft 9 in)
- Width: 3.2 m (10 ft 6 in)
- Height: 3.65 m (12 ft 0 in)
- Doors: 3 per side (6 per car)
- Wheel diameter: 820 mm (32 in)
- Maximum speed: 70 km/h (43 mph)
- Weight: 29.74 t (29.27 long tons; 32.78 short tons)
- Traction motors: 4 × 98 kW (131 hp)
- Power output: 392 kW (526 hp)
- Electric system(s): T1000: 750 V DC third rail; T1300: 750 V DC third rail / overhead lines
- Current collector(s): T1000: Contact shoe; T1300: Contact shoe / pantograph
- UIC classification: Bo′Bo′
- Safety system(s): ATP
- Coupling system: Scharfenberg
- Track gauge: 1,435 mm (4 ft 8 1/2 in) standard gauge

T1000 and T1300 were two rapid transit train classes used on Oslo Metro in Oslo, Norway. The 197 cars were built by Strømmens Verksted, Norsk Elektrisk & Brown Boveri and AEG between 1960 and 1981. They were the first metro trains used in Oslo, and had remained in active use until being replaced by OS MX3000 trains in 2007. Each car was equipped with a driver's cab at one or both ends and four motors, each with 98 kilowatts (131 horsepower). The cars were 17 metres (55 feet 9 inches) long, 3.2 metres (10 feet 6 inches) wide and 3.65 metres (12 feet 0 inches) tall. The trains used 750 V current, and were capable of 70 kilometres per hour (43 miles per hour). Signaling was provided through automatic train protection.

In 1960, two less powerful T single-car units were built, designed to be prototypes used on the Oslo Tramway. After a one-year trial, they were put into scheduled traffic to the Kolsås Line, where they remained in regular service until 1983. The production series was somewhat different in design and performance. T1000 was both used to refer to the class as a whole, or the first 162 cars, that are only equipped with third-rail shoes. They have four slight variations, which have been given the designations T1–T4. The T1300 was a series of 33 new and sixteen rebuilt T4 trains equipped with pantographs which previously allowed them operate on the western part of the network, prior to it being upgraded to third-rail metro standards. The newer units were designated T5 and T6, while the rebuilt units were designated T7 and T8.

== History ==
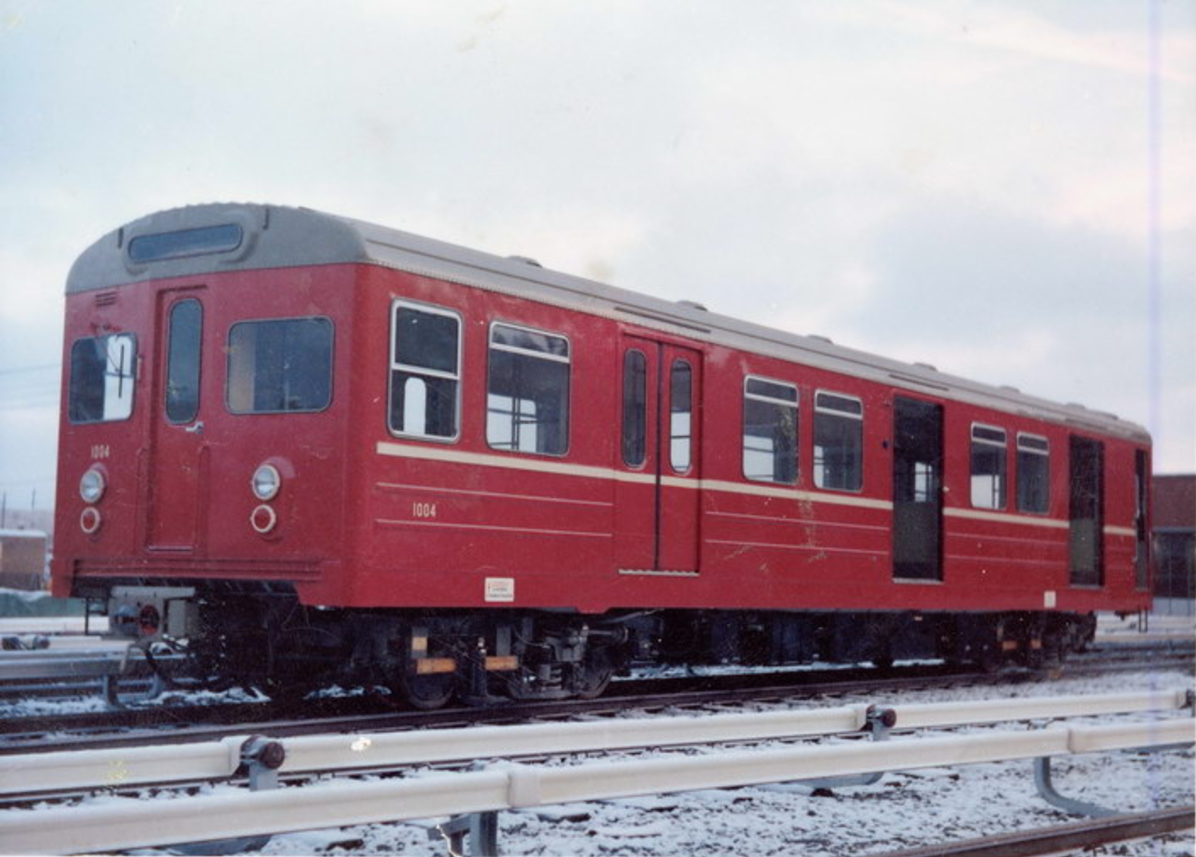
A T1000 car in original livery at Ryen Depot in 1965

In 1954, the Oslo City Council decided to build a four-line metro to the new suburbs to the east of the city center. The plans would lead to the system opening in 1966, after the conversion of the Østensjø and the Lambertseter Line of the Oslo Tramway to metro standard, and supplemented with the new Furuset and Grorud Line. The system would feature higher and longer platforms, allowing step-free access to six-car trains, automatic train protection and third rail power supply. This would make the metro incompatible with the existing tramways.

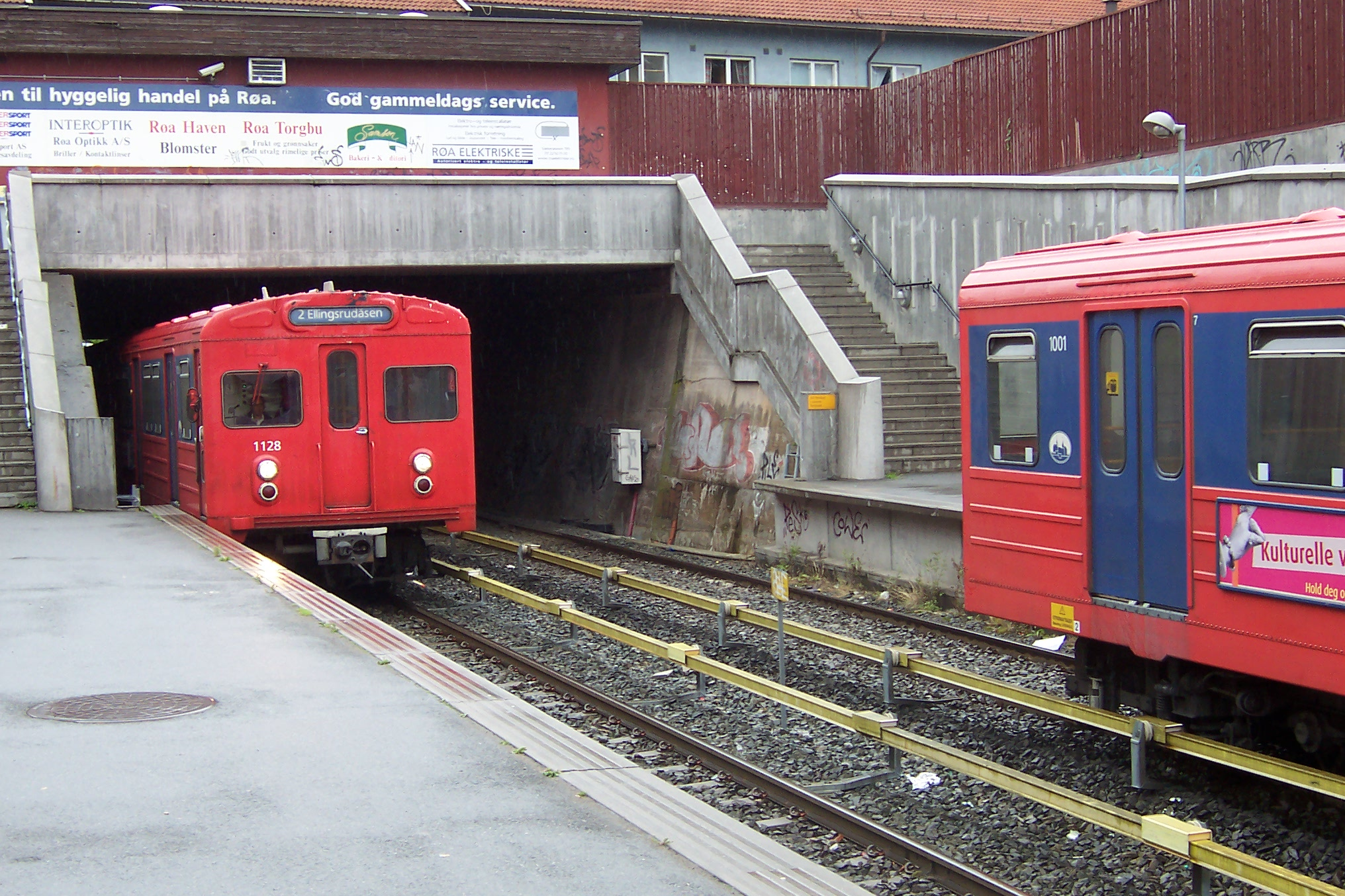
Two T1000s at Røa

The first two single-car trains were delivered in 1959 and given the designation T. They were delivered by Strømmens Værksted and NEBB as prototypes, without compensation from the planning office. They were tested on the Østensjø and Lambertseter Lines until 1 December 1960, when they were transferred to Bærumsbanen, who used them on the Kolsås Line. During their service they were prone to technical problems, and were more in the depot than in service. However, they gave valuable knowledge for the serial production. The trains were originally painted silver with a dark-blue cheatline and numbered 1 and 2. About 1970, they were repainted dark blue with a silver cheatline, and in 1971 given the numbers 451 and 452. The latter remained in service until 1977, when it was put aside, and scrapped in 1987. The former remained in service until it was put aside as defect, although it had rarely been used since 1982. It was fixed up and made operational again 1993, but was withdrawn the same year and scrapped the following year.

Serial production started in 1964, with the bodies built at Strømmens Værksted, the motors built by NEBB and the electrical equipment by AEG. By 1978, 162 cars had been delivered to Oslo Sporveier. These were manufactured in four series, named T1 through T4, with varying specifications. T1 was manufactured in 90 units from 1964 to 1966 for the opening of the Grorud Line and the conversion of the Lambertseter Line. The first 30 have driver's cabs in both directions (designated T1-2), while the latter 60 have it in only one end (designated T1-1). In 1967, 15 T2s were built for the conversion of the Østensjø Line. Although given a new designation, they are in all ways identical to the T1-1s. From 1969 to 1972, 30 T3s were built for the Furuset Line. Further expansions of the lines resulted in 37 T4s being built from 1976 to 1978. The T1000s are numbered 1001–1162.

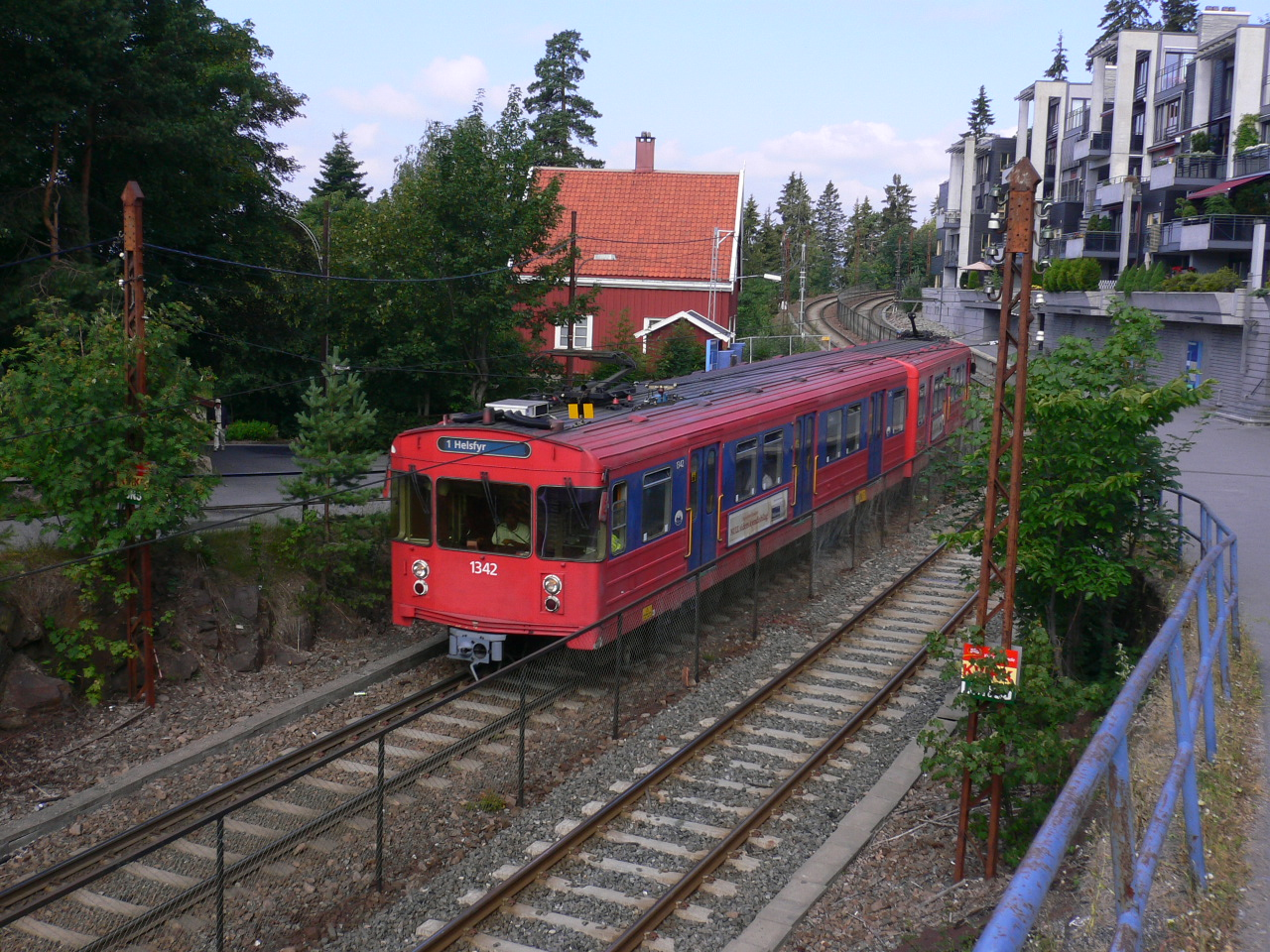
T1300 unit at Holmenkollen

The need for new rolling stock on the western suburban tramways prompted Oslo Sporveier to order a modified version to the T1000. This was because they had plans to connect the eastern and western networks, and gradually convert the western lines to metro standard. The T1300 units were built with the same specifications as the T1000, but were also equipped with pantographs so they could operate on the light rail lines. They also had a slightly different front. The initial order was for 33 units, which were designated T5 and T6. The former 18 units had a cab in one end, while the latter 15 had a cab in both ends, allowing Oslo Sporveier to operate single-car trains. The new units were put into service on the Røa and Sognsvann Lines, and were also used on the Kolsås Line outside rush-hour.

To replace the aging Class C trains, from 1985 to 1987, ten T4s were converted to T1300. They were equipped with a pantograph, received a new front and the doors were moved. Six additional T4s were converted in 1989, and given the designation T8. These only had the pantographs equipped and kept the same front and door arrangement. With the introduction of the T1300, the western lines could remove the conductor and have single-manned trains with the motorman selling tickets. The T1300-units have had better regularity than the older models they replaced. However, because they are designed for a closed system with automatic train protection, the braking systems are not sufficiently dimensioned for when the drivers use line of sight to regulate the speed and distances between trains. The 1300 units were numbered 1301–1349. After the conversions, Oslo Sporveier operated 49 T1300-cars and 146 T1000-cars. The trains were originally painted red with a beige cheatline.

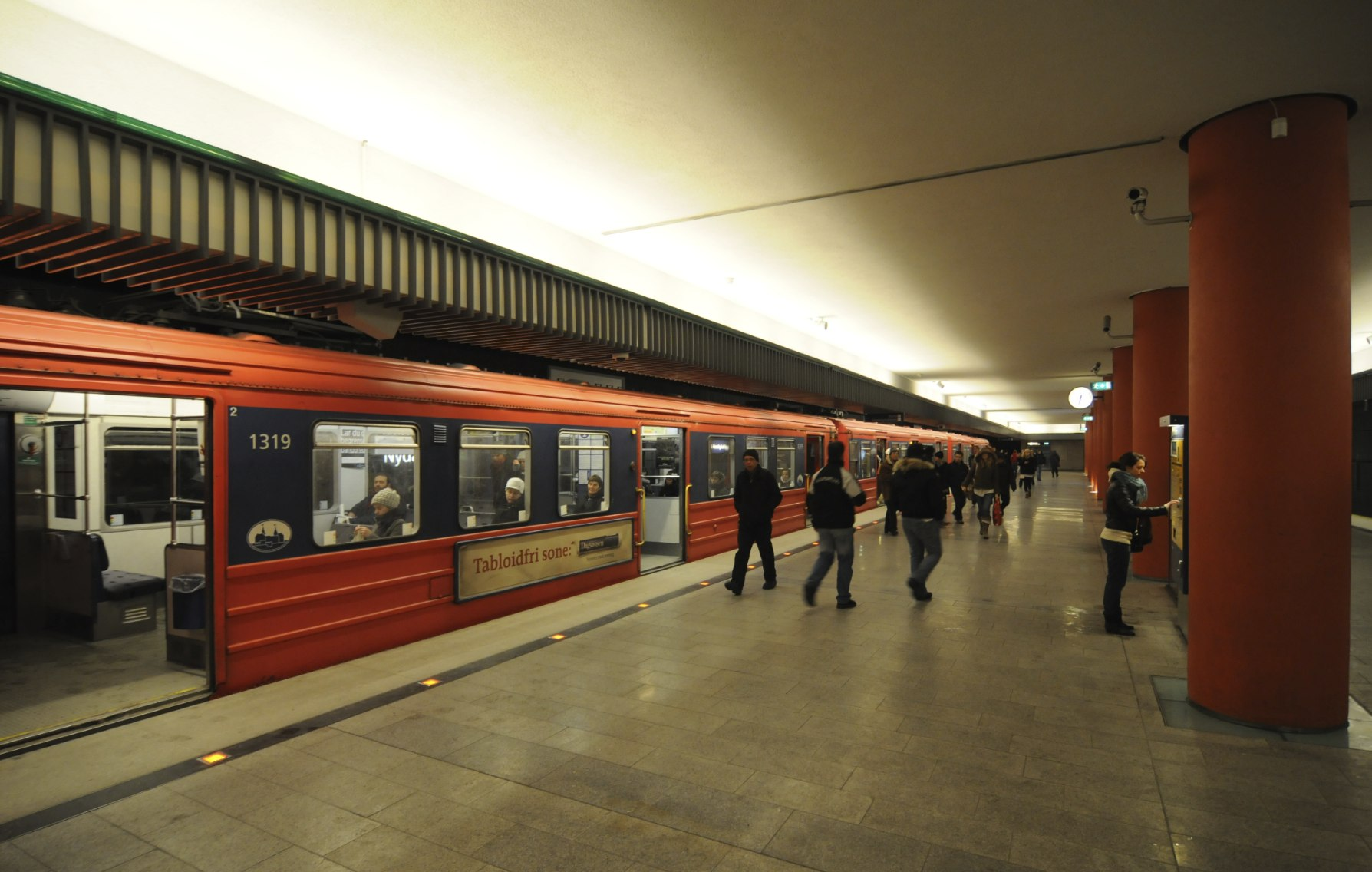
T1300 unit at Nydalen

The Sognsvann Line was finished upgraded to metro standard on 7 January 1993, allowing the first T1000 trains to operate through the Common Tunnel into the western network, converting parts of the Oslo Tramway to metro. The Røa Line was finished on 19 November 1995, allowing all trains from the east to operate through the city center. To have sufficient metro-compatible trains, six two-car T2000 units were bought, and during the mid-1990s were considered to be a possible replacement for the T1000s. Starting in 1995, Oslo Sporveier made an interior and livery upgrade to the T1000 trains. The main red color to the exterior was kept, but the doors and around the windows were painted blue. The lights and seats were changed, and the latter colored gray. The interior walls were painted red at the end, white on the sides, blue on the doors and received yellow hand bars.

Oslo City Council decided in 2003 to order 33 new three-car units from Siemens, that would be designated MX3000. In 2005, the city council voted to replace all existing T1000 and T1300 stock with the MX3000, increasing the order by another 30 units. Following a labor dispute in 2006, it was decided that all rolling stock belonging to Oslo Sporveier would be transferred to a new holding company, Oslo Vognselskap.

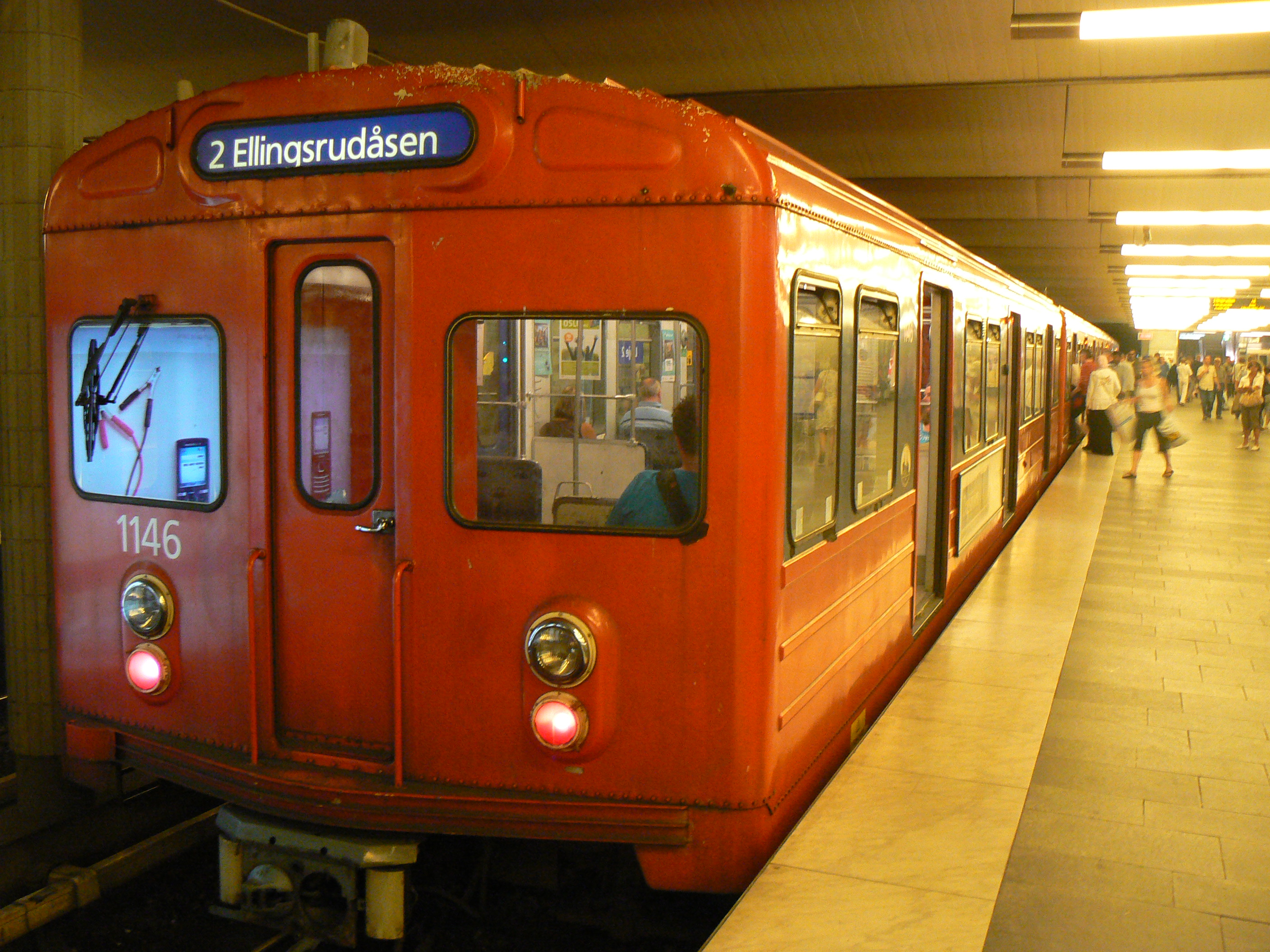
T1000 unit at Jernbanetorget

The first deliveries of the MX3000 were made in April 2007. The first T1000 was scrapped on 14 March 2007, and the last T1000 train was run on 19 July 2009. Oslo Tramway Museum has preserved seven T1000 cars: numbers 1002 (T1-2), 1018 (T1-2), 1076 (T1-1), 1089 (T1-1), 1092 (T2), 1129 (T3) and 1141 (T4). 1089 is displayed in the museum, the other six cars are meant to be kept as an operative train. Of the T1000 units, no. 1076 was the one to run the furthest, reaching 2,974,076 kilometres (1,848,005 mi) before retirement. On 22 April 2010, the last T1300 was taken out of service, leaving only MX3000 units in service. Oslo Tramway Museum has preserved three T1300 cars: numbers 1306 (T5), 1320 (T6) and 1335 (T7, originally T4 no. 1155). The three cars are meant to be kept as an operative train. No T8 car was preserved.

== Specifications ==
All versions have identical bodies, that are 17 meters (55 ft 9 in) long, 3.2 meters (10 ft 6 in) wide and 3.65 meters (12 ft 0 in) high. Each car is equipped with two bogies, each with two axles. The axle distance is 2.17 meters (7 ft 1 in), the bogie distance is 11 meters (36 ft 1 in) and the wheel diameter is 82 centimeters (2 ft 8 in). They are each equipped with four 98-kilowatt (131 hp) motors from NEBB, giving a maximum speed of 70 km/h (43 mph). They each weigh 27.740 tonnes (27.302 long tons; 30.578 short tons). The electrical equipment was delivered by AEG.

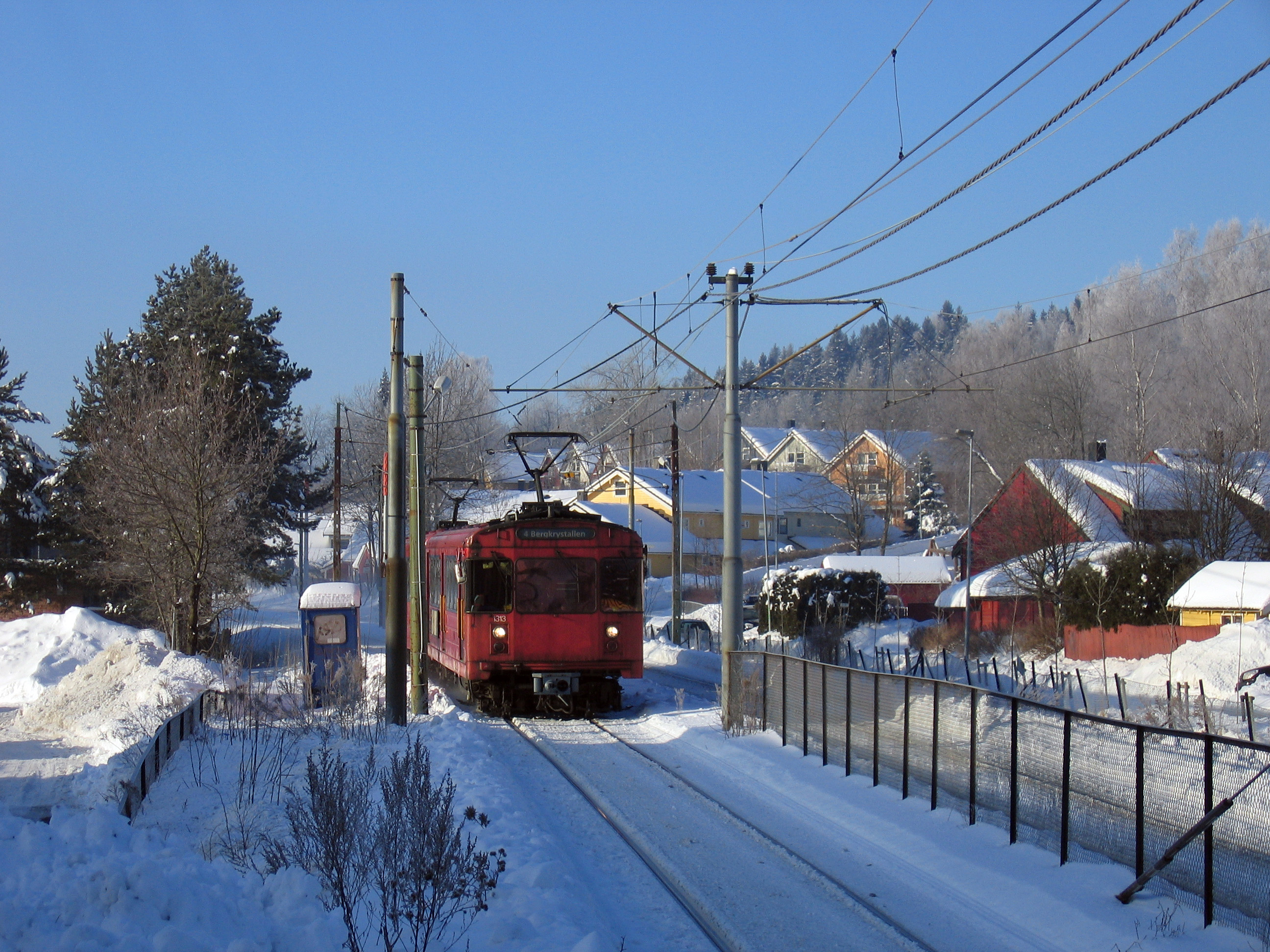
T1300 unit near Valler

The train's speed is controlled by an ATP system. The speed codes are transferred from the ATP points in the infrastructure, using 75 hertz pulses in the tracks. The trains pick up the signals via antennas. The speed codes are 15 km/h (9 mph), 30 km/h (19 mph), 50 km/h (31 mph) and 70 km/h (43 mph). The permitted speeds are presented to the driver via displays in the driver's cab; in addition, the system will automatically reduce the speed, should the limit be exceeded. The driver can put the trains in an automatic mode, where the train adjusts its own speed to match the speed limit. The driver is always responsible for starting and stopping the train at stations.

The prototype T series consisted of two single-car units. It had the same dimensions as the T1000 and T1300, but had four 75-kilowatt (101 hp) motors and weighed only 26.5 tonnes (26.1 long tons; 29.2 short tons). They were equipped with a pantograph and were bi-directional, but lacked ATP and third rail shoes. For the T1000-series, the T1-2 are the only to have a cab on both ends, although this is also featured on the T6. Since the T3, the trains have been delivered with electromagnetic brakes in addition to dynamic brakes, hand brakes and air brakes with. Models from T4 and onwards have larger cabs.

The T1300 differ in that they had a pantograph and were built for conductors. The seating varies between the models: T1000 has a total capacity of 180 passengers, of which 63 can be seated. T5 has the same total capacity, but 70 people can be seated. T6 has a capacity for 154 people, of which 64 can be seated. T7 and T8 have a capacity for 177 passengers, of which 60 can be seated. All models are capable of operating six cars in multiple, although they are commonly used in shorter configurations.
