= Brynseng (station) =

Oslo metro station

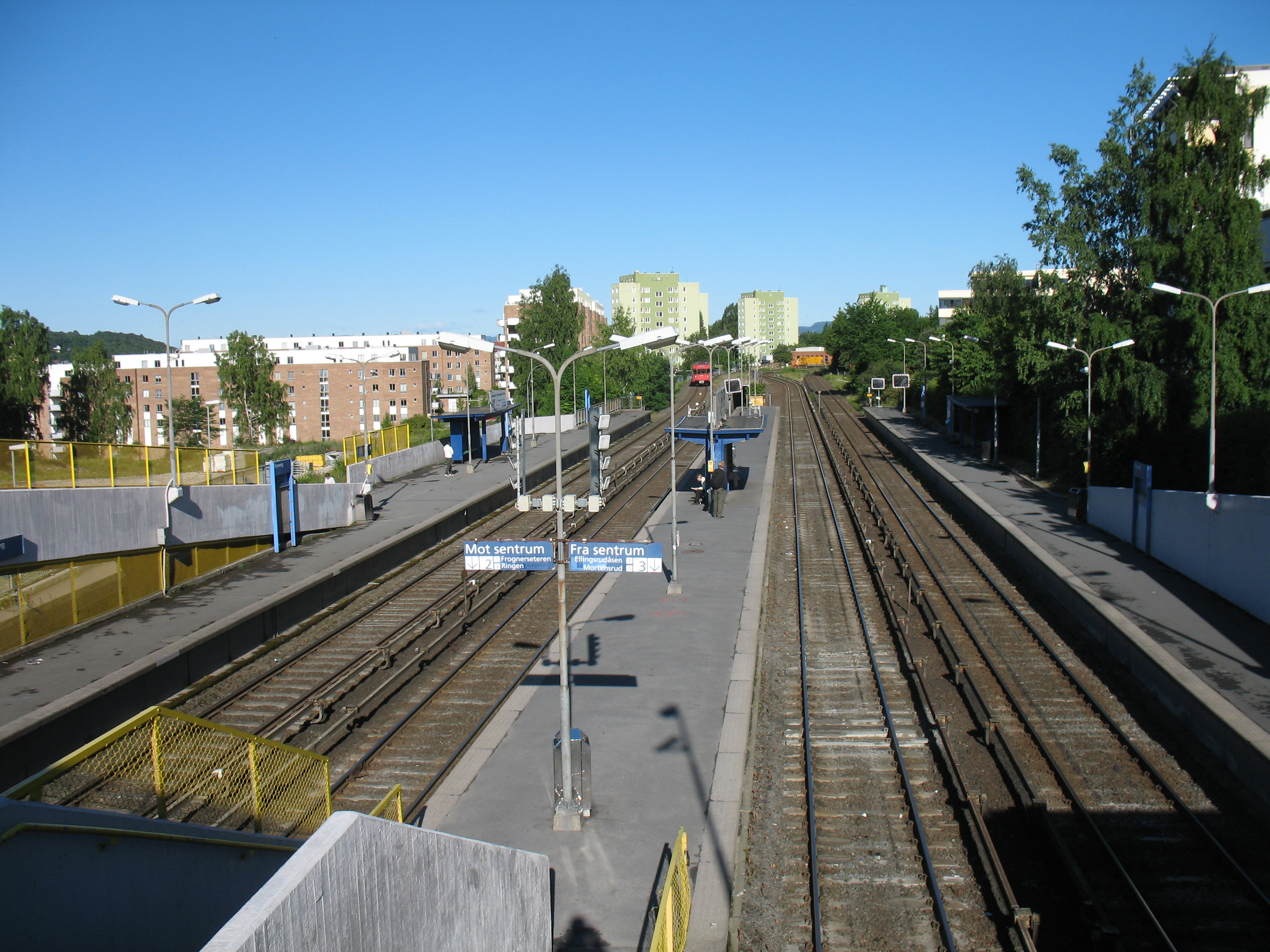

General information
- Location: Bryn, Helsfyr, Oslo; Norway
- Coordinates: 59°54′33″N 10°48′45″E
- Elevation: 84.6 m (278 ft)
- Owner: Sporveien
- Operator: Sporveien T-banen
- Lines: Furuset Line; Østensjø Line; Lambertseter Line
- Distance: 4.6 km (2.9 mi) from Stortinget
- Connections: Bus: 23 Lysaker- Simensbråten; 24 Fornebu; 3N Jernbanetorget - Skullerud; 4N Jernbanetorget - Bergkrystallen

Construction
- Structure type: At-grade
- Accessible: Yes

History
- Opened: 22 May 1966; 60 years ago
Location

Brynseng is a rapid transit station on the Oslo Metro system located in the Helsfyr borough. The station is shared by three lines, the Østensjø Line (Line 3), the Furuset Line (Line 2) and the Lambertseter Line (Line 1 and 4). The station has four platforms. The two northernmost platforms are for trains on the Østensjø- and Furuset Line. The Lambertseter Line uses the two other platforms before turning south and leaving the other two lines. At Brynseng Station is one of the train yards for the metro operator Oslo T-banedrift.

Preceding station	Oslo Metro	Following station
Helsfyr towards Frognerseteren	Line 1	Høyenhall towards Bergkrystallen
Helsfyr towards Østerås	Line 2	Hellerud towards Ellingsrudåsen
Helsfyr towards Kolsås	Line 3	Hellerud towards Mortensrud
Helsfyr towards Vestli	Line 4	Høyenhall towards Bergkrystallen
