= Ryen Depot =

Railway depot in Oslo, Norway

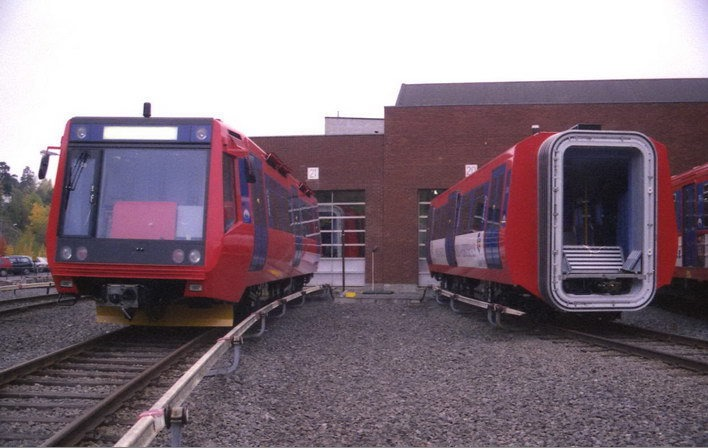
A split unit T2000 at Ryen Depot in 1994.

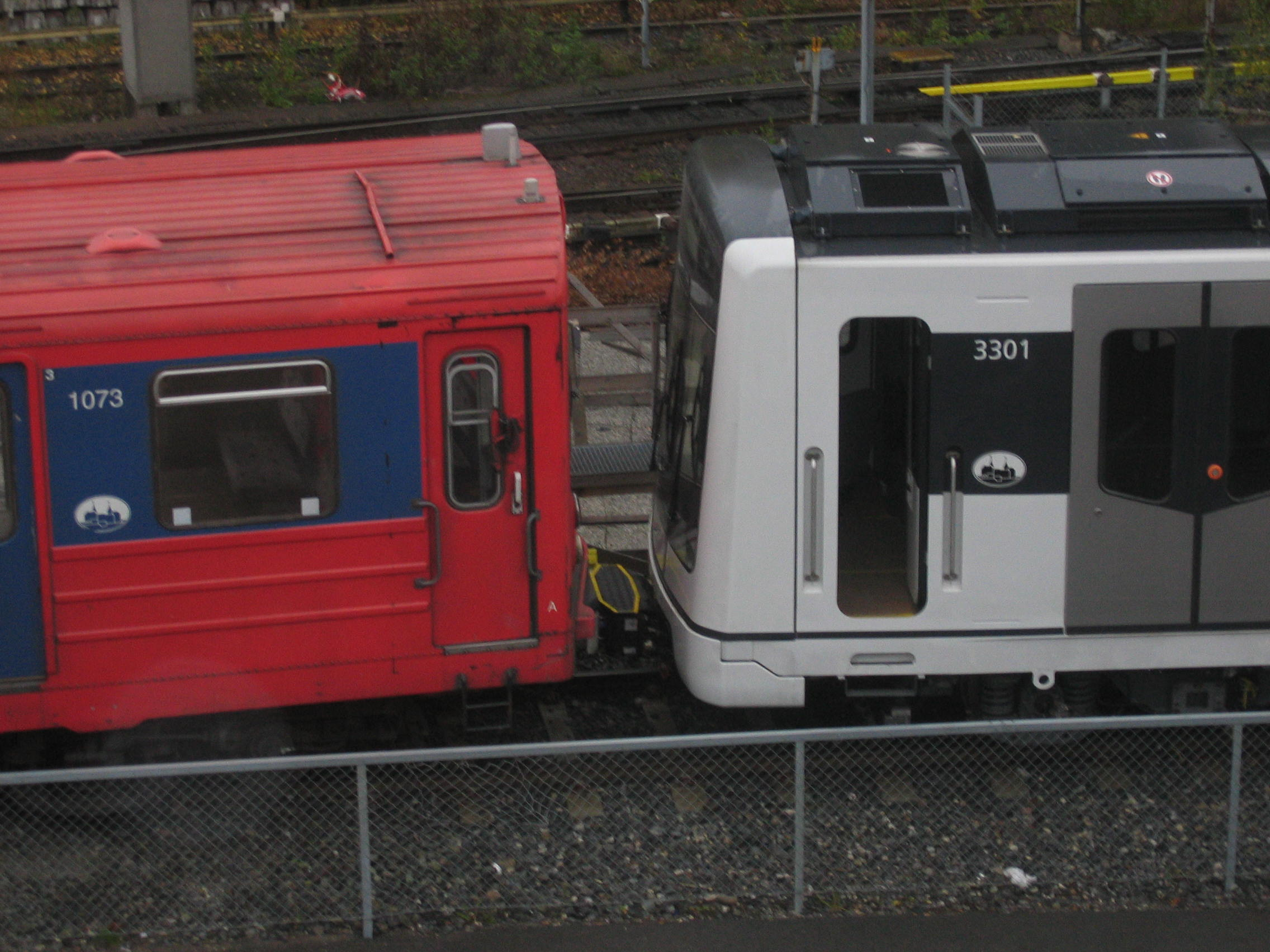
A T1000 train (left) coupled to a MX3000 train (right) at Ryen Depot, October 2005.

Ryen Depot (Norwegian: Ryen vognhall) is the main depot for the Oslo Metro, and is located at Ryen in Oslo, Norway. The depot contains 19,000 square meters (200,000 sq ft) of buildings and has space for 120 trains, and consists of a workshop, inspection hall and a storage hall. It opened in 1966.

== Facilities ==
The depot is located along the Lambertseter Line, between the line and European Route E6. The depot occupies an area which 600 by 150 meters (1,970 by 490 ft), covering an area of 6.2 hectares (15 acres). The main building is 260 by 45 meters (853 by 148 ft) and 10,000 square meters (110,000 sq ft). It has ten tracks, with room for 120 cars. North of the main hall is the workshop, which is 159 by 75 meters (522 by 246 ft), and covers an area of 9,000 square meters (97,000 sq ft), of which 3,800 square meters (41,000 sq ft) is the inspection hall. The inspection hall is used for smaller repairs and preemptive work, while the main workshop is used for larger repairs, such as mechanical and electric work on the bodies, bogies and motors.

== History ==
The original plans for the metro called for four smaller depots and a central workshop for both the trams and the metro at Etterstad, near Helsfyr Station. Following the 1960 decision to close the Oslo Tramway, it was decided that a common depot for the metro would be best, and an area at Ryen was purchased. The depot was taken into use at the same time as the Lambertseter was converted to and became the first line of the metro. From 1971, the area at Etterstad was taken into use as an operations central for both the city tramway, the Lilleaker Line, the Ekeberg Line and the metro. During the 1980s, some of the trains were stored at the end tunnels of the Furuset Line and the Grorud Line.
