= Høyenhall (station) =

Oslo metro station

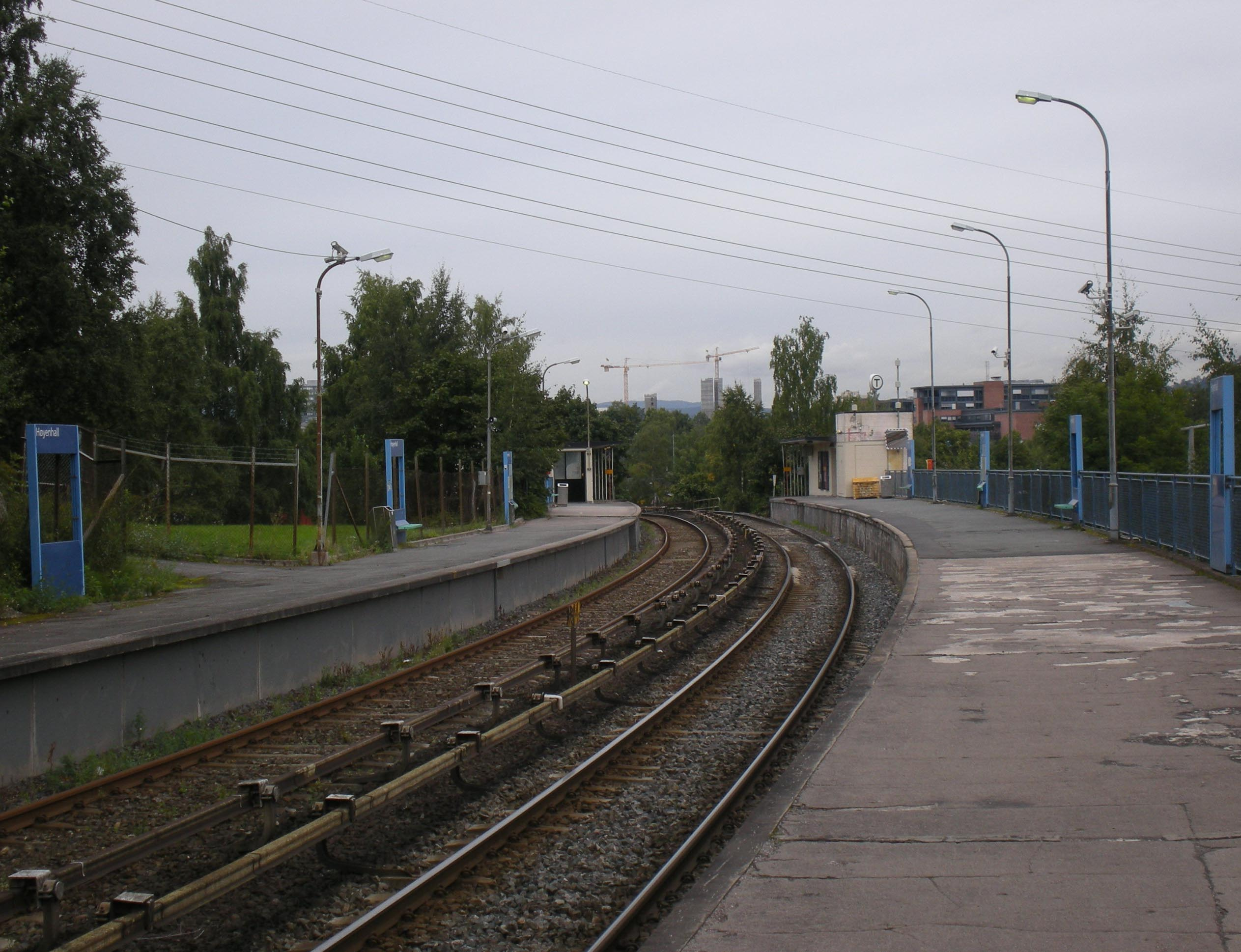

General information
- Location: Høyenhall, Oslo; Norway
- Coordinates: 59°54′19″N 10°49′9″E
- Owner: Sporveien
- Operator: Sporveien T-banen
- Line: Lambertseter Line
- Distance: 5.2 km (3.2 mi) from Stortinget

Construction
- Structure type: At-grade
- Accessible: Yes

History
- Opened: 28 April 1957
Location

Høyenhall is a rapid transit station on the Lambertseter Line of the Oslo Metro. Served by Line 4, it is the first station on the Lambertseter Line not shared with any other line. It is located between Brynseng and Manglerud, 5.2 kilometres (3.2 mi) away from Stortinget.

The station was opened as a tram station in 1957, and as a metro station on 22 May 1966. The architects were Thorvald and Henning Astrup.

Preceding station	Oslo Metro	Following station
Brynseng towards Frognerseteren	Line 1	Manglerud towards Bergkrystallen
Brynseng towards Vestli	Line 4	Manglerud towards Bergkrystallen
