= Lambertseter Line =

Metro line from Brynseng to Bergkrystallen, Norway

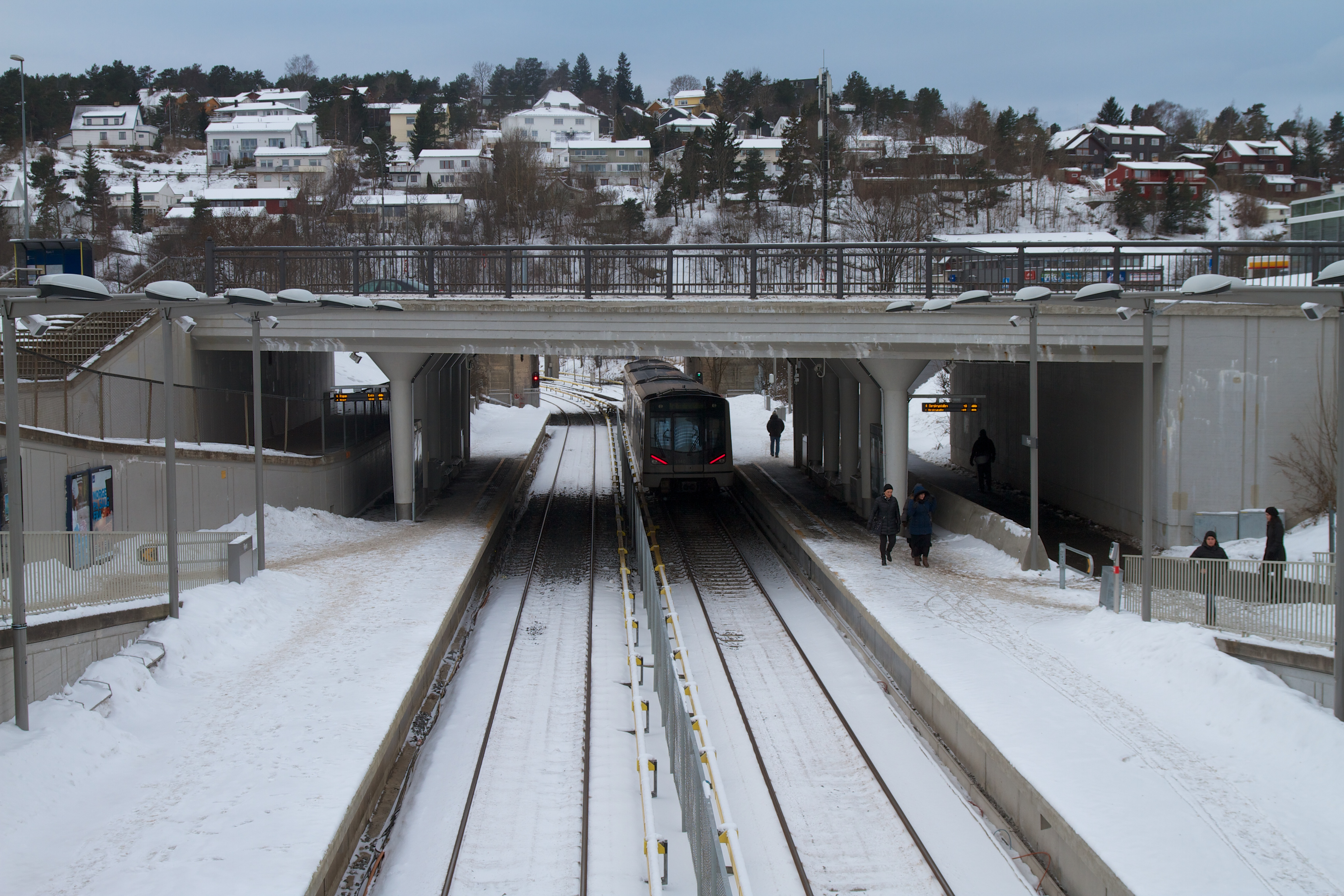
- MX3000 at Ryen Station

Overview
- Native name: Lambertseterbanen
- Owner: Sporveien
- Termini: Tøyen; Bergkrystallen
- Stations: 11

Service
- Type: Rapid transit
- System: Oslo Metro
- Operator(s): Sporveien T-banen
- Depot(s): Ryen
- Rolling stock: MX3000

History
- Opened: 28 April 1957

Technical
- Line length: 8.4 km (5.2 mi)
- Number of tracks: Double
- Track gauge: 1,435 mm (4 ft 8 1/2 in) standard gauge
- Electrification: 750 V DC third rail
- Operating speed: 70 km/h (43 mph)
- Highest elevation: 165.5 m (543 ft)

The Lambertseter Line (Norwegian: Lambertseterbanen) is a 5.9-kilometer (3.7 mi) line on the Oslo Metro which runs from Brynseng to Bergkrystallen. It further shares track with the Østensjø Line along the 2.5-kilometer (1.6 mi) section from Tøyen to Brynseng. The line runs through a primary residential area of Nordstrand, serving neighborhoods such as Manglerud, Ryen and Lambertseter. The line is served by Line 4 of the metro, which runs every fifteen minutes. This is supplemented by Line 1 that is extended to Bergkrystallen between 6:30 and 19 on weekdays, giving a combined frequency of eight trains per hour.

Originally the Lambertseter Line was proposed as an extension of the now closed Simensbråten Line. Planning of a metro started in 1946 and instead of running via Ekeberg the Lambertseter Line was to run via Etterstad. Construction was tied with large-scale construction of housing along the route. As the Lambertseter Line could be completed much earlier than the metro's Common Tunnel, the Lambertseter Line was first built as part of the Oslo Tramway. Plans were approved in 1954 and the line opened on 28 April 1957. Until 17 May 1966 it was operated by Oslo Sporveier's SM53 trams and connected to the city center via the Vålerenga Line. From 22 May it became the first part of the Oslo Metro. The metro's main depot, Ryen Depot, is situated along the line. The Lambertseter Line received a major overhaul between 2010 and 2013.

== Route ==
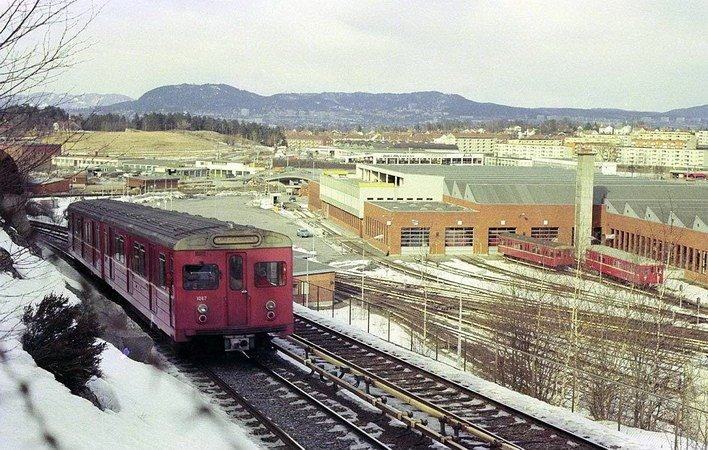
A now retired T1000 train climbing up Ekebergåsen in 1975, with Ryen Depot in the background

The Lambertseter Line runs from Tøyen on the Common Tunnel to Bergkrystallen, a distance of 8.4 kilometers (5.2 mi). The segment from Tøyen to Brynseng can arguably be regarded as part of the Common Line or as part of the Lambertseter Line. From Tøyen, where the Grorud Line branches off from the Common Tunnel, the line makes a 180-degree loop under the Tøyen Park. At this point there is also a direct, single-track tunnel which allows non-revenue trains access from the Grorud Line. The line passes under the Gjøvik Line and leaves the tunnel just before Ensjø Station, which is located on a short section of ground-level track. After Ensjø the line enters a new tunnel at Malerhaugen, which includes the underground Helsfyr Station. Immediately afterwards it ascends to ground level and continues to Brynseng Station. In this intermediate section the line passes a maintenance of way depot and splits, with the Lambertseter Line receiving separate tracks at Brynseng. Both Helsfyr and Brynseng are the site of several large offices complexes.

At Brynseng lines continue concurrently across a bridge over the Trunk Line and then the Østensjø Line and trains heading towards the Furuset Line branch off towards Hellerud Station. The Lambertseter Line continues to Høyenhall Station. The line continues along Ring 3 and passes Manglerud Station and Ryen Station. After the station there is a turn-off to Ryen Depot, while the main line itself continues to climb Ekebergåsen, reaching Brattlikollen Station. The line continues past the stations of Karlsrud, Lambertseter and Munkelia. After the latter the line turns ninety degrees, passes through a 245-meter (804 ft) tunnel before reaching the terminus, Bergkrystallen.

== Service ==
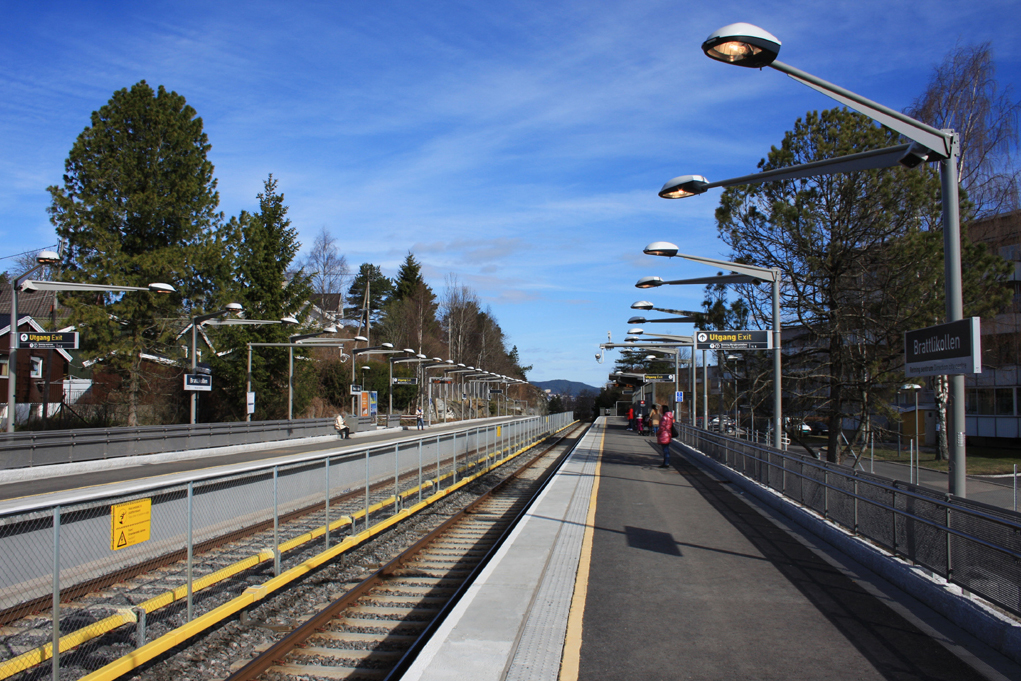
Brattlikollen Station in 2014, after its renovation

The Lambertseter Line proper is served by Line 4 of the Oslo Metro. Most of the week it runs four services per hour, although there are reduced services during late evenings and parts of the weekend. Line 4 runs through the Common Tunnel and continues along the Ring Line, Løren Line and Grorud Line towards Vestli. Supplemental service is provided by Line 1 which connects to the Holmenkollen Line towards Frognerseteren (station) in the west. Operations of the lines are done by Sporveien T-banen on contract with Ruter, the public transport authority in Oslo and Akershus. The infrastructure itself is owned by Sporveien, a municipal company. Service is provided using MX3000 three- and six-car trains. Travel time from Bergkrystallen to Brynseng is 12 minutes and from Bergkrystallen to Stortinget is 22 minutes. The line had 8,000 weekday average boarding passengers in 2002, making it the least trafficked of the eastern metro lines.

== History ==
=== Planning ===
The first plans to build a tramway along part of the route of the Lambertseter Line were launched by Ekebergbanen. They had opened the Ekeberg Line in 1917, which was supplemented with a branch, the 1.3-kilometer (0.81 mi) Simensbråten Line, in 1931. Ekebergbanen proposed extending the branch along the route of the Lamberseter Line between Ryen and Brattlikollen. The terminus was planned at about Munkelia. The Ekeberg and Simensbråten lines were both light rails in their own exclusive right of way. However, the final section into the city center used street lines in mixed traffic along the Gamlebyen Line. Since 1919, there had been plans to connect the Ekeberg Line with the Holmenkollen Line on the west side of town via a tunnel. Along part of the stretch, this connection was planned elevated. Due to the German occupation of Norway from 1940 to 1945, all plans and construction of tramways were halted.

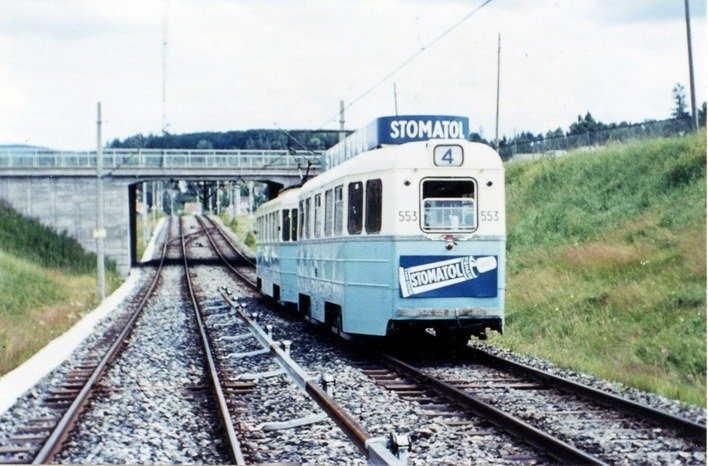
SM53 tram on the Lambertseter Line between Manglerud and Høyenhall in 1963

Planning of the metro commenced in 1946. A committee was appointed, who quickly that a tramway would be insufficient to handle the necessary traffic. An overground system was ruled out because of the increased estimates in traffic and an underground route was instead pursued. This part of the line would need to handle a traffic of 20,000 passengers per hour. Following the 1948 merger of the municipalities of Oslo and Aker, it was decided that the Nordstrand area in the former Aker would be opened to large-scale residential construction. Preliminary work on the line planning concluded in 1949 and instead a permanent municipal agency was established, the Planning Office For the Suburban and Underground Lines, on 15 September 1949. Instrumental in the change of magnitude was the change of was a shift in the zoning planning. There was a large housing shortage in Oslo and the region was experiencing rapid population growth. The solution was to build a series of commuter towns in Aker, which would be the basis for the traffic on the metro. Plans for both a metro and new housing were substantiated in a 1950 municipal plan.

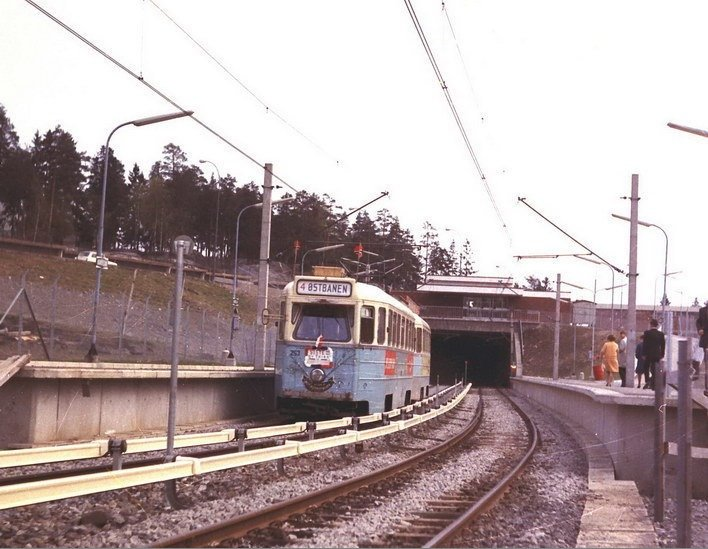
SM53 tram at Munkelia Station on 17 May 1966, the last day with tram services

The basics for the metro were established in 1951, with a common segment through Enerhaugen with a terminus at Grønlands torg, to avoid having to cross Akerselva. The plans were made such that in the future the line could be extended to connect to Holmenkolbanen's western underground line at Nationaltheatret. Four branches would be built, including the Grorud Line; the existing Østensjø Line would be converted to metro. The Lambertseter Line was politically approved on 3 April 1952 and the full four-line network was approved on 9 December 1954. The latter included moving the terminus to Jernbanetorget. Investments were estimated at 221 million Norwegian krone, including rolling stock. The Lambertseter Line was given a new route west of Ryen, and would connect to the Østensjø Line at Bryn. These plans were passed by the city council on 9 December 1954, and also included the construction of the Grorud Line and an extension of the Østensjø Line from Oppsal to Bøler. In February 1956, it was also decided that the Lambertseter Line would be expanded to Bergkrystallen.

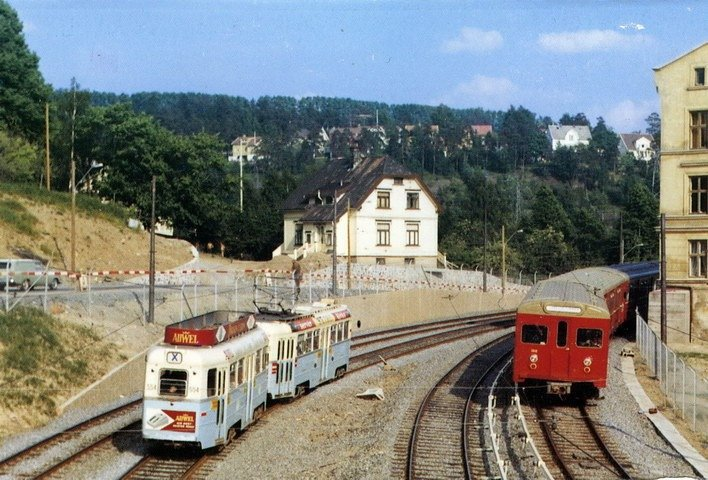
SM53 tram on the Østensjø Line and T1000 train on the Lambertseter Line between Helsfyr and Brynseng in 1966. For a little over a year the Lambertseter Line was a metro line, while the Østensjø Line was still a tramway.

=== Construction ===
Because of the long construction time for the Common Tunnel, the plans involved that the Lambertseter Line would first be built as a tramway and later connected to the metro. Similarly, the Østensjø Line would also be converted to metro. To ease the conversion, the Lambertseter Line was built for 3.2-meter (10 ft 6 in) wide trains, lean curves and no level crossings. At the time it was presumed that the metro would be built with overhead wires, the same as the Oslo Tramway. Between Munkelia and Bergkrystallen, the 245-meter (804 ft) Rabben Tunnel was built, and a branch line to the brick factory at Høyenhall. The station at Høyenhall was built with the high platforms that would be used on the metro; therefore the tram platforms were built as a low-entry expansion of metro platform. Ryan and Brattlikollen received turning loops with radius 18 meters (59 ft 1 in). Construction cost 20.1 million Norwegian krone.

From Helsfyr the line continued to the city center via the Vålerenga Line and the Gamlebyen Line. The Lambertseter Line was the first suburban line operated by Oslo Sporveier, and therefore the company copied the security procedures of Bærumsbanen, that operated the Kolsås Line and the Østensjø Line. The first operation on the Lambertseter Line with the SM53 trams was on 10 April 1957, after technical trials had been conducted with the Gullfisk trams. Travel time from Jernbanetorget to Bergkrystallen was 28 minutes. The official opening took place on 28 April. The lines were trafficked with SM53-trams that had been in service up to five years with the company, and were bought specifically in mind to be able to operate the suburban line, in addition to street lines. In addition, school trams were operated with Gullfisk. At first, the Lambertseter Line was made part of Line 4, that connected onwards along the Kolsås Line. This was later changed so it only operated to Vognmannsgata from 19 June 1960. From 24 June 1963, the trams terminated at Jernbanetorget. Starting in September 1960, the loop at Ryan was taken out of service, and a depot for the metro was started built at the site.

=== Metro operations ===
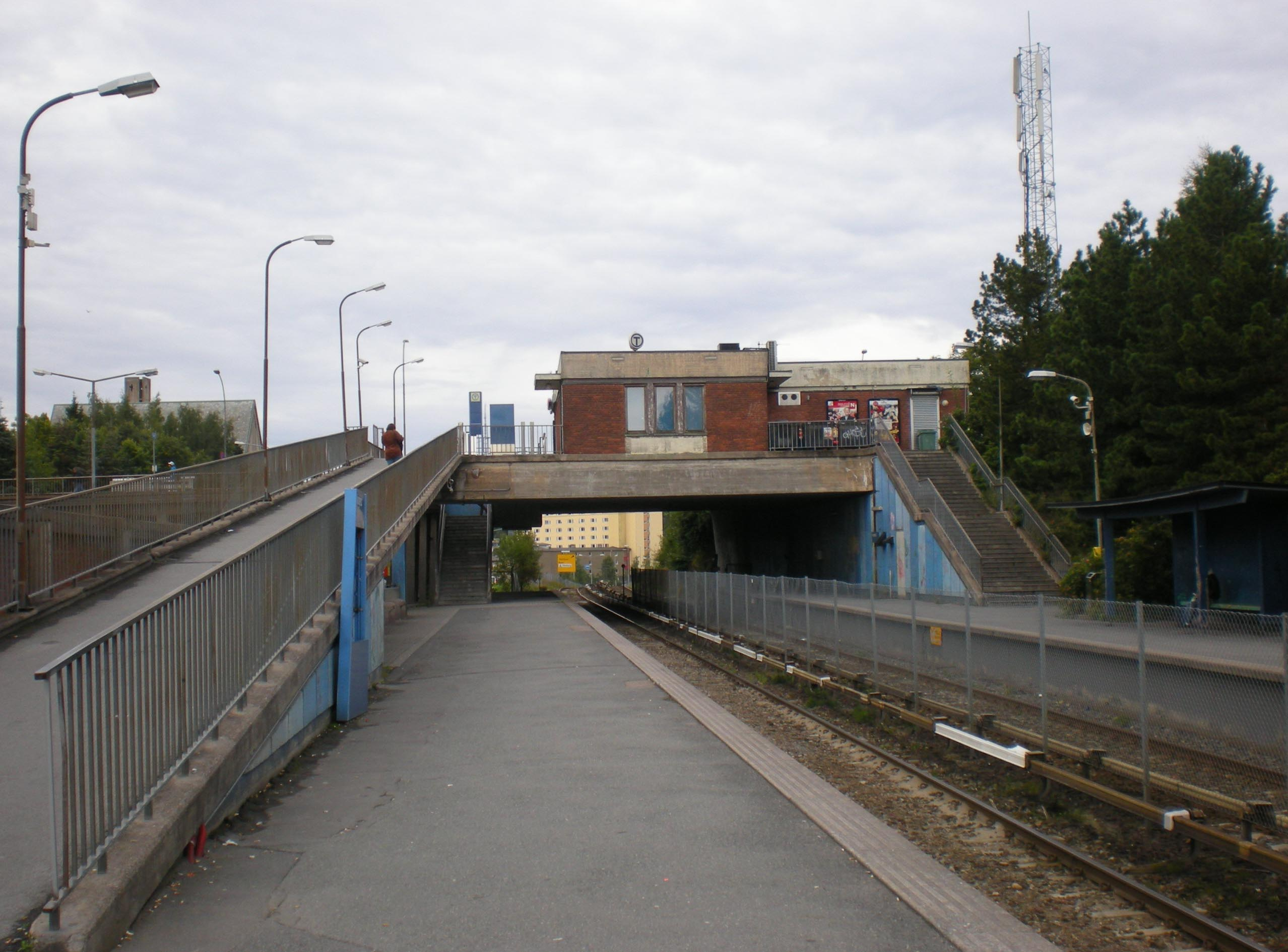
Manglerud Station before the upgrade

Conversion to metro started in September 1962. Building the new stations commenced in October 1963 and were completed by the end of 1965. The upgrades cost 11 million kroner, excluding third rail. Originally the Groroud Line was to be the first line of the metro to open. However, lack of rolling stock and other technical problems caused Oslo Sporveier to alter the plans on 16 March 1966, and instead opted to open the Lambertseter Line first.

The last trams operated during the night between 17 and 18 May 1966, in preparation for the conversion to metro. The line was disconnected with the tramway at Høyenhall and instead to the new metro line that leads to the Common Tunnel. At Bergkrystallen the loop was removed and the tracks rebuilt. All the platforms had in due time been rebuilt to the platform height used by the metro. The Lambertseter Line opened as the first part of the Oslo Metro on 22 May 1966, along with the Common Tunnel. In October the Grorud Line was connected, and in 1967 the Østensjø Line. With the upgrade, T1000 rolling stock was taken into use, along with automatic train control, step-free access with high platforms and a third-rail power supply.

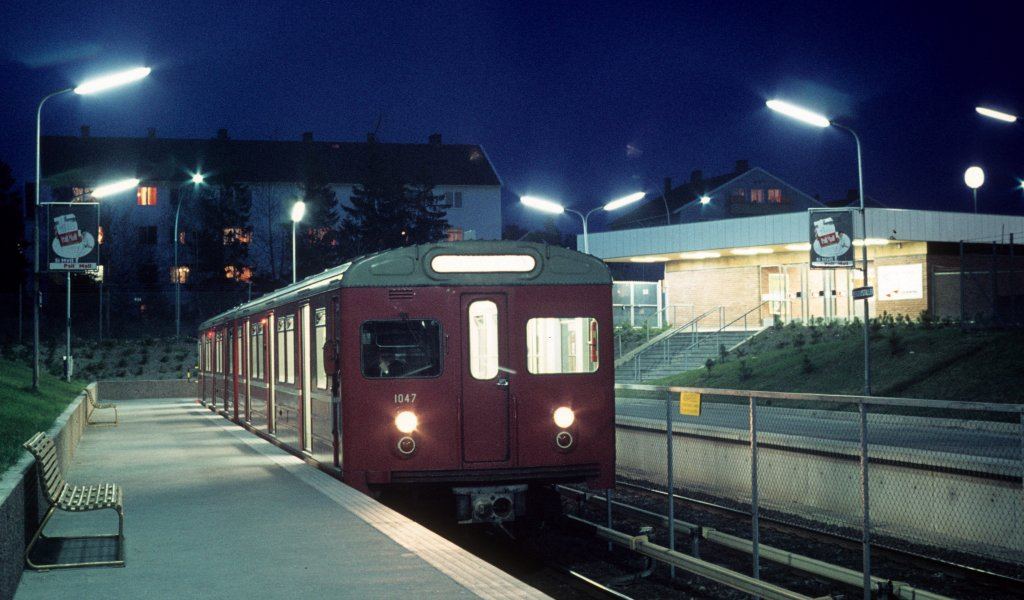
T1000 train at Bergkrystallen in 1971

On 9 January 1977, the city center service was extended to Sentrum. However, this station was closed from 20 March 1983 to 7 March 1987, and reopened as Stortinget. At first the line had a headway of 15 minutes. From 21 August 1978 this was halved to 7.5 minutes during rush hour, some from Bergkrystallen and some from Karlsrud. During the last years of the 1980s the barres and payment stalls were removed and replaced with a proof-of-payment system. This unstaffing of the station allowed for a significant cut in operating costs. On 4 April 1993 the Sognsvann Line was converted to a metro line and it was linked with the Lambertseter Line and Line 4. With the delivery of T2000 trains, the Holmenkollen Line and Line 1 was also routed to the Lambertseter Line, although outside of rush hour Line 1 did not run past Helsfyr.

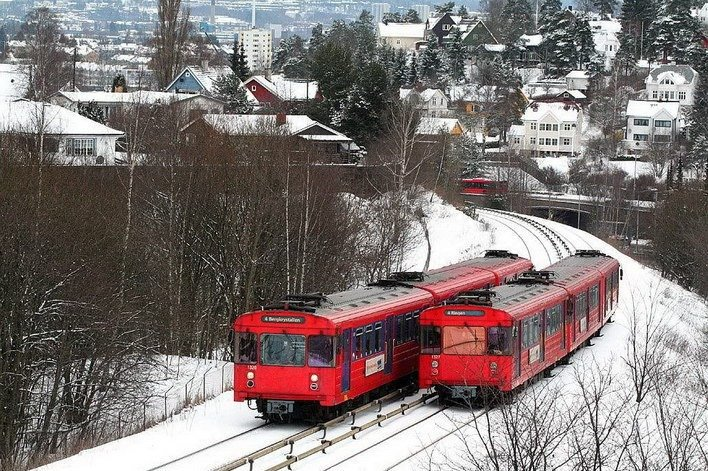
Two now retired T1300 trains meeting near Brynsenteret in 2006

This was changed from 12 April 2003, when Line 4 was linked with the Kolsås Line, and Line 1 no longer ran along the Lambertseter Line. Services on Line 1 resumed on 8 August 2005. From 20 August 2006 this was changed and Line 4 connected instead with the Ring Line. From March to 6 December 2010 the Holmenkollen Line was closed for upgrades and Line 1 was terminated. Oslo T-banedrift was in the process of taking delivery of new MX3000 trains, but they did not yet have sufficient matériel to use six-car trains on the Lambertseter Line. The abrupt reduction in service caused there to be standing-room only from Munkelia. Further deliveries of MX3000 allowed several of the trains to be extended to six cars. An express bus line, Line 4E, was also established to relieve pressure on the metro. When Line 1 resumed, it was instead linked with the Furuset Line until being reconnected to the Lambertseter line on 3 April 2016.

The Lambertseter Line between Brynseng and Ryen received a major upgrade in 2010. The oldest tracks on the line were from 1943 and were in poor condition. Their poor quality had among other issues caused the speed between Høyenhall and Manglerud to be reduced to 30 kilometers per hour (19 mph). Three stations, Høyenhall, Manglerud and Ryen, received upgrades, including new sheds, new lighting and better accessibility. The work involved the line being closed for almost two months. A second round of upgrades were carried out from 8 April to 9 September 2013, this time on the section from Ryen to Bergkrystallen. All stations except Bergkrystallen were upgrades, receiving new sheds, lighting, platform decks and improved accessibility. The ballast had become clogged up, hindering proper drainage. Tracks and ballast were replaced, allowing the temporary speed limit of 40 kilometers per hour (25 mph) to be abolished. In addition, two bridges and two culverts were renovated. The project cost 160 million Norwegian krone.

== Bibliography ==
- Aspenberg, Nils Carl (1994). Trikker og forstadsbaner i Oslo (in Norwegian). Oslo: Baneforlaget. ISBN 82-91448-03-5.
- Bjerke, Thor; Holom, Finn (2004). Banedata 2004 (in Norwegian). Hamar / Oslo: Norsk Jernbanemuseum / Norsk Jernbaneklubb. ISBN 82-90286-28-7.
- Haldsrud, Stian (2013). Banen og byen (in Norwegian). Oslo: Storbyforlaget. ISBN 978-82-999426-0-7.
