= Ring 2 (Oslo) =

Road in Oslo, Norway

Coordinates: 59°56′06″N 10°43′45″E

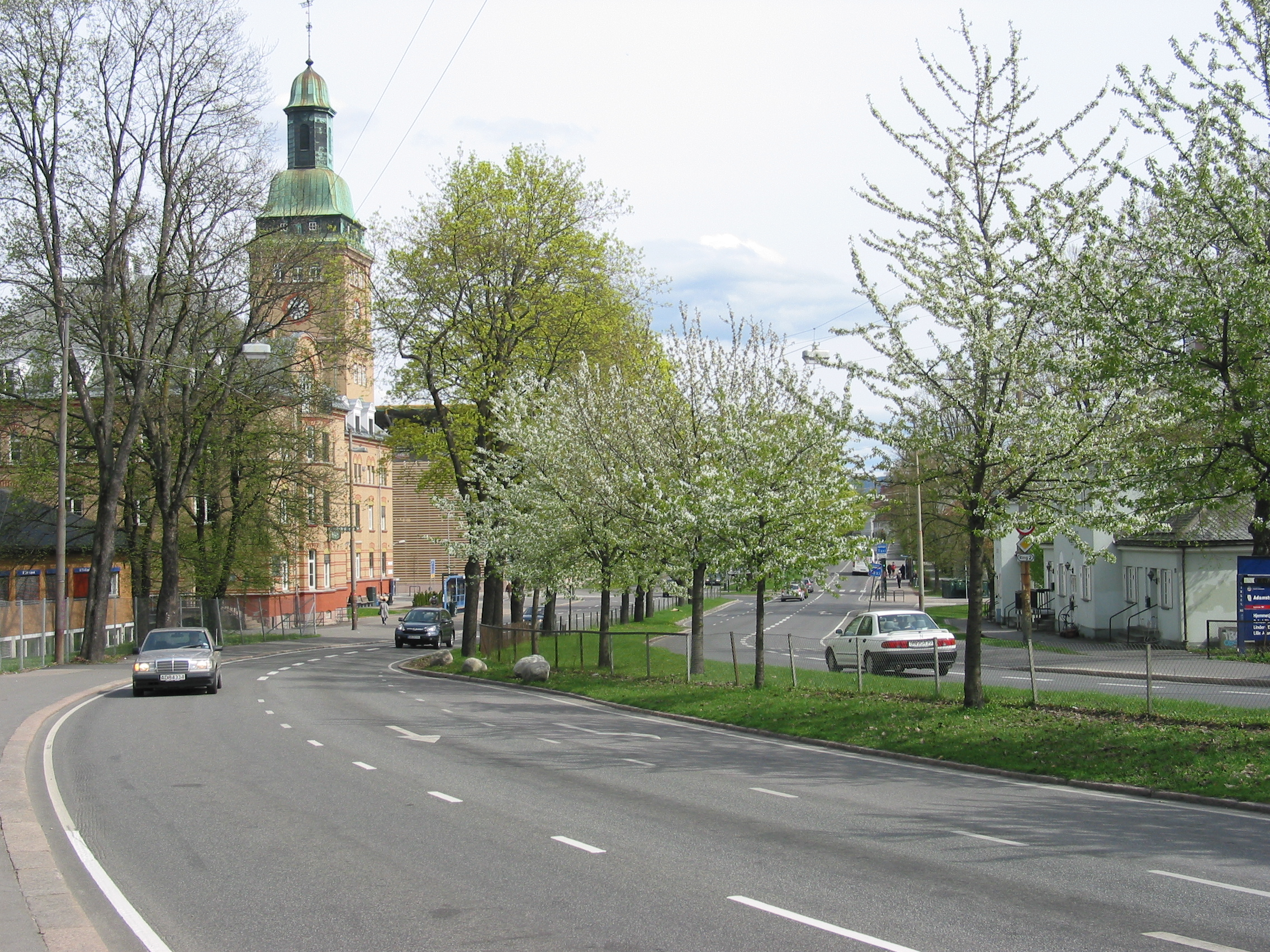
Portion of Norwegian National Road 161 (Kirkeveien) near Ullevål University Hospital.

Ring 2, sometimes called Kirkeveiringen and until 2010 officially known as National Road 161 (Norwegian: Riksvei 161), is the oldest ring road and surface street through densely populated parts of Oslo, Norway.

== Geography ==
It stretches from Skøyen to Lodalen, a length of 9.7 km. The most important locations along the route are Skøyen, Frogner, Majorstuen, Lindern, Sagene, Carl Berners plass, Tøyen and Galgeberg. Important institutions like the Frogner Park, the Norwegian Broadcasting Corporation, Ullevål University Hospital and the University of Oslo are situated along or near the road. The name of streets are Drammensveien—Halvdan Svartes gate—Kirkeveien—Griffenfeldts gate—Marcus Thranes gate—Christian Michelsens gate—Finnmarkgaten—Kjølberggaten—Åkebergveien—St. Halvards gate—Kværnerveien.

== Traffic ==
Ring 2 is used by both cars and public transportation. The traffic on the route is separated only with traffic lights and roundabouts. The road is connected to major highways such as European route E18, National Road 4 and National Road 190. Major parts of Ring 2 are heavily congested during peak hours, because of low capacity and many large intersections. The route was originally planned to have 4 lanes, but several parts have only 2 lanes. The entire route is a priority road and the speed limit is 50 km/h.

There are some parking garages situated on the western parts of the route. The gas stations along the road are situated on Skøyen, Marienlyst, Fagerborg, Lindern, Carl Berners Plass and Tøyen.

== See also ==
- Ring 3 (Oslo)
