= Ring 3 (Oslo) =

Road in Norway

Coordinates: 59°56′45″N 10°42′59″E

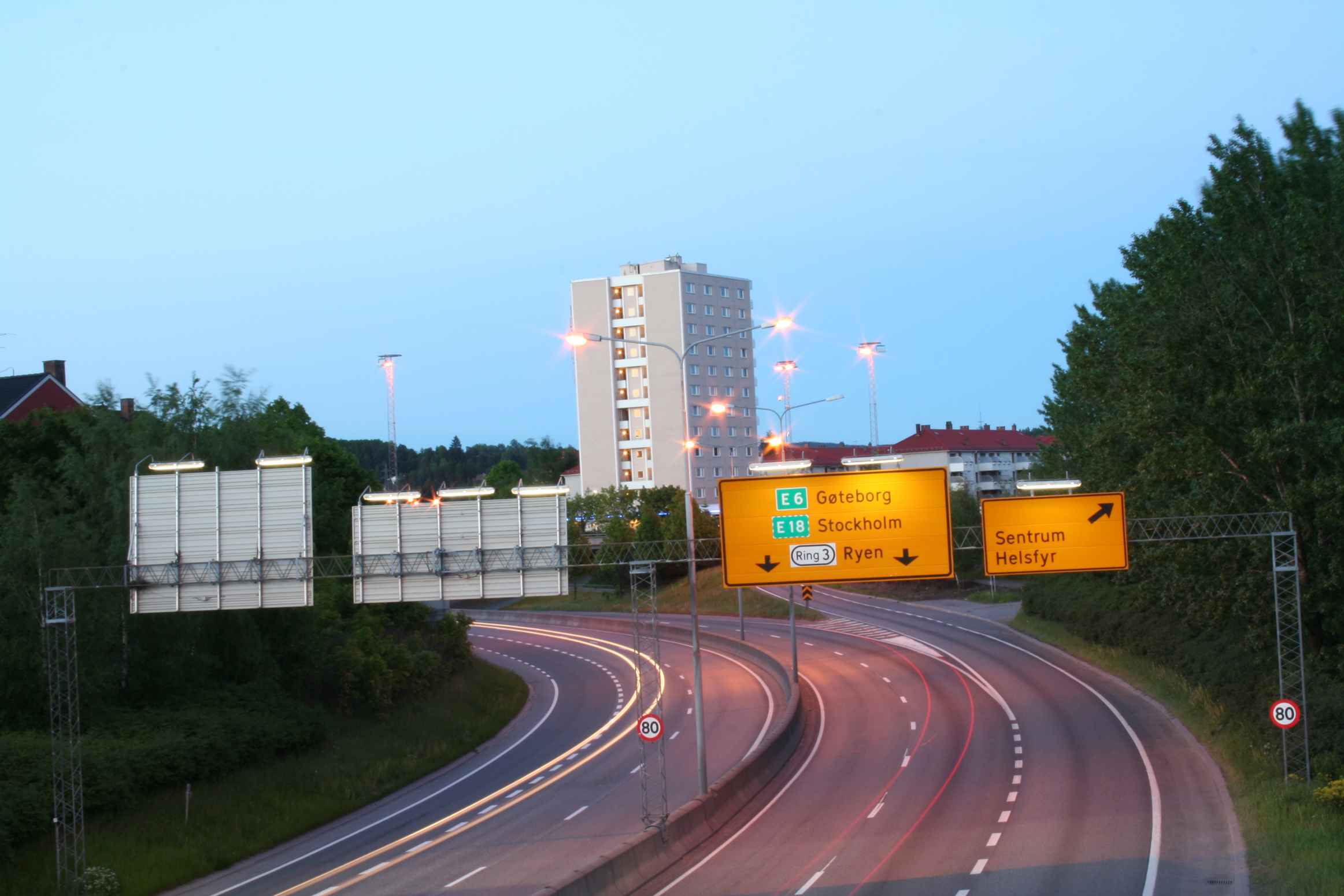
Ring 3 at Teisen

Norwegian National Road 150, also known as Ring 3 and formerly Store Ringvei, is a beltway limited-access road which circumnavigates Oslo, Norway. It runs from Ryen, through the Sinsen Interchange to Lysaker in Bærum.

== History ==
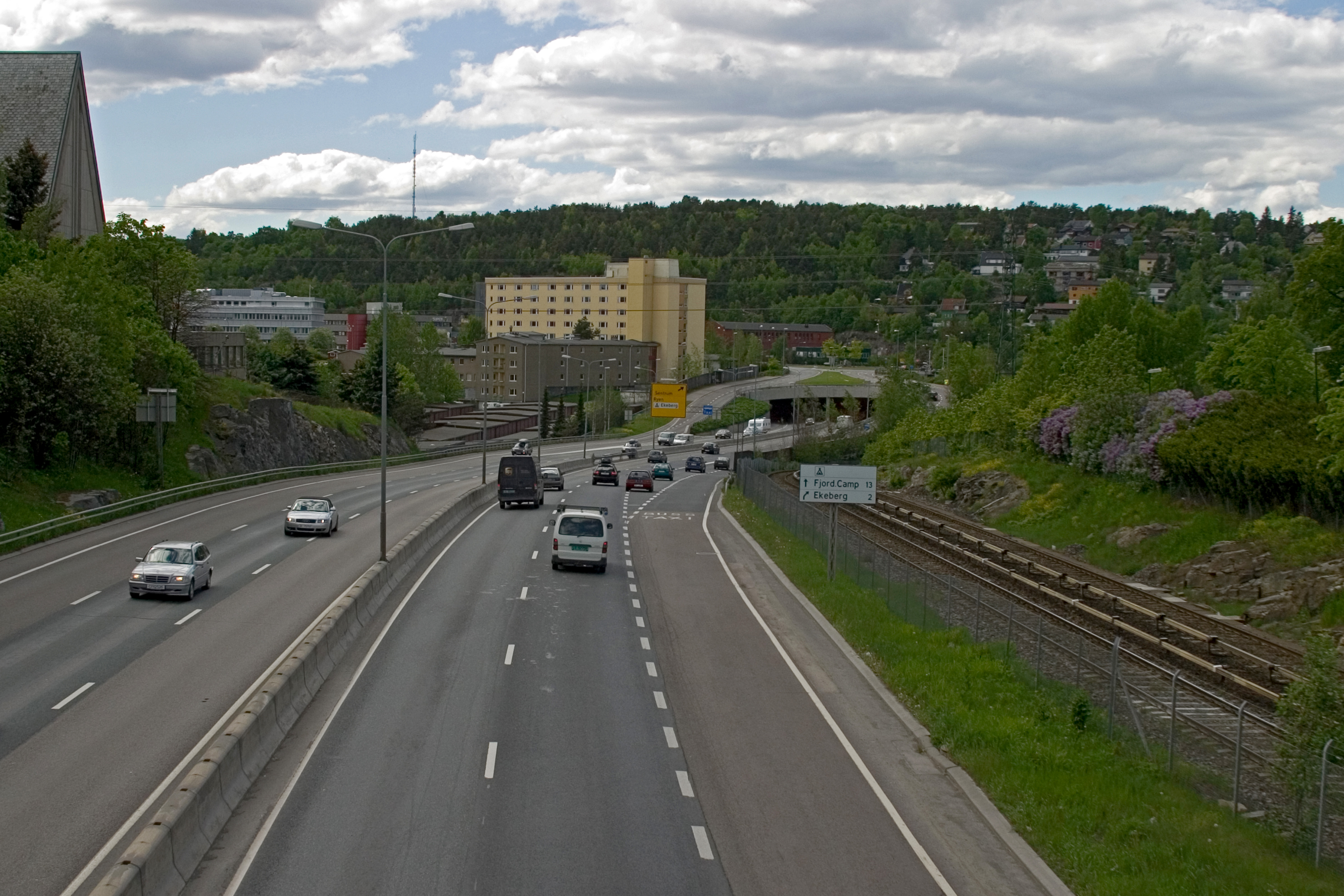
Adolf Hedins vei is part of Ring 3, here with Manglerud to the left and Ryen up ahead. To the right the Lambertseter Line of the Oslo Metro

The Sinsen Interchange, where Ring 3 meets Trondheimsveien was opened in 1962. The increase in traffic was greater than the capacity of the junction, and thus a bridge was constructed that redirected Trondheimsveien above the roundabout.

Further restructuring was done in 1992, when the Sinsen Line of the Oslo Tramway was redirected outside of the interchange, and in 1994, when National Road 150 was directed below the roundabout. The Norwegian Public Roads Administration plans to connect the Løren Tunnel, a tunnel over National Road 150, with the Sinsen Interchange in summer 2013.

The highway is subdivided into parts with separate names (from Ryen to Lysaker):

- Adolf Hedins vei
- Hjalmar Brantings vei
- Dag Hammarskjølds vei
- Storoveien
- Rolf Wickstrøms vei
- Tåsentunnelen
- Kaj Munks vei
- Torgny Segerstedts vei
- Viggo Hansteens vei
- Ullernchausséen
- Granfoss Tunnel (Snarøyveien)

== See also ==
- Ring 2 (Oslo)
