= OS MX3000 =

Electric multiple unit used on the Oslo Metro

MX3000
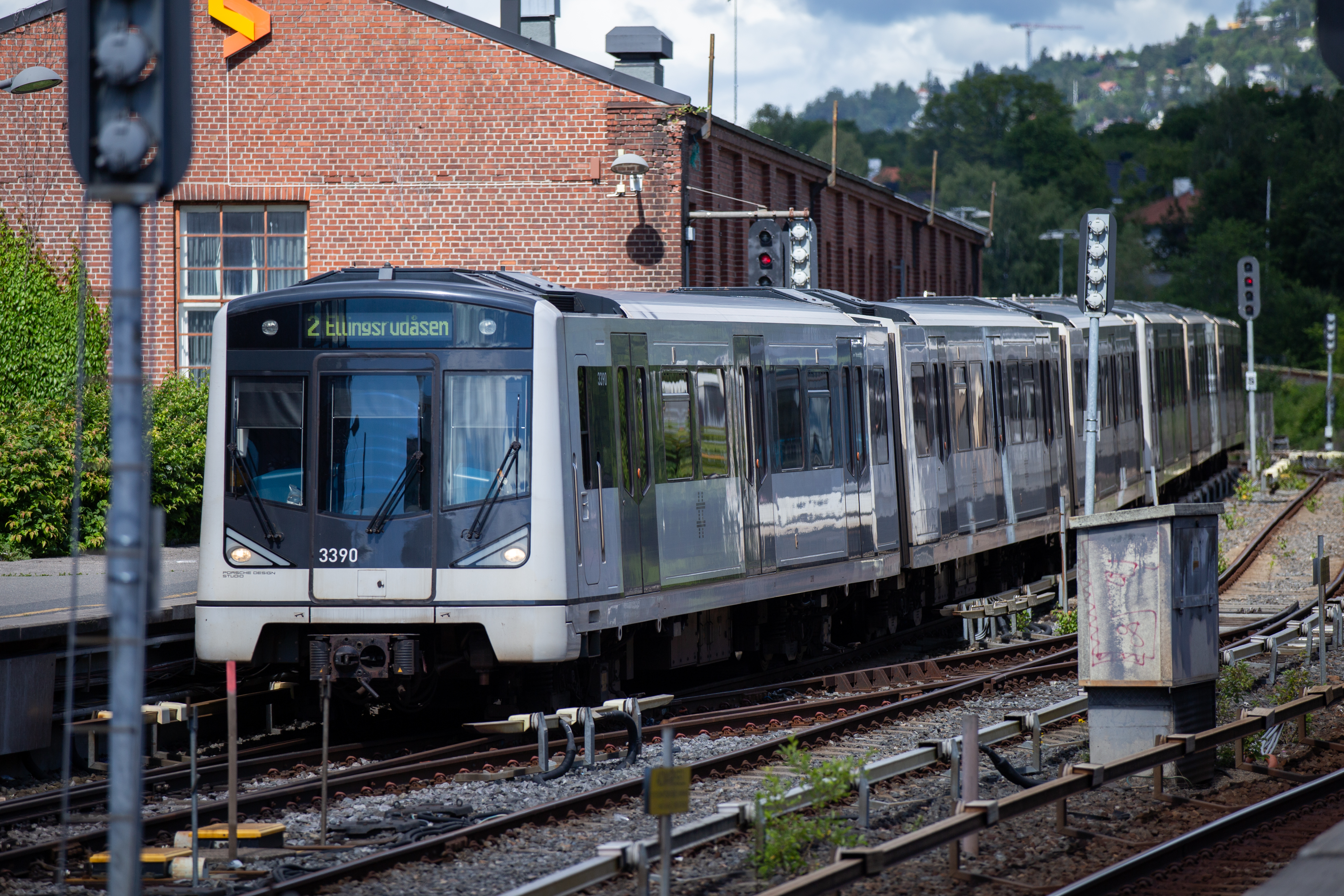

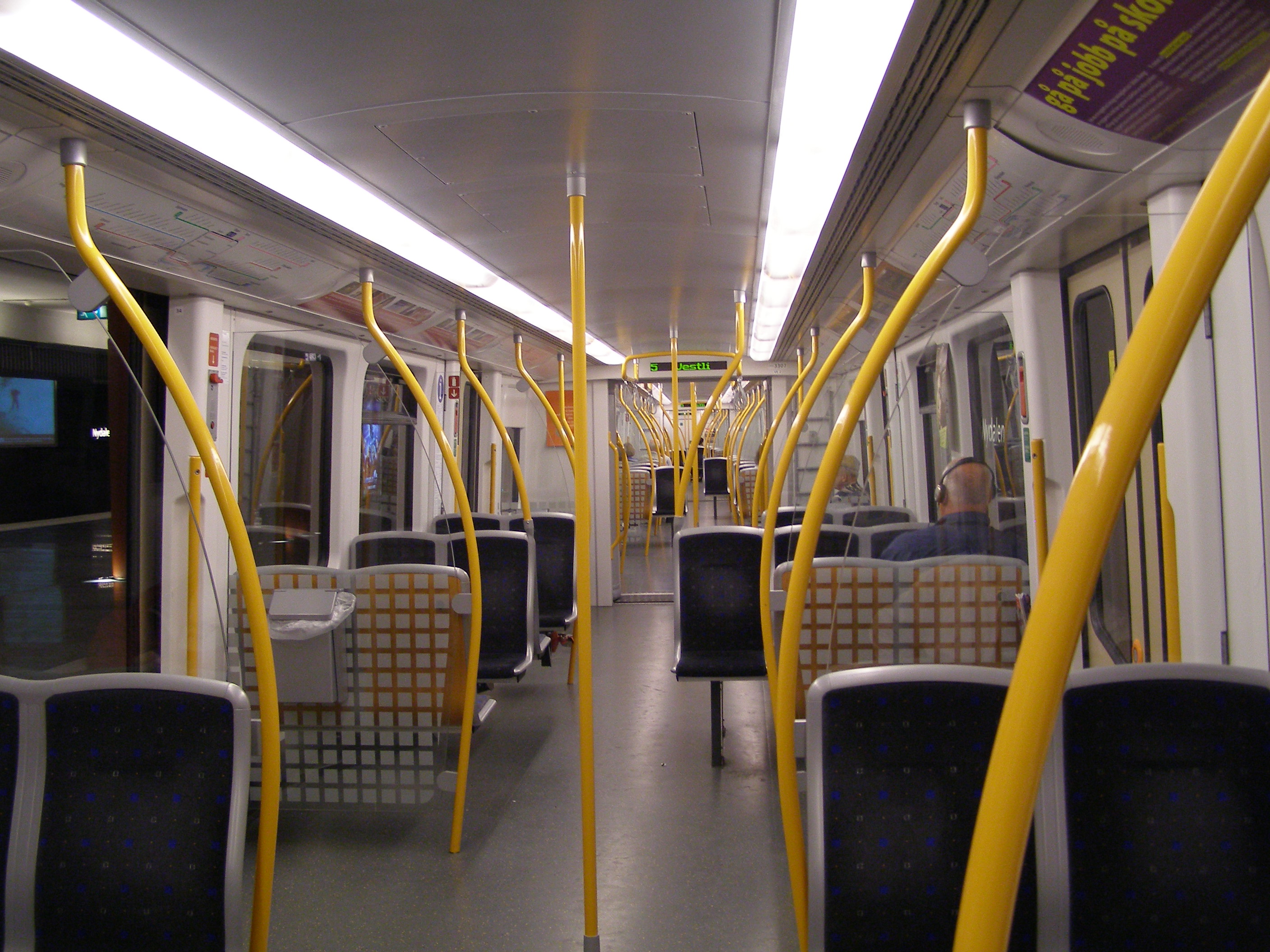
- In service: 2007–present
- Manufacturer: Siemens
- Designer: Porsche Design Studio
- Built at: Vienna, Austria
- Family name: Modular Metro
- Replaced: T1000/T1300, T2000
- Constructed: 2005–2012
- Number built: 345 carriages (115 units)
- Number in service: 345 carriages (115 units)
- Formation: 3 cars (Mc1–M–Mc2) per unit, 1-2 units per train
- Fleet numbers: 3x01–3x115
- Capacity: 493 passengers (3-car set)
- Operator: Sporveien T-banen
- Depots: Avløs, Majorstuen, Ryen
- Line served: All Oslo Metro lines

Specifications
- Car body construction: Aluminium
- Train length: 54.34 m (178 ft 3 in)
- Car length: 18.21 m (59 ft 9 in) (Mc); 17.92 m (58 ft 10 in) (M)
- Width: 3.16 m (10 ft 4 in)
- Height: 3.8 m (12 ft 6 in)
- Floor height: 1.12 m (3 ft 8 in)
- Wheel diameter: 850–770 mm (33–30 in) (new–worn)
- Wheelbase: 2,100 mm (6 ft 11 in)
- Maximum speed: 80 km/h (50 mph) (design); 70 km/h (43 mph) (service)
- Weight: 94 t (93 long tons; 104 short tons) (empty); 141.5 t (139.3 long tons; 156.0 short tons) (with payload)
- Axle load: 12.5 t (12.3 long tons; 13.8 short tons)
- Steep gradient: 6.2%
- Traction system: Siemens SIBAC IGBT–VVVF
- Traction motors: 12 × Siemens 140 kW (190 hp) 3-phase AC induction motor
- Power output: 1.68 MW (2,250 hp)
- Acceleration: 1.27 m/s^{2} (4.2 ft/s^{2})
- Deceleration: 1.35 m/s^{2} (4.4 ft/s^{2}) (service)
- Electric systems: 750 V DC third rail
- Current collection: Contact shoe
- UIC classification: Bo′Bo′+Bo′Bo′+Bo′Bo′
- Bogies: Siemens SF 1000
- Minimum turning radius: 100 m (330 ft)
- Safety systems: Siemens Trainguard MT moving block CBTC with subsystems of ATC, ATO GoA 2 (STO), ATP, ATS and CBI
- Coupling system: Scharfenberg
- Track gauge: 1,435 mm (4 ft 8 1/2 in) standard gauge

MX3000 is an electric train used on Oslo Metro in Oslo, Norway. The multiple units are produced by Siemens Mobility, who started serial delivery in 2007. Seventy-eight three-car units were ordered by Sporveien, and five by Akershus County Municipality. They replaced the older T1000 and T1300 stock that was used on the Oslo Metro since 1966. By 2010, the last T1000 and T1300 trains had been retired and replaced by 83 three-car units. 32 additional sets were ordered, and the final train set was delivered in 2014, increasing the fleet to 115 units.

The trains are built as 3-car units, though they often operate 2 coupled units in regular service (except for line 1). The units are 54.34 metres (178 ft 3 in) long, and weigh 98 tonnes (96 long tons; 108 short tons) empty. They have twelve 140-kilowatt (190 hp) traction motors, allowing speeds of 70 kilometres per hour (43 mph). Seated capacity is 138 seats, and total capacity is 493 passengers. The first series of 33 units were ordered in 2003, followed by an additional order for 30 in 2005, 15 in 2008, and 32 in December 2010. Financed by Oslo Package 2, each unit cost about 45 million kr.

== History ==
In 1966, the Oslo Metro opened as an upgrade of two existing suburban tramways, the Østensjø- and Lambertseter Lines (Lines 3 and 4). By 1970, the system was supplemented by the Grorud- and Furuset Lines. They only operated to the eastern suburbs. In 1987, the system was expanded to connect to the western network, that remained a suburban tramway with overhead wires, two-car platforms and an inferior signaling system. In 1993, the Sognsvann Line was converted to metro standard, with the Røa Line following two years later. When the order for the MX3000 trains was placed, the Kolsås- and Holmenkoll Lines still used overhead wires, and would not be able to use the new stock. Both systems were at the time being considered for conversion to light rail systems, that would connect to the Lilleaker- and Ullevål Hageby Line, respectively.

The old fleet of T1000 and T1300 consisted of 195 cars in eight series. The T1000 was the original series delivered between 1966 and 1978, while the T1300 was a later adoption built until 1987. The T1000 series had only a third rail shoe, while the T1300 also had a pantograph, and could be used on the Kolsås- and Holmenkoll Lines. In 1995, six two-car T2000 units were delivered for the Holmenkoll Line. They were, at the time, proposed as a possible replacement for all the T1000 and T1300 stock, but were prone to technical problems. They featured both third rail shoes and pantographs.

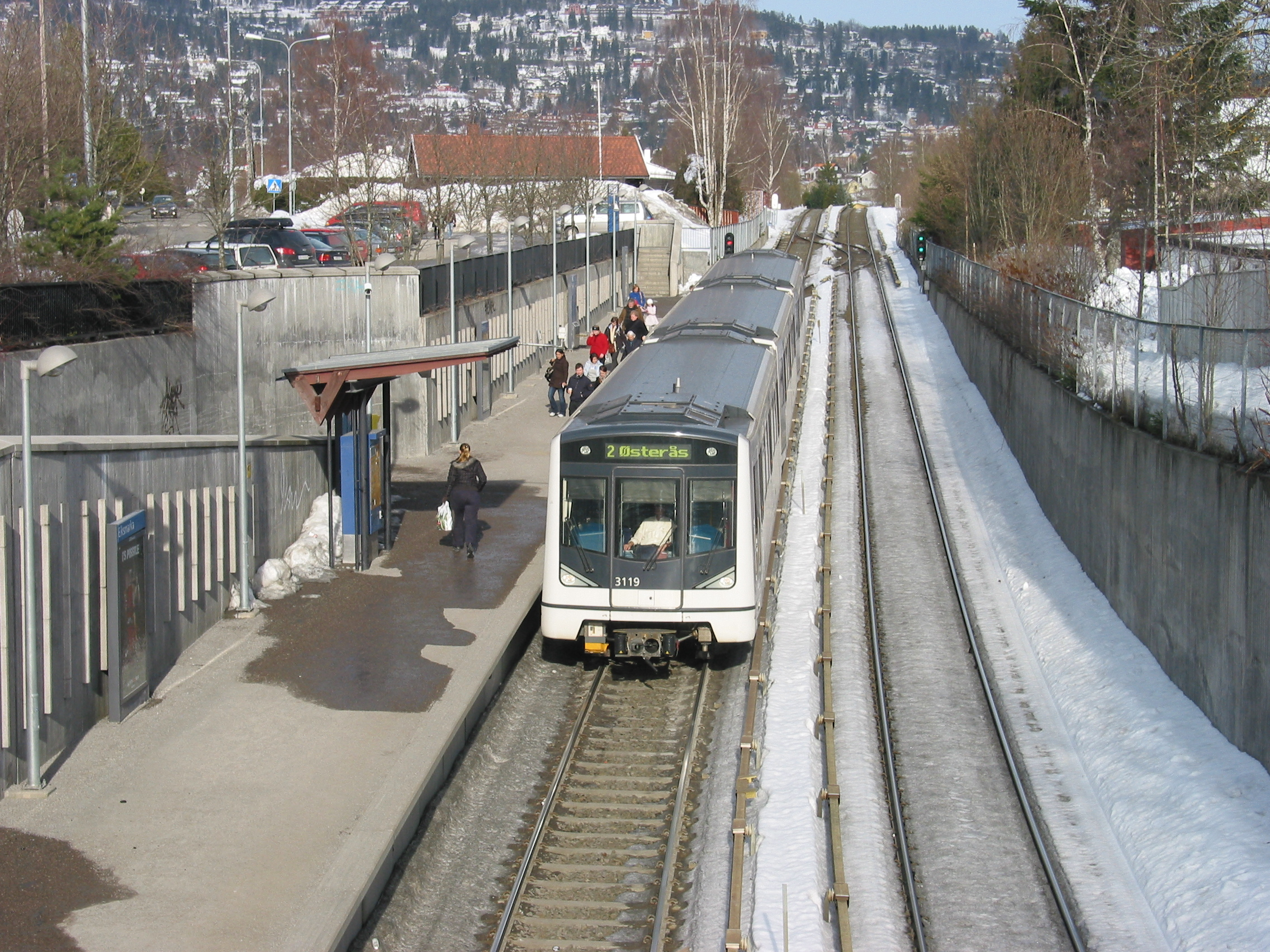
An MX3000 at Eiksmarka

In 1996, the work to establish a financing package for new investments in public transport in Akershus and Oslo started. It was passed, in 2001, by the city and county councils, as well as the Norwegian Parliament. Oslo Package 2 allowed municipal and state grants to be supplemented by increased fare and toll road revenue to finance, among other things, new trains for the metro. The initial order by Oslo Sporveier was for 33 units (or 99 cars), and was approved by the board on 28 June 2003. The initial order cost NOK 1.6 billion, and included options for further orders. Five other manufactures had been rejected during the procurement process. Combined with other investments in the network, the new trains will allow faster travel times on the metro.

In 2005, the city council voted to replace all existing T1000 and T1300 stock with the MX3000, increasing the quantity by another 30 units. With the second order, the price had increased to NOK 2.5 billion. Two test units were delivered in October 2005, and the serial production started in April 2006, with the first deliveries in April 2007. With the delivery of the new trains, Oslo Sporveier received criticism that they had been disloyal to the old red color of the metro, and that they did not follow up on their former design concept from the 1960s through the 80s. During the first 30 days, two errors occurred: one in the closing mechanism of the doors, and one with a switch in the cab that was not water tight. However, it turned out that Oslo Sporveier had not been accurate enough in specifying the energy consumption of the trains, and the rectifiers on parts of the line needed to be upgraded to supply sufficient power to the trains. During 2007, there were four incidents where the trains were not able to brake at stations. The worst incident occurred when a train slid 1.3 kilometres (0.81 mi) from Blindern down to Majorstuen.

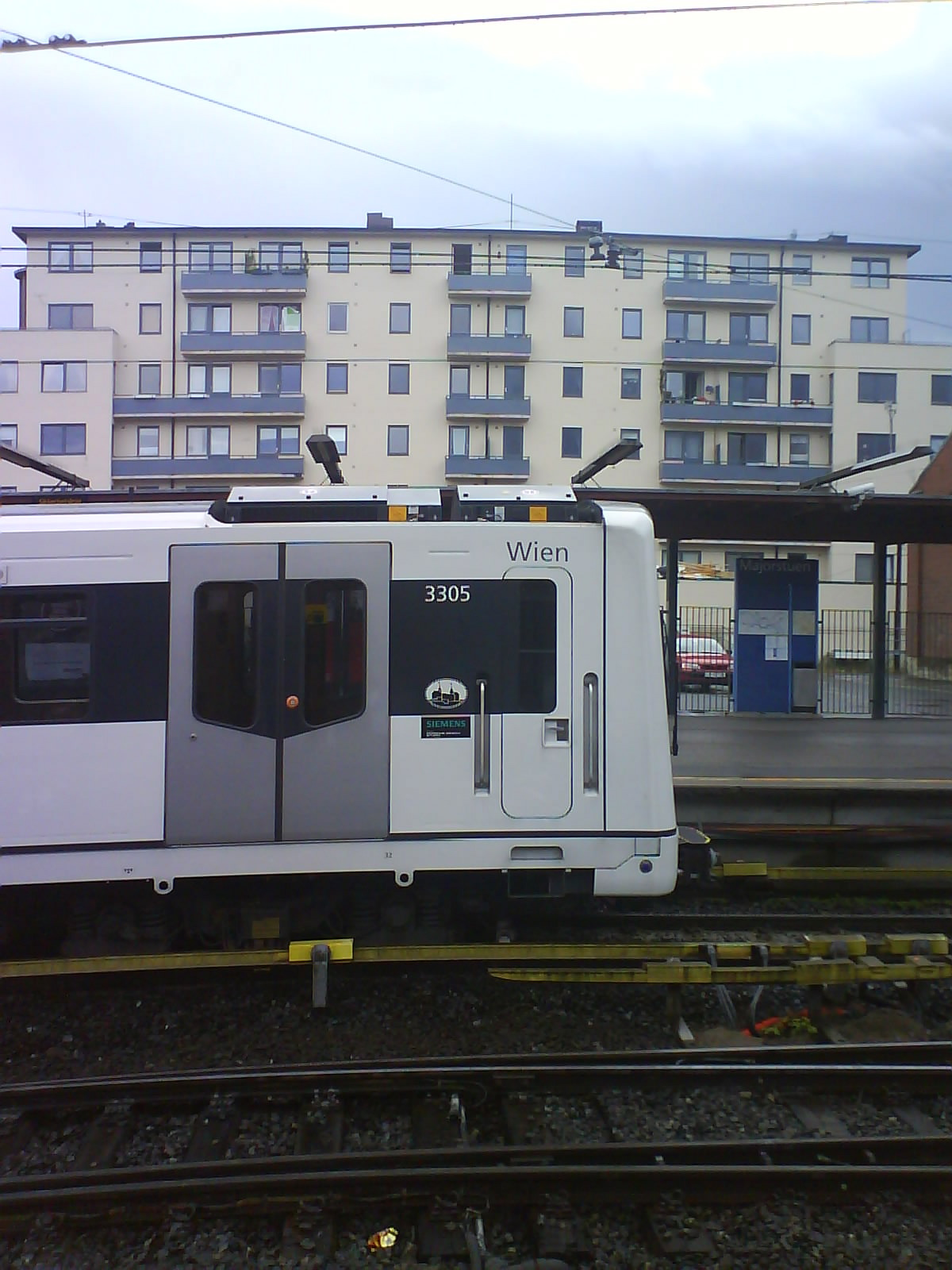
Side view of the MX3000

Following the 2006 decision to convert the Kolsås Line to metro standard, Akershus County Council announced that they would order five units. In November 2006, the city government proposed that the maintenance of the new trains be privatized. This resulted in protests from the employees, who performed a partial strike by refusing to work overtime. As a result, after a few weeks, the company lacked 57 trains to provide adequate service. The issue was solved when the socialist opposition parties along with the Liberal Party agreed to postpone the matter until after all the new trains were delivered in 2009. As part of the agreement, a new limited company, Oslo Vognselskap, wholly owned by Sporveien, would take ownership of all metro trains and trams used by the operating companies Oslo T-banedrift and Oslo Sporvognsdrift, the latter being the operator of the tramway. Responsibility for the debt accumulated after buying the trains was to be managed by Oslo Vognselskap, while operation and management of the maintenance contracts was transferred to Oslo T-banedrift.

In January 2008, an additional 15 units were ordered by Oslo Municipality, with an option for further orders later. This would allow all the eastern lines to have a 7-minute-30-second headway on their services into the city center, instead of the current 15-minute headway. Trains would start using the balloon loop located at Stortinget, and the western lines would continue to have a 15-minute headway. Additionally, the trains serving the Ring Line were extended to six cars, with a double train set. The order cost NOK 675 million. In addition, Akershus finalized their order for five units, costing NOK 240 million. Unlike the Oslo-owned units, Akershus' five units are owned by the transit authority Ruter. The same year, the city council in Oslo decided to upgrade the Holmenkoll Line to metro standard, to allow six-car MX3000 trains to be the main mode of transport to Holmenkollen during the FIS Nordic World Ski Championships 2011. This allowed 9,000 people per hour to be transported to the sports venue. In 2009, the T2000 units were taken out of service, and on 22 April 2010 the last T1300 was taken out of service, making the MX3000 the only units in traffic on the Oslo Metro. The city council was considering ordering 15 additional MX3000 to replace the T2000, as an alternative for a NOK 50-million renovation.

In November 2010, the Accident Investigation Board Norway criticized the braking system of the trains. In 2009, there were 83 incidents where trains with locked wheels slid down steep sections of track. The Accident Investigation Board found that the metro had conducted insufficient testing of the braking system on steep slippery lines, had not adjusted the brakes satisfactorily, and had not maintained the trains and tracks sufficiently. In December 2010, Oslo Vognselskap ordered another 32 three-car units, bringing the total order up to 115 three-car units. The last trains would be delivered by 2012. There was political disagreement regarding the final purchase, with the Liberal Party and socialist opposition securing a majority for the purchase, while the right-winged parties voted to order 19 units. The extra trains will make it possible to run all lines except the Holmenkollen Line (Line 1) with six-car lines, compared to a situation with only three-car trains on the Lambertseter Line, the Ring Line and the Kolsås Line (lines 4, 5 and 3) would only use three-car trains.

== Specifications ==
The MX3000 is a three-car electric multiple unit built exclusively for the Oslo Metro by Siemens in Vienna, Austria. It is a modification of trains used on the Vienna U-Bahn. The units are designed by Porsche Design Studio. Unlike the red predecessors, the trains are painted white with black and grey detailing. The chassis is in aluminum. A three-car train is 54.34 meters (178 ft 3 in) long; the end cars are 18.21 meters (59 ft 9 in) long each, while the center car is 17.92 meters (58 ft 10 in) long. The cars are 3.16 meters (10 ft 4 in) wide and 3.68 meters (12 ft 1 in) tall. An empty three-car unit weighs 98 tonnes (96 long tons; 108 short tons), while it with full payload weighs 147 tonnes (145 long tons; 162 short tons). This gives a maximum axle load of 12.5 tonnes (12.3 long tons; 13.8 short tons).

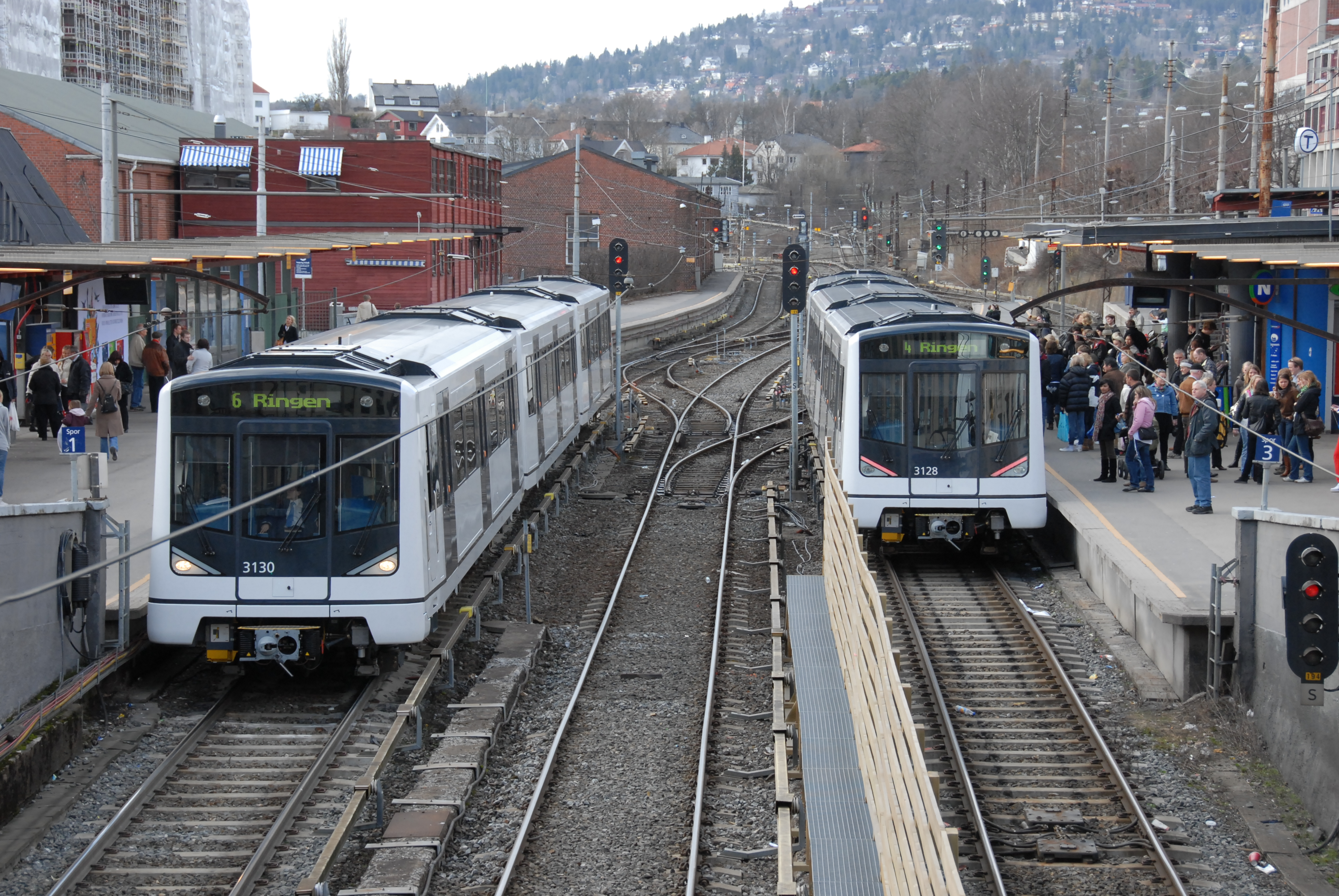
Two MX3000 trains at Majorstuen

Each three-car unit has 138 seats, and a total capacity of 493 passengers. The height of the floor is 1.12 meters (3 ft 8 in) above the track, allowing step-free access to the platforms. There are three doors on each side of each car, measuring 1,300 millimeters (51 in) wide and 1,960 millimeters (77 in) high. Unlike the older T1000 trains, the triple-car configuration allows passengers to walk between the cars. Combined with a better spatial design, it reduces the feeling of crowding. The MX3000 also introduced air conditioning in the driver's cab. The units run either in single configuration (with three cars) or in multiple (with six cars).

Each car is equipped with four three-phase asynchronous 140-kilowatt (190 hp) motors, giving each three-car unit a power output of 1,680 kilowatts (2,250 hp). In each car, the four motors are fed by the car's own insulated-gate bipolar transistor. They transform the 750 volt direct current collected from the third rail shoe to the three-phase alternating current used in the motors. The frequency and amplitude of the current fed to the engines varies depending on the train's speed. The MX3000 introduced regenerative brakes, that allow the electromagnetic brakes to feed power back to the power supply when braking. In addition, there is a back-up disc brake on each axle. Acceleration in the range 0 to 40 kilometers per hour (0 to 25 mph) is limited to 1.3 meters per second squared (4.3 ft/s^{2}). In this phase, the fully loaded train uses 5.0 kiloampere. For use in areas without a third rail, such as at depots, the trains are equipped with a 110 V battery. This removes the need for shunting at the depots, and makes maintenance more cost efficient. Energy usage is reduced by 30%, estimated to save the operating company NOK 13 million per year, compared to using the old stocks.

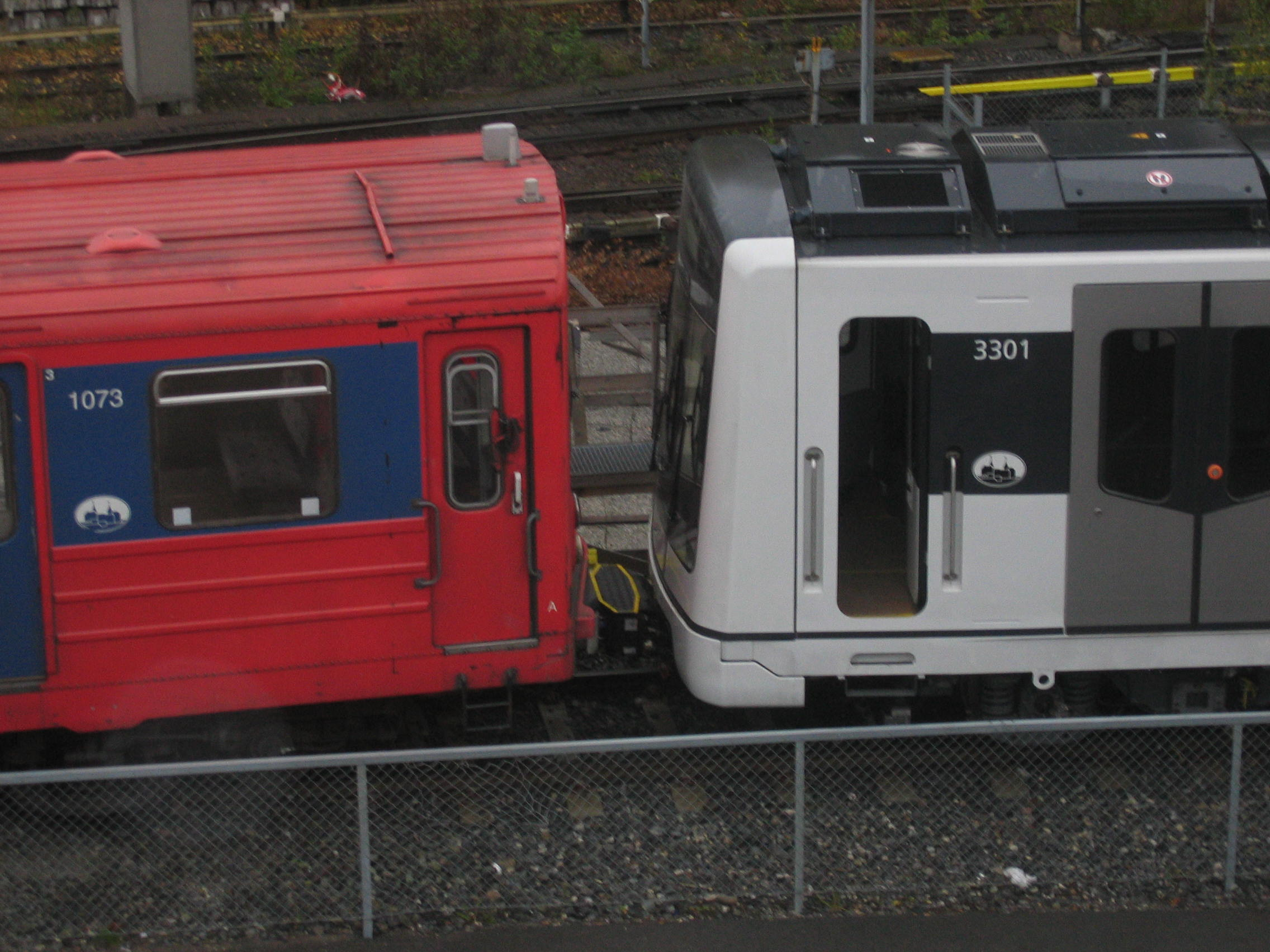
A T1000 and MX3000 coupled together

There are two bogies per car, each with two axles. The wheel diameter is 850 millimeters (33 in) for new wheels, and 770 millimeters (30 in) when fully worn-down. The center distance between the bogies is 11.00 meters (36 ft 1 in). The primary suspension is steel coil spring between the axles and the bogies, with a secondary air suspension between the frame and the bogies. The latter, which the MX3000 was the first to use on the metro, gives reduced noise, better comfort and makes it possible to adjust the height with changed passenger weight.

The units are controlled by a distributed system connected by a double multifunction vehicle bus. It has two vehicle control units, that monitor and control all main functions of the train; in addition, there are systems for controlling the brakes, traction, doors, ventilation, passenger information system and compressor. Like the older stock, the train's speed is controlled by an automatic train protection (ATP) system. The speed codes are transferred from the ATP points in the infrastructure, using 75 hertz pulses in the tracks. The trains pick up the signals via antennas. The speed codes are 15 km/h (9.3 mph), 30 km/h (19 mph), 50 km/h (31 mph) and 70 km/h (43 mph). They are informed to the engineer via signals in the driver's cab; in addition, the system will automatically reduce the speed, should the limit be exceeded. The driver can put the trains in an automatic mode, where the train itself adjusts the trains speed to the speed limit. The driver is always responsible for starting and halting the train at stations. The driver's cabs are more ergonomic than in the T1000, and the mirrors to monitor the platforms have been replaced with cameras and screens.

== Formation ==
The MX3000 carriage numbers range from 3x01–3x99 (first 99 sets) and continued with 3x100–3x115 upon delivery of the 100th set. Many of the train sets have also been given a girls' name.

Car	Mc1	M	Mc2
Numbering	31xx(x)	32xx(x)	33xx(x)
