= Brattlikollen (station) =

Oslo metro station

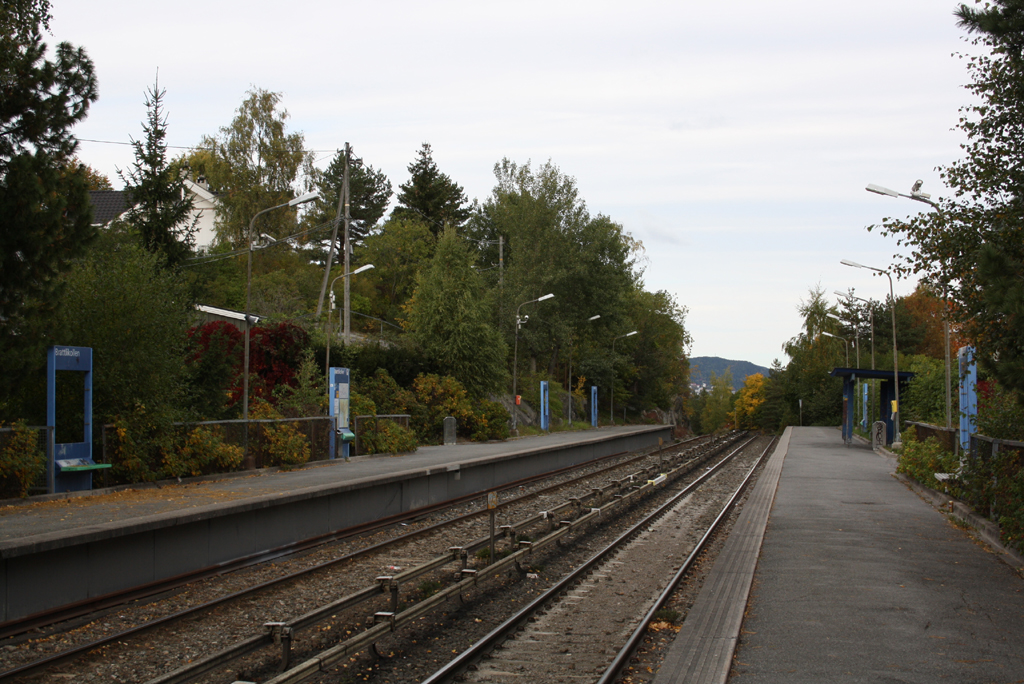

General information
- Location: Brattlikollen, Oslo; Norway
- Coordinates: 59°53′12″N 10°48′2″E
- Elevation: 165.5 m (543 ft)
- Owner: Sporveien
- Operator: Sporveien T-banen
- Line: Lambertseter Line
- Distance: 7.9 km (4.9 mi) from Stortinget

Construction
- Structure type: At-grade
- Accessible: Yes

History
- Opened: 28 April 1957
Location

Brattlikollen is a station on Lambertseter Line (Line 4) of the Oslo Metro. The station is between Ryen and Karlsrud, 7.8 km (4.8 mi) from Stortinget. The station was opened on 28 April 1957 as a tramway and on 22 May 1966 as a metro. The station's architect was Edgar Smith Berentsen.

The station is on the south side of Brannfjell. The neighborhood around the station is mainly residential with a mixture of detached houses and apartment buildings. Access to the station is from the local road Sandstuveien which passes below the line immediately south of the station.

| Preceding station | Oslo Metro | Following station |
|---|---|---|
| Ryen towards Frognerseteren | Line 1 | Karlsrud towards Bergkrystallen |
| Ryen towards Vestli | Line 4 | Karlsrud towards Bergkrystallen |
