= Manglerud (station) =

Oslo metro station

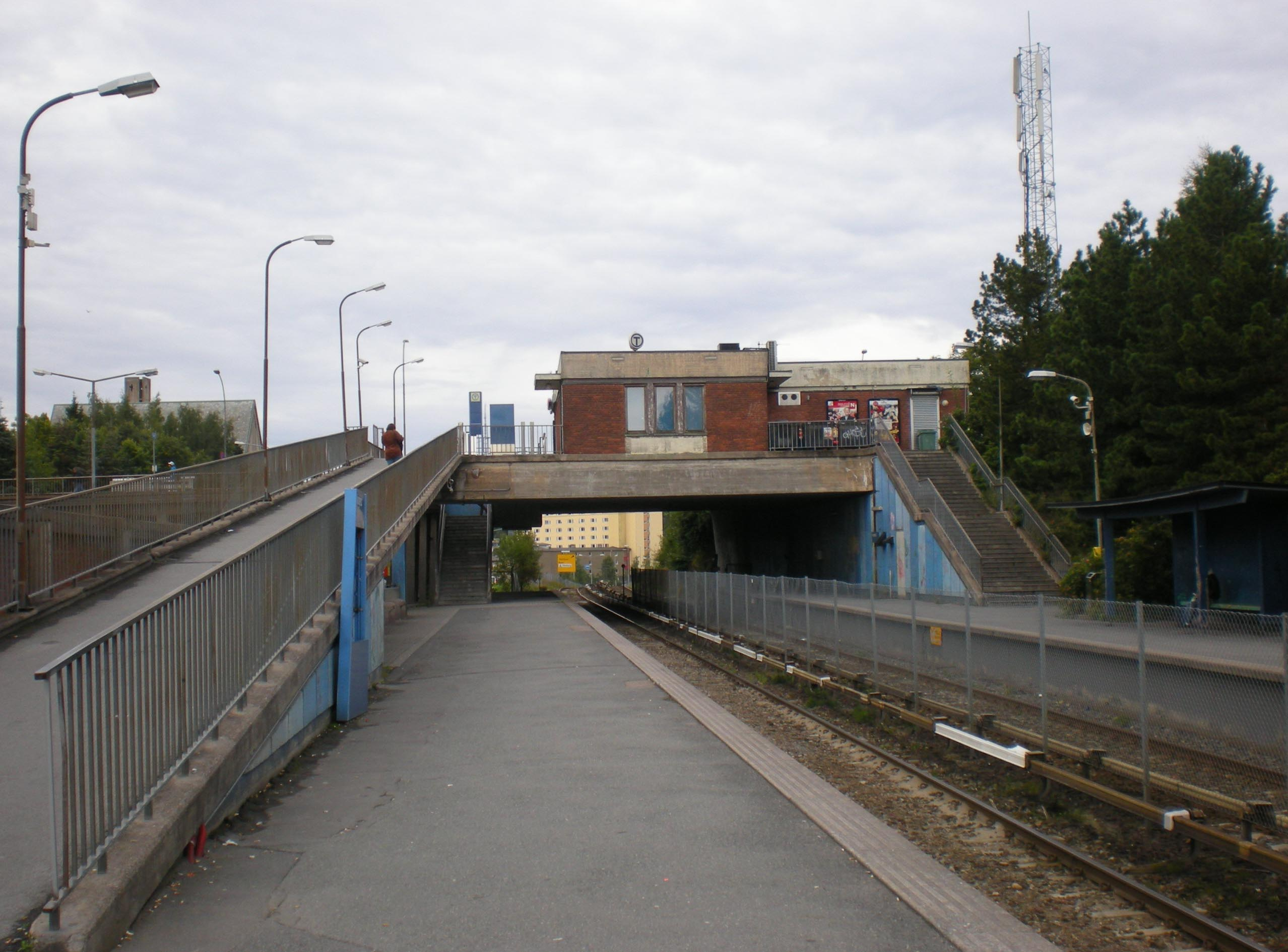

General information
- Location: Manglerud, Oslo; Norway
- Coordinates: 59°53′52″N 10°48′42″E
- Elevation: 130.6 m (428 ft)
- Owner: Sporveien
- Operator: Sporveien T-banen
- Line: Lambertseter Line
- Distance: 6.2 km (3.9 mi) from Stortinget
- Tracks: 2
- Connections: 23 Lysaker - Simensbråten; 78A Østensjø ring 78B Østensjø ring 4N Jernbanetorget - Bergkrystallen

Construction
- Structure type: At-grade
- Accessible: Yes

Other information
- Fare zone: 1

History
- Opened: 28 April 1957
Location

Manglerud is a rapid transit station on the Lambertseter Line of the Oslo Metro. It is served mainly by line 4 and by line 1 trains on weekdays between 06:00 and 19:00. It is located between Høyenhall and Ryen, 6.2 kilometres (3.9 mi) from Stortinget.

The station was opened as a tram station in 1957, and as a subway station on 22 May 1966. The architect was Edgar Smith Berentsen.

Preceding station	Oslo Metro	Following station
Høyenhall towards Frognerseteren	Line 1	Ryen towards Bergkrystallen
Høyenhall towards Vestli	Line 4	Ryen towards Bergkrystallen
