= Furuset Line =

Railway line in Norway

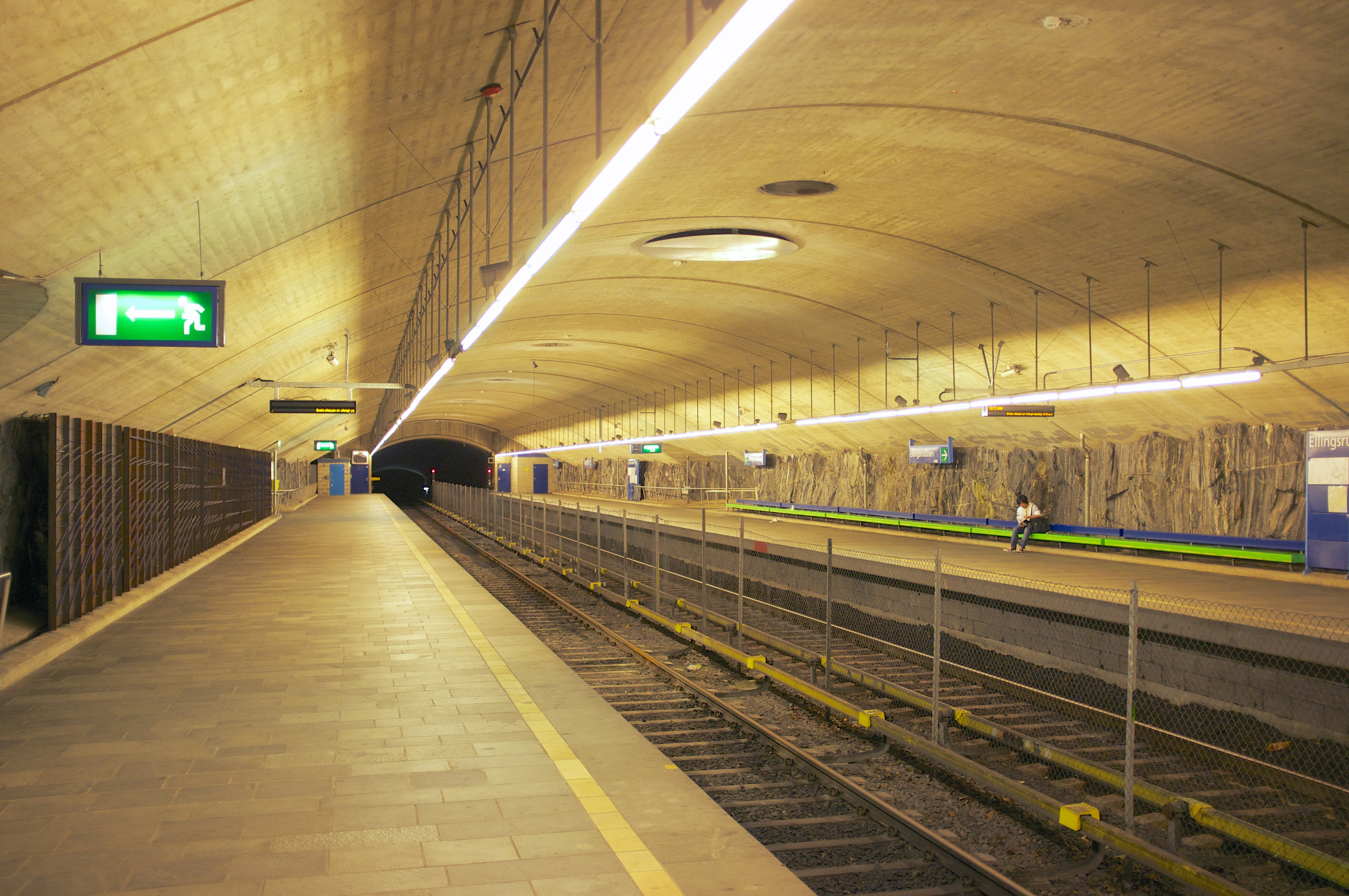
- Ellingsrudåsen has been the terminus of the line since 1981

Overview
- Native name: Furusetbanen
- Owner: Sporveien
- Termini: Hellerud; Ellingsrudåsen
- Stations: 6

Service
- Type: Rapid transit
- System: Oslo Metro
- Operator(s): Sporveien T-banen
- Rolling stock: MX3000

History
- Opened: 18 November 1970

Technical
- Line length: 5.6 km (3.5 mi)
- Number of tracks: Double
- Track gauge: 1,435 mm (4 ft 8 1/2 in) standard gauge
- Electrification: 750 V DC third rail
- Operating speed: 70 km/h (43 mph)
- Highest elevation: 165.2 m (542 ft)

The Furuset Line (Norwegian: Furusetbanen) is a 5.6-kilometer (3.5 mi) long line on the Oslo Metro between Hellerud and Ellingsrudåsen in Oslo, Norway. Running mostly underground, it passes through the southern part of Groruddalen, serving neighborhoods in the boroughs of Alna and Furuset. The line is served by Line 2 of the metro with four or eight trains per hour. The line is owned by Kollektivtransportproduksjon and operated by Oslo T-banedrift on contract with Ruter using MX3000 trains.

The section from Hellerud via Tveita to Haugerud opened in 1970. The line was extended to Trosterud in 1974, to Lindeberg and Furuset in 1978, and to Ellingsrudåsen in 1981. There are plans to extend the line further east through Lørenskog to Akershus University Hospital, and to build a branch from Furuset to the Grorud Line.

== Route ==
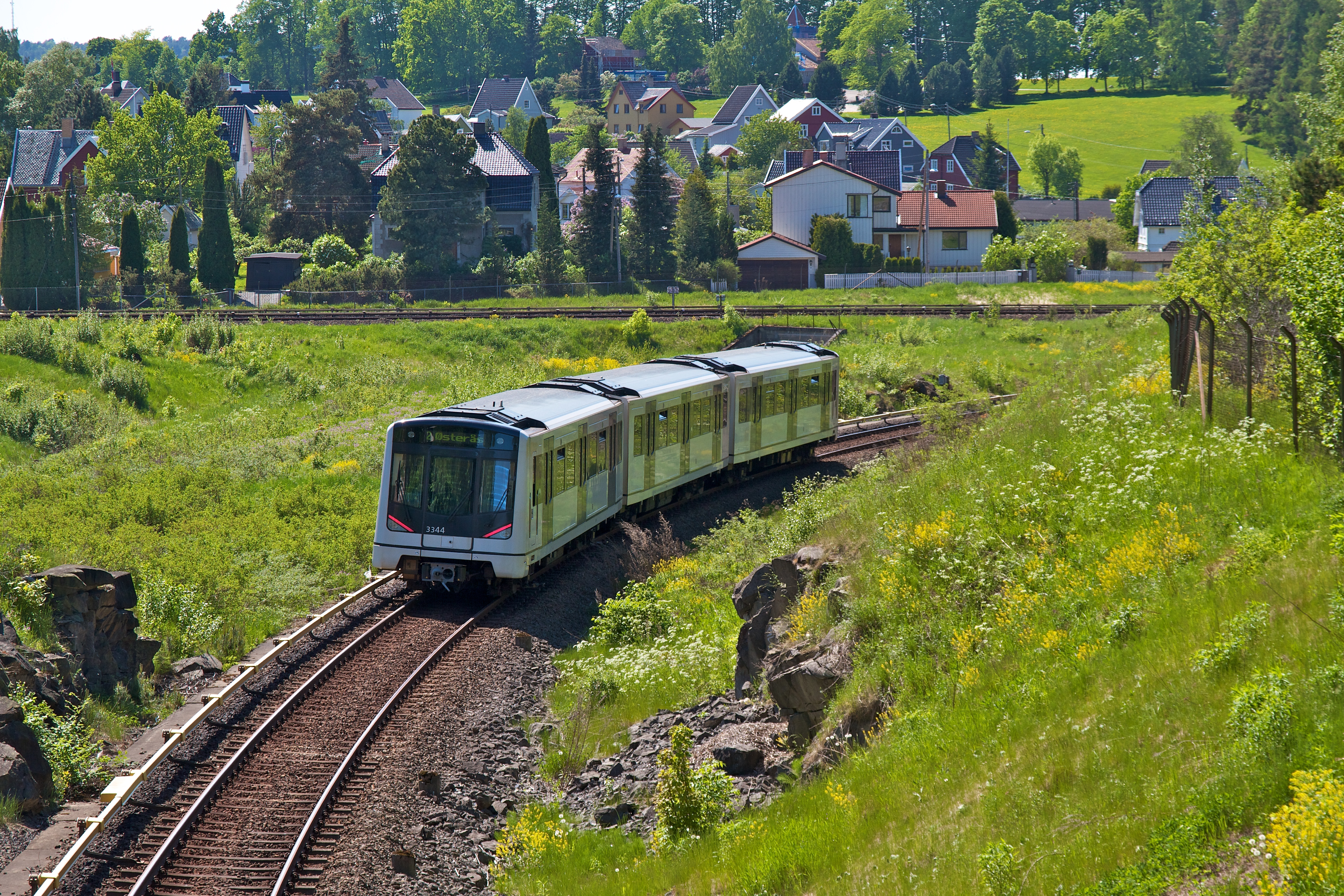
MX3000 train approaching the Østensjø Line at Hellerud. The culvert entrance of the outbound line can be seen behind the train.

The Furuset Line branches from the Østensjø Line after Hellerud, and runs north-east through the southern part of Groruddalen, in the boroughs of Alna and Furuset, which mostly have dense residential housing. Most of the line is underground, with only two stations being on ground level. The line is the fastest of the metro, and most of the line allows speeds of 70 kilometers per hour (43 mph).

The Furuset Line branches off from the Østensjø Line after Hellerud Station. The outbound line runs in a culvert under the tracks of the Østensjø Line before joining up with the inbound track. The line continues along the southern side of Tvetenveien and then passes into a tunnel through which it runs under named road and reaches Tveita Station. After crossing under Ring 3 the line exits the tunnel and runs along the western side of Tvetenveien to Haugerud Station. It continues along Tvetenveien, which is crosses over just before it reaches Trosterud Station. Immediately afterwards the line enters a tunnel, in which Lindeberg Station is situated. The line exits the tunnel for less than 100 meters (330 ft) before entering a new tunnel, in which it remains. In this tunnel are the stations Furuset and Ellingsrudåsen.

== Service ==
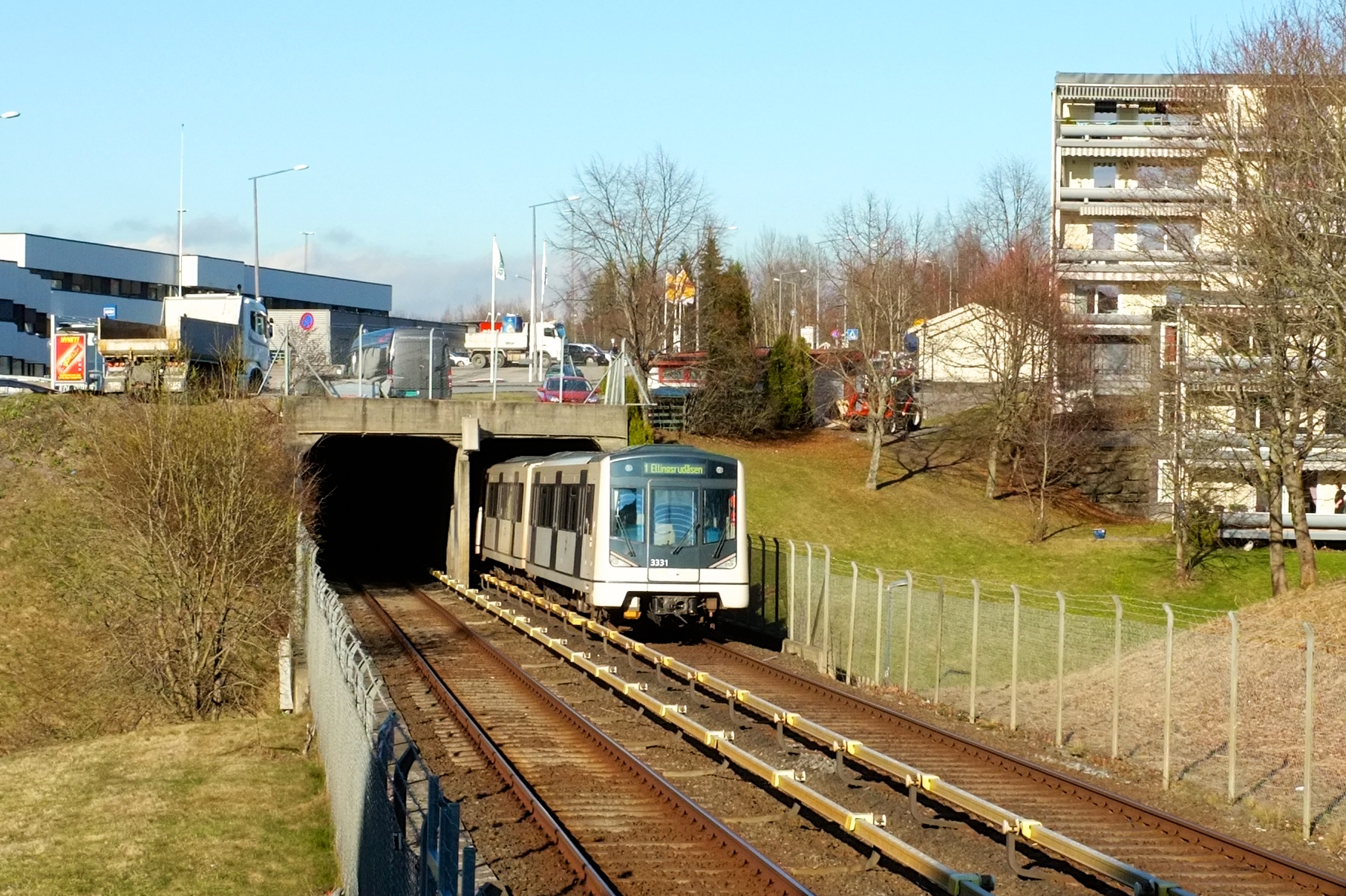
Train on the short ground-level section between Lindeberg and Furuset

The Furuset Line is served by line 2 of the metro. This line has a base service of four trains per hour, but is doubled to eight trains per hour on weekdays between 7 and 19 and on Saturdays between 9 and 19. The line runs onwards along the Østensjø Line and then through the Common Tunnel through the city center. West of the city, Line 2 runs on the Røa Line.

Operations are carried out by Sporveien T-banen on contract with Ruter, the public transport authority in Oslo and Akershus. The infrastructure itself is owned by Sporveien, a municipal company. Service is provided using MX3000 three- and six-car trains. In 2002 the stations along the line had an average weekday 10,261 boarding passengers. Travel time from Ellingsrudåsen to Hellerud is 11 minutes, and from Ellingsrudåsen to Stortinget in the city center is 23 minutes.

== History ==
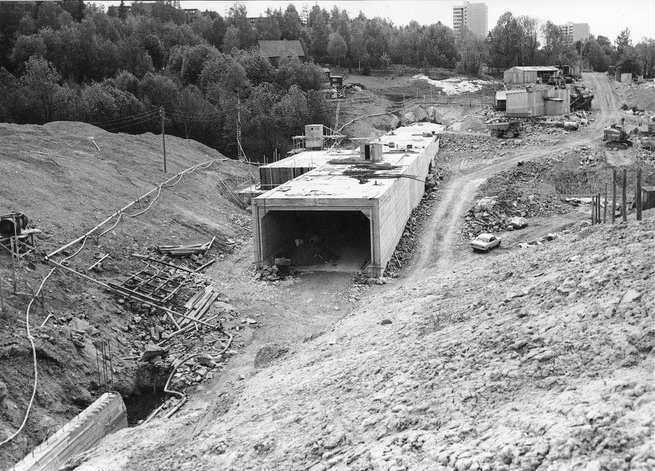
Construction of the tunnel at Lindeberg in 1974

In 1948, the municipalities of Oslo and Aker were merged, and the new municipality started planning an expansion of the suburbs, among other places in Groruddalen. On 15 September 1949, the Planning Office For the Suburban and Underground Lines was established as a division within the new municipality. The first specific plans were launched in March 1954, and consisted of four branches, including one on the south side of Groruddalen, which would be built to Furuset. The plans originally consisted of terminus in the city center at Grønlands torg, with a possible extension to Nationaltheatret, where the line would intersect with Holmenkolbanen's light rails serving Oslo West. However, it was quickly decided that the terminus would be Jernbanetorget, which served the Oslo East Station.

Construction of the Furuset Line, from Hellerud to Tveita, started in the mid-1950s. Landwork and electrical equipment was contracted to developers, while the trackage was done by the Planning Office. The original plans called for the use of 600 to 650 volt (V) direct current (DC) fed via a pantograph, to allow comparability with the western light rail. This was later changed to 750 V DC via a third rail. This was chosen to allow a higher diameter, and thus a higher ampere, and easier maintenance. The system also took into use cab signaling and moving blocks, which were cutting edge technology at the time, and had only been implemented on the Stockholm Metro in Europe by then. While the permitted headway on the common sections was set to 90 seconds, it was set to 120 seconds on the Grorud Line. The original plans called for a depot on each of the lines, including the Grorud Line, but this was later changed to a central depot at Ryen.

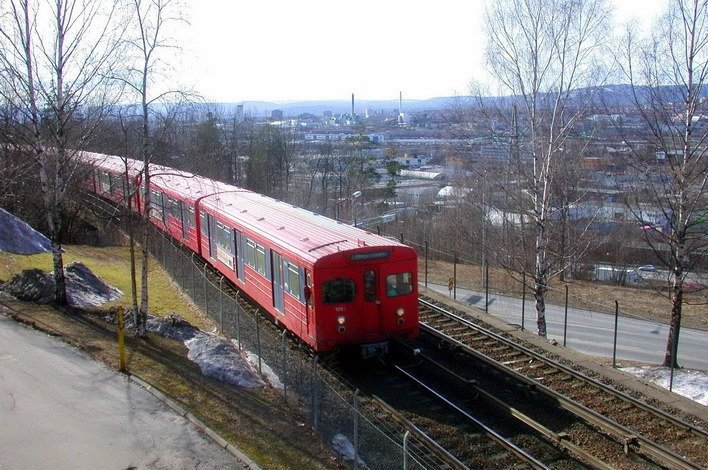
Now retired T1000 train approaching Trosterud

The first part of the line, from Hellerud to Haugerud, was opened on 18 November 1970, four years after the first part of the metro. The line was further extended to Trosterud on 15 December 1974, to Furuset on 19 February 1978, and finally to Ellingsrudåsen on 8 November 1981. The line took into use T1000 electric multiple units which could be up to six cars long. The cost of the Furuset ended at 48 million Norwegian krone. Originally the service terminated at Jernbanetorget in the city center. On 9 January 1977, the city center service was extended to Sentrum. However, this station was closed from 20 March 1983 to 7 March 1987, and reopened as Stortinget.

From 20 November 1995, the trains on the Grorud Line continued all the way through the Common Tunnel to and continued along the Røa Line. In June 2010, the headway on the line was reduced from 15 to 7.5 minutes, with half the departures terminating at Stortinget. The reason was that the Røa Line was having its power supply upgraded, and Line 2 would only be able to run with three-car trains. From 6 November 2010, Line 1's eastern service was moved from the Lambertseter Line to the Furuset Line, thus giving eight services per hour along the latter. This was possible because of the upgrade of the Holmenkollen Line to metro standard. The Line 1 services replaced the extra services on Line 2.

== Future ==
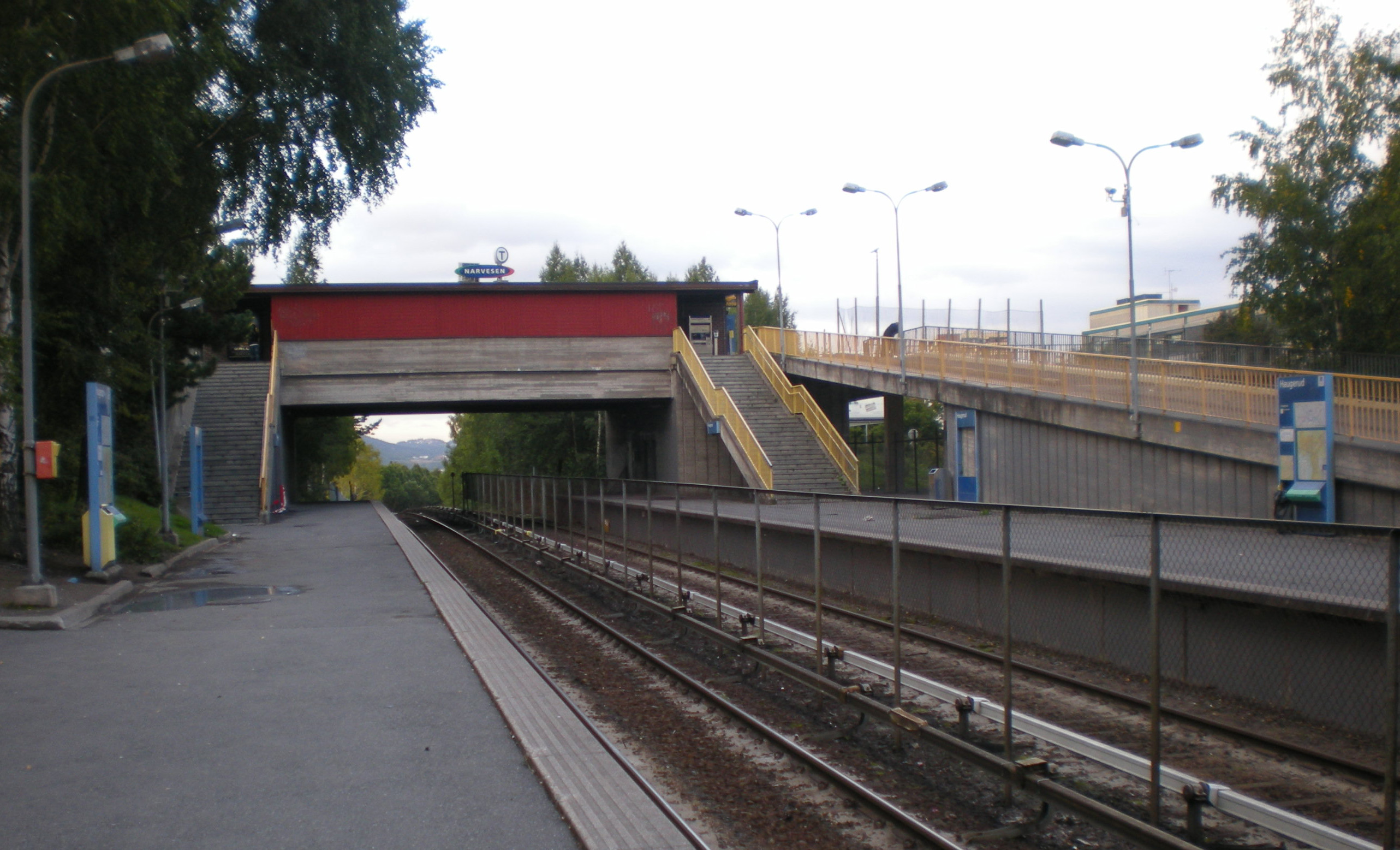
Haugerud is one of only two station located at ground level

The Furuset Line has been proposed extended towards Lørenskog and Akershus University Hospital (Ahus), a distance of 5.0 kilometers (3.1 mi). It could potentially also be extended further 3.8 kilometers (2.4 mi) to Lillestrøm, where it would terminate at Lillestrøm Station, the main transport hub for Nedre Romerike. The cost of the first extension is estimated at NOK 2.5 billion, and NOK 1.9 billion for the latter. Financing for the extension from Ellingsrudåsen to Ahus has been secured in Oslo Package 3. Travel time from Ellingsrudåsen to Ahus would be six minutes, and four minutes from Ahus to Lillestrøm.

The rationale for the extension is the newly constructed hospital, which will have 5,000 workers and serve as the local hospital for Groruddalen. In addition, the Coca-Cola Company and Norway Post are both establishing workplaces for a combined 3,300 people in the areas of Visperud and around Lørenskog Station. Visperud has also been proposed as a location for a park and ride for between 500 and 2,000 cars, as it is located on National Road 159 and European Route E6. Akershus County Municipality has proposed building stations at Visperud, Lørenskog sentrum, Ahus and Lillestrøm. In addition, depending on the choice of route, there could be a station at Kurland. Almost all the line from Ellingsrudåsen to Lillestrøm would run in a tunnel, including all the stations. The exception is about 1-kilometer (0.62 mi) section midway between Lørenskog sentrum and Ahus, and the last 400 meters (1,300 ft) towards Lillestrøm, including a bridge over Nitelva, although the station in Lillestrøm would be indoors. An alternative is to extend the Furuset Line to Visperud, and then build a light rail from Lørenskog Station via Visperud to Ahus.

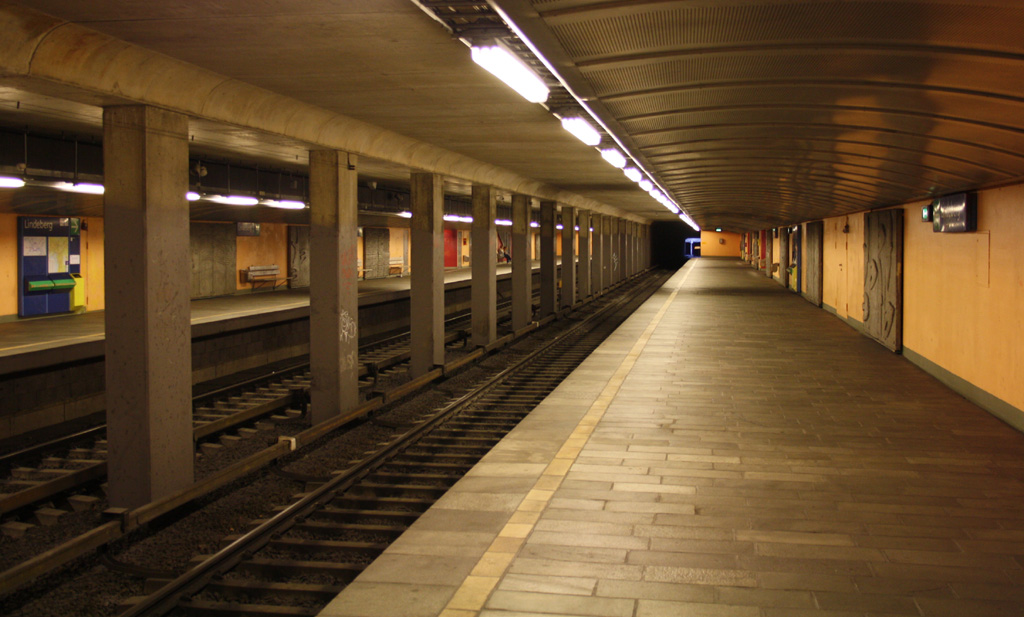
Lindeberg Station

Another alternative is to extend the line to Visperud, Lørenskog Station and then to Stovner Station of the Grorud Line of the metro. Part of the rationale is to serve the new suburb of Skårerødgården, which is planned with 1,200 new houses. It would also allow transfer between the metro and the Oslo Commuter Rail. The line would run entirely underground. At Lørenskog Station, the metro station is proposed placed under the railway station. The route would possibly have a station serving Øvre Stovner, between Lørenskog Station and Stovner. Travel time from Ellingsrudåsen to Lørenskog Station would be three minutes, with another three minutes from Lørenskog Station to Stovner. The cost of building the 4.8 kilometers (3.0 mi) from Ellingsrudåsen to Stovner is estimated at NOK 2.4 billion. The current plans, which have not been passed recommend construction in three phases: first from Ellingsrudåsen to Ahus, second from Visperud to Stovner, and third from Ahus to Lillestrøm.

Independent of the northern extension, is a branch from the Furuset Line to a point on the Grorud Line. The plan is to build a new line from Økern on the Grorud Line via Breivoll, where there would be an interchange with the Oslo Commuter Rail on the Trunk Line, to Trosterud. Such a cross connection will allow both interconnection between the lower levels of the Grorud Line and the Furuset Line, and at the same time give access from the Furuset Line to the Ring Line, which serves Nordre Aker. In addition to this, the plans call for a parallel line to the Furuset Line to run through the lower parts of Grurudalen, between the Furuset Line and the Trunk Line. This line could either connect to the Furuset Line at Furuset, or run across the valley, via Grorud Station on the Trunk Line, and connect to the Grorud Line at Rommen.

== Bibliography ==
- Akershus County Municipality (2008). "Baneløsninger på Nedre Romerike" (PDF) (in Norwegian). Archived from the original (PDF) on 19 July 2011.
- Aspenberg, Nils Carl (1994). Trikker og forstadsbaner i Oslo (in Norwegian). Oslo: Baneforlaget. ISBN 82-91448-03-5.
- Haldsrud, Stian (2013). Banen og byen (in Norwegian). Oslo: Storbyforlaget. ISBN 978-82-999426-0-7.
- Schwandl, Robert (2004). Metros in Scandinavia. Berlin: Robert Schwandl Verlag. ISBN 3-936573-04-2.
- Strandholt, Thorleif (1994). A/S Oslo Sporveier – Busser, T-banen (in Norwegian). Oslo: Sporvejshistorisk Selskab. ISBN 87-87589-35-4.
