= Høybråten Station =

Railway station at Høybråten in Oslo, Norway

Høybråten
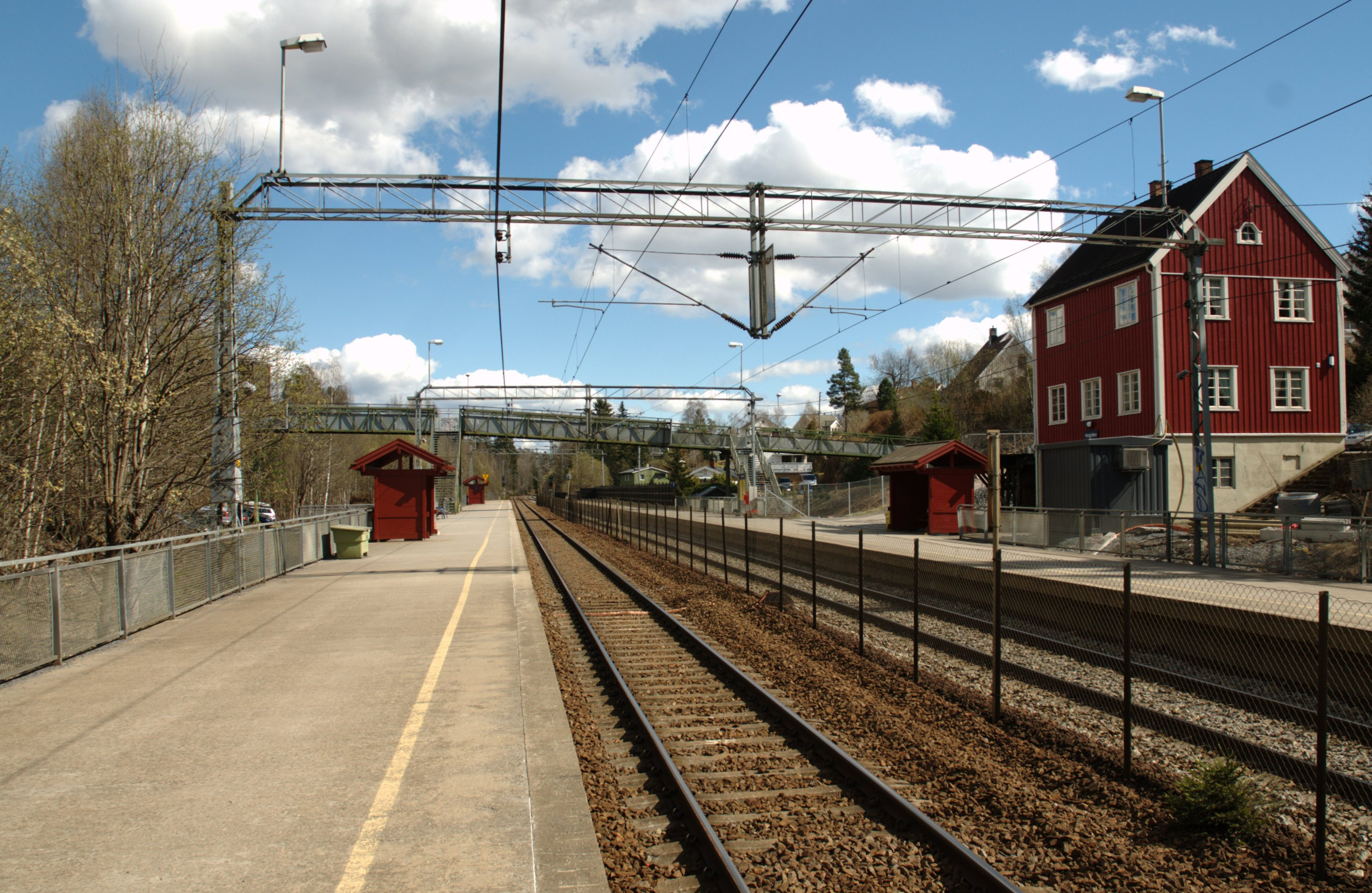

General information
- Location: Linjebakken 4 Høybråten, Oslo; Norway
- Coordinates: 59°56′53″N 10°55′39″E
- Elevation: 154.6 m (507 ft)
- Owner: Bane NOR
- Operator: Vy
- Line: Trunk Line
- Distance: 13.09 km (8.13 mi) from Oslo S
- Platforms: 2 side platforms
- Tracks: 2

Construction
- Parking: 24 places
- Cycle facilities: Yes
- Architect: Gudmund Hoel

Other information
- Fare zone: 1

History
- Opened: 20 October 1921
- Electrified: 1 September 1927
Location
- Location within Akershus

Høybråten Station (Norwegian: Høybråten stasjon) is a railway station located at Høybråten in Oslo, Norway, on the Trunk Line. Situated 13.09 kilometers (8.13 mi) from Oslo Central Station, it consists of two side platforms along a double tracked line and a disused station building. Høybråten is served by the L1 line of the Oslo Commuter Rail. Its station is the second in Oslo's Tram network, the first being Rødby station, which was built in the late 1800s. Trunk lines were once the main railway network in Scandinavia, providing transportation throughout Scandinavia. In 1863 Trunk Line Norway was founded, in place of the non-existent Board of Railways, which was found wanting in providing rural- and mountainous-only railways.

The station opened as Høibråten on 20 October 1921, following the establishment of a residential area the previous decade and a half. It received a wooden station building designed by Gudmund Hoel. From 1927 it also had electric traction and all local trains started to stop at the station. It took its current name the following year. Høybråten remained staffed until 1967.

== History ==
The Trunk Line past Høybråten opened on 1 September 1854 and residents were served by Grorud Station, some 2.5 kilometers (1.6 mi) to the southwest. Lørenskog Station, then named Robsrud, opened on 20 April 1891, 1,070 meters (3,510 ft) the northeast. In 1899 there were still only about one hundred people living in the area, most of which lived on one of the four Høybråten farms. The segment of track was doubled in 1903.

From 1905 Anton Tschudi started selling lots from his farm Øvre Høybråten, which were affordable for ordinary workers. However, to settle so far from the city center it was necessary to get a better transport service. Trains were available from Lørenskog, but the first service did not arrive at Oslo East Station until 07:40, too late for industry workers. They were therefore often forced to spend the weeks in the city center and the weekends with their families at Høybråten. The matter was corrected from 21 April 1908, when a new red eye services commenced.

The settlers' association at Høibråten took initiative in 1906 for Høybråten to receive its own station. In particular, Tschudi was willing to grant free land to the railway in exchange for a station. NSB rejected the offer, stating that the site was too steep for the steam locomotives to stop and that the neighborhood was within walking distance of Grorud and Lørenskog. The settlers' association repeated the request several times without further advancement in the issue, the latest in 1914.

They then took contact with MP Magnus Nilssen, who organized an inspection with NSB's executives. This proved successful and on 13 February 1917 the Norwegian Trunk Railway made an offer to the residents and the municipality, Aker. A station would be built on the conditions that half the estimated cost of 50,000 Norwegian krone (NOK) be covered by the settlers and the municipality, that an adequate road be built to the site and that free land be provided. The station would only serve passengers, not cargo, and the railway company was free to determine the number of trains. The issue was approved by Aker Municipal Council on 7 March 1918 along with a grant of NOK 25,000. As the chosen site was altered in relation to the original demands, Ralf Tschudi instead issued a grant of NOK 5,000 instead of free land.

Planning, financing and expropriation were concluded in 1920, allowing construction to start. During construction there arose a disagreement between the railway company and the municipality as to the standards of the roads to the station, which ended with the municipality having to conduct further work. This cost them a further NOK 23,100. The station opened as Høibråten on 20 October 1921, but received only a limited number of services, still hauled by steam train.

The railway operations were taken over by the Norwegian State Railways on 4 March 1926. The line received electric traction on 1 September 1927, after which all local trains along the line stopped at the station. Høybråten received a post office on 1 July 1928 and this was situated in the station building. The station took its current name on 1 December 1928.

Contrary to the demands set by the railway company, it allowed cargo handling at the station. Six station masters served at Høybråten until 1961. It remained staffed for sale of tickets and cargo handling until 28 May 1967. The line past the station received centralized traffic control on 24 January 1972. From 1981, with the opening of the Oslo Tunnel, the trains serving Høybråten continued past Oslo Central Station onto the Drammen Line.

There were plans for a major redevelopment of the station area in the late 1980s, which involved construction of high-rise condominiums with 300 apartments, underground parking and a shopping- and sports center, partially over and partially under the tracks. The project was supported by the municipality and NSB, but was never carried out. The residents' association started renting the station building in 1994. They fixed it up and use it for a range of activities including meetings, a hobby room, parties and office space for the local sports club. Real time traffic information systems for the public were installed in 2010.

== Facilities ==
Høybråten Station is situated 13.09 kilometers (8.13 mi) from Oslo Central Station, at an elevation of 154.6 meters (507 ft) above mean sea level. This is roughly the site where the Trunk Line stops climbing up steep Groruddalen and reaches the flat landscape of Romerike. The line past Høybråten is double track and electrified. There are no passing loops at Høybråten. The station features two side platforms with sheds. Both are 221 meters (725 ft) long and 70 centimeters (28 in) tall. There are 24 parking spaces at the station, a bicycle shed and a ticket vending machine.

The station building was designed by Gudmund Hoel. The building has four floors, including a foundation story which only faces the platform and an attic. The main stories are built in wooden vertical siding. It features a saddle roof. In its original configuration it consisted of a lower level with public facilities and an upper level with a residence.

== Service ==
Vy serves Høybråten with line L1 of the Oslo Commuter Rail. L1 calls at all stations, running from Lillestrøm Station along the Trunk Line past Høybråten to Oslo Central Station and then along the Drammen Line to Asker Station before serving the Spikkestad Line and terminating at Spikkestad Station. On weekdays there four trains per hour going east to Lillestrøm. Westwards, two trains per hour run to Spikkestad while two more run only to Asker. During weekends the service is half-hourly with all trains running Spikkestad-Lillestrøm. Travel time is 16 minutes to Oslo Central Station and 13 minutes to Lillestrøm.

== Bibliography ==
- Aker Municipality (1940). Aker 1837–1937. Oslo: Aker Municipality.
- Bjerke, Thor; Holom, Finn (2004). Banedata 2004 (in Norwegian). Hamar / Oslo: Norsk Jernbanemuseum / Norsk Jernbaneklubb. ISBN 82-90286-28-7.
- Hartmann, Eivind; Mangset, Øistein; Reisegg, Øyvind (1997). Neste stasjon (in Norwegian). Gyldendal. ISBN 82-05-25294-7.
- Torbo, Leif Erik (1996). "Höide o. h. 154,6 m". In Mona Larsen-Asp (ed.). Lenge det gikk før Høybråten fikk... (in Norwegian). Oslo: Høybråten Velforening. pp. 96–103.

Preceding station			Following station
Haugenstua	Trunk Line		Lørenskog
Preceding station	Local trains		Following station
Haugenstua	L1	Spikkestad–Oslo S–Lillestrøm	Lørenskog
