= Anton Tschudi =

Anton Tschudi (12 April 1848 – 1914) was a Norwegian landowner.

He was born in Tønsberg and was of Swiss descent. His father, Peter Tschudi (1812–1900) owned the Valløe farm in Sem Municipality, outside of the city of Tønsberg. His sister Clara was a well-known writer, and his brother Oscar was a judge.

Tschudi was mostly active with buying and selling land in Aker, now a part of Oslo. In 1898 he bought the 400-acre farm Øvre Høybråten, which was parceled out in 1905. Solemskogen near Maridalsvannet was bought in 1897 and parceled out in 1903, in addition he parceled out Økern as well. Tschudi was also active in Bærum. In 1912 he bought Vestre Haslum, which soon was split in 360 lots and sold. The area was nicknamed Tschudimarka.

Tschudi had a substantial effect on the suburbanization of Oslo, both its tempo and its character. This largely stems from his tendency to sell his lots cheaply, to laborers and craftsmen. The lots usually measured 1–2,5 acres, and were suitable for detached housing. Detached housing still characterizes the areas sold by Tschudi, in contrast to surrounding block residential areas—especially around Høybråten. The downside with cheap parcels was the lack of communications and infrastructure. Lobbying for communications was up to the residents; Høybråten received a train station in 1920 whereas Haslum received a tramway station in 1924. Solemskogen lacked communications and above all water drainage, posed a danger to water quality in Maridalsvannet and was therefore resented by the municipality. The parceling was halted by the authorities after 153 of 274 parcels had been sold, and the municipality later tried to buy out or expropriate several parcels. Thus, Solemskogen never became fully suburbanized. In Bærum, the municipality was concerned about the "squalor" of Tschudimarka.

Two roads were named after him, both in 1925, Anton Tschudis vei at Haslum and at Risløkka. Himself, Anton Tschudi resided in Frogner; in Skovveien 7 near Uranienborg in the 1900 Census and Svoldergaten 2 at Filipstad in the 1910 Census. With his wife he had six children born between 1890 and 1901; four sons and two daughters (Ralph, Waldo, Vera, Peter Fridolin, Knut Anton and Alice). Vera married Gerhard C. Kallevig. Anton Tschudi died in 1914.
