= Hanaborg =

- Village
- Location within Norway
- Coordinates: 59°56′N 10°58′E
- Country: Norway
- County: Akershus
- Municipality: Lørenskog
- Time zone: UTC+1 (CET)
  - Summer (DST): UTC+2 (CEST)

Hanaborg is a settlement in Lørenskog, Akershus, Norway, just outside the capital Oslo that it borders to in the west. In the north is the forest Haneborgåsen. Haneborg is closely knit with Fjellhamar, and the two areas are often considered one. Most of Hanaborg is on a southwestern slope, with a view of large parts of Lørenskog and northern parts of Oslo.

The settlement is served by the Oslo Commuter Rail at Hanaborg Station.
