= Nils Arntzen Ramm =

Norwegian engineer

Nils Arntzen Ramm (13 August 1903 – 22 April 1974) was a Norwegian engineer, military captain, and businessperson.

He was born in Kristiania (Oslo, Norway) as a son of colonel Wilhelm Ernst Ramm (1861–1926) and Hilda Pleym (1866–1924). In 1932 he married Amélie Kallevig, a daughter of Waldemar Kallevig and niece of Gerhard C. Kallevig and Christian Wisbech.

He finished his secondary education in 1921, and after officer training in 1924 he graduated from the Norwegian Military College in 1927 and as a machine engineer from ETH Zurich in 1931. He was hired at Raufoss Ammunisjonsfabrikk in 1935, and became head of department at Kongsberg Våpenfabrikk in 1936. In the same year he was promoted to captain in the military. He also chaired the local rifle association Holmestrand og Omegns SL from 1939 to 1949. From 1932 to 1940 he was also an aide-de-camp for Crown Prince Olav of Norway. During the occupation of Norway by Nazi Germany Ramm was incarcerated at the Grini concentration camp from January to December 1942, among the so-called "King's hostages". He was further arrested in August 1943, along with 1,100 other Norwegian military officers who were sent to prisons in Germany (Schildberg and Luckenwalde) where they were held as prisoners-of-war until the end of the war.

In 1939 he was hired as chief engineer in Nordisk Aluminiumindustri in Holmestrand. He directed the factory in Holmestrand from 1945, and from 1954 he became sales director in the head office in Oslo. From 1959 to 1967 he was the chief executive officer.

In the employers' associations, Ramm was a board member of Mekaniske Verksteders Landsforening from 1947 to 1954 and chaired its county branch in Vestfold from 1951 to 1954; was the vice chairman of Jern- og Metallvarefabrikantenes Landsforening from 1951 to 1954; was a board member of the Federation of Norwegian Industries from 1962 and working committee member from 1963 to 1967.

In other businesses and organizations, he chaired the board of Norsk Jernverk from 1967 to 1972 and Industrivernet from 1967 (board member since 1959), and the supervisory council of Norsk Elektrisk & Brown Boveri from 1971 (member since 1964). He was also a board member of Studieselskapet for Norsk Industri from 1955 to 1960, Det norske Nitridselskap from 1967 and Forsikringsselskapet Norden from 1968, a supervisory council member of the Norwegian America Line from 1965, Tyssefaldene from 1967 and Årdal-Sunndal Verk, and a council member of Norges Forsvarsforening from 1963.

He was decorated as a Knight, First Class of the Order of St. Olav (1939) and a Knight of the Order of the Dannebrog. He died on 22 April 1974 and was buried at Vestre gravlund.
