= Haugenstua Station =

Railway station in Oslo, Norway

Haugenstua
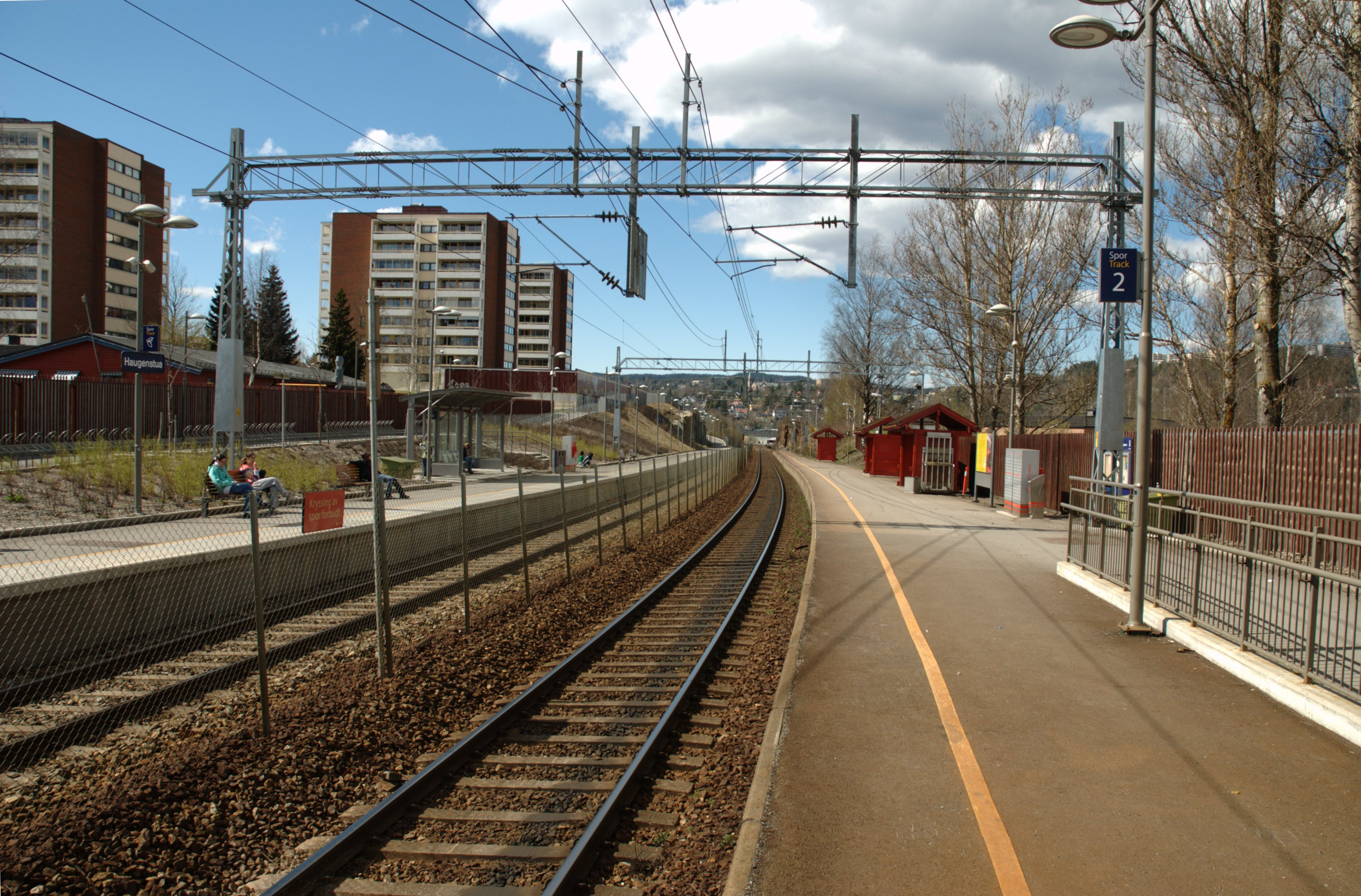

General information
- Location: Haugenstuveien; Haugenstua, Oslo; Norway
- Coordinates: 59°57′5″N 10°54′31″E
- Owner: Bane NOR
- Operator: Vy
- Line: Trunk Line
- Distance: 12.09 km (7.51 mi) from Oslo S
- Platforms: 2

Other information
- Fare zone: 1

History
- Opened: 1 December 1937
- Rebuilt: 21 August 2007

Passengers
- 2007: 3,200 (daily); 1 million (annually)
Location
- Location within Akershus

Haugenstua Station (Norwegian: Haugenstua holdeplass) is a railway station on the Trunk Line located in the Haugenstua neighborhood of Oslo, Norway. Situated 12.09 kilometers (7.51 mi) from Oslo Central Station, it consists of two side platforms along a double tracked line and a disused station building. Haugenstua is served by the L1 line of the Oslo Commuter Rail. The station was opened on 1 December 1937 and received a major renovation in 2007. It has about 3,200 daily passengers.

== History ==
The Trunk Line past Haugenstua opened on 1 September 1854 and residents were served by Grorud Station, some 1,590 meters (5,220 ft) to the southwest. The somewhat closer Høybråten Station opened on 20 October 1921. During the construction of a line the railway company built a navvy house at Høybråten. With the opening of the line, this was moved and converted to a house for the gatekeeper for the level crossing at Haugenstua. When the line was doubled in 1903, the road was placed in an underpass and the gatekeeper's house fell out of use. The line past Haugenstua received double track in 1903 and was electrified in 1927. At one place, during the steam train era, the steep gradient of the line through a curve gave the trains sufficiently slow speed that daring passengers could attempt to board it by jumping on. The line was electrified in 1927.

Haugenstua received a station on 1 December 1937. However, it never received any station building, nor did it ever have a passing loop. Originally the station was served by eighteen northbound and fifteen southbound trains per day. Patronage grew rapidly from the 1970s, as a large-scale residential development project commenced in 1967. Ticket sales were introduced in 1991, but terminated shortly afterwards.

Locals demanded during the 1990s that the station be upgraded. They main concern was that the northern platform was wooden and in poor shape, and a safety hazard as it would be slippery when wet. Grants for the upgrade were initially issued in 2001, but in the last minute reallocated to Skøyen Station. In 2005 money was again put aside, but with only one tender the Norwegian National Rail Administration had to postpone the work. Construction commenced on 22 September 2006. The upgrade also included a new underpass under the tracks at the station, which acts as part of a continuous recreational path from Lillomarka to the Oslofjord. The project cost 32 million Norwegian krone and was opened on 21 August 2007. Real time traffic information systems for the public were installed in 2010.

== Facilities ==
Haugenstua Station is situated 12.09 kilometers (7.51 mi) from Oslo Central Station, during the last segment of the Trunk Line where it is still climbing up Groruddalen. The line past Haugenstua is double track and electrified. There are no passing loops at Haugenstua. The station features two side platforms with sheds. Both are 220 meters (720 ft) long; track 1 is 75 centimeters (30 in) tall while track 2 is 70 centimeters (28 in) tall. There are 24 parking spaces at the station, a bicycle shed and tickets and snacks vending machine.

== Service ==
Vy serves Haugenstua with line L1 of the Oslo Commuter Rail. L1 calls at all stations, running from Lillestrøm Station along the Trunk Line past Haugenstua to Oslo Central Station and then along the Drammen Line to Asker Station before serving the Spikkestad Line and terminating at Spikkestad Station. Haugenstua has two trains per direction per hour with additional trains during rush hour, which is scheduled to increase to four in late 2014. Travel time is 14 minutes to Oslo Central Station and 15 minutes to Lillestrøm. Haugenstua has about 3,200 passengers each day, one million passengers per year, making it amongst the busiest stations in the country.

== Bibliography ==
- Bjerke, Thor; Holom, Finn (2004). Banedata 2004 (in Norwegian). Hamar / Oslo: Norsk Jernbanemuseum / Norsk Jernbaneklubb. ISBN 82-90286-28-7.
- Torbo, Leif Erik (1996). "Höide o. h. 154,6 m". In Mona Larsen-Asp (ed.). Lenge det gikk før Høybråten fikk... (in Norwegian). Oslo: Høybråten Velforening. pp. 96–103.

Preceding station			Following station
Grorud	Trunk Line		Høybråten
Preceding station	Local trains		Following station
Grorud	L1	Spikkestad–Oslo S–Lillestrøm	Høybråten
