= Fjellhamar Station =

Railway station in Lørenskog, Norway

Coordinates: 59°56′27″N 10°58′54″E

Fjellhamar
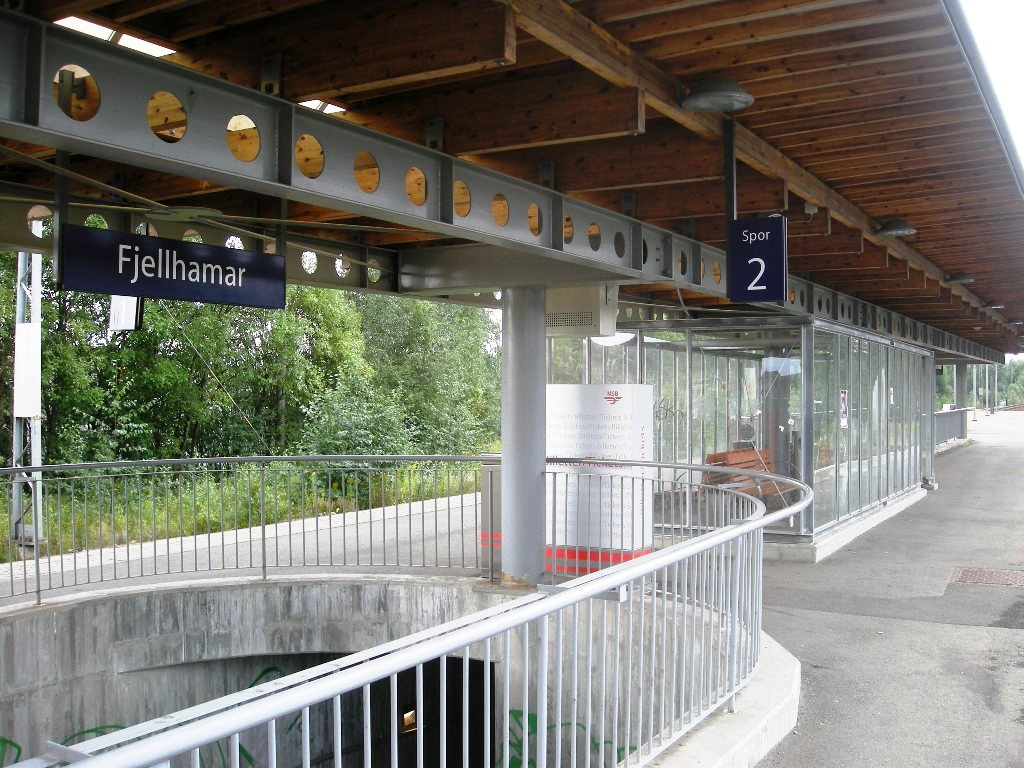

General information
- Location: Fjellhamar, Lørenskog; Norway
- Elevation: 159.5 m (523 ft)
- Owner: Bane NOR
- Operator: Vy
- Line: Trunk
- Distance: 16.42 km (10.20 mi)
- Platforms: 2

History
- Opened: 1956
Location
- Location within Akershus

Fjellhamar is a railway station on the Trunk Line in Lørenskog, Norway. It is served by the Oslo Commuter Rail line L1 operated by Vy running from Lillestrøm via Oslo S to Spikkestad. The station was opened in 1931, but the current station was built from scratch in 2003.

Preceding station			Following station
Hanaborg	Trunk Line		Strømmen
Preceding station	Local trains		Following station
Hanaborg	L1	Spikkestad–Oslo S–Lillestrøm	Strømmen
