= Høybråten Church =

- Høybråten kirke
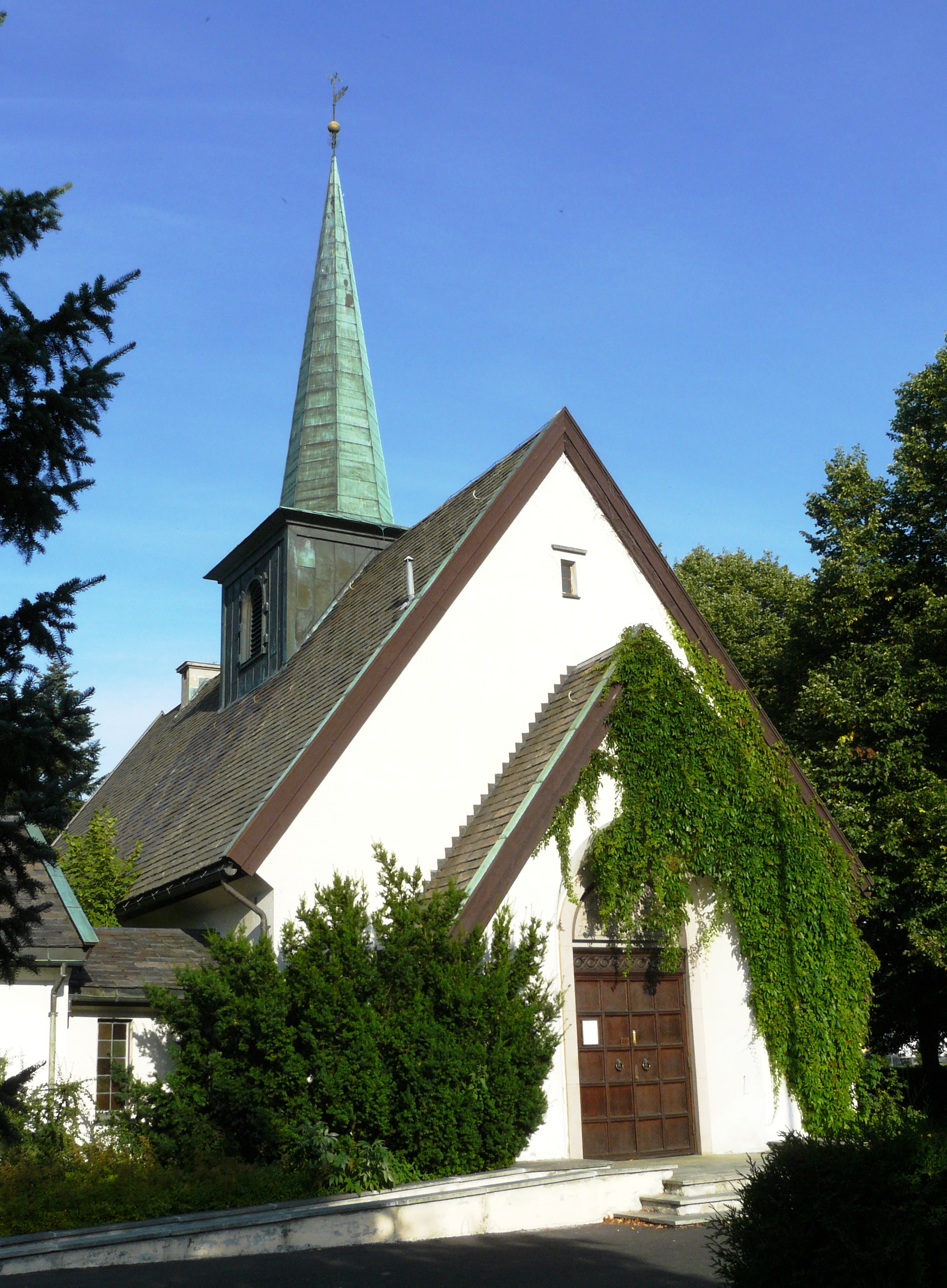
- Høybråten Church
- 59°56′39.527″N 10°54′33.46″E
- Location: Høybråten; Grorud Valley; Oslo,
- Country: Norway
- Denomination: Church of Norway
- Churchmanship: Evangelical Lutheran
- Website: https://kirken.no

History
- Status: Parish church
- Consecrated: 1932

Architecture
- Functional status: Active
- Architect: Georg Greve

Specifications
- Capacity: 168
- Materials: Brick / cement

Administration
- Diocese: Diocese of Oslo
- Deanery: Østre Aker
- Parish: Høybråten, Fossum og Stovner

Høybråten Church (Norwegian: Høybråten kirke) is a church dating from 1932 in Oslo, Norway. It was originally a burial chapel at a cemetery which was consecrated in 1929. However, the church was later rebuilt in 1932, and in 1966 it attained the status of a parish church. One of the largest cemeteries in Oslo still surrounds the church.

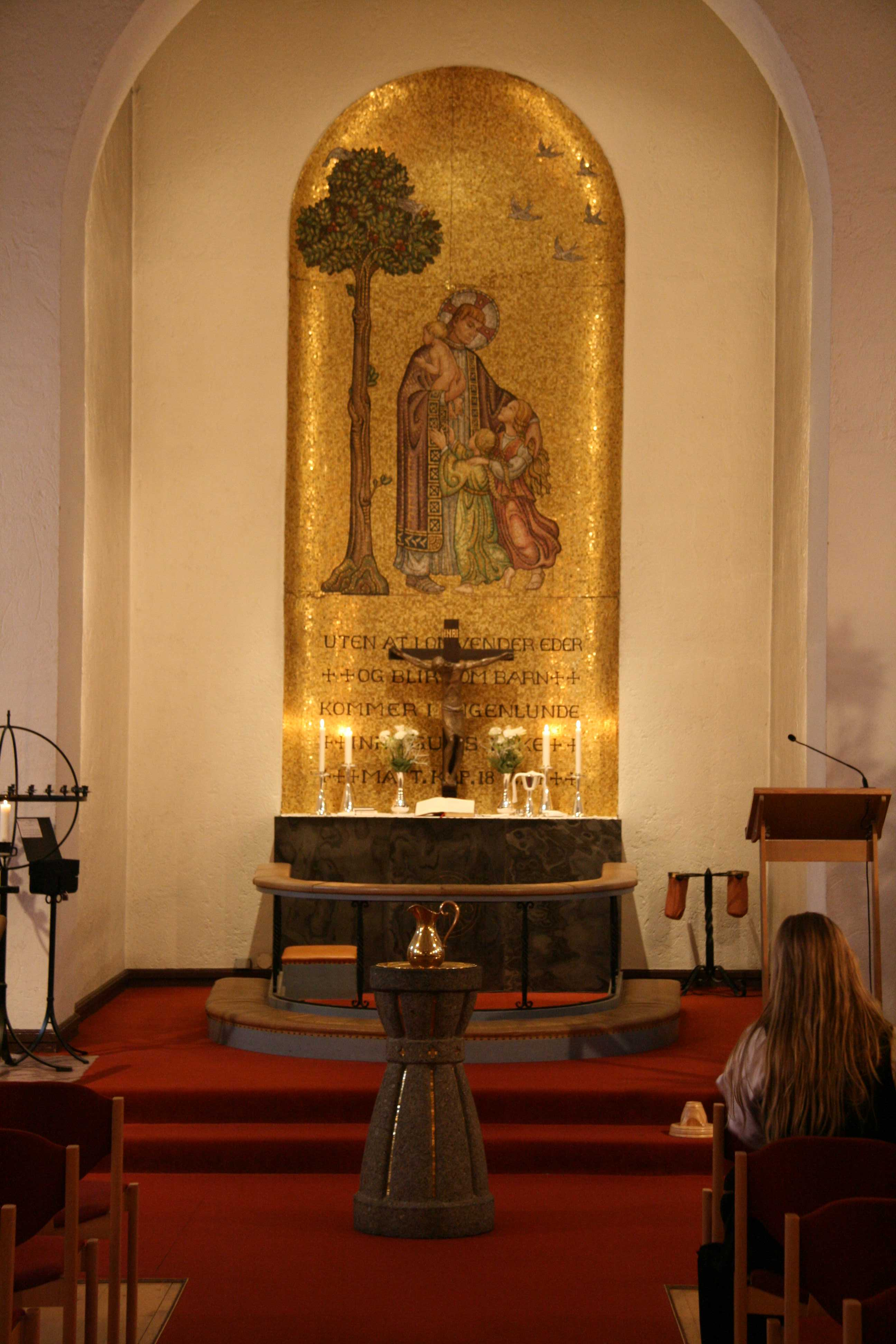
The altar and the altarpiece

The bell tower is located in the middle of the ridge turret. The church bells are produced by Olsen Nauen bell foundry in Tønsberg. The altarpiece is a mosaic that was created in 1955 by Per Vigeland. The church organ at the organ loft is made by Jørgensens Orgelfabrikk (1974).

By the church is a memorial of local casualties during World War II, created by Dagfinn Hermansen and unveiled in 1947.

Høybråten Parish House was built near the church, and was finished before Christmas 2002.

Høybråten Church is a heritage site and is registered in the Cultural Heritage monument data base of Norway.
