= Strømmen Station =

Railway station in Skedsmo, Norway

Strømmen
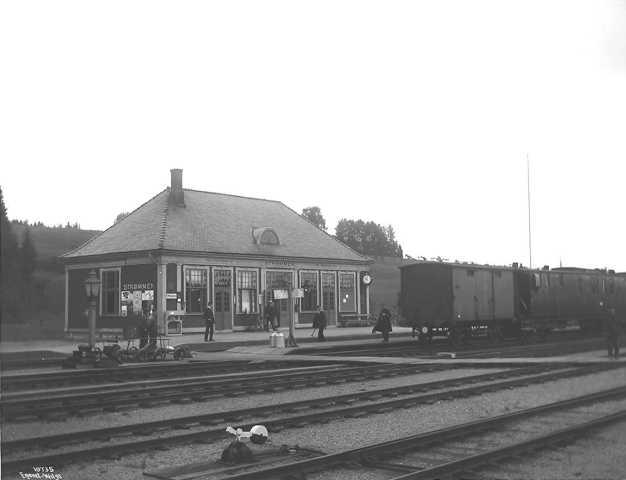
- The station in 1909

General information
- Location: Strømmen, Skedsmo; Norway
- Coordinates: 59°57′1″N 11°0′9″E
- Elevation: 150 m (490 ft)
- Owner: Bane NOR
- Operator: Vy
- Line: Trunk Line
- Distance: 17.93 km (11.14 mi)
- Platforms: 2

History
- Opened: 1956
Location
- Location within Akershus

Strømmen Station (Norwegian: Strømmen stasjon) is a railway station on the Trunk Line in Skedsmo, Norway. It is served by the Oslo Commuter Rail line L1 operated by Vy running from Lillestrøm via Oslo S to Spikkestad. The station was opened in 1854 along with the rest of the Trunk Line.

The station is located beside the former railway factory Strømmens Værksted.

Preceding station			Following station
Fjellhamar	Trunk Line		Sagdalen
Preceding station	Local trains		Following station
Fjellhamar	L1	Spikkestad–Oslo S–Lillestrøm	Sagdalen
