= Hanaborg Station =

Railway station in Lørenskog, Norway

Hanaborg
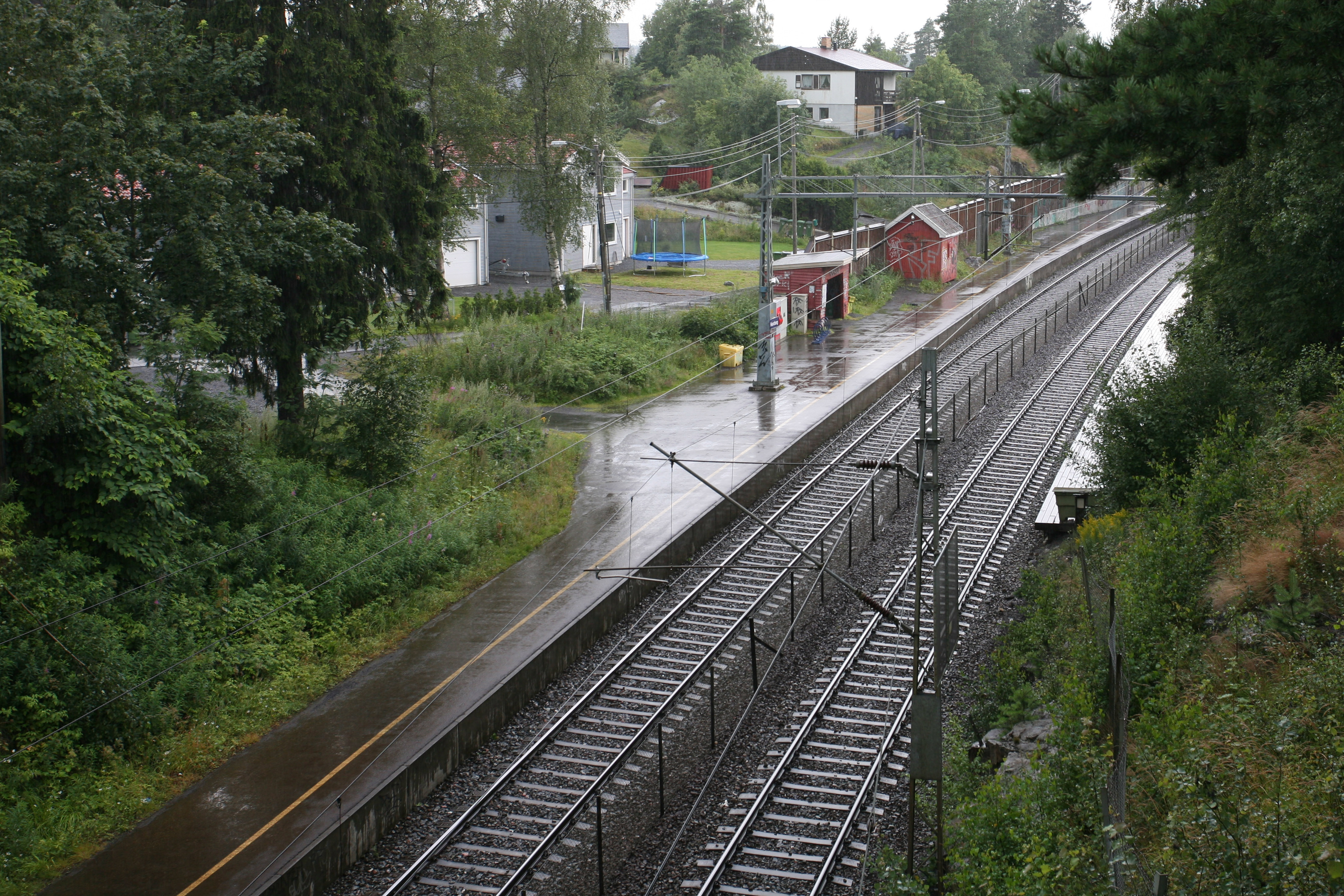

General information
- Location: Hanaborg, Lørenskog; Norway
- Coordinates: 59°56′20″N 10°57′58″E
- Elevation: 172 m (564 ft)
- Owner: Bane NOR
- Operator: Vy
- Line: Trunk Line
- Distance: 15.50 km (9.63 mi)
- Platforms: 2

History
- Opened: 1956
Location
- Location within Akershus

Hanaborg Station (Norwegian: Hanaborg stasjon) is a railway station on the Trunk Line in Lørenskog, Norway. It is served by the Oslo Commuter Rail line L1 operated by Vy running from Lillestrøm via Oslo S to Spikkestad. The station was opened in 1956, the same year the line was electrified.

Preceding station			Following station
Lørenskog	Trunk Line		Fjellhamar
Preceding station	Local trains		Following station
Lørenskog	L1	Spikkestad–Oslo S–Lillestrøm	Fjellhamar
