= Gerhard C. Kallevig =

Norwegian businessman (1880–1964)

Gerhard Charles Kallevig
- Born: 27 July 1880
- Died: 9 August 1964 (aged 84)
- Occupation: Businessman
- Organizations: Automobil-Compagniet; Aurora Auto Co.

Gerhard Charles Kallevig (27 July 1880 – 9 August 1964) was a Norwegian businessman in transport and insurance.

== Personal life ==
He was born in Kristiania as a son of director August Kallevig (1851–1924) and Wenche von der Lippe Mowinckel (1857–1939). He was a brother of Arthur and Waldemar Kallevig. On the maternal side he was a great-grandson of Bishop Jacob von der Lippe and a first cousin once removed of Gerhard Gran. His sister Kirsten Antoinette married Christian Wisbech, and his niece Amélie married Nils Ramm. Gerhard Kallevig was himself married to Vera Tschudi, a daughter of Anton Tschudi.

== Career ==
Gerhard C. Kallevig took commercial education in London and Hamburg, stayed in Fredrikstad and Northern Sweden and also worked in Germany for one year before starting his own trade firm in 1900. The firm traded in wine and timber, and sold marine insurance. He was a business partner with J. Mølbach-Thellefsen from 1906 to 1907. He then started the companies Automobil-Compagniet in 1908 and Aurora Auto Co. in 1911, and was a pioneer in establishing bus routes in Norway. He established the routes Oslo–Hønefoss, Fagernes–Lærdal, Stalheim–Voss–Eide and Elverum–Trysil. He was reportedly the fifteenth person to get a driver's license in Norway, and the first to cross the Dovrefjell mountain range by car.

He sold Aurora in 1931. In 1911 he also established the insurance company Forsikringsselskabet Viking, and worked as chief executive officer. In 1926 the company acquired Norsk Reassuranceselskab and Forsikringsselskapet Minerva, and Kallevig later bought a majority in Kredittinstituttet. In 1956 he retired as chief executive of Viking. He continued as chairman of the supervisory council until 1961.

He was a founding member of the gentlemen's skiing club SK Fram in 1889, of which he received lifetime membership in 1961. He was also a member of the exclusive Det Norske Selskab and Christiania Jægerklub av 1873 clubs. He died on 9 August 1964.
