= Lindeberg (station) =

Oslo metro station

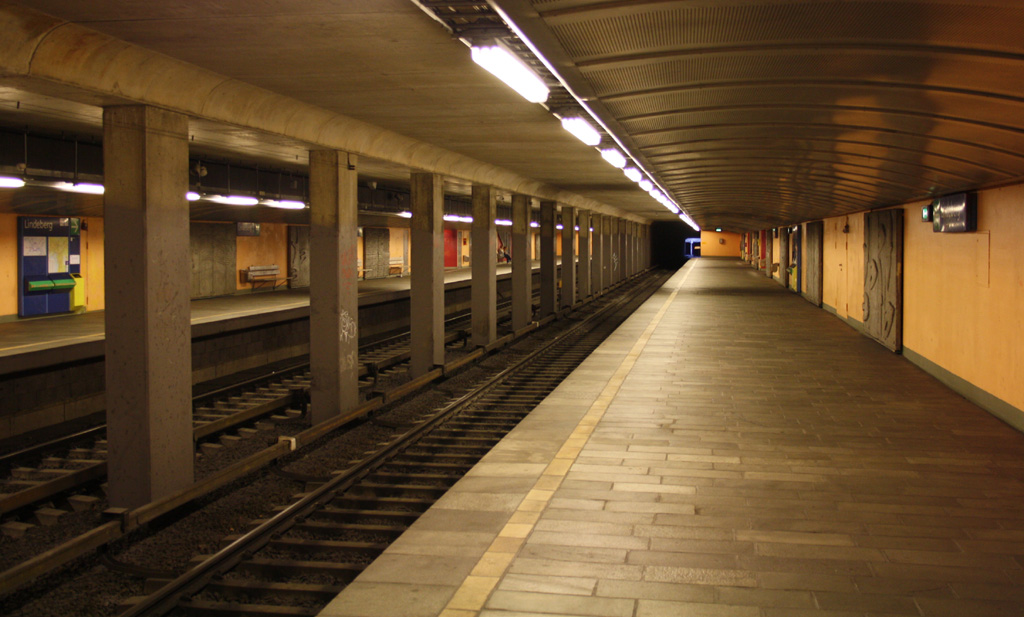

General information
- Location: Lindeberg, Oslo; Norway
- Coordinates: 59°55′58″N 10°52′55″E
- Elevation: 156.5 m (513 ft)
- Owner: Sporveien
- Operator: Sporveien T-banen
- Line: Furuset Line
- Distance: 9.5 km (5.9 mi) from Stortinget

Construction
- Structure type: Underground
- Accessible: Yes

History
- Opened: 19 February 1978
Location

Lindeberg is an Oslo Metro station on the Furuset Line (line 2) between Trosterud and Furuset. The station was opened on 19 February 1978 with the opening of the Trosterud-Furuset stretch of the line. The station is located underground. The area is residential, but there is also a small hill for downhill skiing, Jerikobakken, in the vicinity.

The task of decorating the walls was assigned to Gunnar Torvund in 1976 with a series of 14 rectangular concrete reliefs, aimed at giving the station a mild and soothing appearance. In 1990 a school class was given the job of painting the station with several graffiti-like and very bright images, much to the astonishment of Torvund as well as other artists and art historians who considered the new colors to be public vandalism. In 1999, the subway company relented, restoring much of the plain gray color.

Preceding station	Oslo Metro	Following station
Trosterud towards Østerås	Line 2	Furuset towards Ellingsrudåsen
