= Trosterud (station) =

Oslo metro station

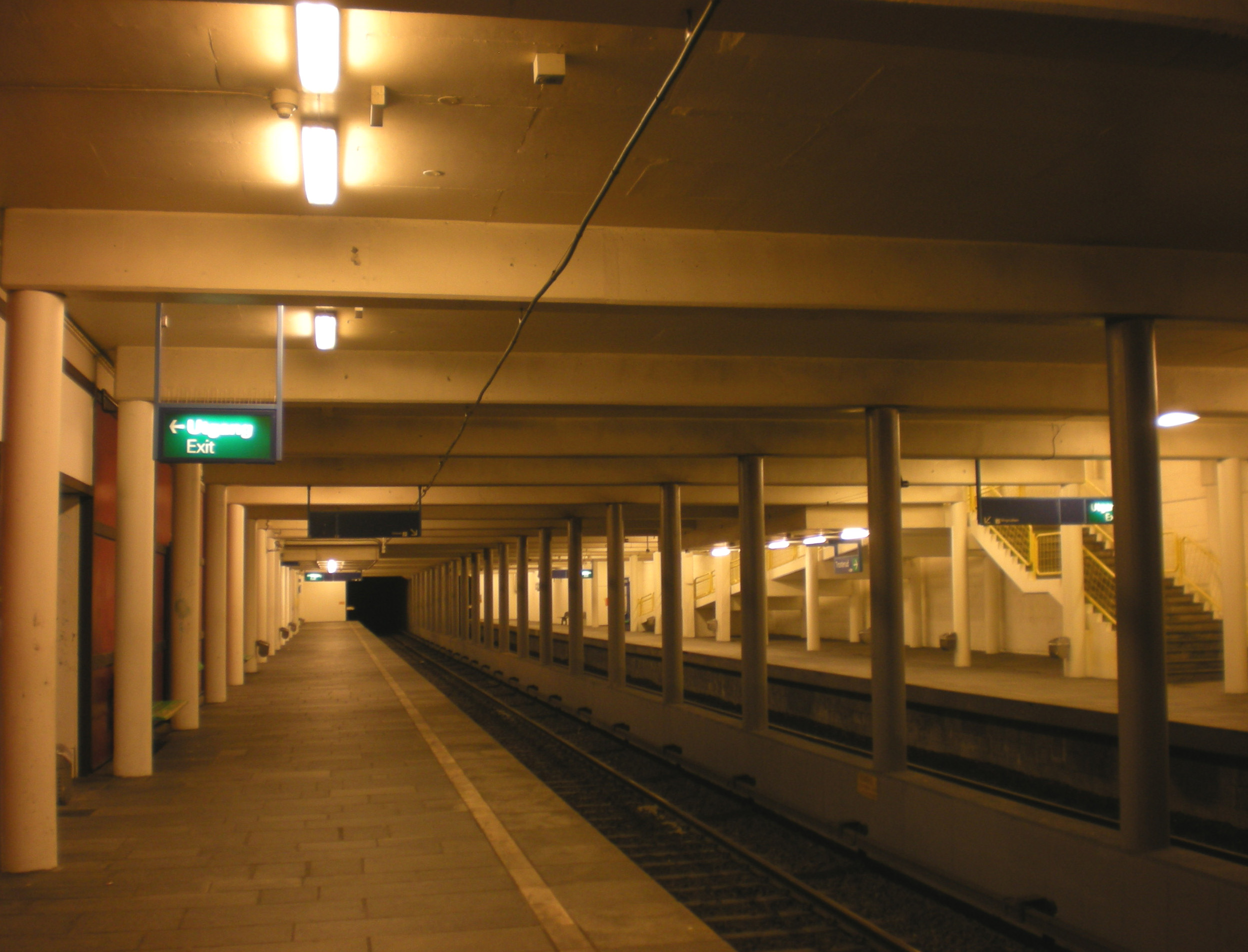
- Photo: Tommeh72

General information
- Location: Alna, Oslo; Norway
- Coordinates: 59°55′36″N 10°51′49″E
- Owner: Sporveien
- Operator: Sporveien T-banen
- Line: Furuset Line
- Distance: 8.4 km (5.2 mi) from Stortinget

Construction
- Structure type: Underground
- Accessible: Yes

History
- Opened: 15 December 1974
Location

Trosterud is a station on Furusetbanen (line 2 of Oslo T-Bane) in the Alna borough of Oslo between Haugerud and Lindeberg, 8.4 km from Stortinget. The station is located aboveground, but is inside the Trosterud shopping centre, and not an open-air station. It is located in a largely residential area with several apartment buildings.

The station was opened on 15 December 1974 and was the end station until 19 February 1978. Formerly, Trosterud was one of the more blighted and unattractive stations in the east. Renovation of the station by adding artwork to the station area was completed 23 October 2004. The artistic work was partly done by the Trosterud youth club, led by artist Adriana Bertet, who also participated in the decoration of the station at Stovner.

Preceding station	Oslo Metro	Following station
Haugerud towards Østerås	Line 2	Lindeberg towards Ellingsrudåsen
