= Sagdalen Station =

Railway station in Skedsmo, Norway

Sagdalen
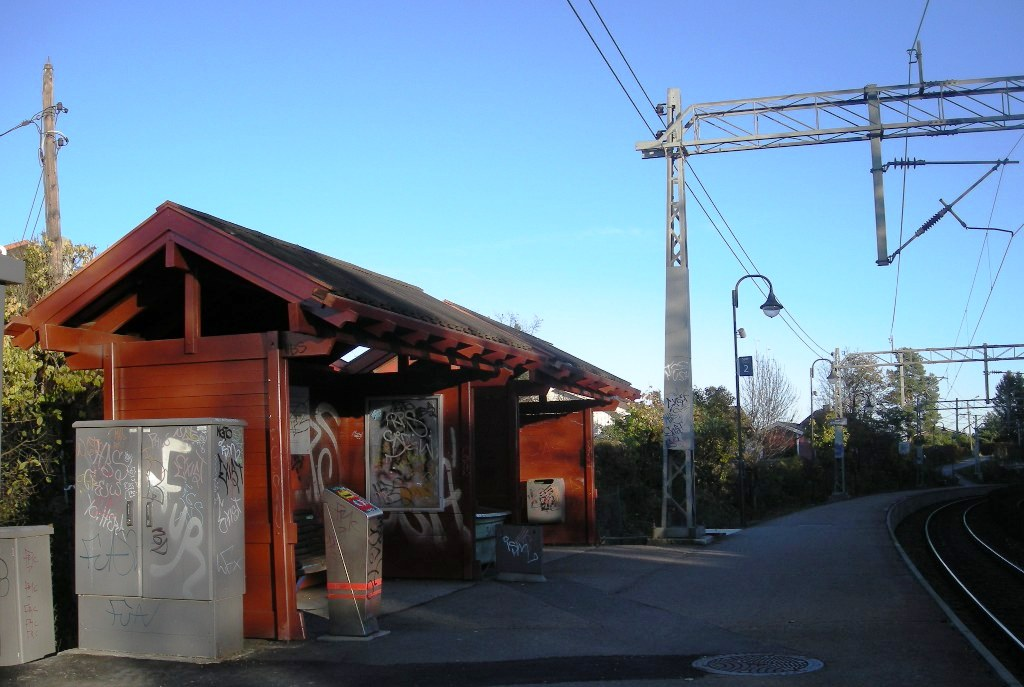

General information
- Location: Strømmen, Skedsmo; Norway
- Coordinates: 59°57′22″N 11°1′0″E
- Elevation: 134 m (440 ft)
- Owner: Bane NOR
- Operator: Vy
- Line: Trunk Line
- Distance: 19.05 km (11.84 mi)
- Platforms: 2

History
- Opened: 1938
Location
- Location within Akershus

Sagdalen Station (Norwegian: Sagdalen stasjon) is a railway station on the Trunk Line in Skedsmo, Norway. It is served by the Oslo Commuter Rail line L1 operated by Vy running from Lillestrøm via Oslo S to Spikkestad. The station was opened in 1938.

The station is located beside the former railway factory Strømmens Værksted.

Preceding station			Following station
Strømmen	Trunk Line		Lillestrøm
Preceding station	Local trains		Following station
Strømmen	L1	Spikkestad–Oslo S–Lillestrøm	Lillestrøm
