= Visperud =

- Village
- Location in Akershus
- Coordinates: 59.931°N 10.936°E
- Country: Norway
- Region: Østlandet
- County: Akershus
- Municipality: Lørenskog
- Time zone: UTC+01:00 (CET)
  - Summer (DST): UTC+02:00 (CEST)

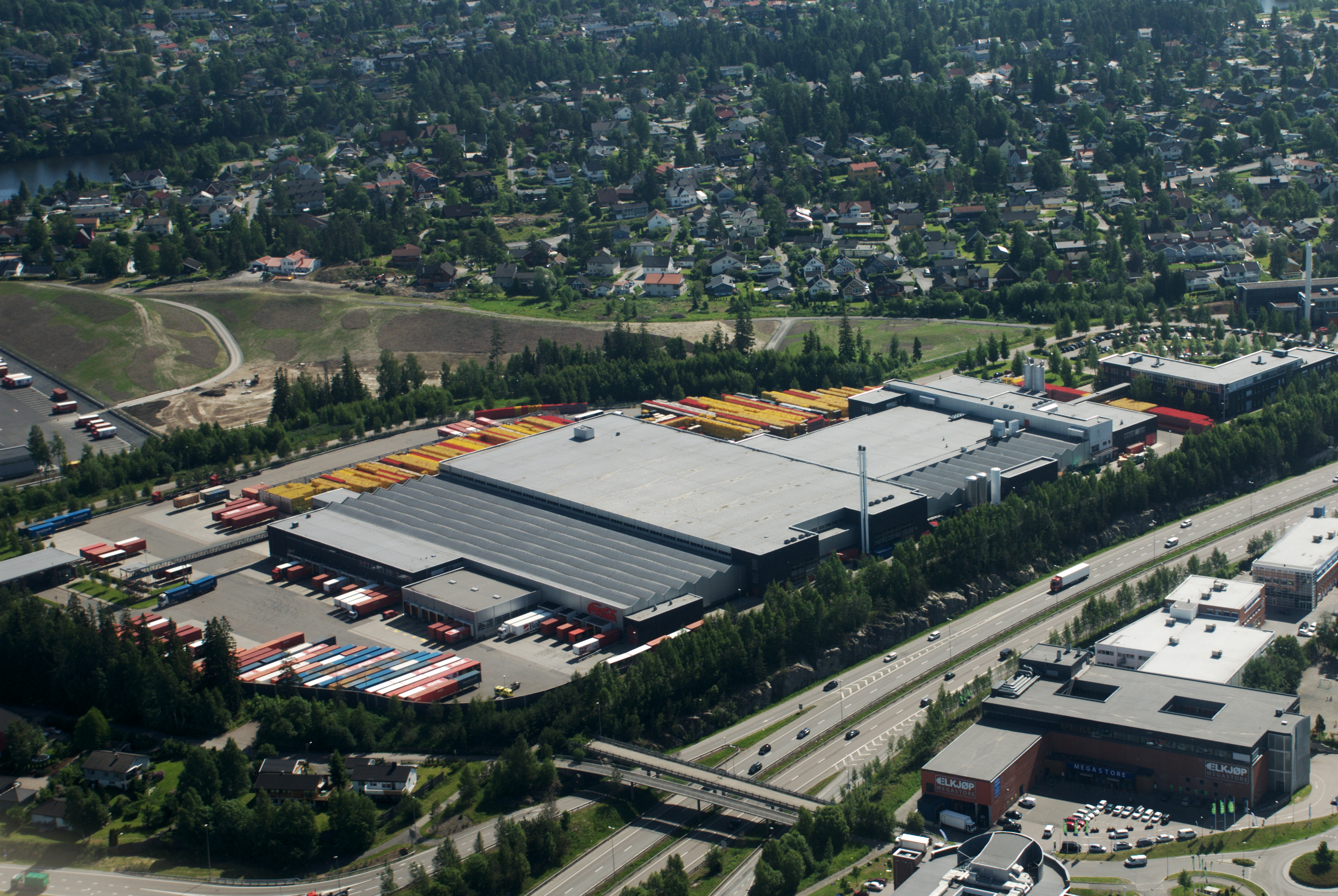
The Coca-Cola Company's plat is located in the northern part Visperud

Visperud is a neighborhood in Lørenskog, Norway, right on the border to Oslo. North of the area, at Robsrud, lays the main facilities for Norway Post and The Coca-Cola Company in Norway. The area is proposed as a future stop should the Furuset Line of the Oslo Metro be extended.
