= Nyland Station =

Railway station in Oslo, Norway

Nyland
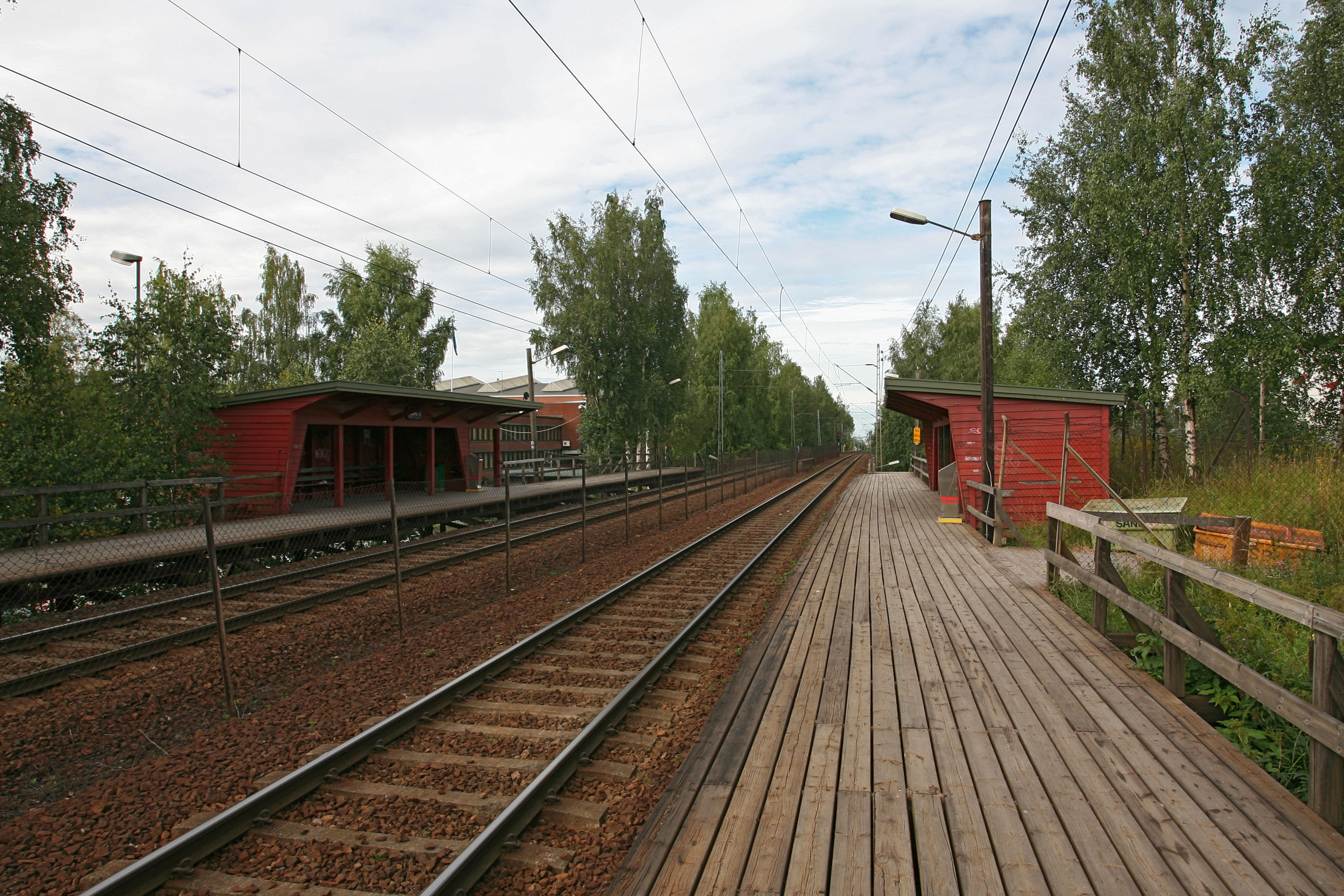

General information
- Location: Grorud, Oslo; Norway
- Coordinates: 59.9443°N 10.8737°E
- Owner: Bane NOR
- Operator: Vy
- Line: Trunk Line
- Distance: 9.30 km (5.78 mi)
- Platforms: 2

Other information
- Fare zone: 1

History
- Opened: 17 June 1961
Location
- Location within Akershus

Nyland Station (Norwegian: Nyland holdeplass) is a railway station on the Trunk Line located in the Grorud borough of Oslo, Norway. Situated 9.30 kilometers (5.78 mi) from Oslo Central Station, it consists of two wooden side platforms along a double-tracked line. Nyland is served by the L1 line of the Oslo Commuter Rail. The station was opened on 17 June 1961, although an unofficial stop had been in place since 1942. It serves a mostly industrial area, including Mantena's rolling stock maintenance base.

== History ==
The Trunk Line past Nyland opened on 1854. The area gradually grew up as an industrial site, with a major match factory established in 1865. The Norwegian State Railways later establish a major depot at Nyland in 1943. To allow workers access, trains on the Trunk Line started calling at Nyland no later than 1942. An official stop was established on 17 June 1961, 400 meters (1,300 ft) north of the older station.

== Facilities ==
Nyland Station is situated 9.30 kilometers (5.78 mi) from Oslo Central Station. The line past Nyland is double track and electrified. The station features two wooden side platforms each with a shed. The platform is 200 meters (660 ft) and 37 centimeters (15 in) tall. The station has a steep ramp to each platform. The station lacks a ticket machine.

== Service ==
Vy serves Nyland with line L1 of the Oslo Commuter Rail. L1 calls at all stations, running from Lillestrøm Station along the Trunk Line past Alna to Oslo Central Station and then along the Drammen Line to Asker Station before serving the Spikkestad Line and terminating at Spikkestad Station. Alna has four trains per direction per hour. Travel time is 10 minutes to Oslo Central Station and 19 minutes to Lillestrøm.

Preceding station			Following station
Alna	Trunk Line		Grorud
Preceding station	Local trains		Following station
Alna	L1	Spikkestad–Oslo S–Lillestrøm	Grorud
