= Lørenskog Station =

Railway station in Lørenskog, Norway

Lørenskog
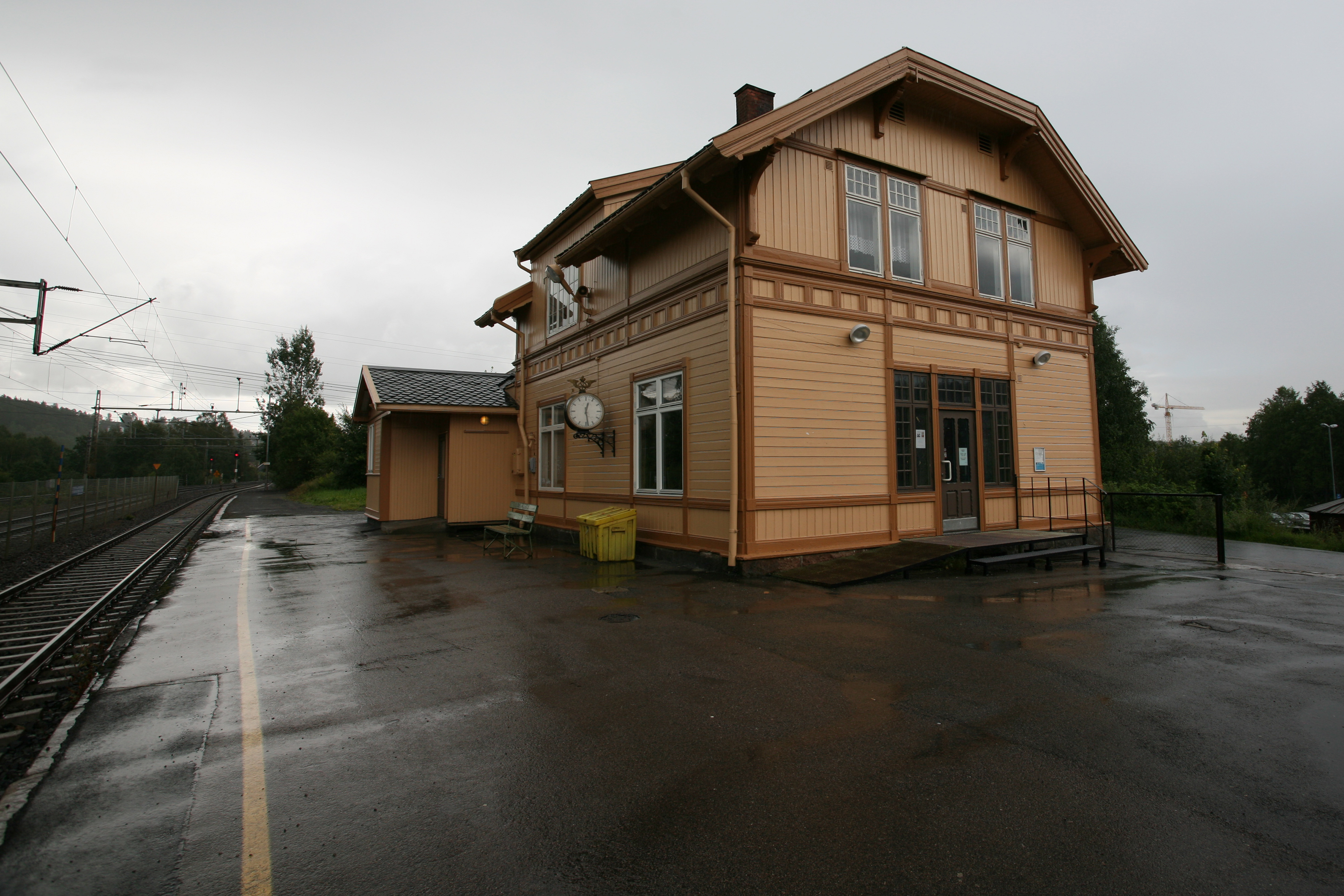

General information
- Location: Lørenskog, Lørenskog; Norway
- Coordinates: 59°56′42″N 10°56′42″E
- Elevation: 159.3 m (523 ft)
- Owner: Bane NOR
- Operator: Vy
- Line: Trunk Line
- Distance: 14.15 km (8.79 mi)
- Platforms: 2

Construction
- Architect: Paul Due

History
- Opened: 1857
Location
- Location within Akershus

Lørenskog is a railway station on the Trunk Line in Lørenskog, Norway. The station itself lies just outside Oslo's city limit, but when it comes to fares, it is included in the price paid for an Oslo-ticket. It is served by the Oslo Commuter Rail line L1 operated by Vy running from Lillestrøm via Oslo S to Spikkestad.

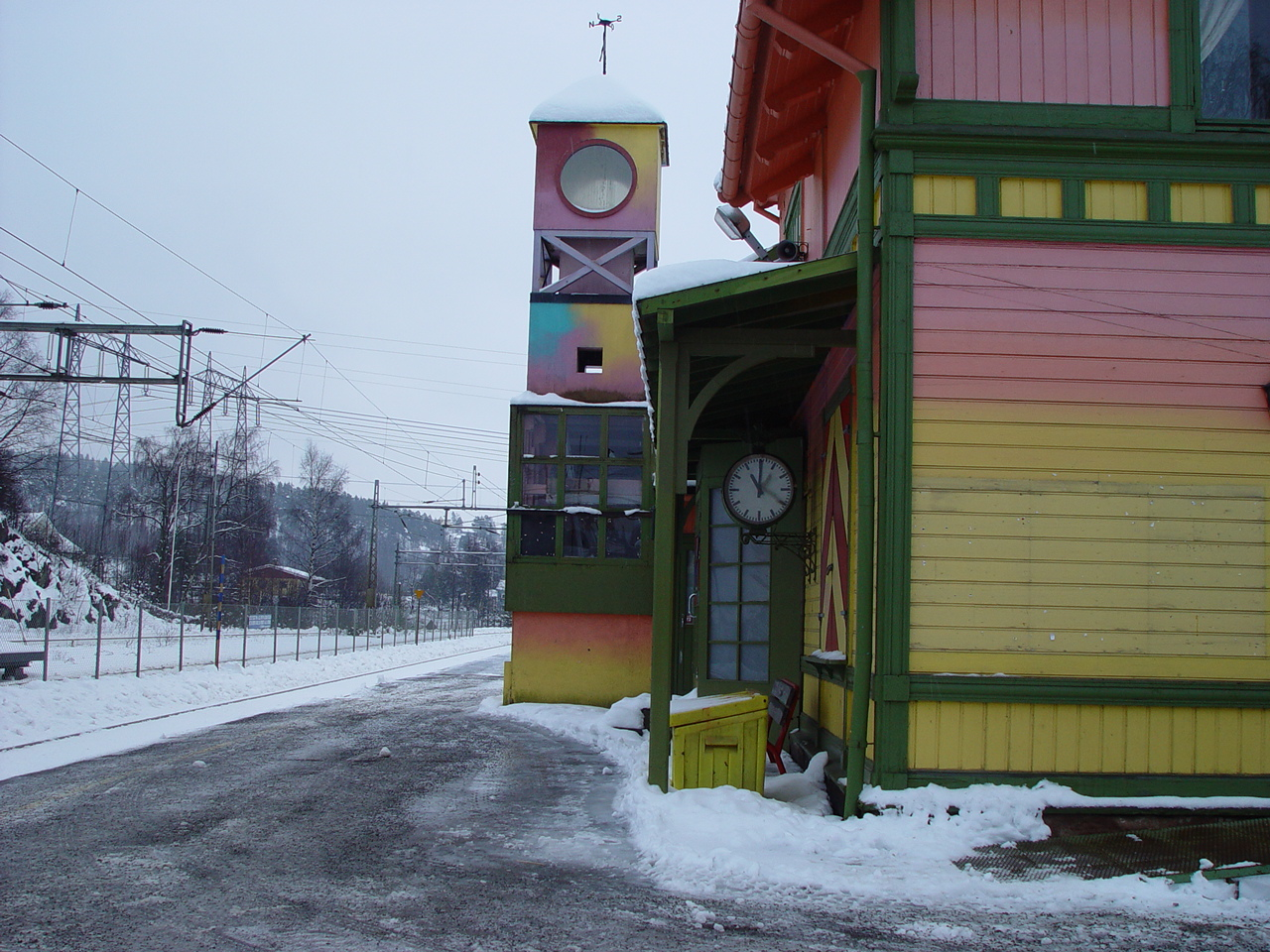
Lørenskog Station in the color scheme as Sesame Station

== History ==
The station was opened in 1857, three years after the railway. It was originally named Robsrud, after the closest farm, to be changed to the current name in 1909, the same year Lørenskog demerged from Skedsmo municipality. It became remote automated from 1972 and freight services terminated in 1988. In 2000 the station became unstaffed. The station building, by Paul Due, was opened in 1901.

== Sesame Station ==
The station building is best known as the facility for filming all outdoor scenes for the popular children's television show Sesam Stasjon that ran on the Norwegian Broadcasting Corporation from 1991 to 1998. Indoor scenes were filmed in studio. The station was until 2006 colorfully decorated in a multitude of colors thematic for the Sesame series. Kindergarten classes could occasionally take the Sesame train from Oslo S to Lørenskog and see the station. In 2003 it was decided to revert the station back to the original color scheme, and completed by spring of 2006.

Preceding station			Following station
Høybråten	Trunk Line		Hanaborg
Preceding station	Local trains		Following station
Høybråten	L1	Spikkestad–Oslo S–Lillestrøm	Hanaborg
