= Høybråten =

- Neighbourhood
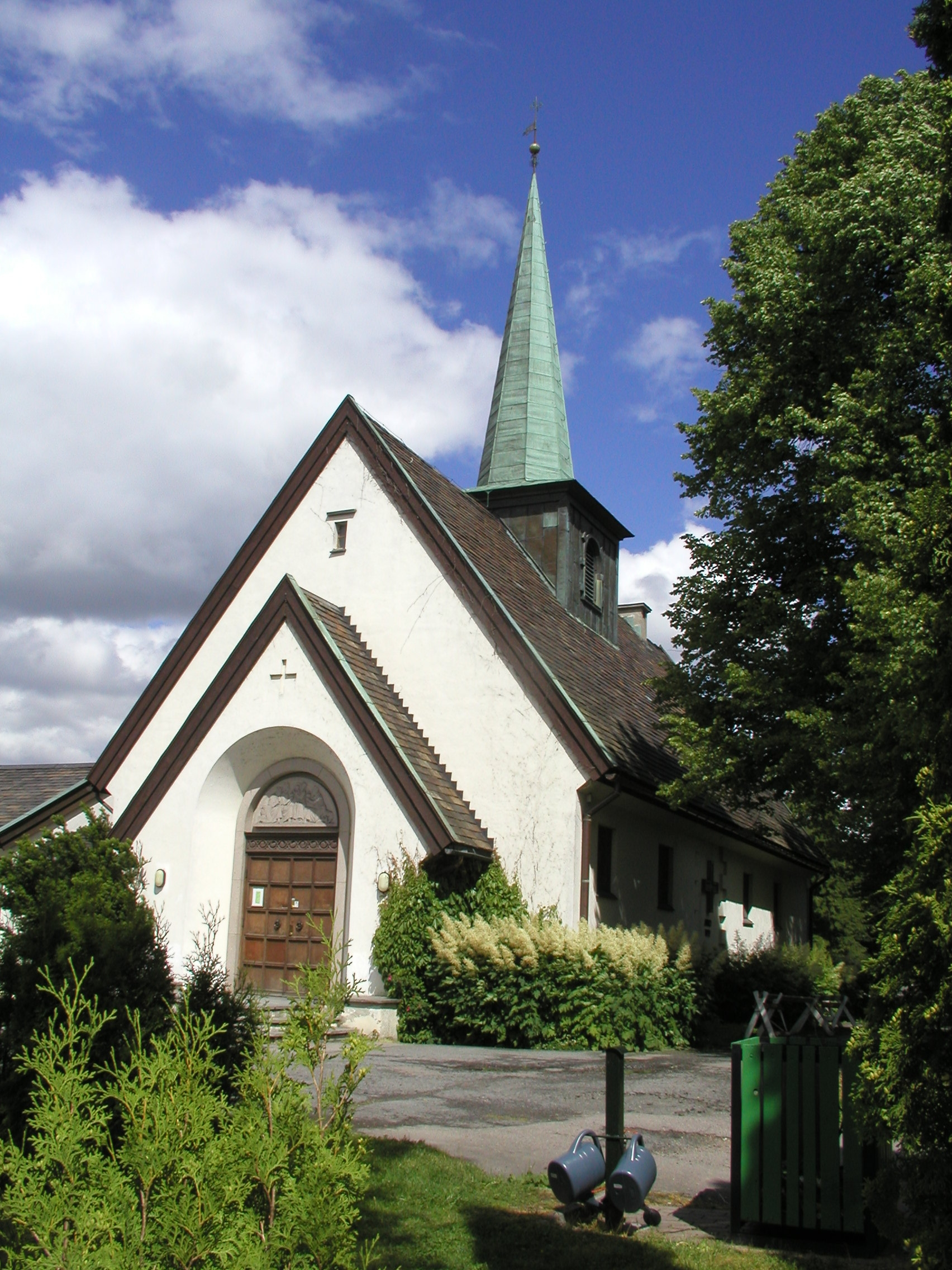
- Høybråten Church

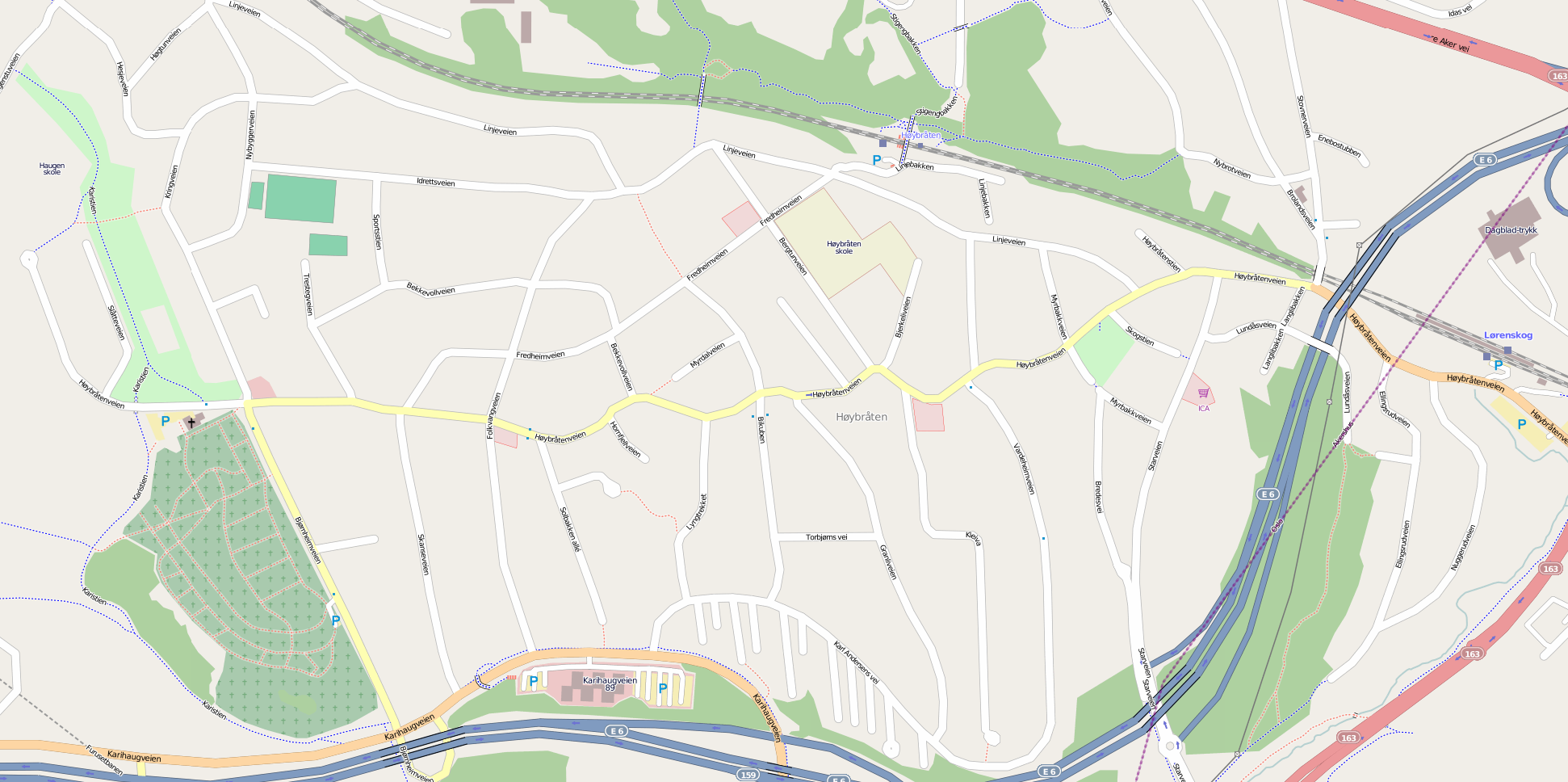
- Map of Høybråten

- Location in Norway
- Coordinates: 59°56′45.8″N 10°54′44.7″E
- Country: Norway
- County: Oslo
- District: Groruddalen
- Municipality: Oslo
- Borough: Stovner
- Time zone: UTC+1 (CET)
  - Summer (DST): UTC+2 (CEST)
- Postal codes: 1084–1088

Location in Oslo

Høybråten is a residential area in the north-eastern part (Stovner bydel) of Norway's capital Oslo. Høybråten has its own church, schools and railway station.

As of 2024, the estimated population is 8076.

== Sports ==
Høybråten Basketball Club (HBBK) won 16 Norwegian woman championships in basketball uninterrupted for 15 years (1981 to 1995), as well as in 1998. It earned them a place in the Guinness Book of Records. Høybråten og Stovner IL (HSIL) took the championship gold in cross-country relay race for women in 2003 and 2007, the first time with Kristin Stormer Steira on the team.

== Noted people related to Høybråten ==
- Thor Gjermund Eriksen, former editor of Dagbladet (2003–06), now Director of Broadcasting in NRK
- Jon Knudsen, soccer keeper who debuted on the national men's team in 2008
- Odd Nordhoug, author and professor at the Norwegian School
- Orji Okoroafor, finalist in Idol (TV program) in 2003, actor and basketball player
- Afshan Rafiq, Right Politician, former MP and former member of the Oslo City Council
