= Grorud Station =

Railway station in Oslo, Norway

Grorud
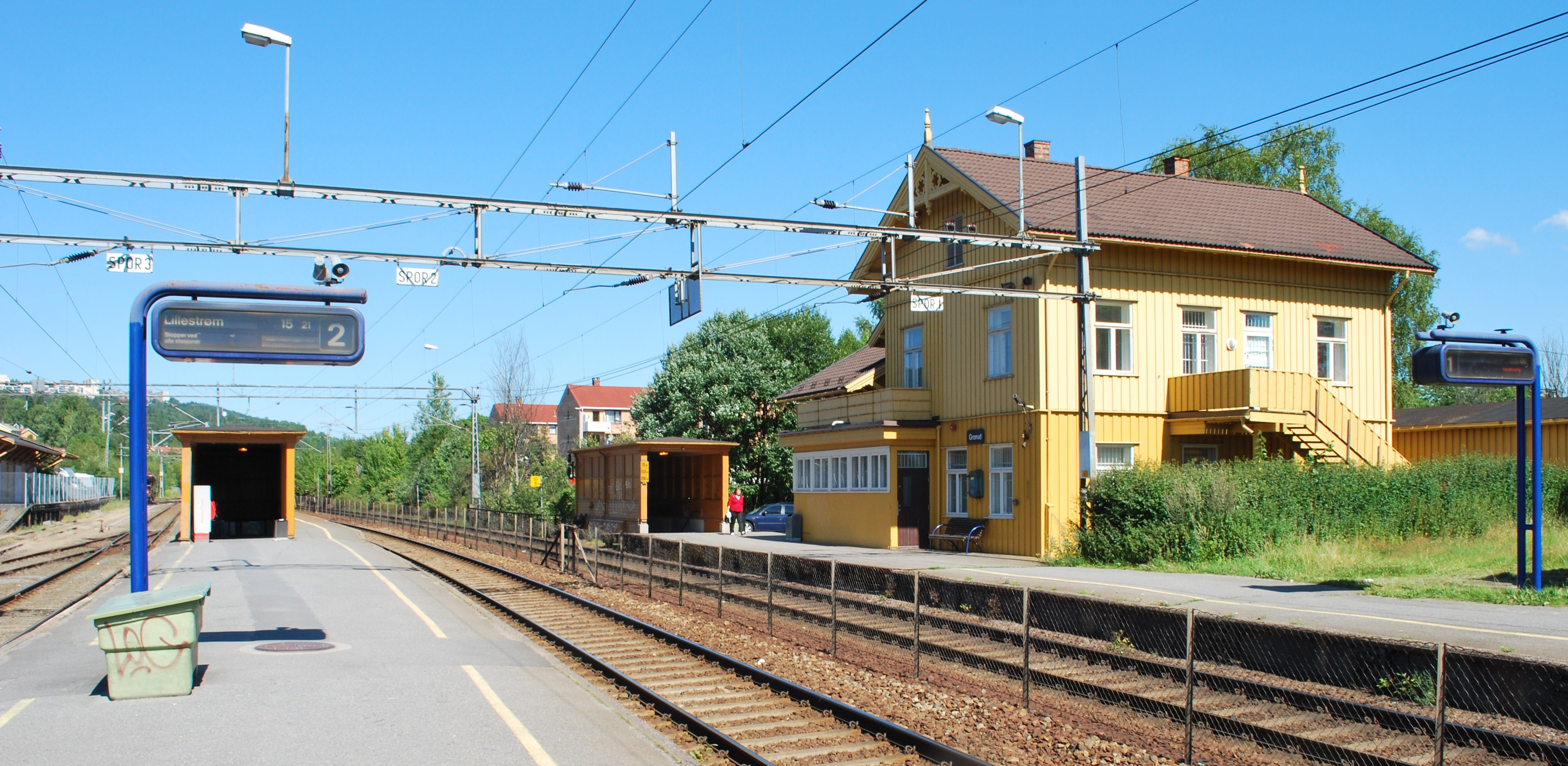

General information
- Location: Grorud, Oslo; Norway
- Coordinates: 59°56′59″N 10°53′15″E
- Elevation: 127.0 m (416.7 ft)
- Owner: Bane NOR
- Operator: Vy
- Line: Trunk Line
- Distance: 10.50 km (6.52 mi)
- Platforms: 2
- Tracks: 3

Construction
- Parking: 80 spaces
- Cycle facilities: Yes
- Architect: Heinrich Ernst Schirmer and Wilhelm von Hanno (1854)

Other information
- Fare zone: 1

History
- Opened: 1 September 1854
- Rebuilt: 1865
Location
- Location within Akershus

Grorud Station (Norwegian: Grorud stasjon) is a railway station on the Trunk Line located in the Grorud borough of Oslo, Norway. Situated 10.50 kilometers (6.52 mi) from Oslo Central Station, it consists of three tracks with a side platforms and an island platform. Grorud is served by the L1 line of the Oslo Commuter Rail.

The station was opened on 1 September 1854 and is one of Norway's nine first stations. The original building, designed by Heinrich Ernst Schirmer and Wilhelm von Hanno, burned down in 1862. It was replaced by the current station in Swiss chalet style, which was completed in 1865.

== History ==
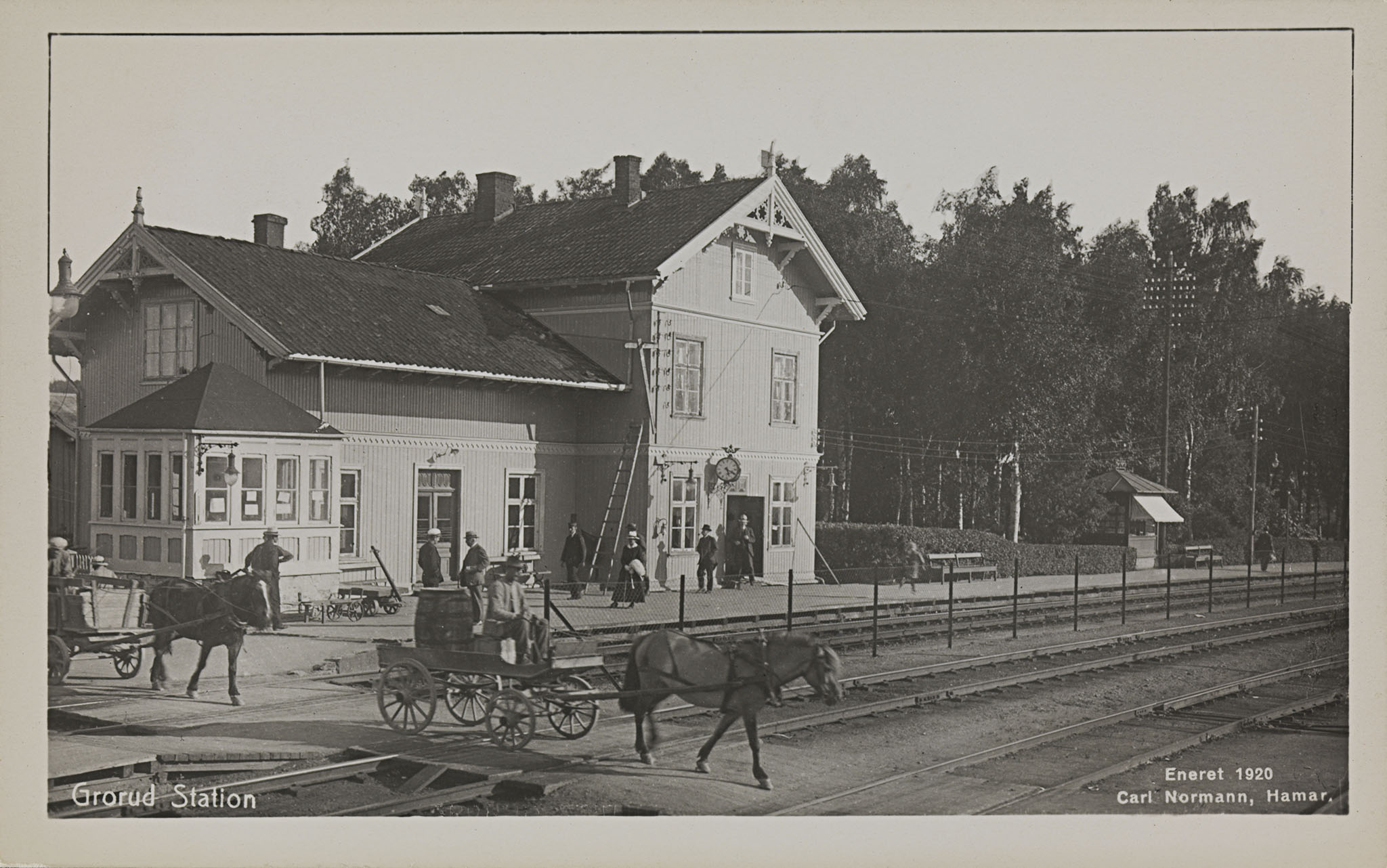
The station ca. 1920

Grorud was selected as one of nine original station which was built for Norway's first railway, the Trunk Line. Grorud was selected both because it was at about half-way between Christiania and Lillestrøm Station, but also because it had many large farms and sawmills in its vicinity. Construction began in 1851. It opened on 1 September 1854, jointly as the oldest railway station in Norway. The station was named for the farm in the area. The original station building was designed by Heinrich Ernst Schirmer and Wilhelm von Hanno, in the same general design as the station at Frogner, Kløften and Dahl.

The station had a major impact on the Grorud area, which at the time was entirely rural. Travel time was forty minutes to Christiania East Station and made transport to the capital easy. The area gradually grew as a population center. The railway line physically divided Groruddalen into two sections, which after the railway line came became known as Grorud and Furuset. Originally the only level crossing of the line between Grorud and Furuset was situated at the station.

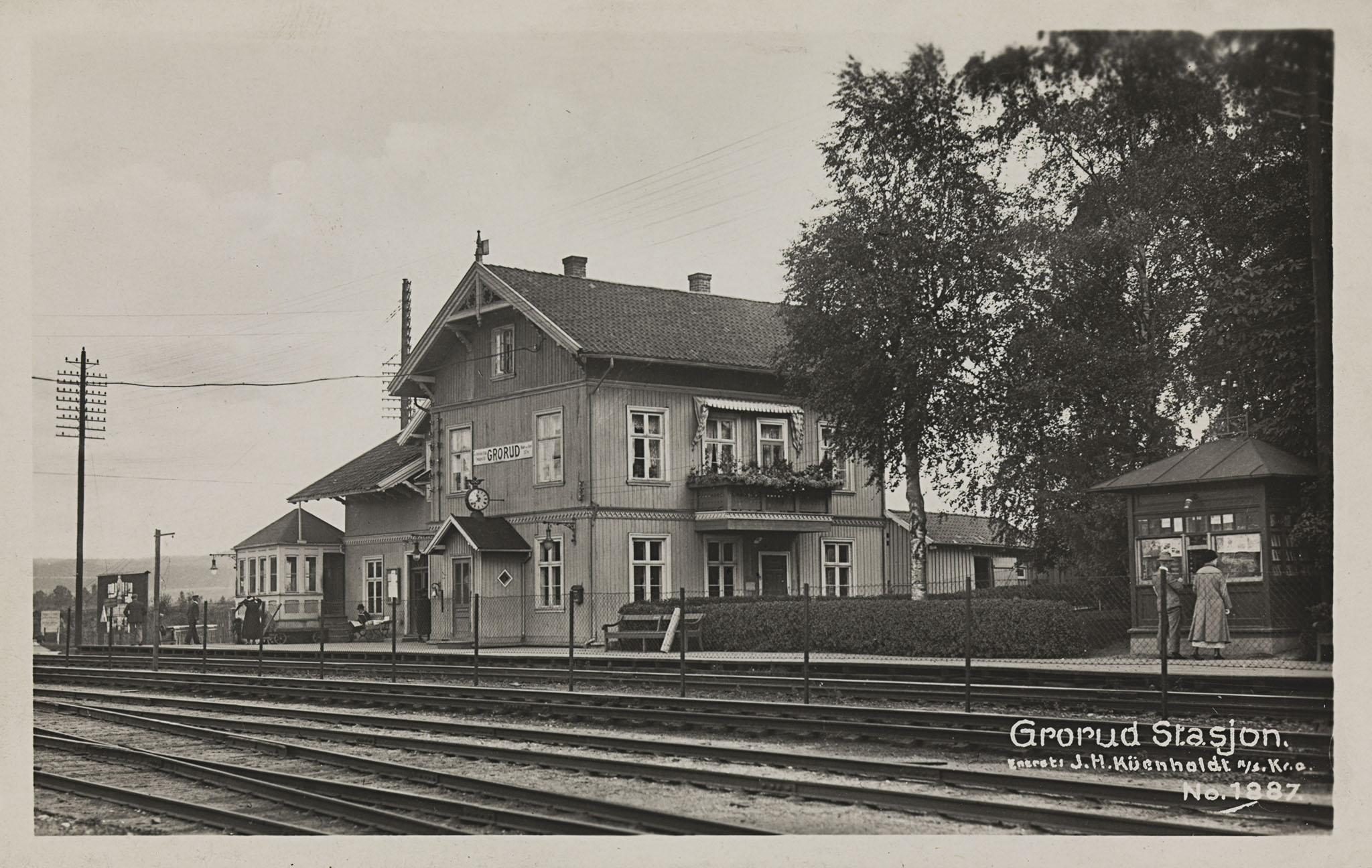
Grorud Station

A fire in 1862 caused the station building to burn down. It was replaced with a new station building in 1865, designed by an unknown architect. It was built on the same foundation and has many structural similarities as the original station. The upper floor served as a station master's residence. There was also a small house nearby for the clerk and park. By 1867 there were 5,287 passengers taking the train that year from Grorud to Christiania. The area could thereafter gradually establish itself as a suburb and industrial area. The station received an extension in the 1890s, followed by gas lamps in 1900 and 1901. An incomplete interlocking system was installed on 1 May 1901. The following years the line between Christiania and Lillestrøm was upgraded to double track, which opened past Grorud on 1 October 1903. Grorud was the only station along the line which, due to the recent upgrades, was large enough that it did not need an expansion.

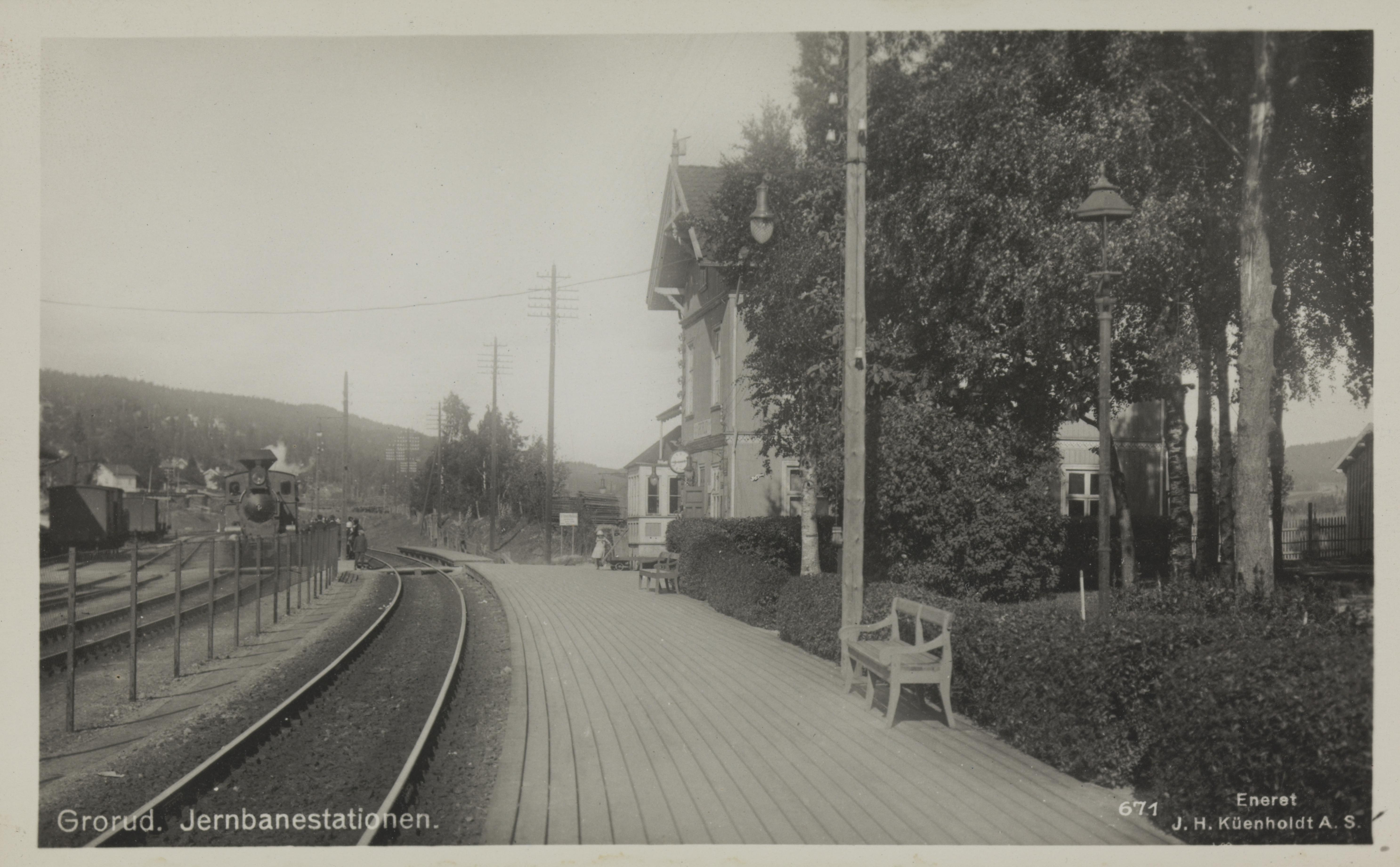
The station and its park

Grorud became a more distinct area around the beginning of the 20th century, with a school and a church. The railway past the station was electrified on 1 September 1927. Grorudveien, the road crossing the tracks, was lowered and the railway placed on a bridge over the road in 1938. The station received a complete interlocking system on 26 March 1939. The most intensive construction of housing started in the 1940s. Grorud Station received centralized traffic control on 24 January 1972, allowing it to be unstaffed starting 2 June 1991.

== Facilities ==
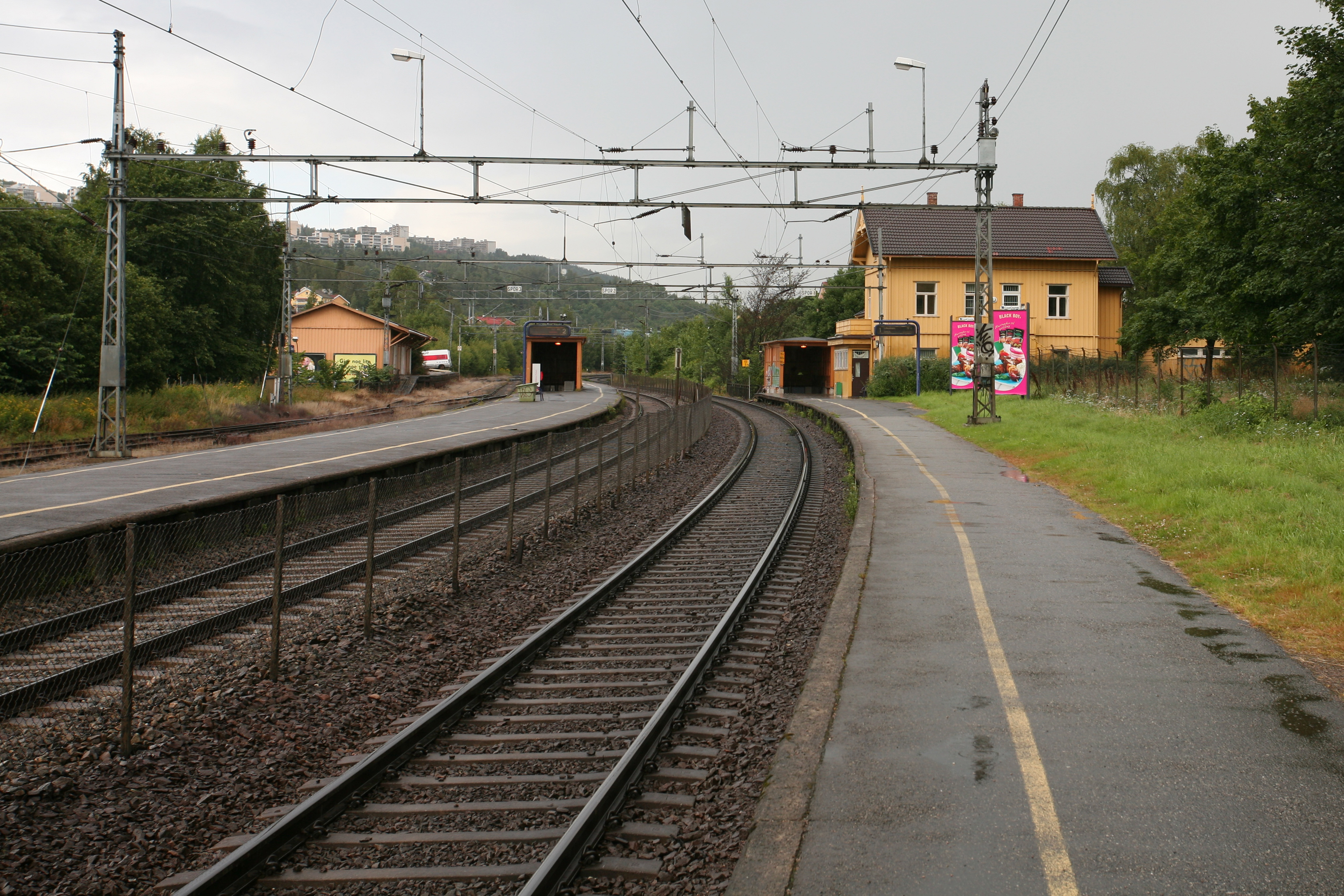
The station area

Grorud Station is situated 10.50 kilometers (6.52 mi) from Oslo Central Station, at an elevation of 127 meters (417 ft) above mean sea level. The wooden station building was built in Swiss chalet style, without any contemporary railway buildings in a similar design. The station building is no longer in use, but has been listed as a cultural heritage.

The line past Grorud is double track and electrified. The station features two platforms serving three tracks. Closest to the station building is a 187-meter (614 ft) long side platform serving track 1, while tracks 2 and 3 are served by a common 215-meter (705 ft) island platform. The platforms have heights of 43 and 68 centimeters (17 and 27 in). Track 3 connects to Alnabru Freight Terminal, so east-bound freight trains from there emerge onto the Trunk Line at Grorud. There is an underpass under the station between the two platforms. It has stairs and is not universally accessible. There is a ticket machine at the station, as well as parking for 80 cars.

== Service ==
Vy serves Grorud with line L1 of the Oslo Commuter Rail. L1 calls at all stations, running from Lillestrøm Station along the Trunk Line past Grorud to Oslo Central Station and then along the Drammen Line to Asker Station before serving the Spikkestad Line and terminating at Spikkestad Station. Grorud has four trains per direction per hour. Travel time is 12 minutes to Oslo Central Station and 17 minutes to Lillestrøm.

== Bibliography ==
- Bjerke, Thor; Holom, Finn (2004). Banedata 2004 (in Norwegian). Hamar / Oslo: Norwegian Railway Museum / Norwegian Railway Club. ISBN 82-90286-28-7.
- Bramness, Guri (1995). Lokalhistorisk vandring på Grorud (in Norwegian). Oslo: Society for the Preservation of Ancient Norwegian Monuments. ISBN 82-90052-48-0.
- Hartmann, Eivind; Mangset, Øistein; Reisegg, Øyvind (1997). Neste stasjon (in Norwegian). Gyldendal. ISBN 82-05-25294-7.
- Norwegian Trunk Railway (1904). Norsk Hoved-Jernbane i femti aar (in Norwegian).

| Preceding station | | | Following station |
|---|---|---|---|
| Nyland | Trunk Line | | Haugenstua |
| Preceding station | Local trains | | Following station |
| Nyland | L1 | Spikkestad–Oslo S–Lillestrøm | Haugenstua |
