= Peer Qvam =

Norwegian architect (1911–1977)

Peer Hafslo Qvam (24 December 1911 – 27 July 1977) was a Norwegian architect.

He was born at Holmestrand in Vestfold, Norway. He was a son of chemical engineer Olaf Hafslo Qvam (1873–1960) and his wife Sigrid Sørby (1875–1929). He enrolled as a student in 1931, and graduated in architecture from the Norwegian Institute of Technology in 1936. In 1938 he married Elsa Wik (1913-1981). He first worked for architects Johan Meyer, Dagfinn Morseth and Mads Wiel Gedde. In 1944 he started his own architect's office in Oslo. From 1946 to 1958, Qvam worked in partnership (Engh og Seip Arkitektkontor A/S) with John Engh.

Qvam is especially known for his railway station architecture. Qvam and Engh won a contest to design Oslo Central Station in 1946. From 1956 he was a consultant for the municipal office that planned the Oslo Tunnel, as well as two stations in this tunnel: Elisenberg and Nationaltheatret. He also designed seven stations in the Oslo Metro network. In the city center there were Jernbanetorget, Grønland and Tøyen, designed between 1961 and 1964 and opened in May 1966. On the Grorud Line there were Carl Berners plass, Risløkka, Vollebekk and Veitvet, designed between 1960 and 1964 and opened in October 1966.

== Gallery ==
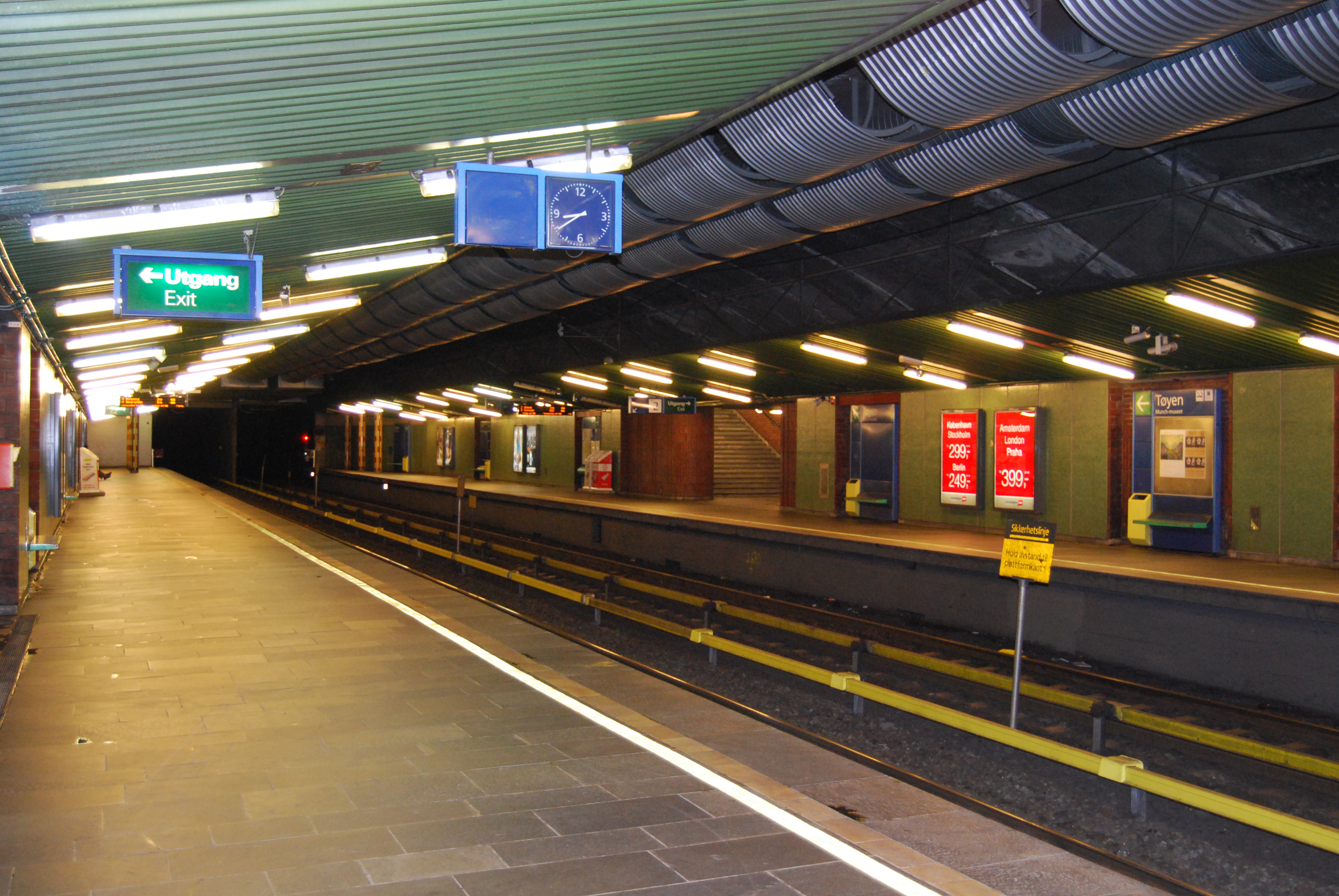
Toyen Metro Station

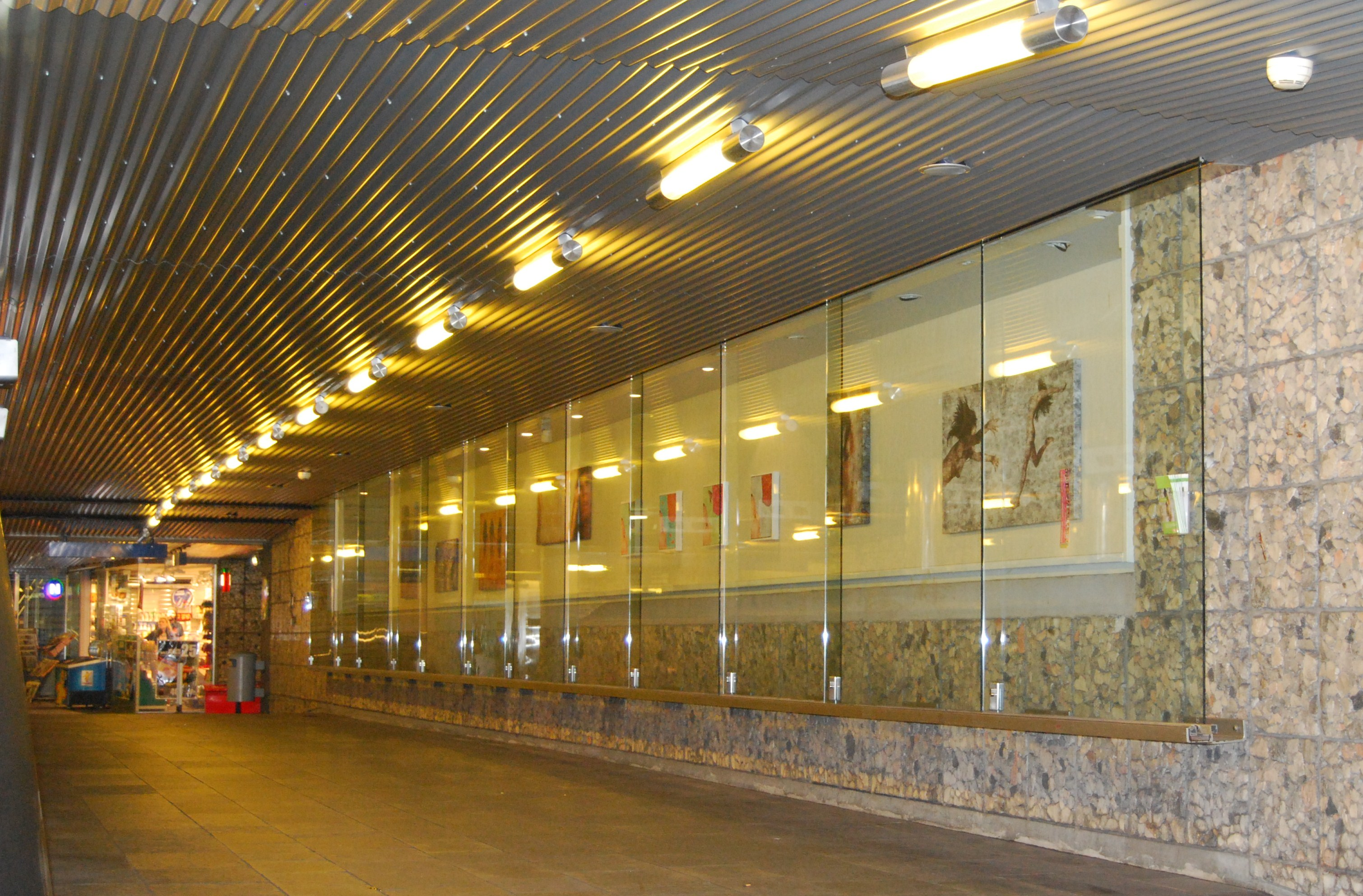
Jernbanetorget Metro Station

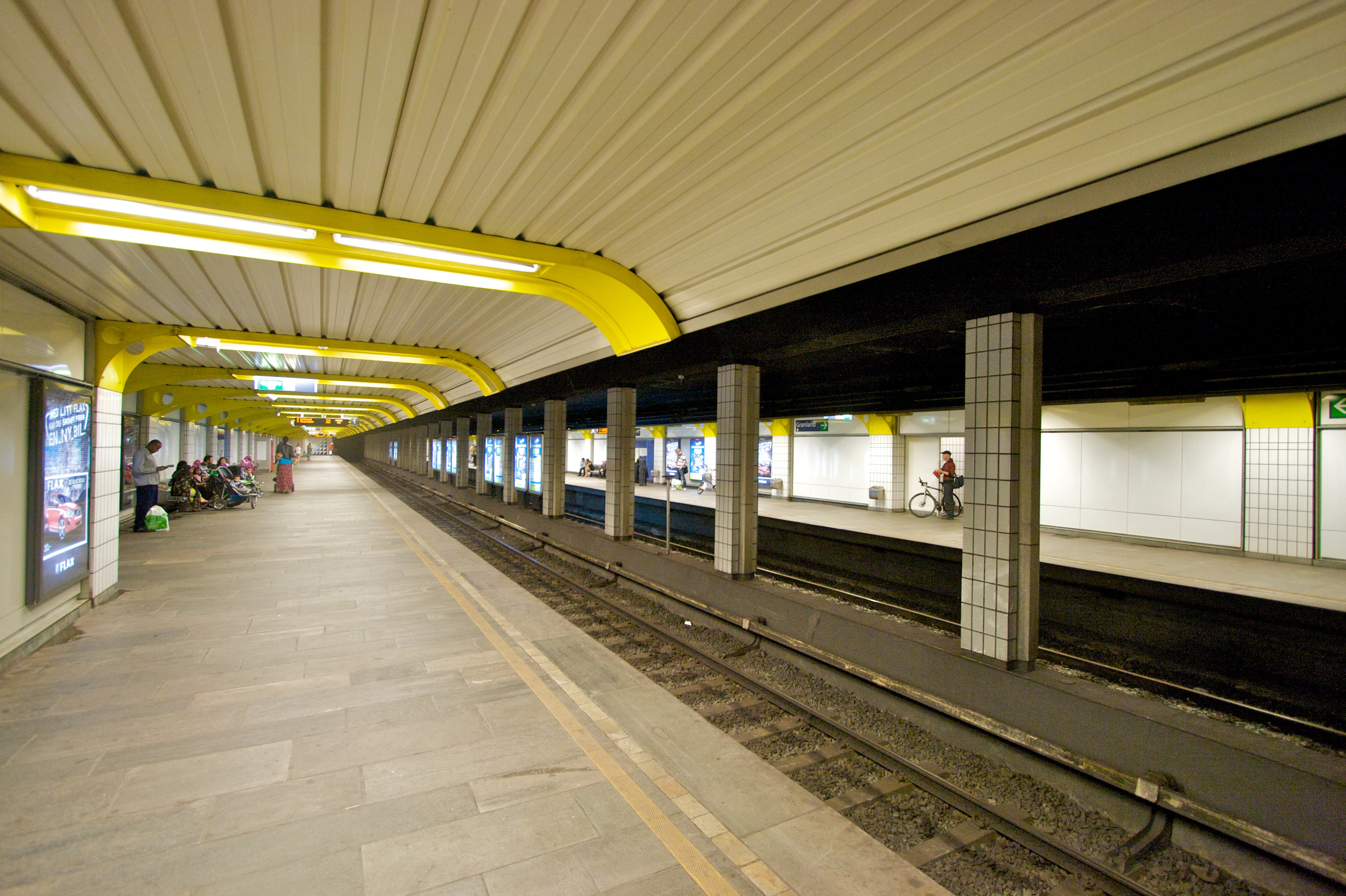
Grønland Metro Station

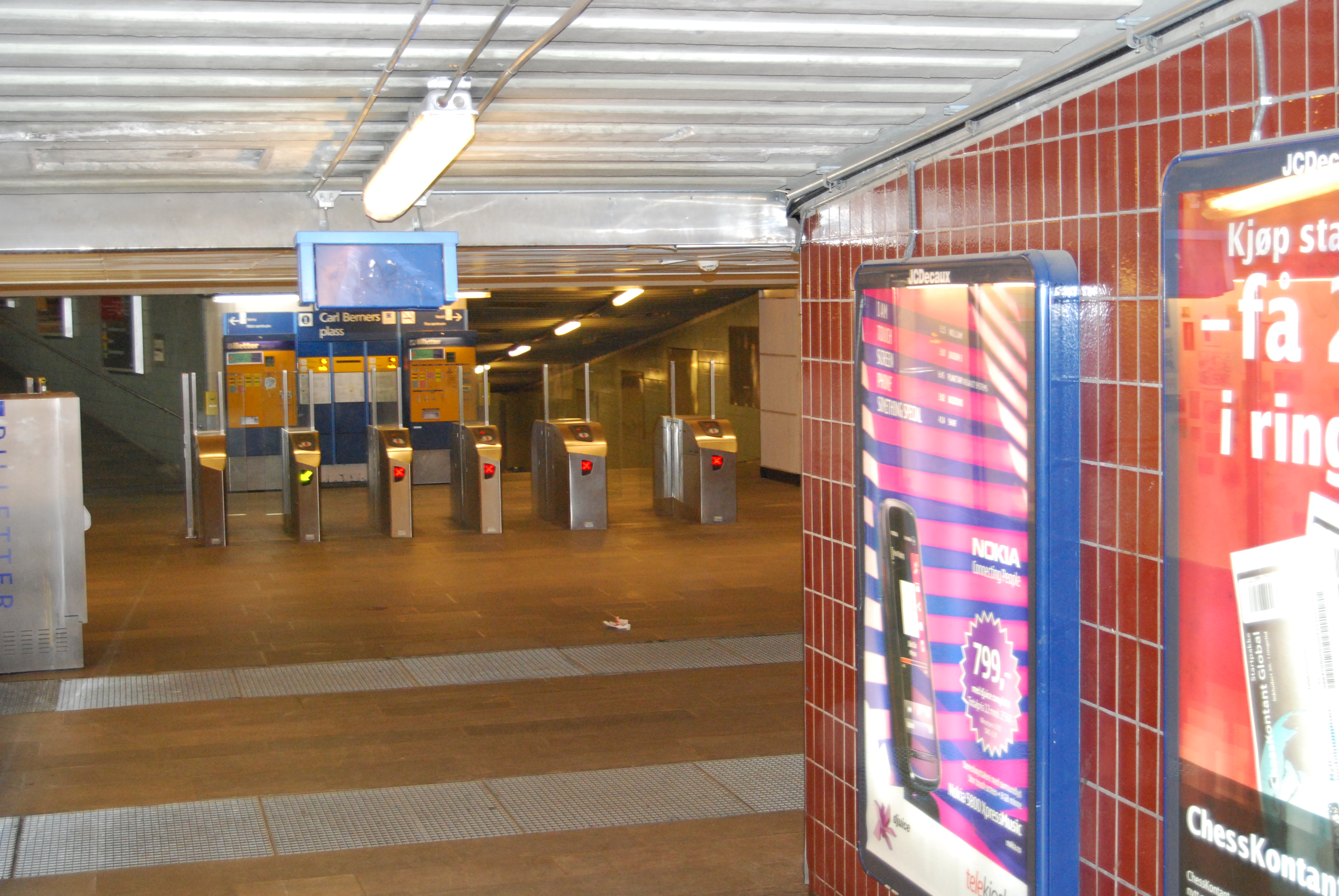
Carl Berners plass Metro Station

== Related reading ==
- Carroll L. V. Meeks (1995) The Railroad Station: An Architectural History (Courier Corporation) ISBN 9780486286273
