= Økern (station) =

Oslo metro station

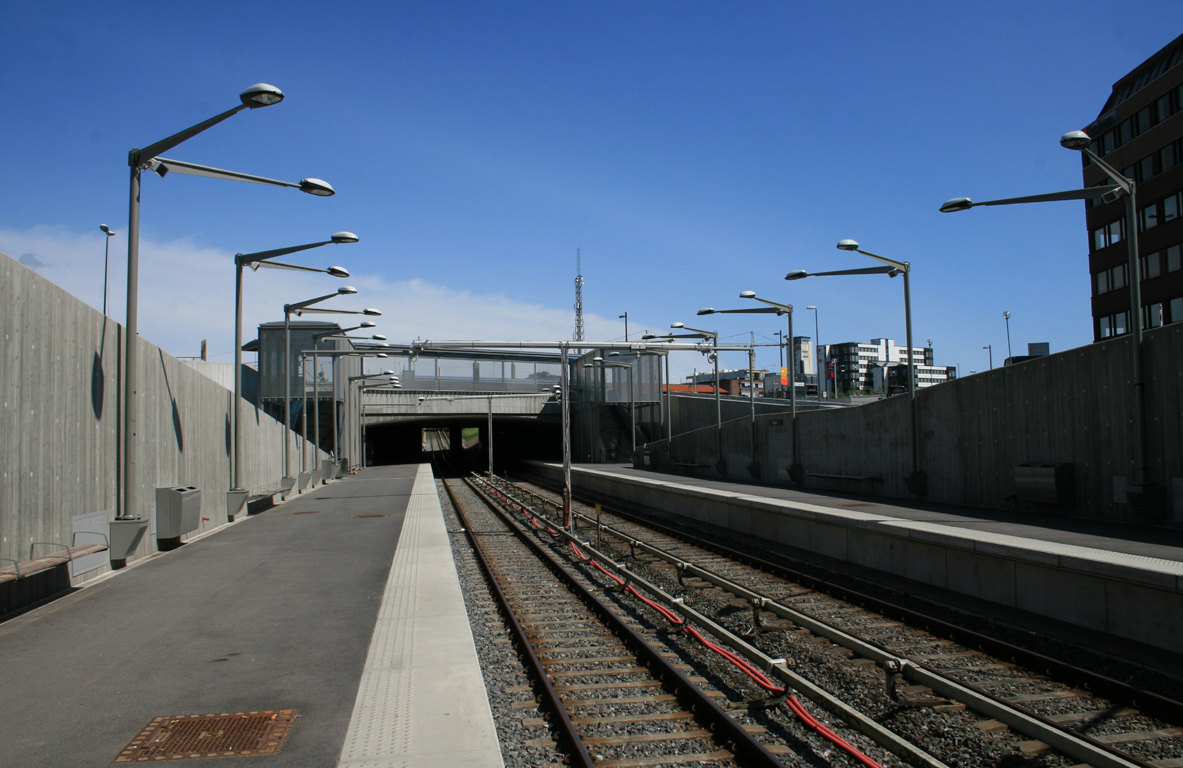

General information
- Location: Økern, Oslo; Norway
- Coordinates: 59°55′41″N 10°48′16″E
- Owner: Sporveien
- Operator: Sporveien T-banen
- Line: Grorud Line Løren Line
- Distance: 5.4 km (3.4 mi) from Stortinget

Construction
- Structure type: At-grade
- Accessible: Yes

History
- Opened: 16 October 1966
Location

Økern is a metro station on the No 5, Grorud Line of the Oslo Metro system, situated between stations Hasle and Risløkka in the lower parts of the Grorud Valley. It is located 2.7 km (the geodesic distance) northeast of station Stortinget (the Parliament). The station is part of the original stretch of the Grorud Line, and was opened on 16 October 1966. In 2010, the station was refurbished and partly rebuilt. New platforms are fitted with snowmelt systems.

The station is also located at the intersection of the metro line and the Ring 3 highway, which encircles most of the inner part of the city of Oslo.

The area around Økern is dominated by private enterprises, with the Økern Næringspark office park and the Økern shopping centre in the immediate vicinity.

== Transfer buses ==
Økern is a transportation hub with connections to bus lines:

23 (Lysaker - Simensbråten)
24 (Rush hour bus: Fornebu - Brynseng)
28 (Rush hour bus: Fornebu via Carl Berners Plass and Majorstuen
60 (Tonsenhagen - Vippetangen)
67 (Rush hour bus: Lørenskog Sentrum via Nyland Station)
345 (Rush hour bus: Vestvollen via Olavsgaard)
5N (Night bus: Vestli - Jernbanetorget)
FB3 (Bekkestua - Oslo Airport)
126 (Oslo Bus terminal - Brandbu)

Preceding station	Oslo Metro	Following station
Løren towards Bergkrystallen	Line 4	Risløkka towards Vestli
Hasle towards Ring Line and Sognsvann	Line 5	Risløkka towards Vestli
