= Rødtvet (station) =

Oslo metro station

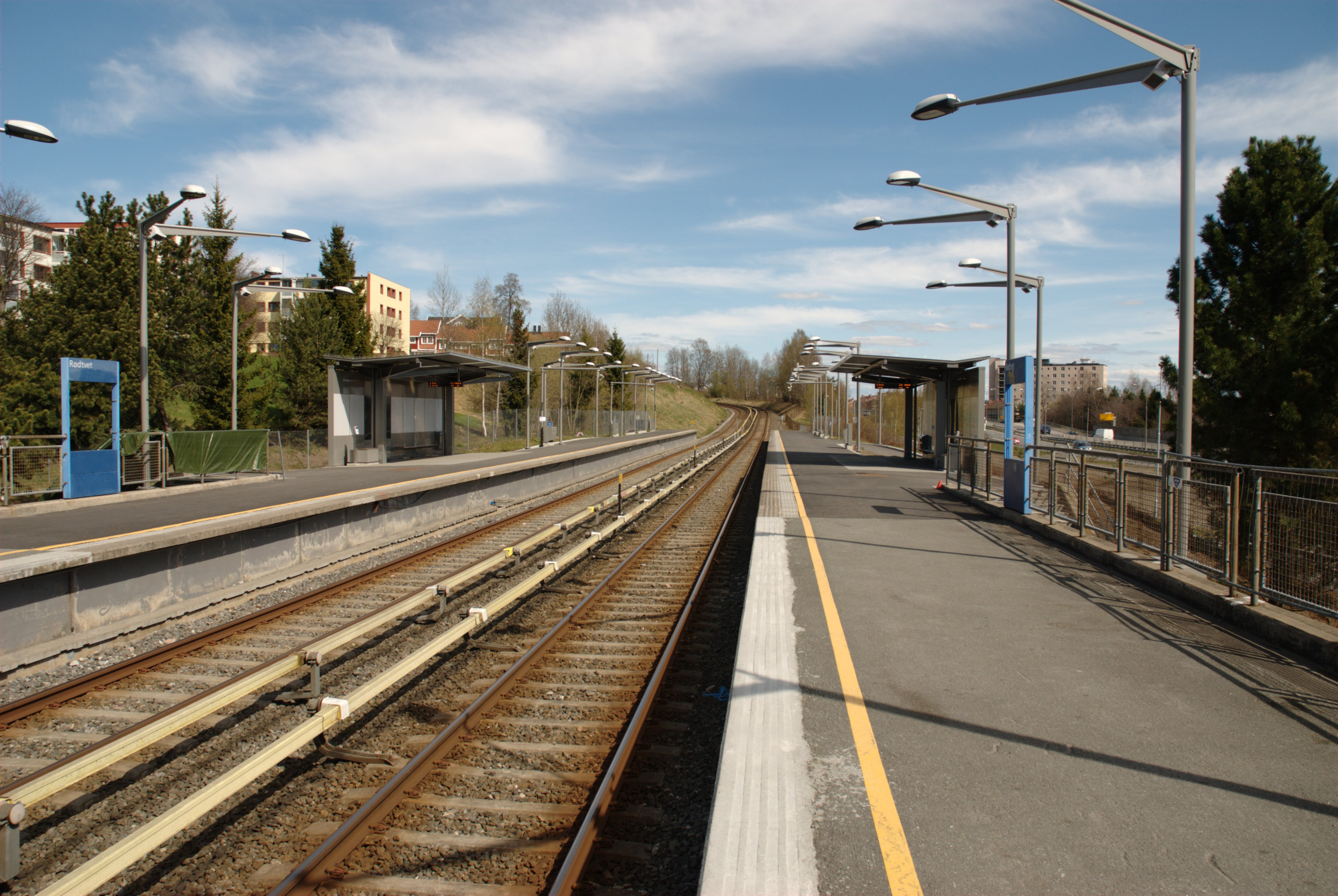

General information
- Location: Grorud, Oslo; Norway
- Coordinates: 59°57′03″N 10°51′25″E
- Owner: Sporveien
- Operator: Sporveien T-banen
- Line: Grorud Line
- Distance: 9.5 km (5.9 mi) from Stortinget

Construction
- Structure type: At-grade
- Accessible: Yes

History
- Opened: 16 October 1966
Location

Rødtvet is a station on Grorud Line (Lines 4 and 5) of the Oslo Metro. The station is located in north-central Groruddalen, between the stations of Veitvet and Kalbakken, 9.5 kilometers (5.9 mi) from Stortinget.

The station was opened 10 October 1966 as part of the original stretch of the Grorud Line. The station's architect was Karl Stenersen.

Preceding station	Oslo Metro	Following station
Veitvet towards Bergkrystallen	Line 4	Kalbakken towards Vestli
Veitvet towards Ring Line and Sognsvann	Line 5	Kalbakken towards Vestli
