= Risløkka (station) =

Oslo metro station

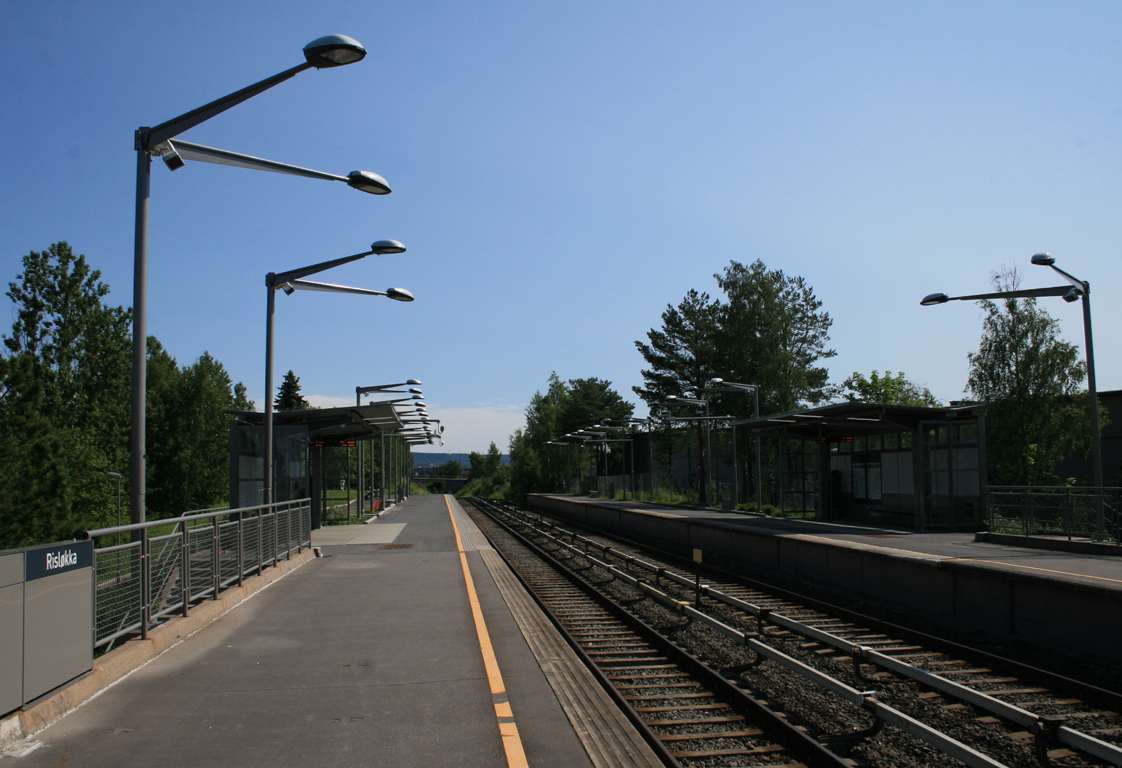

General information
- Location: Risløkka, Oslo; Norway
- Coordinates: 59°55′56″N 10°49′23″E
- Owner: Sporveien
- Operator: Sporveien T-banen
- Line: Grorud Line
- Distance: 6.5 km (4.0 mi) from Stortinget

Construction
- Structure type: At-grade
- Accessible: Yes

History
- Opened: 16 October 1966
Location

Risløkka is a station on Grorud Line (line 5) on the Oslo Metro. The station lies between Økern and Vollebekk and is situated 6.5 km from Stortinget. The station is among the original stations on the line and was opened ob 16 October 1966. Peer Qvam was the station's architect.

The line bridges the local road Risløkkalleen immediately east of the station. To the north of the station is a largely residential area, with several detached houses. To the south is a more industrial area, including the main office for the road construction company Oslo Vei, the successor to Oslo's public road constructor. Also near the subway station is a base for the Norwegian Public Roads Administration which deals with driver and vehicle licensing.

Preceding station	Oslo Metro	Following station
Økern towards Bergkrystallen	Line 4	Vollebekk towards Vestli
Økern towards Ring Line and Sognsvann	Line 5	Vollebekk towards Vestli
