= Kalbakken (station) =

Oslo metro station

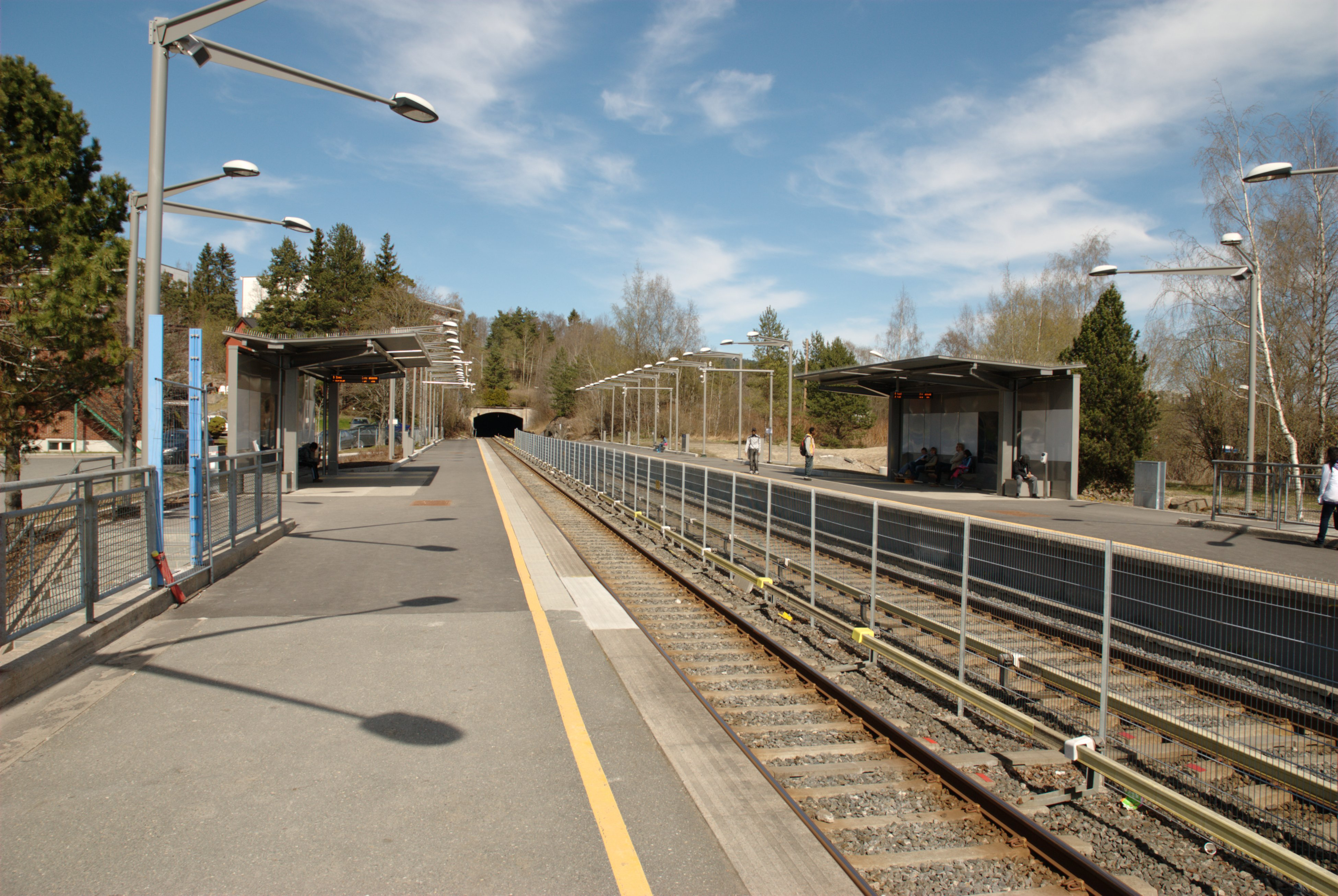

General information
- Location: Kalbakken, Oslo; Norway
- Coordinates: 59°57′14″N 10°52′0″E
- Elevation: 183.0 m (600.4 ft)
- Owner: Sporveien
- Operator: Sporveien T-banen
- Line: Grorud Line
- Distance: 10.1 km (6.3 mi) from Stortinget

Construction
- Structure type: At-grade
- Accessible: Yes

History
- Opened: 16 October 1966
Location

Kalbakken is the station on Grorud Line of the Oslo Metro between Rødtvet and Ammerud. It is located in the Grorud borough. Kalbakken is part of the original stretch of the Grorud Line opened 16 October 1966.

The Kalbakken neighbourhood is mostly residential. The subway station is located on a hill on the north side and much of the neighbourhood is within reasonable walking distance, such as the general shopping and food stores. The neighbourhood also has a riding school, a library, a public swimming pool and activity centers for both seniors and adolescents, all of which are located in the Nordtvet area of Kalbakken.

Preceding station	Oslo Metro	Following station
Rødtvet towards Bergkrystallen	Line 4	Ammerud towards Vestli
Rødtvet towards Ring Line and Sognsvann	Line 5	Ammerud towards Vestli
