= Linderud (station) =

Oslo metro station

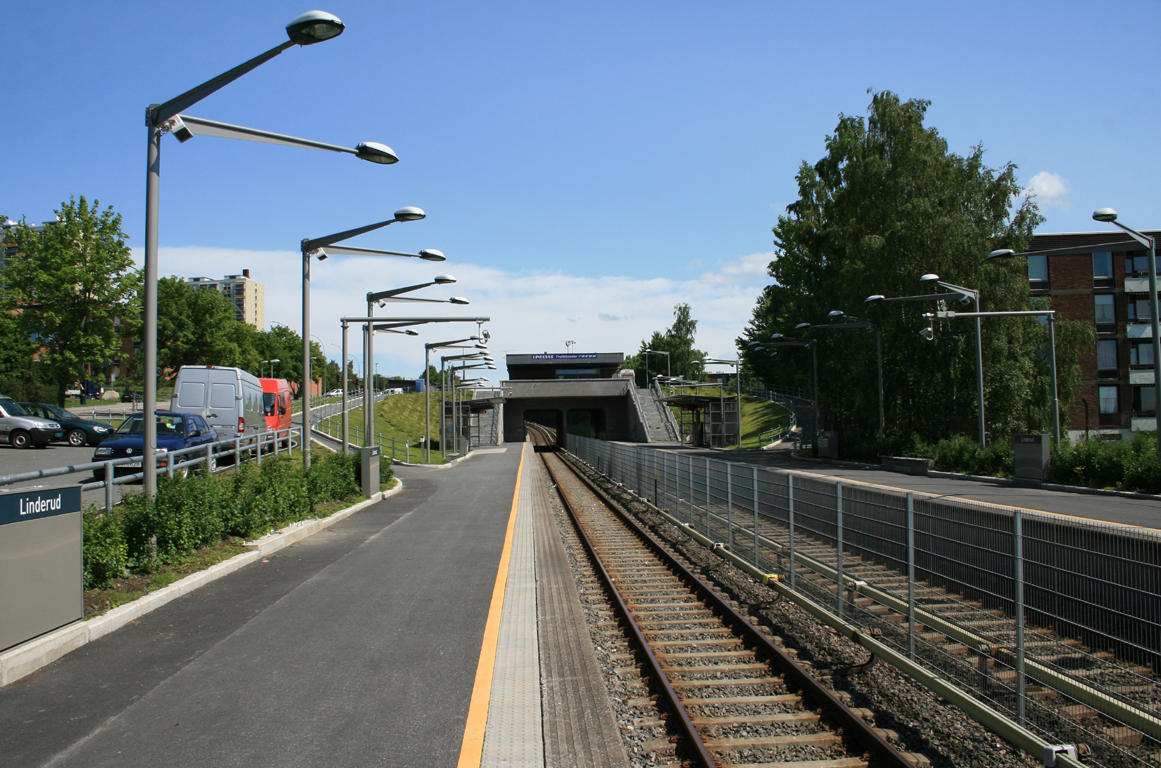

General information
- Location: Linderud, Bjerke, Oslo; Norway
- Coordinates: 59°56′26″N 10°50′21″E
- Owner: Sporveien
- Operator: Sporveien T-banen
- Line: Grorud Line
- Distance: 7.8 km (4.8 mi) from Stortinget
- Connections: 60 Vippetangen — Tonsenhagen

Construction
- Structure type: At-grade
- Accessible: Yes

History
- Opened: 16 October 1966
Location

Linderud is a station on Grorud Line of the Oslo Metro located between Vollebekk and Veitvet in Norway. The station is located in the Bjerke borough. Linderud is a residential area, with several tall apartment buildings. The area has a modern shopping centre (formerly known as EPA Centre), located 400 meters (1,300 ft) from the station.

Preceding station	Oslo Metro	Following station
Vollebekk towards Bergkrystallen	Line 4	Veitvet towards Vestli
Vollebekk towards Ring Line and Sognsvann	Line 5	Veitvet towards Vestli
