= John Engh =

Norwegian architect (1915–1996)

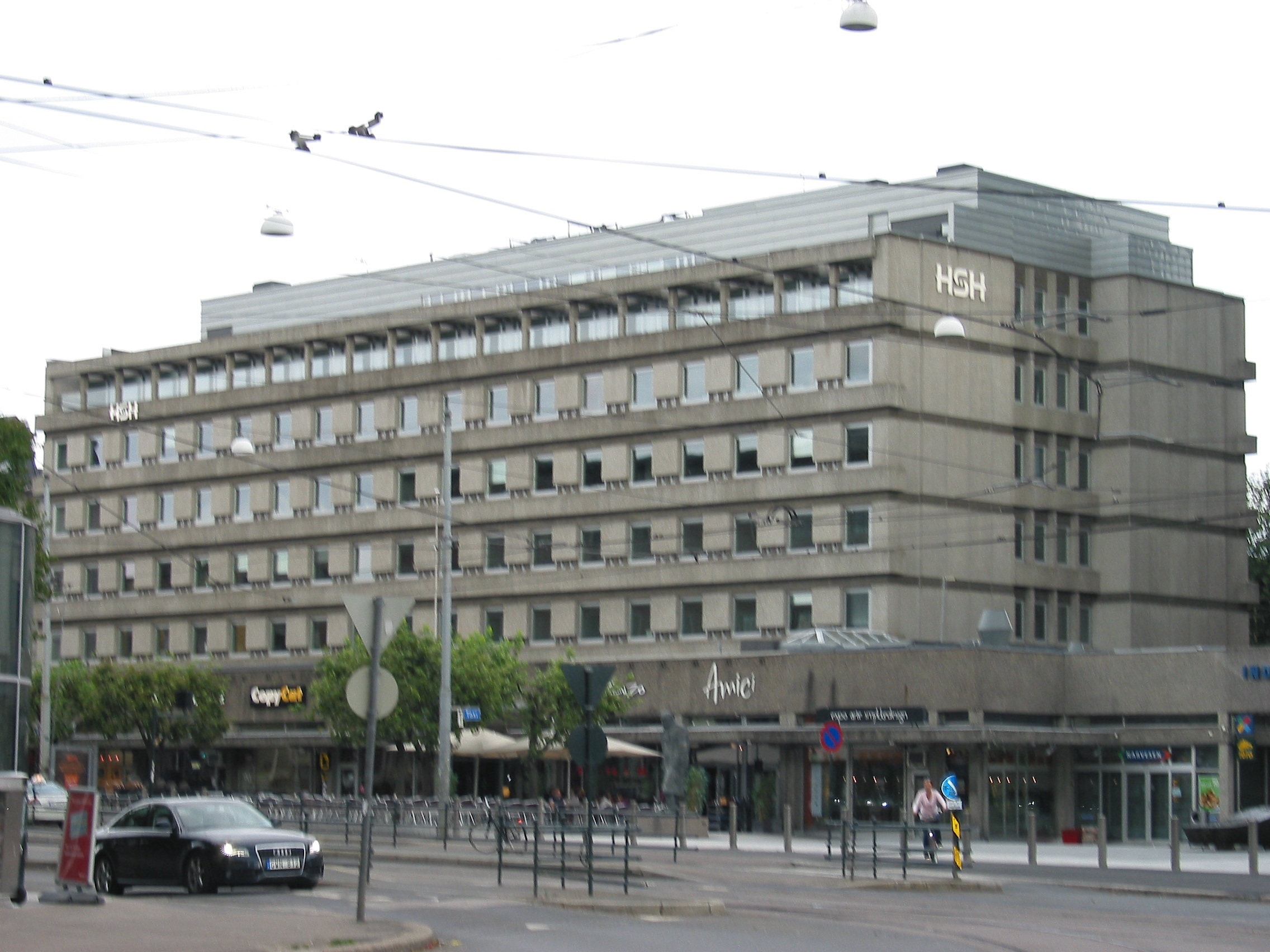
HSH headquarters

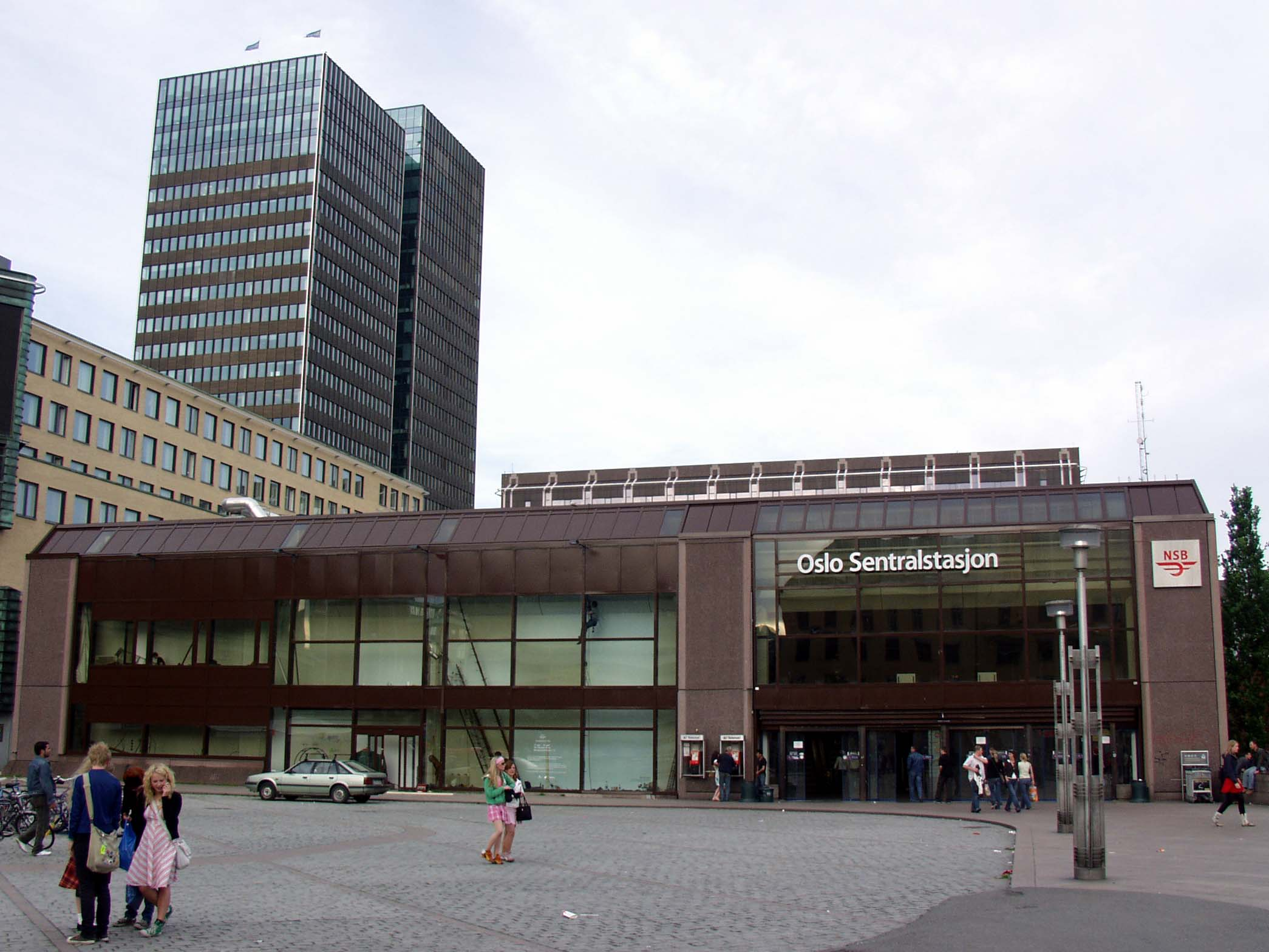
Oslo Central Station

John Engh (5 June 1915 – 5 December 1996) was a Norwegian architect, most known for his innovative work in stone and concrete.

Engh was born in New York City. He was the son of Adolf Abel Engh (1884–1941) and Anna Madsine Hald (1888–1972). His father was a Norwegian engineer who was working in the United States at the time of his birth. Engh grew up in Catalonia, Spain, where his father also worked as an engineer. Engh was educated at ETH Zürich and the Norwegian Institute of Technology where he earned his diploma in 1938. He had apprenticeships at various architectural firms in Oslo, Barcelona, and Pittsburgh before being hired as an architect with the Royal Norwegian Air Force at CFB Borden in Canada. During the World War II, he served at the Norwegian bases in Canada, where he designed and led development of the Little Norway and Little Skaugum. He also worked for the United States government on reconstruction projects (1943 to 1945).

Upon returning to Scandinavia, he worked for the Scandinavian Airlines System in Stockholm (1945–1946). He later moved to Oslo where he joined in partnership with Peer Qvam (1946–1958). In 1970, he entered into partnership with Jon Seip (Engh og Seip Arkitektkontor A/S). He sat on the board of Norwegian Architects' Association from 1952 to 1968 from 1964 as president. His designs include the Oslo Central Station, HSH headquarters, Indekshuset at Solli plass in Oslo and several other offices buildings. He designed the Norwegian Embassy in Brasília (1984) and acted as local architect for the building of the American Embassy in Oslo which was designed by Eero Saarinen. He died in Bærum during 1996.
