= Vollebekk (station) =

Oslo metro station

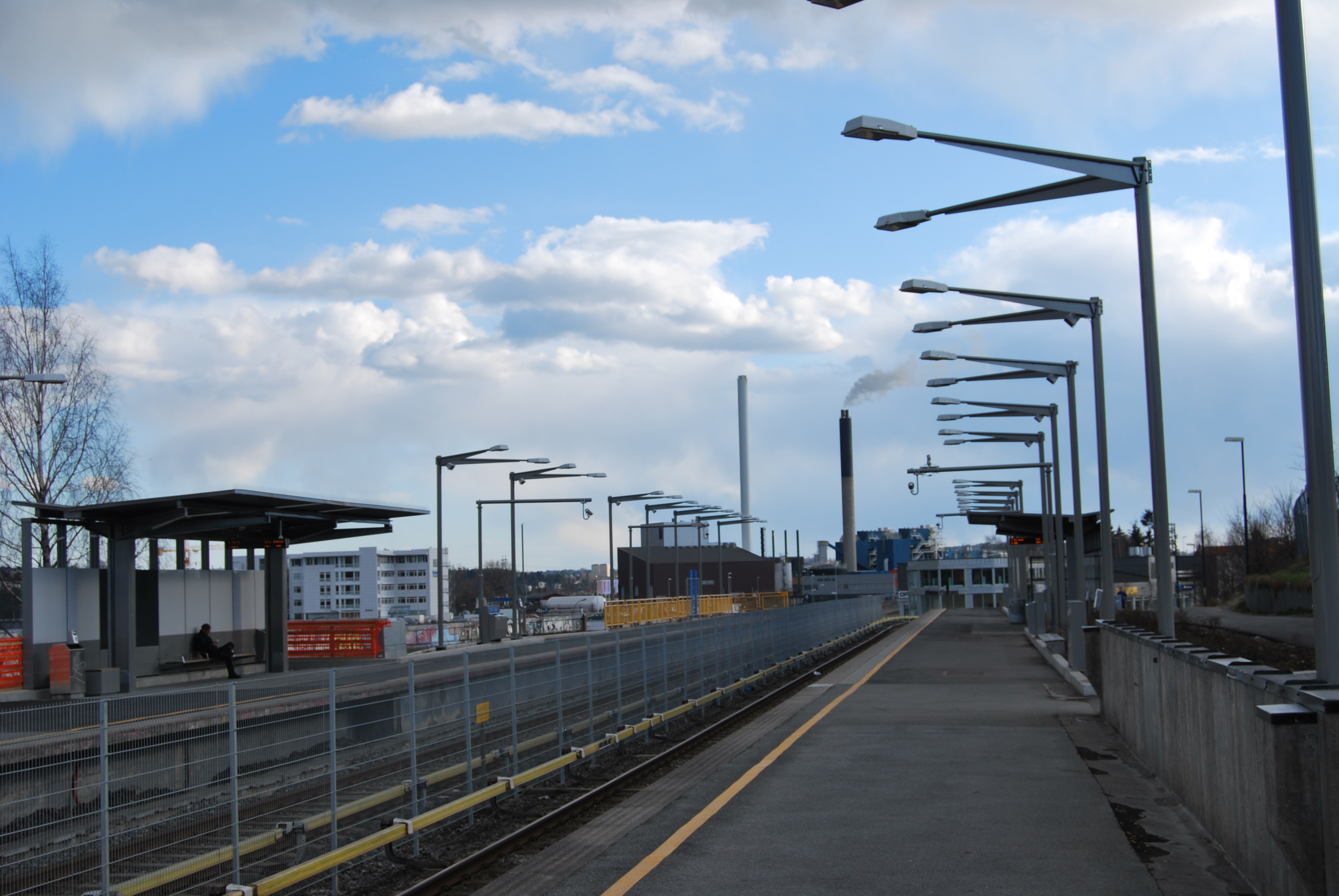

General information
- Location: Bjerke, Oslo; Norway
- Coordinates: 59°56′12″N 10°49′53″E
- Owner: Sporveien
- Operator: Sporveien T-banen
- Line: Grorud Line
- Distance: 7.1 km (4.4 mi) from Stortinget

Construction
- Structure type: At-grade
- Accessible: Yes

History
- Opened: 16 October 1966
Location

Vollebekk is a station on the Grorud Line (line 5) of the Oslo Metro. It is located between the stations of Risløkka and Linderud and is 7.1 kilometers (4.4 mi) from Stortinget. The station is among the original ones on Grorudbanen, and opened on 10 October 1966. Peer Qvaam was the station's architect.

The local road Lunden passes under the station immediately north of the station. There is no major bus connection, although there is a bus stop on the Østre Aker Vei highway to the south. The railway station Alna is also nearby, and there are plans to connect the two stations by means of a pedestrian and bicycle path in 2009.

| Preceding station | Oslo Metro | Following station |
|---|---|---|
| Risløkka towards Bergkrystallen | Line 4 | Linderud towards Vestli |
| Risløkka towards Ring Line and Sognsvann | Line 5 | Linderud towards Vestli |
