= Veitvet (station) =

Oslo metro station

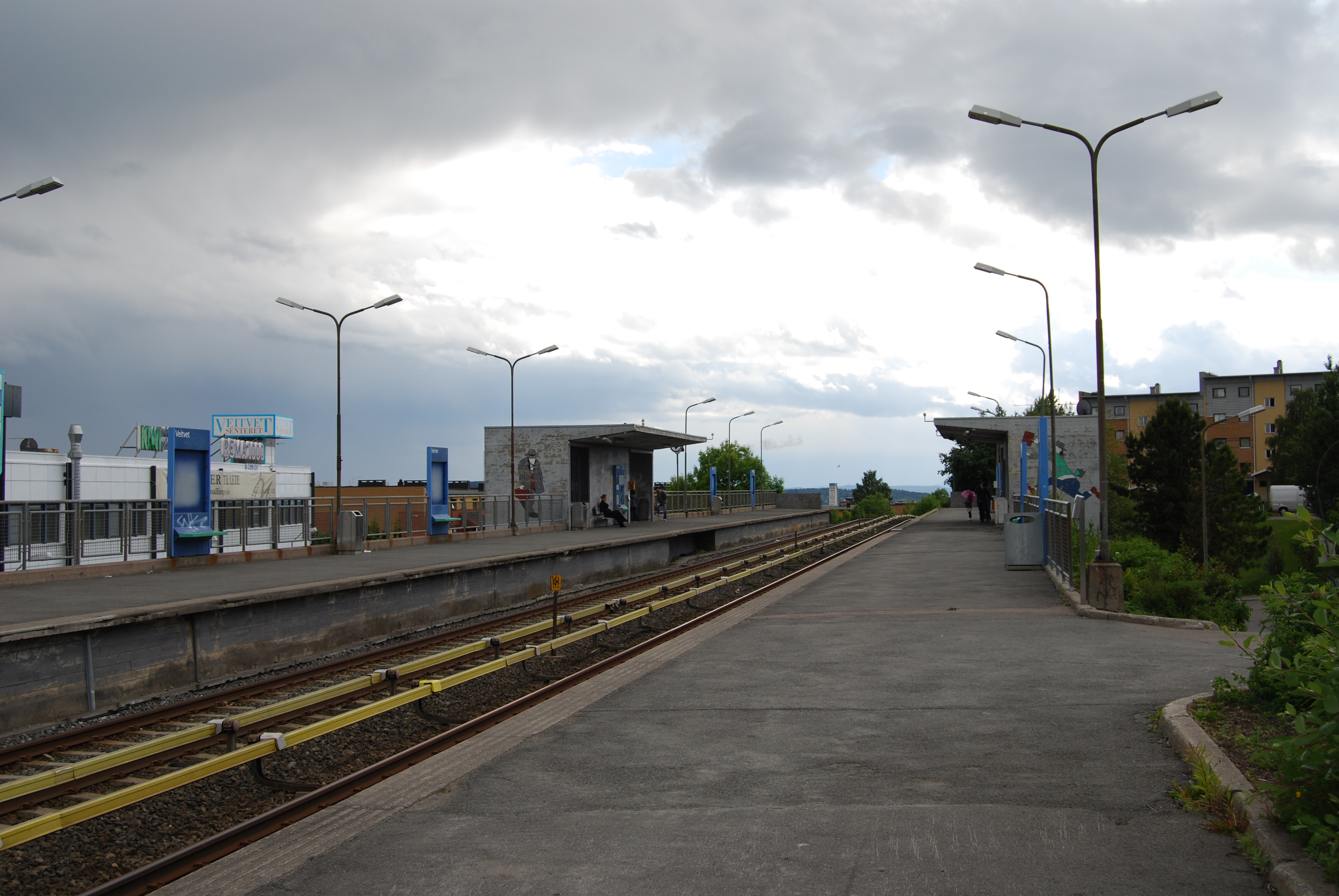

General information
- Location: Veitvet, Oslo; Norway
- Coordinates: 59°56′40″N 10°50′47″E
- Elevation: 157.6 m (517 ft)
- Owner: Sporveien
- Operator: Sporveien T-banen
- Line: Grorud Line
- Distance: 8.4 km (5.2 mi) from Stortinget

Construction
- Structure type: At-grade
- Accessible: Yes

History
- Opened: 16 October 1966
Location

Veitvet is a station on Grorud Line (Line 5) on the Oslo Metro. It is located at Veitvet between Linderud and Rødtvet, 8.4 kilometers (5.2 mi) from Stortinget. It was opened on 16 October 1966. Like much of the eastern subway network, the station is located in a largely residential area with apartment buildings. The station is located just north of the Veitvet Shopping Centre.

Preceding station	Oslo Metro	Following station
Linderud towards Bergkrystallen	Line 4	Rødtvet towards Vestli
Linderud towards Ring Line and Sognsvann	Line 5	Rødtvet towards Vestli
