= Munkelia (station) =

Oslo metro station

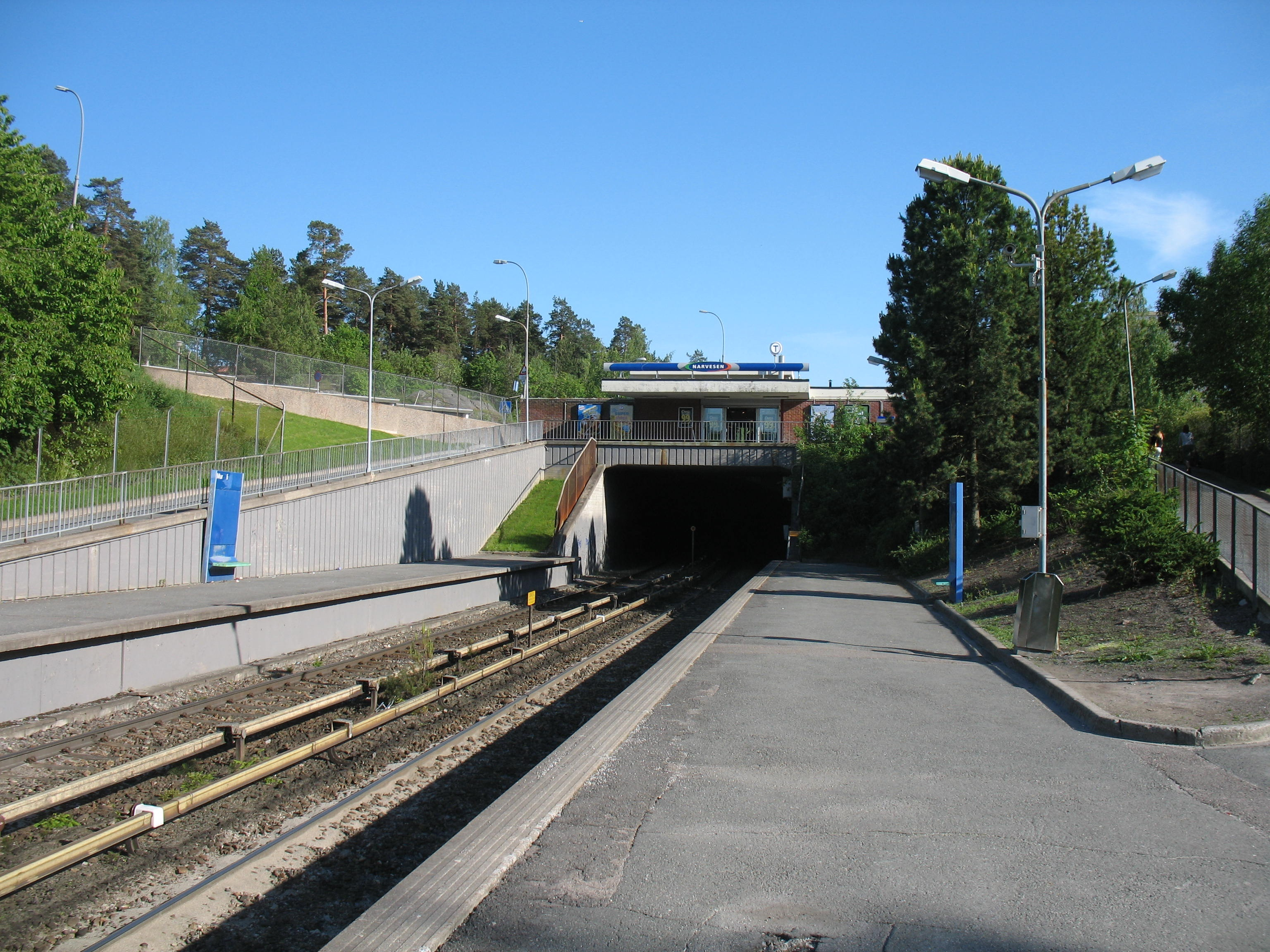

General information
- Location: Lambertseter, Oslo; Norway
- Coordinates: 59°52′06″N 10°48′46″E
- Owner: Sporveien
- Operator: Sporveien T-banen
- Line: Lambertseter Line
- Distance: 10.0 km (6.2 mi) from Stortinget

Construction
- Structure type: At-grade
- Accessible: Yes

History
- Opened: 28 April 1957
Location

Munkelia is the second last station on Lambertseter Line of the Oslo Metro, between Lambertseter and Bergkrystallen, 10.0 km (6.2 mi) from Stortinget. The station is served by Lines 1 and 4. The station is located just north of the entrance of one of the few tunnels on this subway line. The entrance to the two platforms is to the south.

The station was opened 22 May 1966. Guttorm Bruskeland was the architect .

Preceding station	Oslo Metro	Following station
Lambertseter towards Frognerseteren	Line 1	Bergkrystallen Terminus
Lambertseter towards Vestli	Line 4	Bergkrystallen Terminus
