= Veitvet =

Neighborhood in Oslo, Norway

Coordinates: 59°57′N 10°51′E

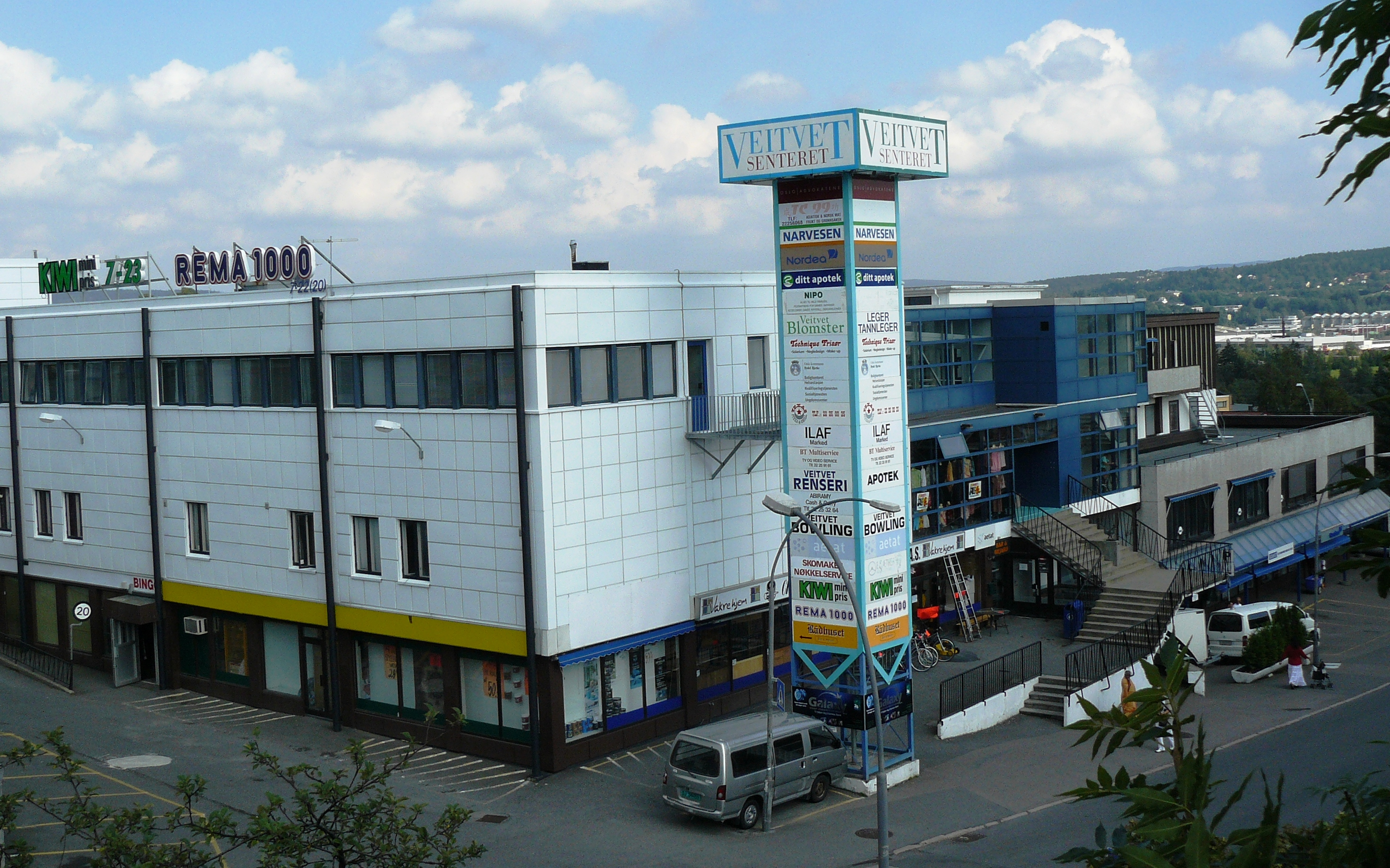
Veitvet senter

Veitvet is a neighborhood in the Bjerke borough of Oslo, Norway. The area borders to Linderud, Tonsenhagen and Bredtvet.

Veitvet senter is located in the neighborhood which was Norway's first shopping mall and was Scandinavia's largest when it opened in 1958. The area is served by the Veitvet metro station.
