= Bergkrystallen station =

Oslo metro station

Bergkrystallen
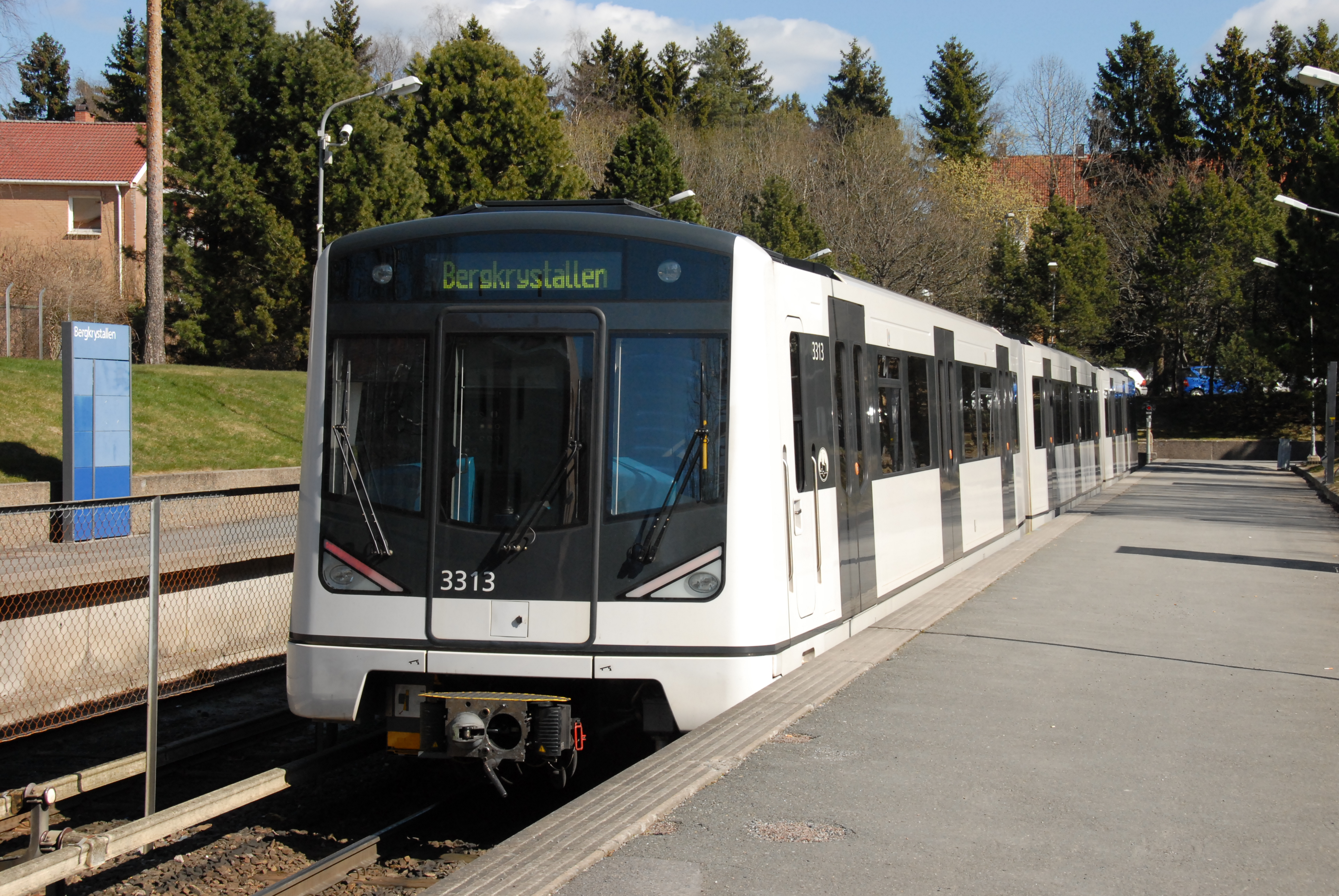

General information
- Location: Lambertseter, Oslo; Norway
- Coordinates: 59°52′01″N 10°49′17″E
- Elevation: 160.0 m (524.9 ft)
- Owner: Sporveien
- Operator: Sporveien T-banen
- Line: Lambertseter Line
- Distance: 10.5 km (6.5 mi) from Stortinget

Construction
- Structure type: At-grade
- Accessible: Yes

History
- Opened: 28 April 1957
Location

Bergkrystallen is the end station on the Lambertseter Line, after Munkelia, of the Oslo Metro. It is located in the Nordstrand borough. Bergkrystallen is a road just north of the station. The area is mainly residential. Originally it was planned to extend the Lambertseter Line to Mortensrud, but the Østensjø Line was extended instead. The station is served by Line 4.

Bergkrystallen was opened as the end stop of the Lambertseter tram line in 1957, it was upgraded to a subway station in 1966. Although the subway system was formally opened by the king at Jernbanetorget on 22 May 1966, the king and mayor travelled the line to Bergkrystallen where there was a ceremonial bouquet presentation in front of a large audience.

The building of more residential apartments on the station has met local resistance. In 2007, a proposal was made to build some terraced housing and a kindergarten on the station.

Preceding station	Oslo Metro	Following station
Munkelia towards Frognerseteren	Line 1	Terminus
Munkelia towards Vestli	Line 4	Terminus
