= Østensjø Line =

Metro line in Oslo, Norway

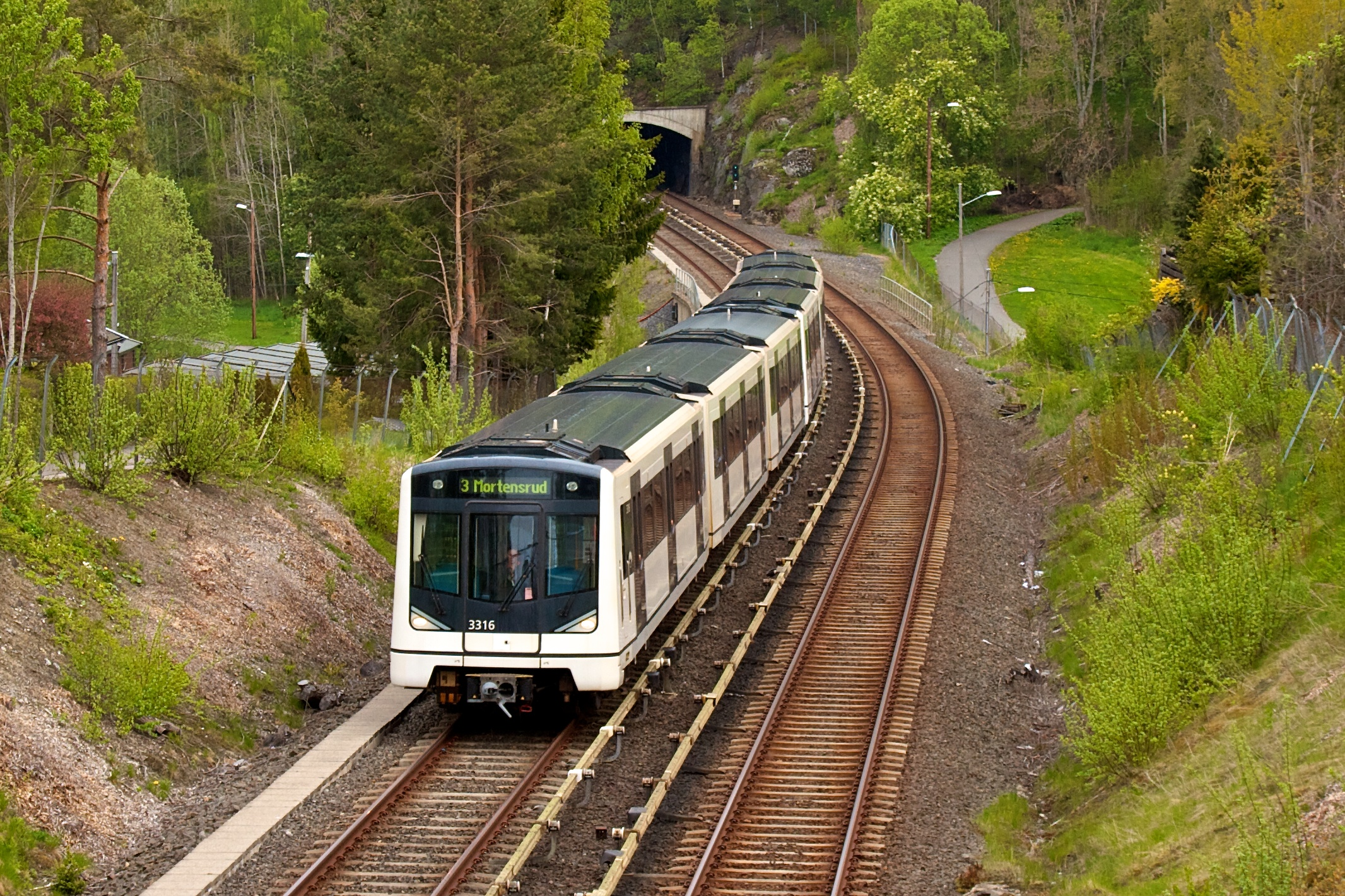
- MX3000 train near Skullerud

Overview
- Native name: Østensjøbanen
- Owner: Sporveien
- Termini: Tøyen; Mortensrud
- Stations: 13

Service
- Type: Rapid transit
- System: Oslo Metro
- Operator(s): Sporveien T-banen
- Rolling stock: MX3000

History
- Opened: 18 December 1923

Technical
- Line length: 11.5 km (7.1 mi)
- Number of tracks: Double
- Track gauge: 1,435 mm (4 ft 8 1/2 in) standard gauge
- Electrification: 750 V DC third rail
- Operating speed: 70 km/h (43 mph)
- Highest elevation: 152.4 m (500 ft)

The Østensjø Line (Norwegian: Østensjøbanen) is a 9.0-kilometre (5.6 mi) line on the Oslo Metro which runs from Brynseng to Mortensrud. It further shares track with the Lambertseter Line along the 2.5-kilometre (1.6 mi) section from Tøyen to Brynseng. The line runs through the primary residential areas of Bøler, Østensjø and Søndre Nordstrand. The line is served by Line 3 of the metro.

The first section of the line was built by Akersbanerne as part of the Oslo Tramway and connected to the Vålerenga Line at Etterstad. The first section, to Bryn, opened on 18 December 1923, and was extended to Oppsal in January 1926. Services were variously provided by Kristiania Sporveisselskab, Bærumsbanen and Oslo Sporveier. Proposals for making the line part of the metro arose in the late 1940s and the system was approved in 1956. This materialised in an extension of the line to Bøler on 20 July 1958. The Østensjø Line became the third line of the metro on 26 November 1967, the same day the line was extended to Skullerud. The last extension, to Mortensrud, commenced services on 24 November 1997. There are proposals to extend the line further south to Bjørndal and Gjersrud.

== Route ==
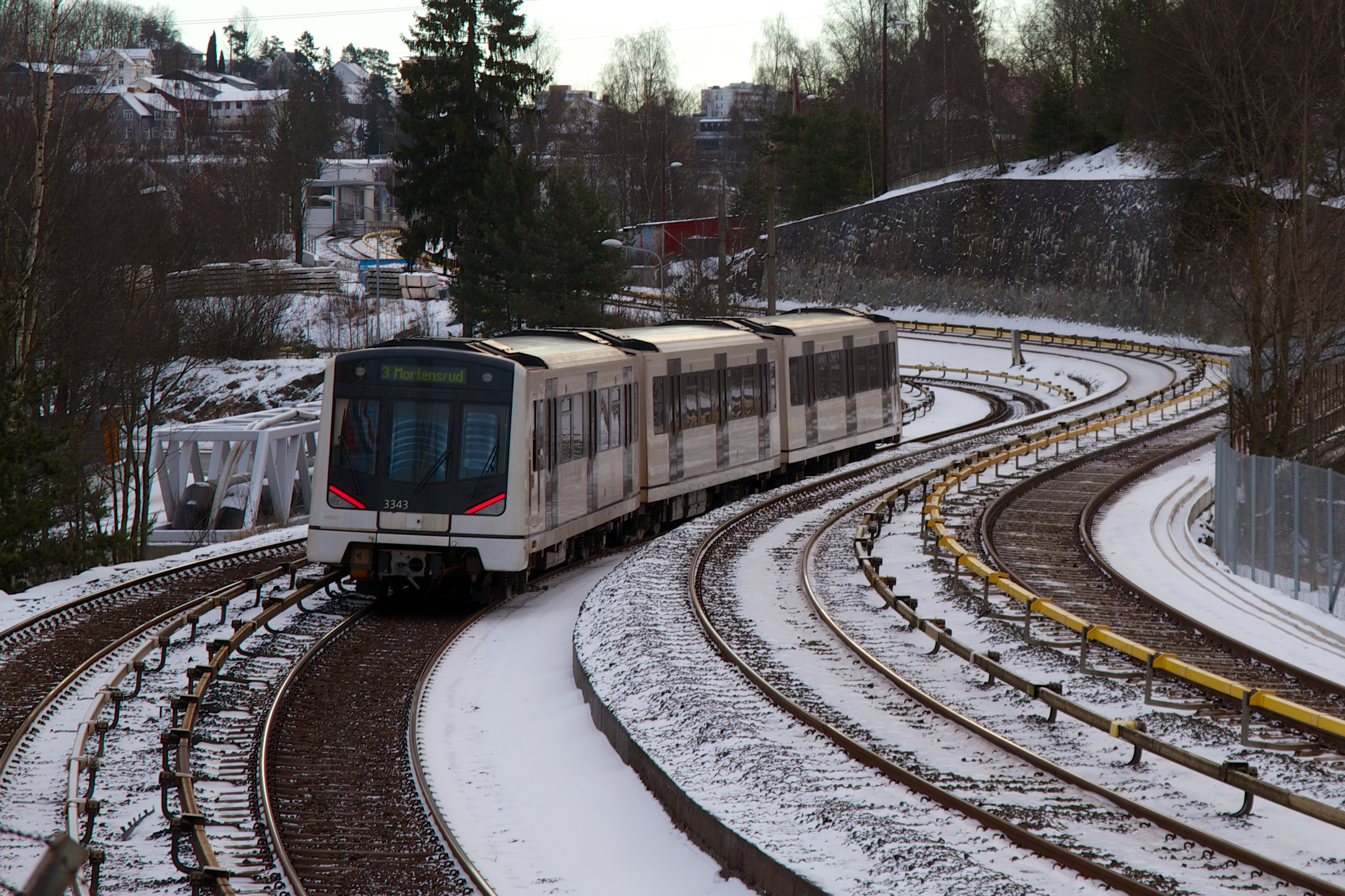
MX3000 near Brynseng, where the Østensjø Line runs next to the Lambertseter Line (right)

The Østensjø Line runs from Tøyen on the Common Tunnel to Mortensrud, a distance of 9.0 kilometres (5.6 mi). The segment from Tøyen to Brynseng can arguably be regarded as part of the Common Line or as part of the Østensjø Line. From Tøyen, where the Grorud Line branches off from the Common Tunnel, the line makes a 180-degree loop under the Tøyen Park. At this point there is also a direct, single-track tunnel which allows non-revenue trains access from the Grorud Line. The line passes under the Gjøvik Line and leaves the tunnel just before Ensjø Station, which is located on a short section of ground-level track. After Ensjø the line enters a new tunnel at Malerhaugen, which includes the underground Helsfyr Station. Immediately afterwards it ascends to ground level and continues to Brynseng Station. In this intermediate section the line passes a maintenance of way depot and splits, with the Lambertseter Line receiving separate tracks at Brynseng. Both Helsfyr and Brynseng are the site of several large offices complexes.

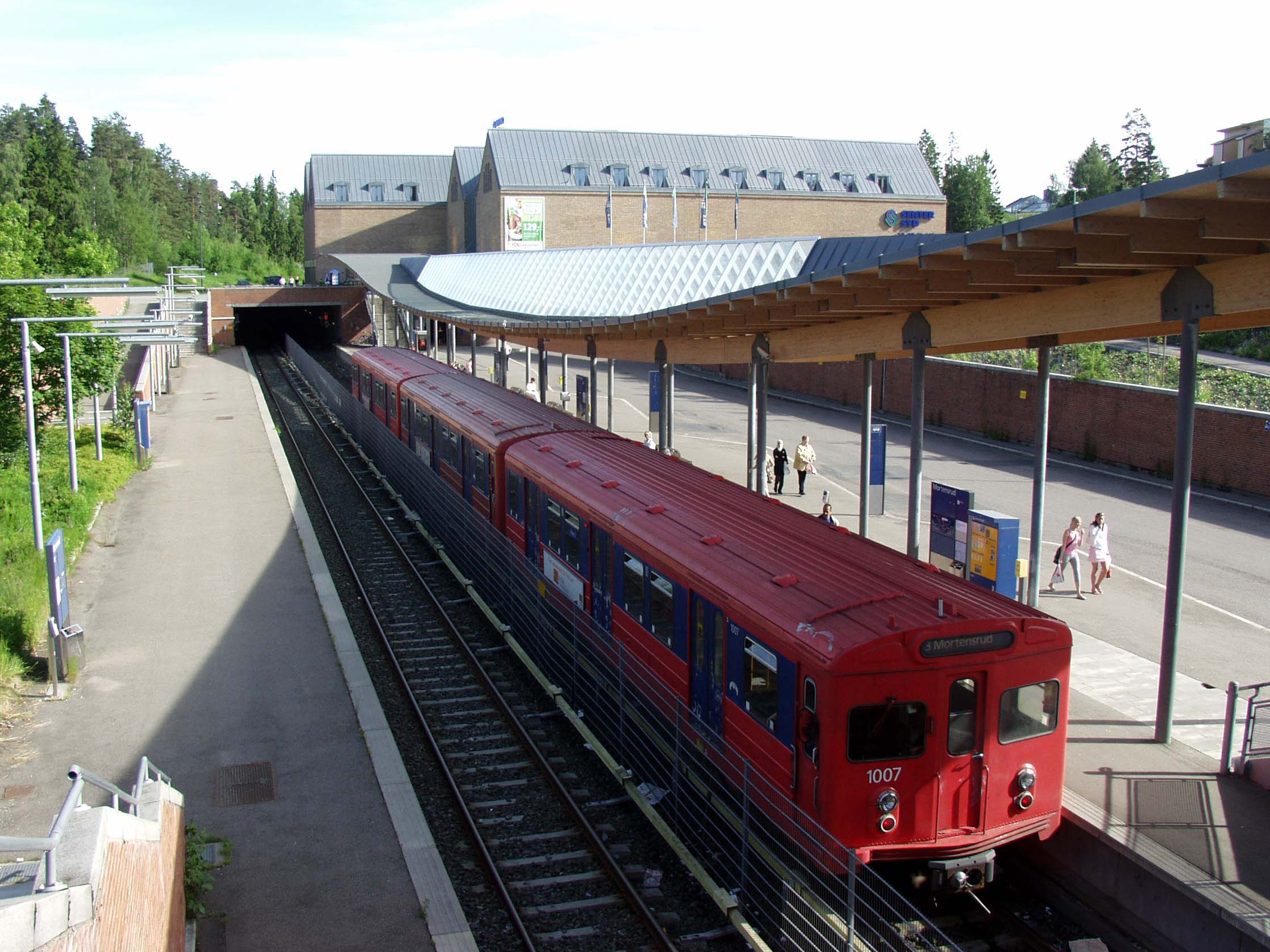
T1000 train at Mortensrud, the line's terminus

At Brynseng lines continue concurrently across a bridge over the Trunk Line and then the Lambertseter Line branch off towards Høyenhall Station. The Østensjø Line continues to Hellerud Station, after which the Furuset Line branches off. The line then turns southwards and runs 550 metres (1,800 ft) to Godlia Station, which is located on an elevated section of track. It continues for 870 metres (2,850 ft) past Skøyenåsen Station and then 770 metres (2,530 ft) to Oppsal Station. Next the line runs through a 300-metre (980 ft) tunnel under Haakon Tveters vei and Østmarkveien. It passes Ulsrud, before it starts running parallel to General Ruges vei and passes Bøler and Bogerud Stations. Immediately afterwards it runs through a tunnel and continues onwards to Skullerud Station. The line then runs along a 2.5-kilometre (1.6 mi) section, consisting of a 190-metre (620 ft) tunnel, a bridge over Ljanselva, a 537-metre (1,762 ft) tunnel, a bridge over Vinterveien, and then the rest of the section in a combined concrete and bedrock tunnel to Mortensrud Station.

== Service ==
The Østensjø Line proper is served by Line 3 of the Oslo Metro. On weekdays there are eight trains per hour most of the day. This is reduced to four trains per hour during late evenings, the summer vacation, and weekends. Line 3 runs through the Common Tunnel and continues along the Kolsås Line to Kolsås. Operations of the lines are done by Sporveien T-banen on contract with Ruter, the public transport authority in Oslo and Akershus. The infrastructure itself is owned by Sporveien, a municipal company. Service is provided using MX3000 three- and six-car trains. Travel time from Mortensrud to Brynseng is 17 minutes and from Mortensrud to Stortinget is 27 minutes. The line had 11,643 weekday average boarding passengers in 2002, making it the third-most heavily trafficked of the eastern metro lines.

== History ==
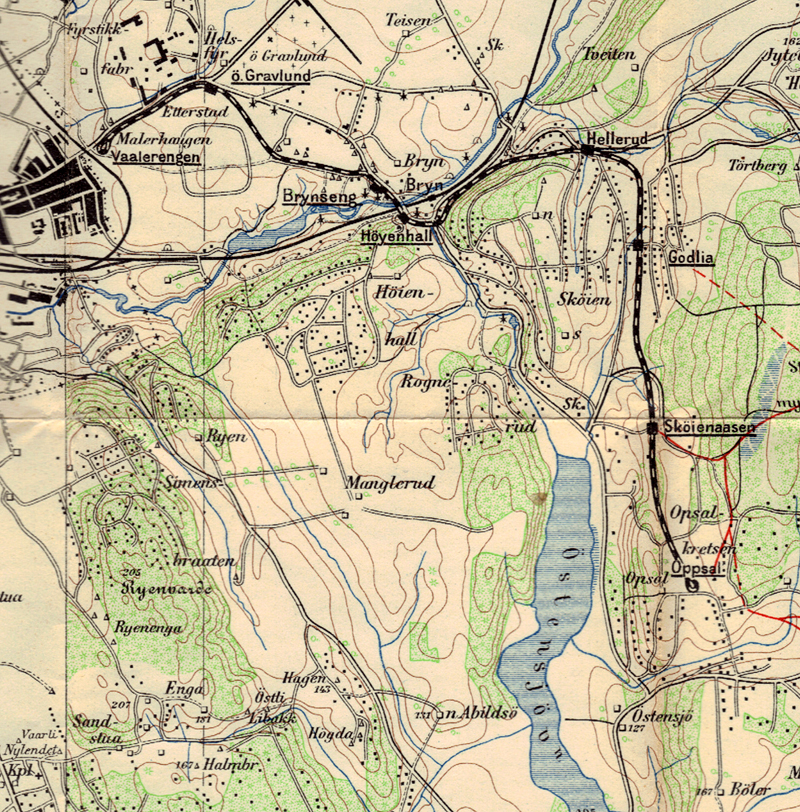
Map of the Østensjø Line from 1928

=== Construction ===
The area around Etterstad was originally connected to the city centre via the Vålerenga Line and then the Gamlebyen Line of the tramway. The Vålerenga Line was built and operated by Kristiania Sporveisselskab (KSS), which had opened the line on 3 May 1900. Proposals for a link from Etterstad towards the Østensjø area were first articulated in 1917. That year Aker Municipality established the municipal tramway company Akersbanerne to build light rails to the Aker suburbs of Oslo. Meanwhile, Aker and Oslo had issued a contest for a network of tramways throughout the urban area. The winning design, made by Jørgen Barth, included a series of suburban lines, including one to Østensjø. This resulted in a municipal urban rail plan that was passed in 1919.

Construction started in February 1922, and by 18 December 1923, construction had come far enough the 1.4-kilometre (0.87 mi) section from Etterstad to Bryn could open. An agreement was made with KSS, where the latter extended its Line 17 from that operated on the Homansbyen Line and the Vålerenga Line. Every other service was extended to Bryn and given the designation 7Ø. The original line was double track from Etterstadgata to the municipal border and single track onwards. It is now known whether there was a balloon loop or not at Bryn. Double track to Bryn was completed in 1925. Services were carried out with Class H trams. The ride cost 15 øre from Vålerenga to Bryn, and 30 øre onwards to the city centre. Trams ran every 24 minutes to Bryn.

=== Tramway operations ===
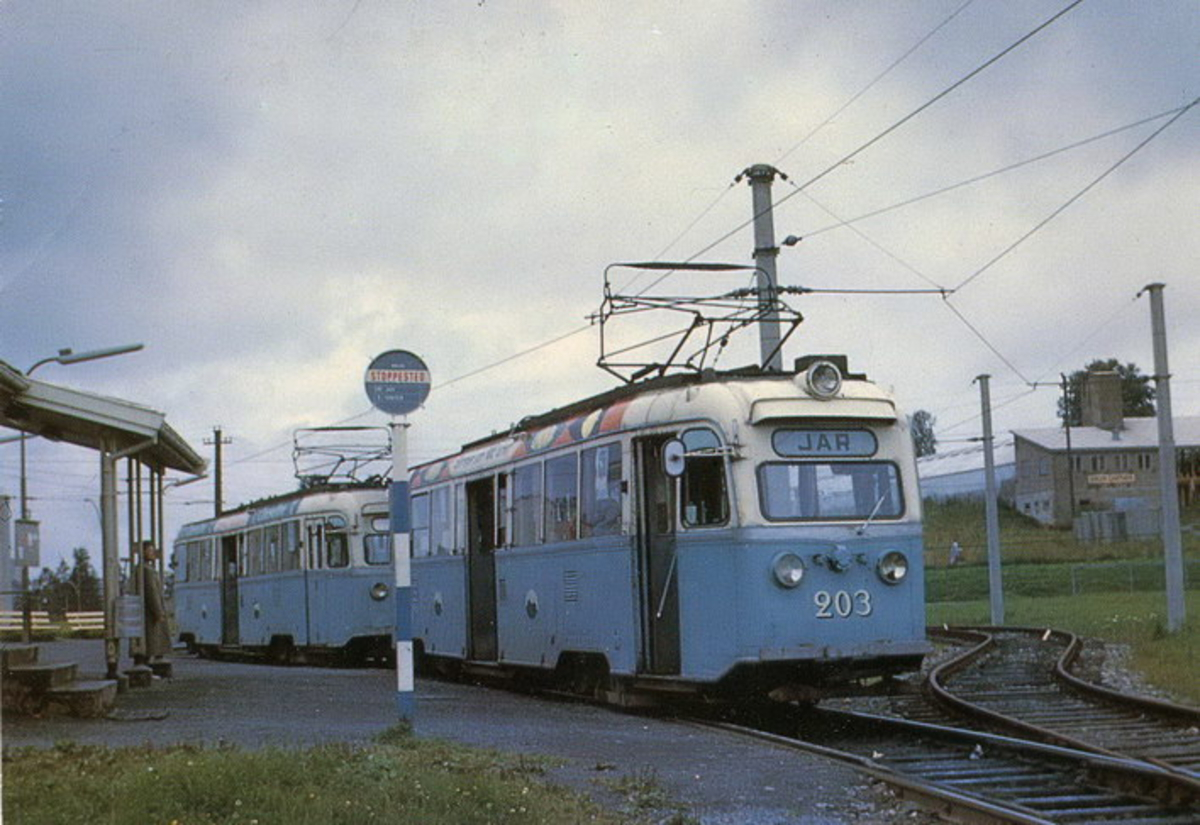
Two Class B trams at Bøler in 1962

Akersbanerne continued construction on the section from Bryn to Oppsal. The original reason for terminating at Bryn had been the prolonged construction of Bryn Bridge across the Trunk Line. The extension to Oppsal was completed in January 1926. By then KSS had been taken over by Oslo Municipality and merged to become Oslo Sporveier. However, the two municipalities and their tram companies could not agree on terms to lease the trackage from Etterstad to the city centre. Part of the problem was the lack of a suitable turning loop with free capacity in the city centre. Instead, Akersbanerne decided to operate the trams to Etterstad, where there would be transfer, without transfer tickets, between the two tram companies. For the operations, Akersbanerne bought four Class A trams and three trailers, which were built by Skabo Jernbanevognfabrikk and delivered in 1926 and 1927. This was not sufficient to operate all the lines, so an addition three trams were leased from Ekebergbanen.

The lack of direct routes to the city centre was not popular among travelers, and a direct bus service from the area around Hellerud was introduced. These was taken over by Akersbanerne in 1928, who subcontracted the operations to De Blå Omnibusser. Later the concession was given to the bus company. New negotiations between the tram companies were carried out, but neither party was willing to make sufficient admittances for agreement to be reached. Akersbanerne merged its operation to the west of the city centre with Holmenkolbanen in 1933, and the Østensjø Line was the only remaining service they operated. Akersbanerne started negotiating with both Ekebergbanen and Bærumsbanen about either of them taking over the route.

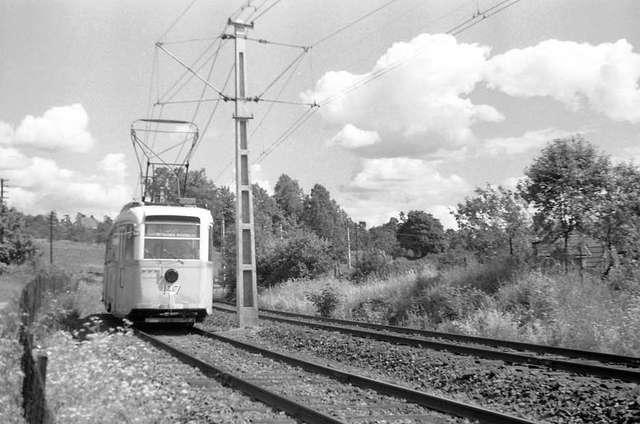
A Class B tram on the Østensjø Line in 1947

Bærumsbanen, that had become partially owned by Oslo Sporveier, had a similar suburban tramway to the west of the city centre, the Lilleaker and Kolsås Lines, where trams continued along street trams lines until they reached the city centre. Also they had a lack of sufficient balloon loops. They turned their trams at Athenæum, and therefore did not serve the important Oslo East Station. An agreement was therefore reached with Bærumsbanen and Oslo Sporveier, where Bærumsbanen would operate a through service from Kolsås to Oppsal, without the need to balloon loops in the city centre. The service started on 4 January 1937 and was branded as the Bærum–Østensjø Line.

Bærumsbanen had a fleet of Class A trams, and these were along with Akersbanerne's units put into use on the combined service. The first Class B trams were delivered to Oslo Sporveier in 1937, and these put into service on the Bærum–Østensjø Line after the serial delivery started in 1939. They aluminum trams were faster and had better comfort, allowing a single tram could replace a Class A tram and trailer. The Kolsås Line was connected to the Common Tunnel from 15 June 1942 and became part of the underground service. The branch from Jar to the city centre was renamed the Lillaker Line and tram service cut short to Jar. The Østensjø Line service thereafter became marketed as the Lilleaker–Østensjø Line. However, a limited number of services continued to Kolsås, Avløs or Haslum.

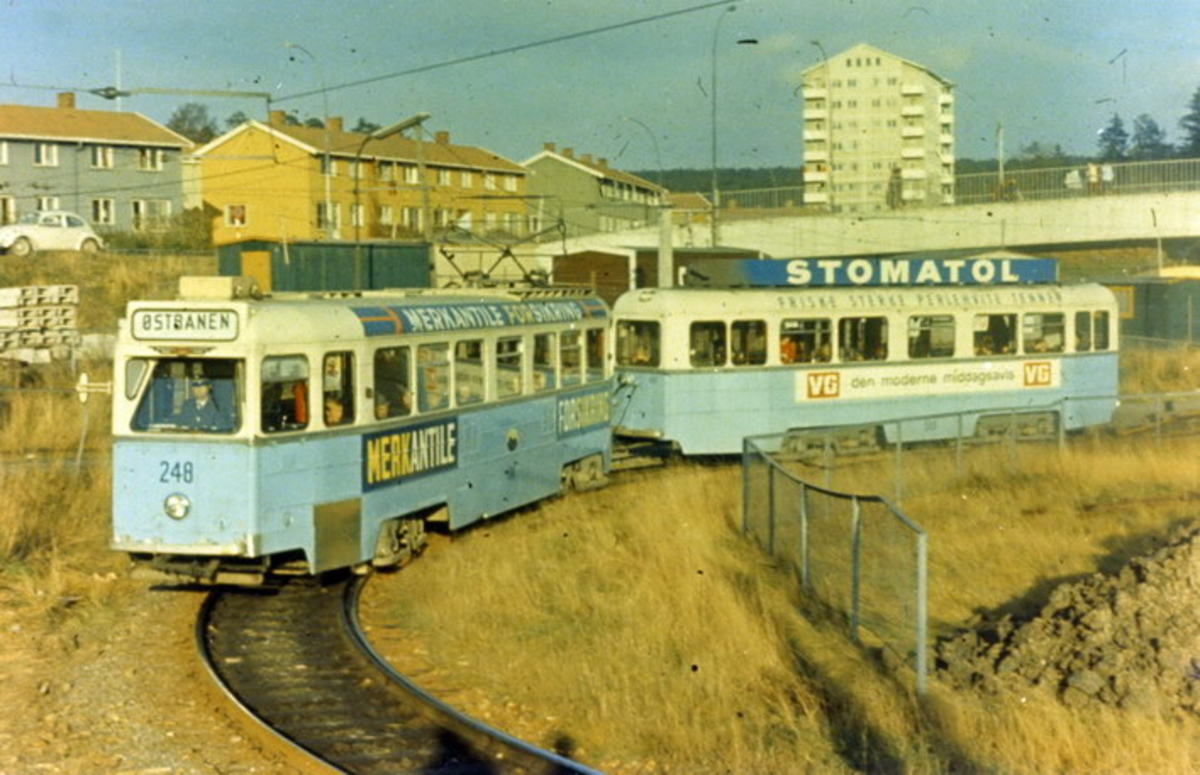
SM53 tram at Bøler in around 1960

From 1944, the operative responsibility for Bærumbanen was taken over by Oslo Sporveier. The Lilleaker–Østensjø Line was then given the service number 9. The municipalities of Oslo and Aker merged in 1948, and the ownership of the Østensjø Line was transferred to Bærumsbanen. The remaining Class A trams were retired between 1946 and 1958 and replaced with Class E, very similar to Class B, but had been built as street trams in 1939. Class B trams were rebuilt from 1955 so they could operate in trains.

=== Conversion to metro ===
Planning of the metro commenced in 1946. An overground system was ruled out because of the increased estimates in traffic and an underground route was instead pursued. This part of the line would need to handle a traffic of 20,000 passengers per hour. Preliminary work on the line planning concluded in 1949 and instead a permanent municipal agency was established, the Planning Office For the Suburban and Underground Lines, on 15 September 1949. Instrumental in the change of magnitude was the change of was a shift in the zoning planning. There was a large housing shortage in Oslo and the region was experiencing rapid population growth. The solution was to build a series of commuter towns in Aker, which would be the basis for the traffic on the metro. Plans for both a metro and new housing were substantiated in a 1950 municipal plan.

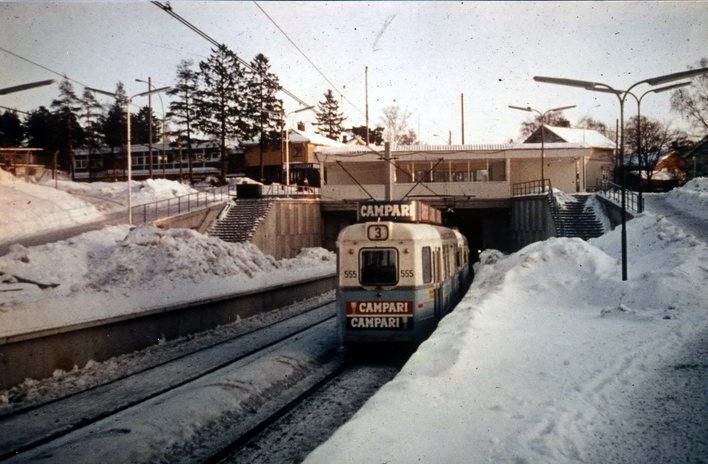
SM53 tram at Oppsal shortly before the conversion to metro

The basics for the metro were established in 1951, with a common segment through Enerhaugen with a terminus at Grønlands torg, to avoid having to cross Akerselva. The plans were made such that in the future the line could be extended to connect to Holmenkolbanen's western underground line at Nationalthatret. Four branches would be built, including the Østensjø Line, would be converted to metro. The conversion and metro were approved by the city council on 9 December 1954. Investments were estimated at 221 million Norwegian krone, including rolling stock, for all four lines. The Østensjø Line would retain its route from Bryn to Oppsal, but it would receive a new section from Bryn to Tøyen, where it would run concurrently with the Lambertseter Line. Construction of the latter started in 1952 and was completed on 28 April 1957, sharing track from Etterstad to Bryn.

The metro project involved a significant extension of the Østensjø Line. The first part of the extension was built as a tramway; work on the 1.4-kilometre (0.87 mi) section to Bøler commenced in 1957. This included construction of the first tunnel on the Østensjø Line and resulted in Oppsal Station being moved. The tracks were rearranged at Brynseng where the Lambertseters Line's inbound track was placed under the Østensjø Line's outbound track to avoid a level crossing. Between Brynseng and Høyenhall a four-track bridge was built over the Trunk Line. The first revenue trams ran to Bøler from 20 July 1958. During parts the 1960s, the Østensjø Line was also served by Line 3.

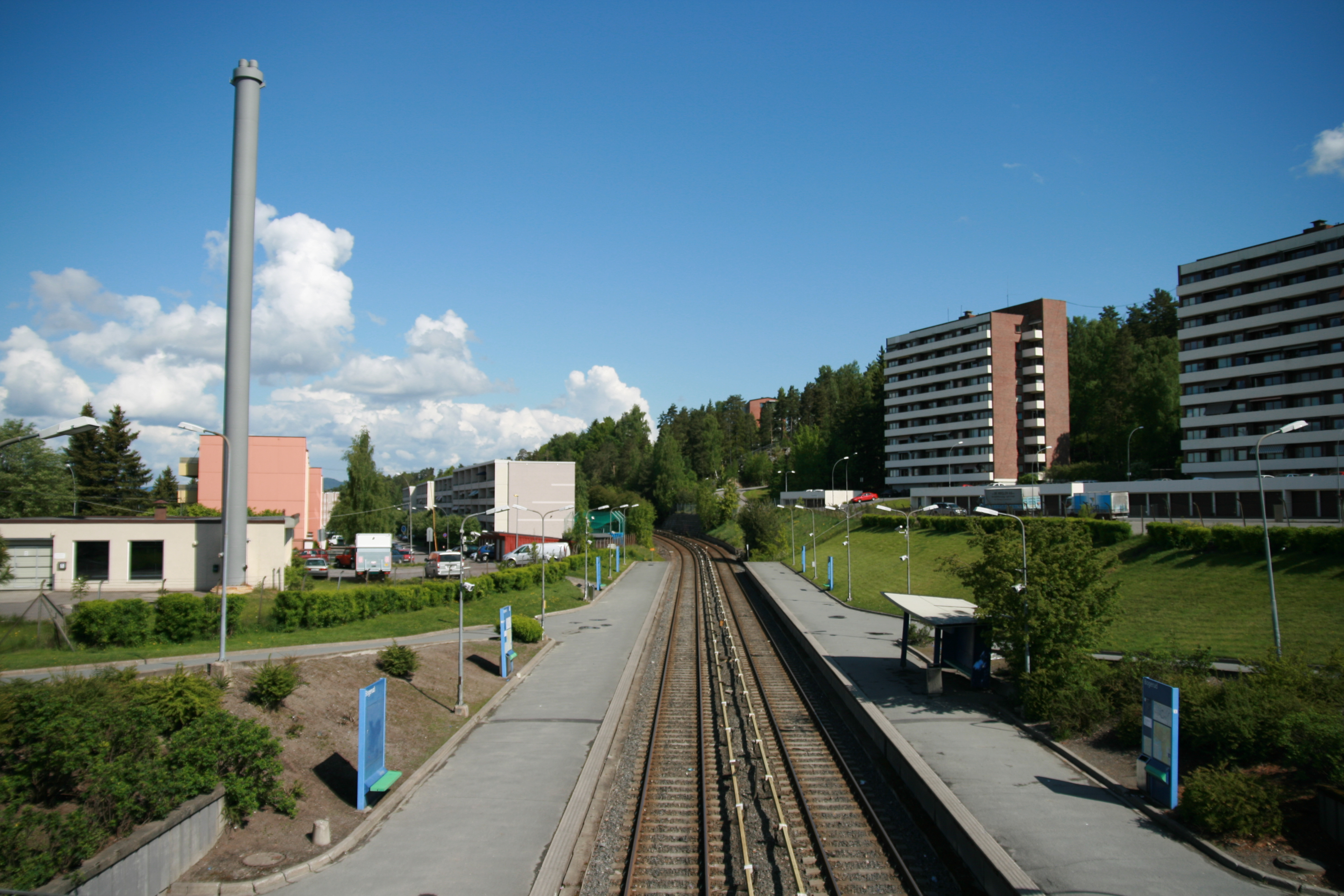
Bogerud opened in 1967 as part of the new metro

The original metro plans had not called for the Østensjø Line to run further than to Bøler. As housing development was gradually forcing its way further south in Nordstrand, the municipal council saw the need for extensions to the line. The section from Bøler to Borgerud was approved on 8 March 1963 and construction started immediately. The section from Borgerud to Skullerud was approved of on 31 January 1964. The total costs of the line from Helsfyr to Skullerud ended at 39 million Norwegian krone.

With the conversion to metro standard, the Østensjø Line was converted to having third rail power supply, the platform height was raised and the platforms lengthened to 110 metres (360 ft) to handle six-car trains. All level crossings were removed. The Lambertseter Line was the first line of the Oslo Metro when it opened on 22 May 1966. Instead of following the Vålerenga Line to the city centre, it instead followed the Common Tunnel from Brynseng to Jernbanetorget. From 19 June 1967 Line 3 stopped being linked with the Lilleaker Line and only ran to Jernbanetorget. The line was closed during the evening of 25 October. From 28 October 1967, the line was connected to the metro and T1000 started being used on the service. The three days were used to remove the balloon loop at Bøler and connect the line to the Common Tunnel. The extension from Bøler to Skullerud opened on 26 November 1967.

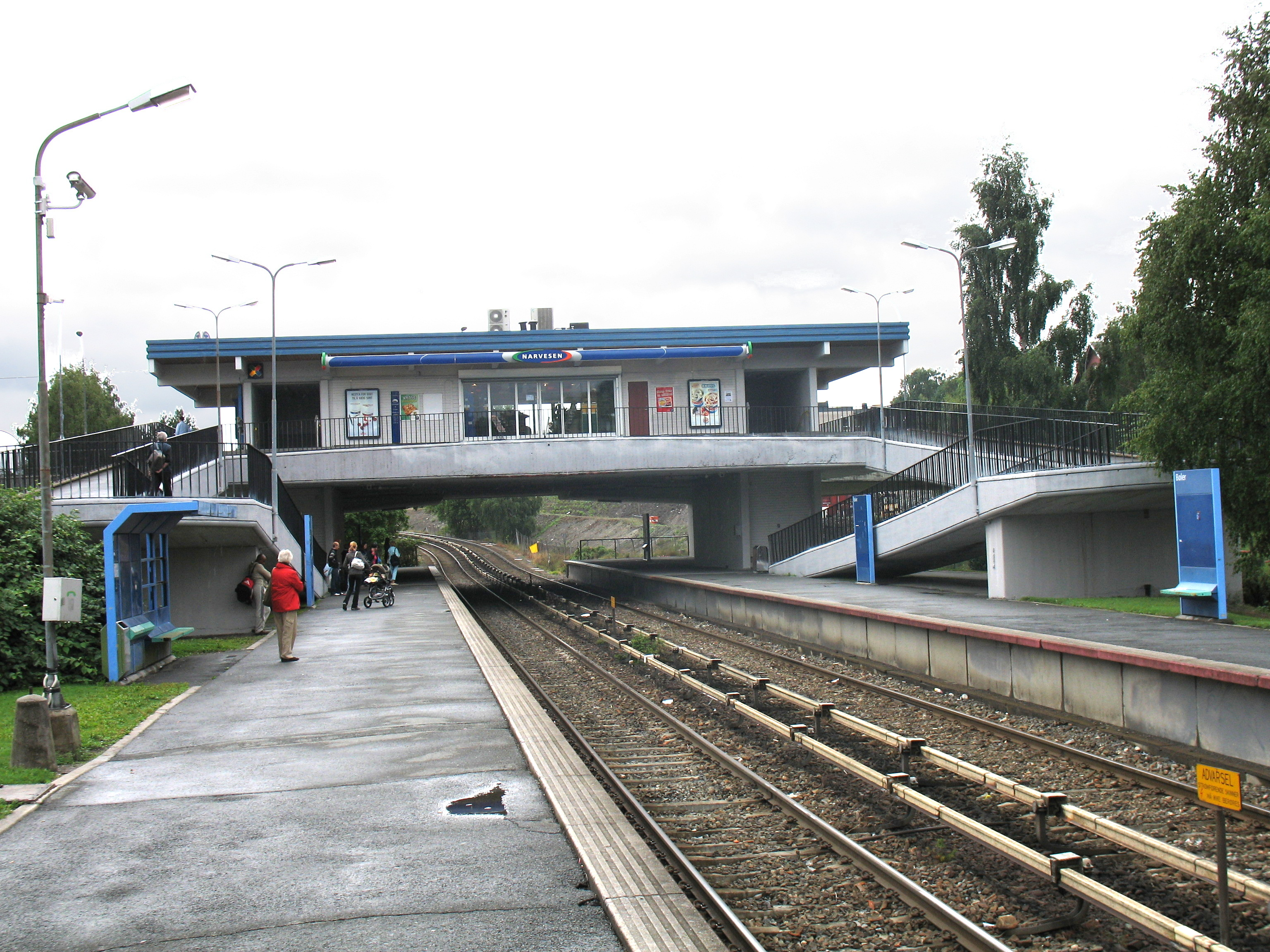
Bøler Station has seen its original ticket office converted to a Narvesen kiosk

=== Metro operations ===
Services on the Østensjø Line were carried out by Line 3, originally running from Skullerud to Jernbanetorget in the city centre. The fourth line of the metro was the Furuset Line. Its initial opening took place on 18 November 1970, when services with Line 6 commenced to Haugerud. The city centre service was extended to Sentrum on 9 January 1977. However, this station was closed from 20 March 1983 to 7 March 1987, and reopened as Stortinget. During the last years of the 1980s the barres and payment stalls were removed and replaced with a proof-of-payment system. This unstaffing of the station allowed for a significant cut in operating costs. The Sognsvann Line was converted to a metro line from 8 April 1995, allowing Line 3 to continue onwards to Ullevål stadion from that date.

The line has received one extension after the metro conversion. Additional housing in the Mortensrud area resulted in plans to a metro connection to the area. Also the Lambertseter Line was considered to be extended to the area, but the Østensjø Line was eventually landed upon. Initial plans called for construction to commence in 1992 and be completed in 1994. However, construction did not start until 1995. The 2.4-kilometre (1.5 mi) extension is built to allow speeds of 100 kilometres per hour (62 mph), and represents a considerable longer distance between stations than what is normal on the network. Most of the section is in tunnels, though there are also two viaducts. The extension, excluding the new station, cost 215 million krone. The station cost 35 million krone. It was taken into use on 24 November 1997, but not officially opened until 4 January 1998.

From 12 April 2003 the Østensjø Line was linked to the Sognsvann Line in such a manner Line 4 ran all the way to Sognsvann. This lasted until 9 December 2012, when it was shifted so that it instead ran along the Ring Line and terminated at Storo. In the meantime the T1000 trains were replaced with MX3000 trains.

The line was closed in April 2015 for extensive maintenance and upgrades. Upon its reopening in April 2016, the weekday daytime frequency increased from four to eight trains per hour. Four trains per hour run through the city centre and connect to the Kolsås Line, while the four other trains only run from Mortensrud to Stortinget and are cancelled during the school summer vacation. The evening and weekend service is four trains per hour, with all trains running the full Mortensrud-Kolsås route.

== Future ==
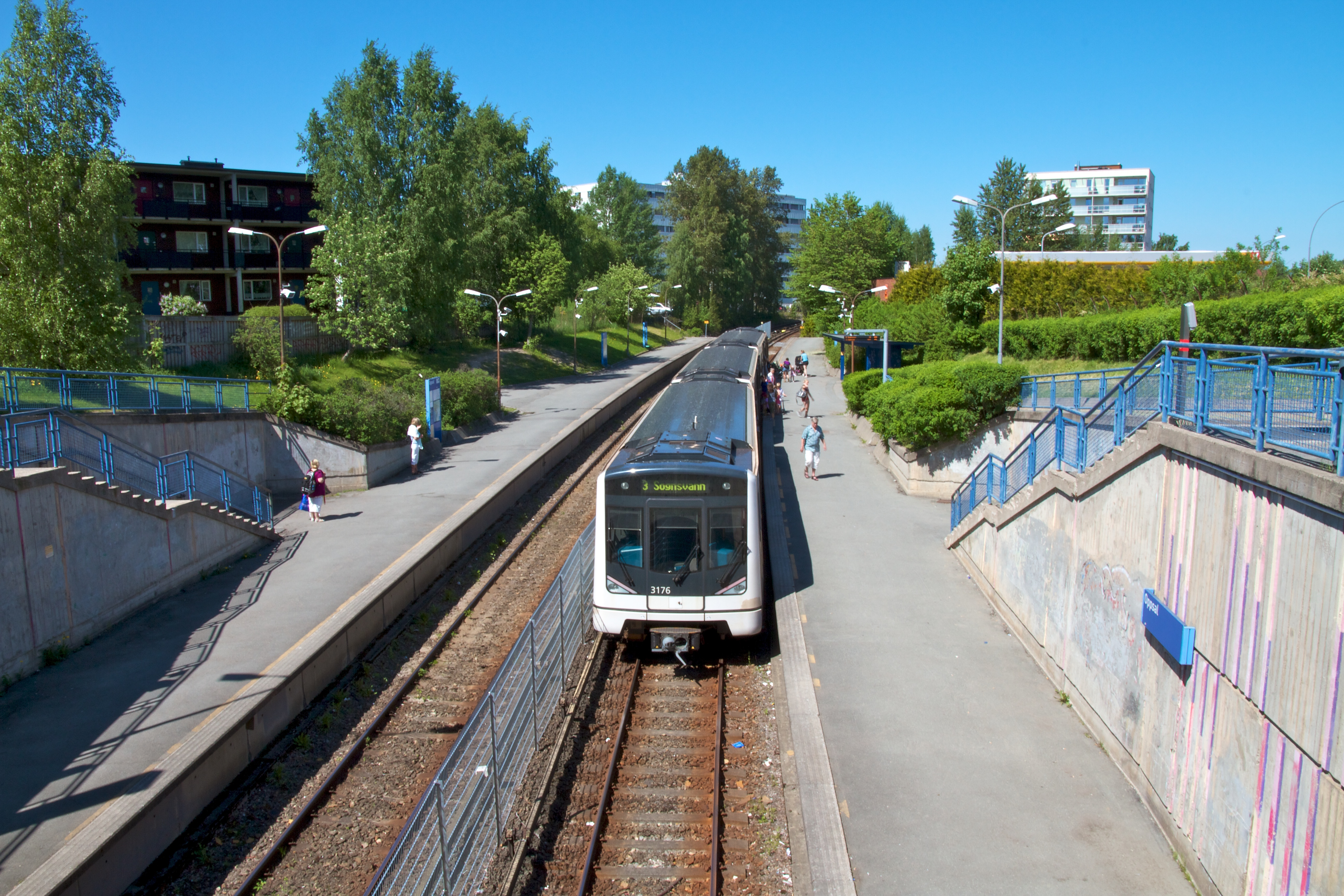
MX3000 train at Oppsal

Ruter has looked into the possibilities of extending a rail-based transit further south in Nordstrand, to serve the existing residential areas of Loftrud and Bjørndal, and the proposed housing areas of Gjersrud and Stensrud. Ruter have suggested either extending the Østensjø Line or the tramway's Ekeberg Line. The metro proposal calls for six new stations, one at Lofthus, 0.7 kilometres (0.43 mi) south of Mortensrud, one at Bjørnholt, 1.7 kilometres (1.1 mi) from Mortensrud, two serving Bjørndal (2.6 and 3.5 km or 1.6 and 2.2 mi), one at Gjersrud (4.4 km or 2.7 mi) and one serving Stensrud (5.3 km or 3.3 mi). Travel time from Mortensrud to Stensrud would be 8 minutes and the proposed terminus would be 32 minutes and 18.3 kilometres (11.4 mi) from Stortinget.

Overall investments would be about 2.1 billion kroner. The extension would receive an estimated 14,000 boarding passengers on an average weekday. Handling of this much increased traffic will minimum require eight trains per hour along the Østensjø Line.

== Bibliography ==
- Aspenberg, Nils Carl (1994). Trikker og forstadsbaner i Oslo (in Norwegian). Oslo: Baneforlaget. ISBN 82-91448-03-5.
- Bjerke, Thor; Holom, Finn (2004). Banedata 2004 (in Norwegian). Hamar / Oslo: Norsk Jernbanemuseum / Norsk Jernbaneklubb. ISBN 82-90286-28-7.
- Haldsrud, Stian (2013). Banen og byen (in Norwegian). Oslo: Storbyforlaget. ISBN 978-82-999426-0-7.
- Ruter (2010). "Banebetjening av Bjørndal og Gjersrud/Stensrud" (PDF) (in Norwegian). Archived (PDF) from the original on 6 June 2014.
