= Tveita (station) =

Oslo metro station

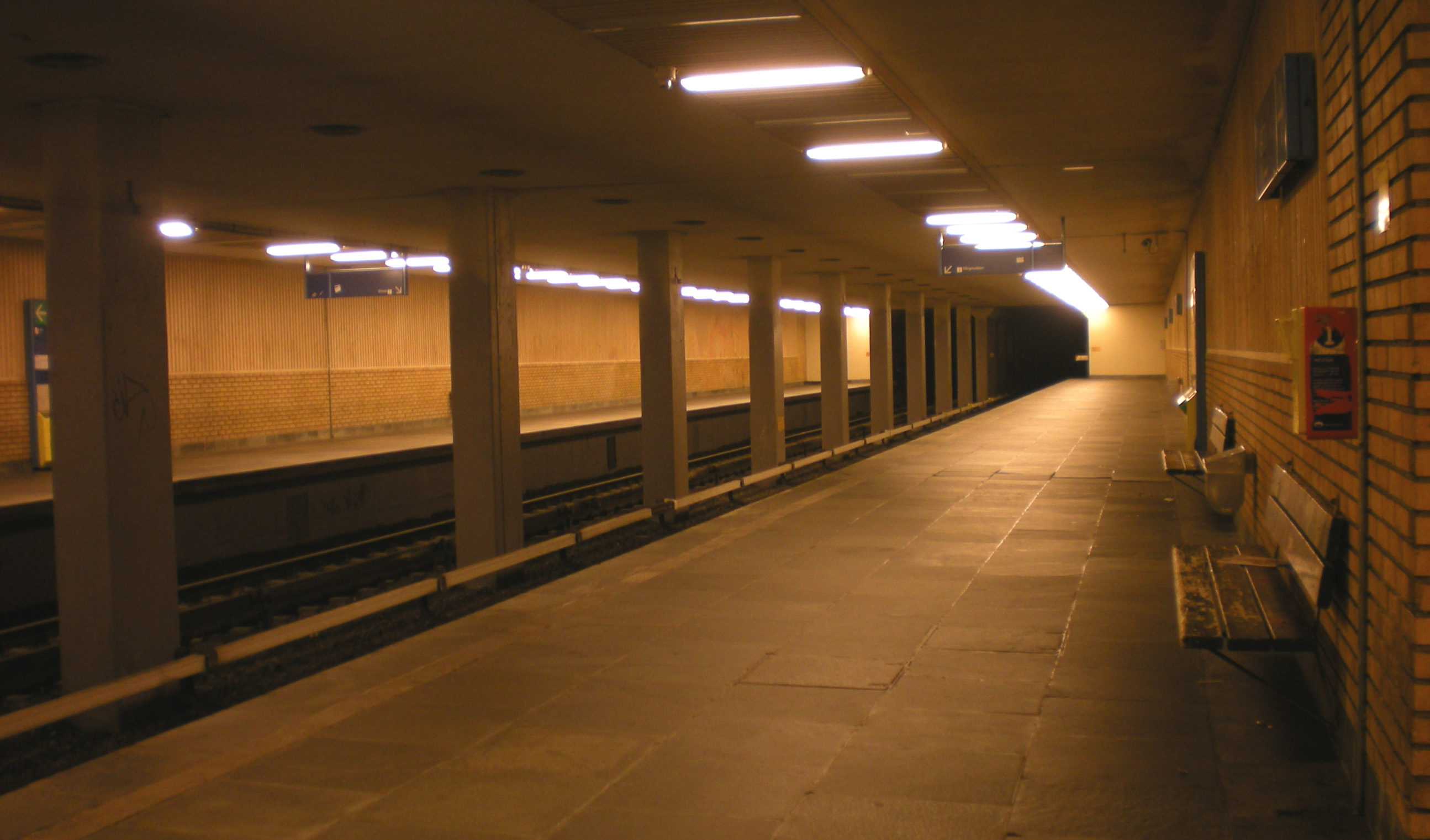

General information
- Location: Tveita, Alna, Oslo; Norway
- Coordinates: 59°54′49″N 10°50′28″E
- Elevation: 163.6 m (537 ft)
- Owner: Sporveien
- Operator: Sporveien T-banen
- Line: Furuset Line
- Distance: 6.4 km (4.0 mi) from Stortinget
- Connections: Bus: 58 Nydalen; 61A Solfjellet; 61B Bøler; 69 Lutvann; 69B Tveita Ring; 76 Helsfyr - Mortensrud; 79 Grorud - Åsbråten; 2N Østerås - Ellingsrudåsen; FB10 OSL-Ekspressen (Mortensrud - Oslo Airport)

Construction
- Structure type: Underground
- Accessible: Yes

History
- Opened: 18 November 1970
Location

Tveita is a subway station on the Furuset Line of the Oslo Metro between Hellerud and Haugerud, located in the Alna borough of Oslo, Norway. The station is the first one on Furusetbanen that is not shared with another line. It was opened as part of the original line in 1970. Tveita is located underneath the shopping centre Tveita senter.

The neighborhood of Tveita is a dense residential area with several large apartment buildings.

Preceding station	Oslo Metro	Following station
Hellerud towards Østerås	Line 2	Haugerud towards Ellingsrudåsen
