= Oppsal (station) =

Oslo metro station

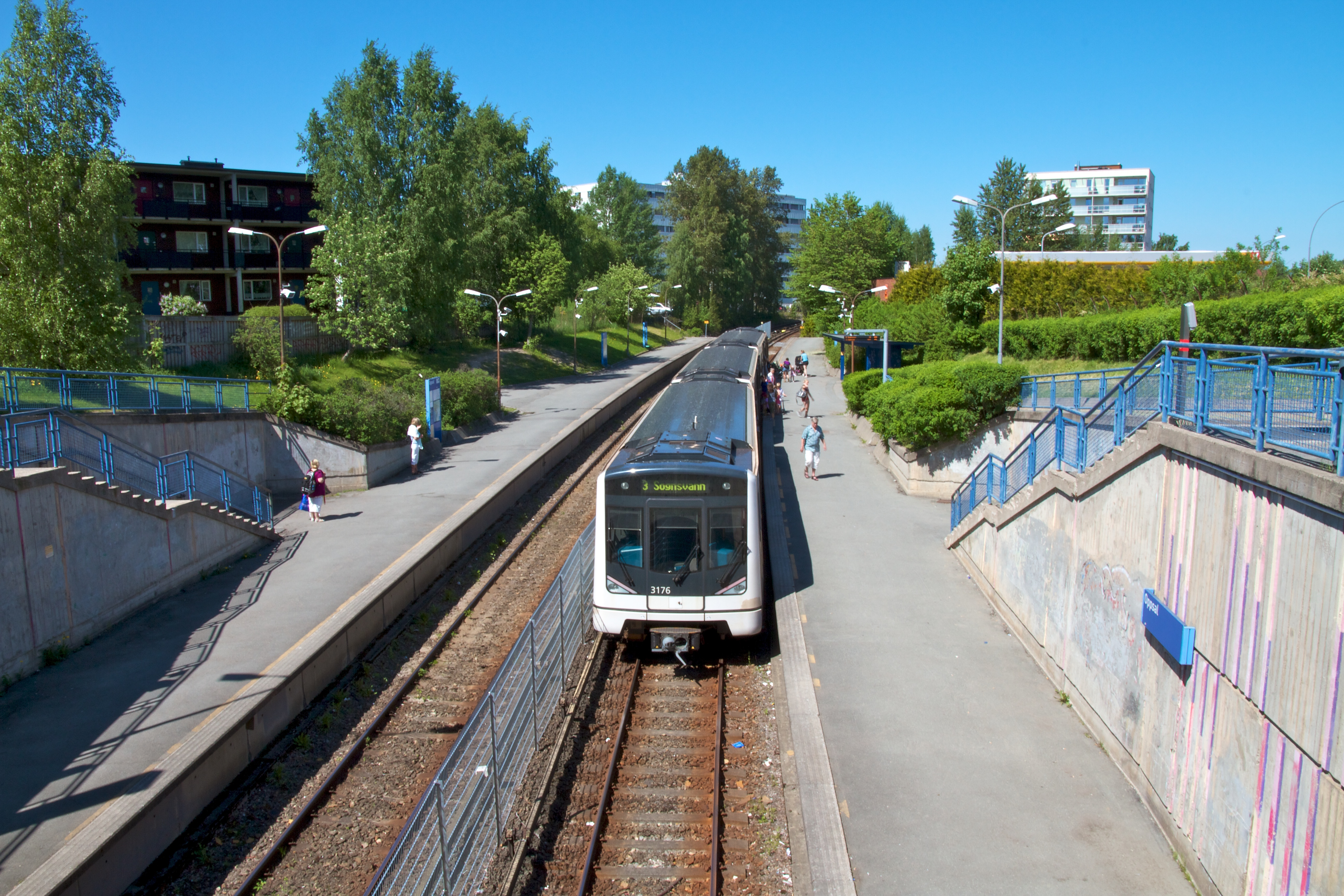

General information
- Location: Oppsal, Oslo; Norway
- Coordinates: 59°53′34″N 10°50′24″E
- Elevation: 152.4 m (500 ft)
- Owner: Sporveien
- Operator: Sporveien T-banen
- Line: Østensjø Line
- Distance: 7.8 km (4.8 mi) from Stortinget

Construction
- Structure type: At-grade
- Accessible: Yes

History
- Opened: 29 October 1967; 58 years ago
Location

Oppsal is a station on the Østensjø Line (line 3) of the Oslo Metro. It is located in the suburb of Oppsal, between the stations of Skøyenåsen and Ulsrud, 7.8 kilometers (4.8 mi) from Stortinget.

== History ==
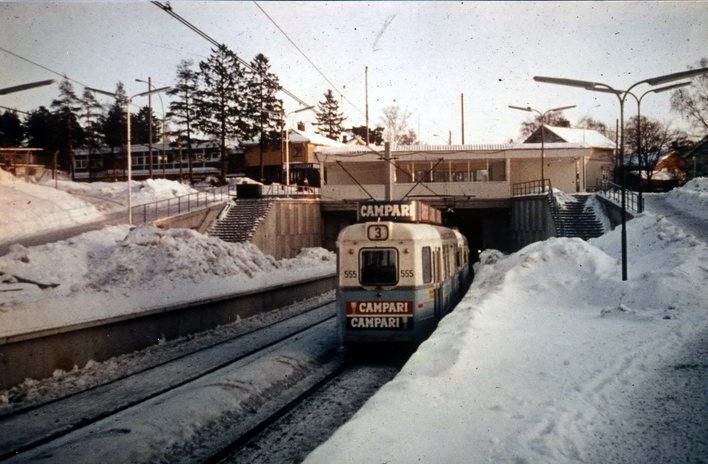
A SM53 tram at Oppsal.

However, rail service through Oppsal is older, having opened as part of a suburban tram line in 1926. It was opened by operator Akersbanerne as part of an extension from Bryn. There was a balloon loop here. It remained the terminus of the Østensjø Line, until 1957, when it was extended to Bøler. The station was opened as a subway station on the 29th of October 1967. P.A.M. Mellbye was the station's architect.

| Preceding station | Oslo Metro | Following station |
|---|---|---|
| Skøyenåsen towards Kolsås | Line 3 | Ulsrud towards Mortensrud |
