= Skullerud (station) =

Oslo metro station

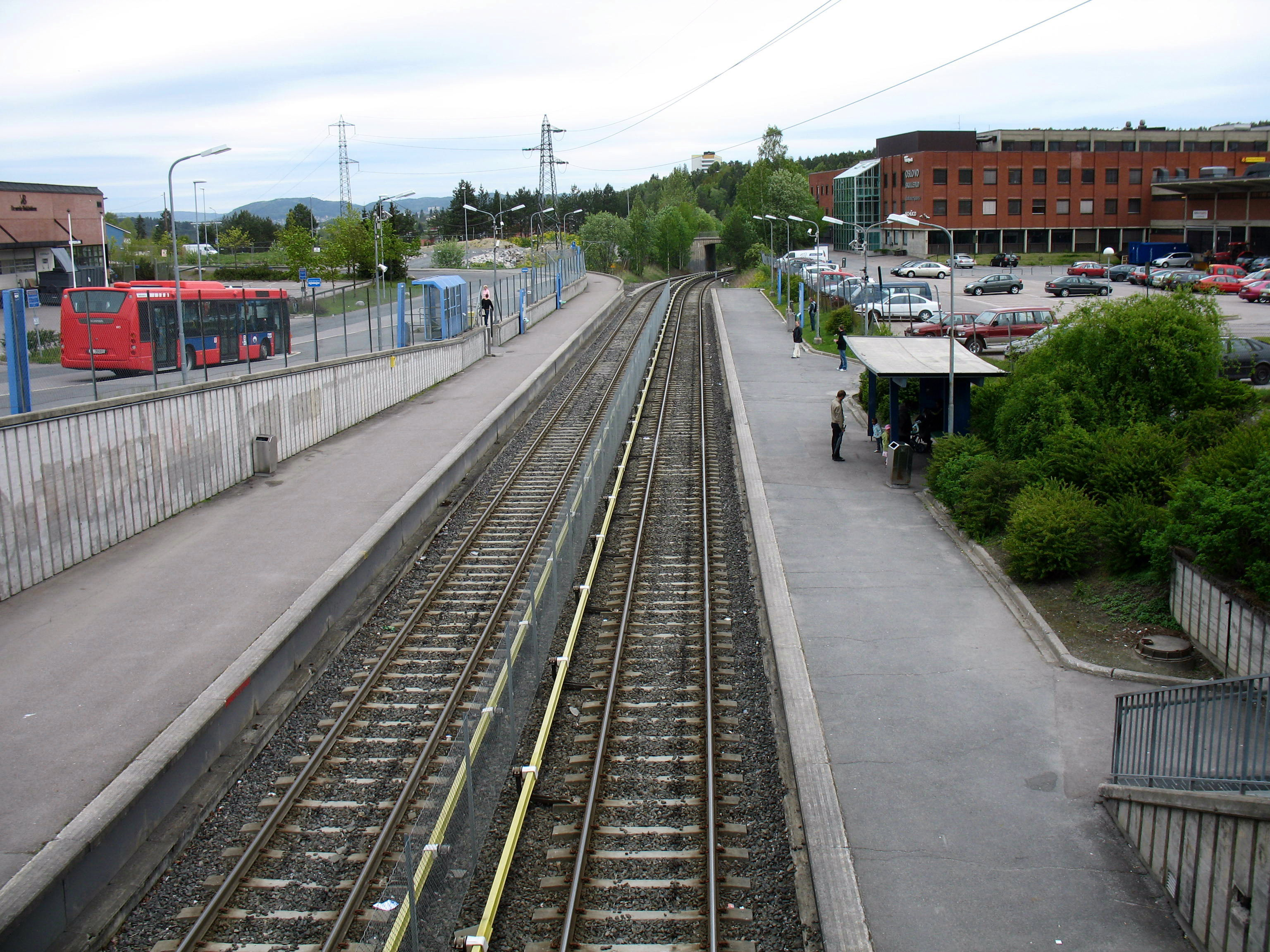

General information
- Location: Østensjø, Oslo; Norway
- Coordinates: 59°51′58″N 10°50′21″E
- Elevation: 133.5 m (438 ft) amsl
- Owner: Sporveien
- Operator: Sporveien T-banen
- Line: Østensjø Line
- Distance: 11.3 km (7.0 mi) from Stortinget
- Connections: Bus: 70 Vestbanen / Vika; 73 Bjørndal (evening rush hour); 73 Jernbanetorget (morning rush); 76 Hvervenbuka; 76 Bøler; 79 Holmlia; 79 Grorud

Construction
- Structure type: At-grade
- Accessible: Yes

History
- Opened: 26 November 1967; 58 years ago
Location

Skullerud is a station on Østensjø Line of the Oslo Metro, located in the Østensjø borough, between Bogerud and Mortensrud. It was opened in 1967 on 26 November. It was the end station of the line until Østensjøbanen was extended to Mortensrud in 1997.

The original station was designed by Helge Abrahamsen and Hans Grinde. It was demolished and a new station was built in 2016.

Preceding station	Oslo Metro	Following station
Bogerud towards Kolsås	Line 3	Mortensrud Terminus
