= Little Pakistan =

Global term for ethnic enclaves primarily populated by overseas Pakistanis

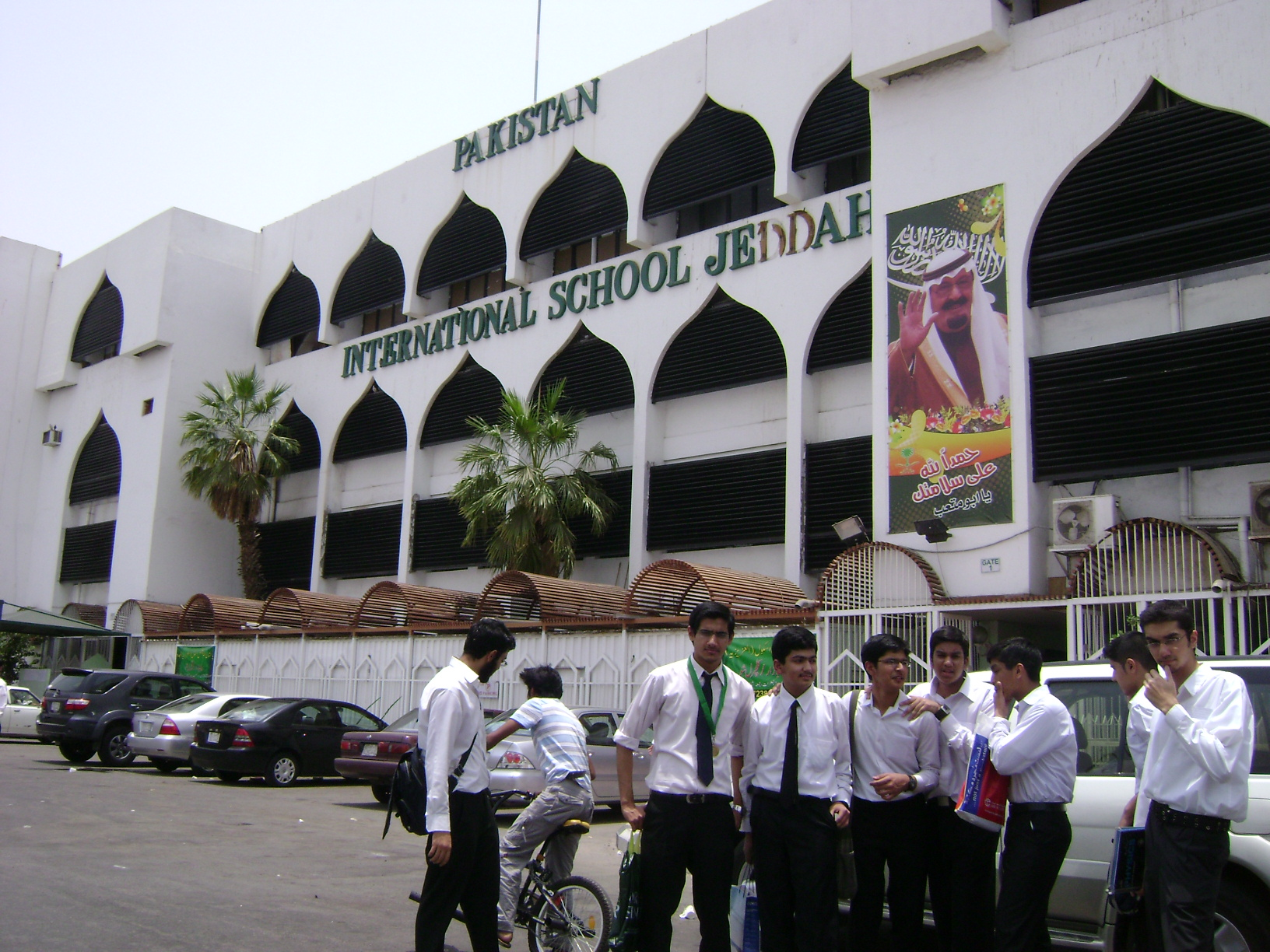
Aziziya, Jeddah is also known as Little Pakistan

Little Pakistan is a general name for an ethnic enclave populated primarily by Pakistani immigrants and people of Pakistani ancestry (overseas Pakistanis), usually in an urban neighborhood all over the world.

== Locations ==
=== Australia ===
- Auburn, Sydney
- Rooty Hill, Sydney

=== Belgium ===
- Rue Brogniez - Brussels
- Ixelles - Brussels

=== Norway ===
- Grønland Street - Oslo - also called "Little Karachi".
- Stovner - Oslo
- Furuset - Oslo
- Bjørndal - Oslo
- Mortensrud - Oslo
- Grorud - Oslo

=== Oman ===
- Muttrah - Muscat

=== Spain ===
- El Raval - Barcelona

=== Saudi Arabia ===
- Aziziya, Jeddah
- Pakistani Ilaka - Al Khobar
- Haara - Riyadh

=== United Arab Emirates ===
- Mohamed Bin Zayed City - Abu Dhabi
- ICAD 1 - Abu Dhabi
- Al Mujarrah - Sharjah
- International City - Dubai
- Al Souk Al Kabir - Dubai

=== United States ===
- Coney Island Avenue - Brooklyn, New York City, New York ("Little Pakistan", Brooklyn)
- Jackson Heights - Queens, New York City, New York (also known as South Hall of New York)
- Hicksville - Nassau County, Long Island, New York
- Valley Stream - Nassau County, Long Island, New York
- Lexington Avenue - Manhattan, New York City, New York
- Oak Tree Road - Edison, New Jersey
- ”Little Karachi” - Paterson, New Jersey
- Irvine - Orange County, California
- Westwood - Los Angeles, California
- Pioneer Boulevard - Artesia, California
- Fremont, California - Known for its large community of Pashtuns
- West Trinity Mills Road - Carrollton, Dallas, Texas
- Hillcroft Avenue - Houston, Texas
- HW-6/ Voss Rd Sugar Land, Houston, Texas
- Devon Avenue - Chicago, Illinois
- Sugarland, Texas (can also be considered as a Little Karachi)

=== Canada ===
- Mississauga, Ontario

=== United Kingdom ===
==== England ====
- Bradford - West Yorkshire
- Curry Mile - Manchester
- Rusholme - Manchester
- Longsight - Manchester
- Cheetham Hill - Manchester
- Glodwick - Oldham
- Alum Rock - Birmingham
- Sparkbrook - Birmingham
- Sparkhill - Birmingham
- Small Heath - Birmingham
- Nether Edge - Sheffield
- Harehills - Leeds
- Wingrove - Newcastle
- Arthurs Hill - Newcastle
- Linthorpe - Middlesbrough
- Normanton - Derby
- Green Street - London
- Ilford - London
- Walthamstow - London
- Southall - London
- Luton - Bedfordshire
- Slough - Berkshire
- High Wycombe - Buckinghamshire
- Darnall - Sheffield
- Burngreave - Sheffield
- Leicester - Leicestershire
- Oldham - Greater Manchester
- Rochdale - Greater Manchester
- Bolton - Greater Manchester
- Keighley - Bradford
- Dewsbury - Kirklees
- Smethwick - Sandwell
- Darlaston - Walsall
- Huddersfield - Kirklees
- Nottingham

==== Scotland ====
- Pollokshields - Glasgow

==== Wales ====
- Grangetown - Cardiff

=== Qatar ===
In Qatar there isn't a specific “Little Pakistan” but rather a “Little South Asia” where South Asian bachelors and families form the majority

- Matar Qadeem
- Najma
