= Hellerud (station) =

Oslo metro station

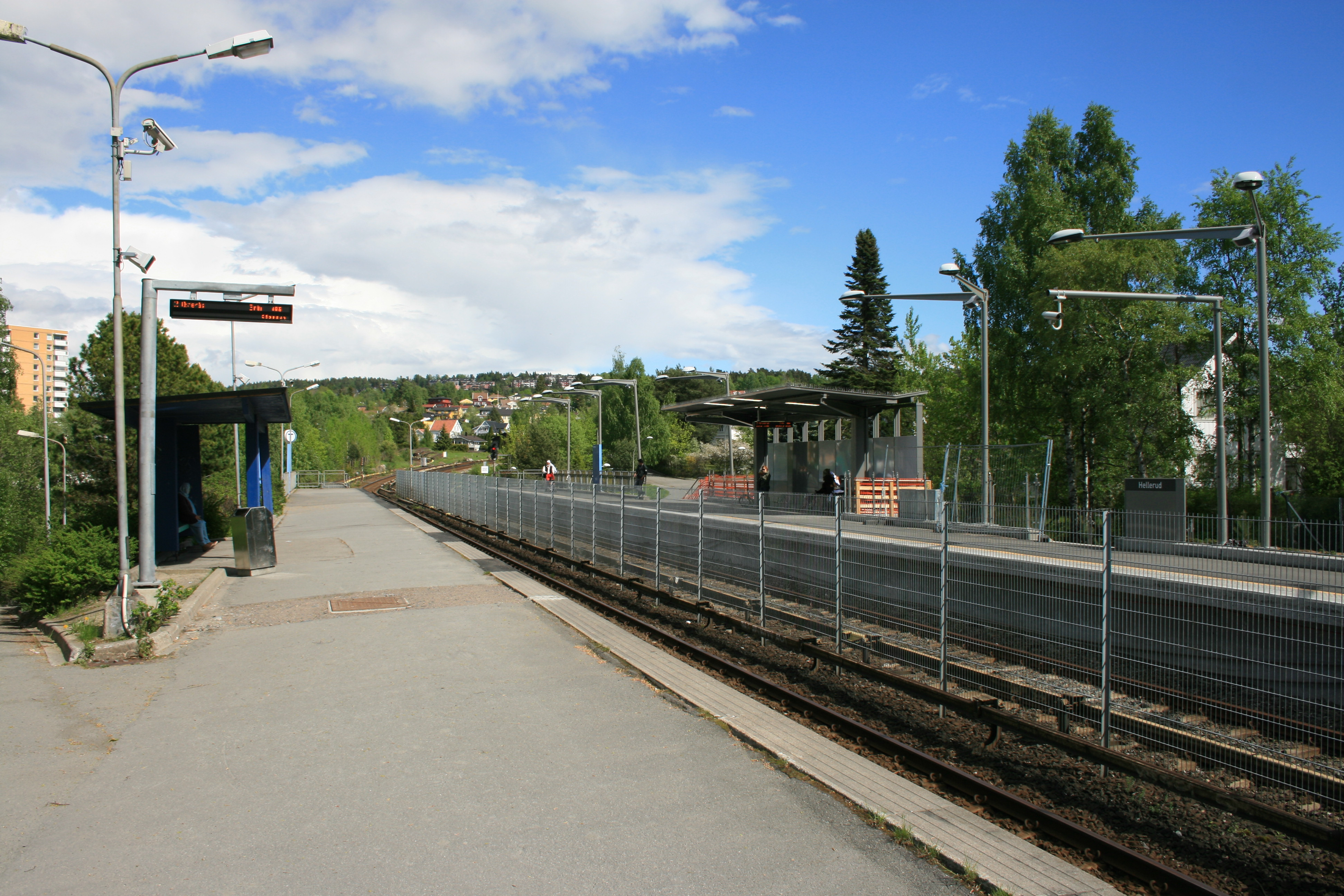

General information
- Location: Hellerud, Oslo; Norway
- Coordinates: 59°54′35″N 10°49′49″E
- Elevation: 120.5 m (395 ft)
- Owner: Sporveien
- Operator: Sporveien T-banen
- Line: Østensjø Line
- Distance: 5.5 km (3.4 mi) from Stortinget

Construction
- Structure type: At-grade
- Accessible: Yes

History
- Opened: 29 October 1967; 58 years ago
Location

Hellerud is a station on the Oslo Metro system which is shared by two lines, line 2 (the Furuset Line) and line 3 (the Østensjø Line). These two lines diverge immediately east of the station with the eastbound Furuset Line track first diverging southwards before running under the Østensjø Line in order to avoid having the main tracks cross each other. The lines share the same track and platforms. The station is located in a mostly residential area, formerly called the Hellerud borough. Apartment buildings located mainly to the north side of the station.

To the south on the Østensjø Line the next station is Godlia, to the north on the Furuset Line the next station is Tveita, and on the inbound line westwards the next station is Brynseng. The station was opened 29 October 1967 as part of the Østensjø Line, with the line to Furuset coming three years later. Karl Stenersen was the station's architect.

Preceding station	Oslo Metro	Following station
Brynseng towards Østerås	Line 2	Tveita towards Ellingsrudåsen
Brynseng towards Kolsås	Line 3	Godlia towards Mortensrud
