= Skøyenåsen (station) =

Oslo metro station

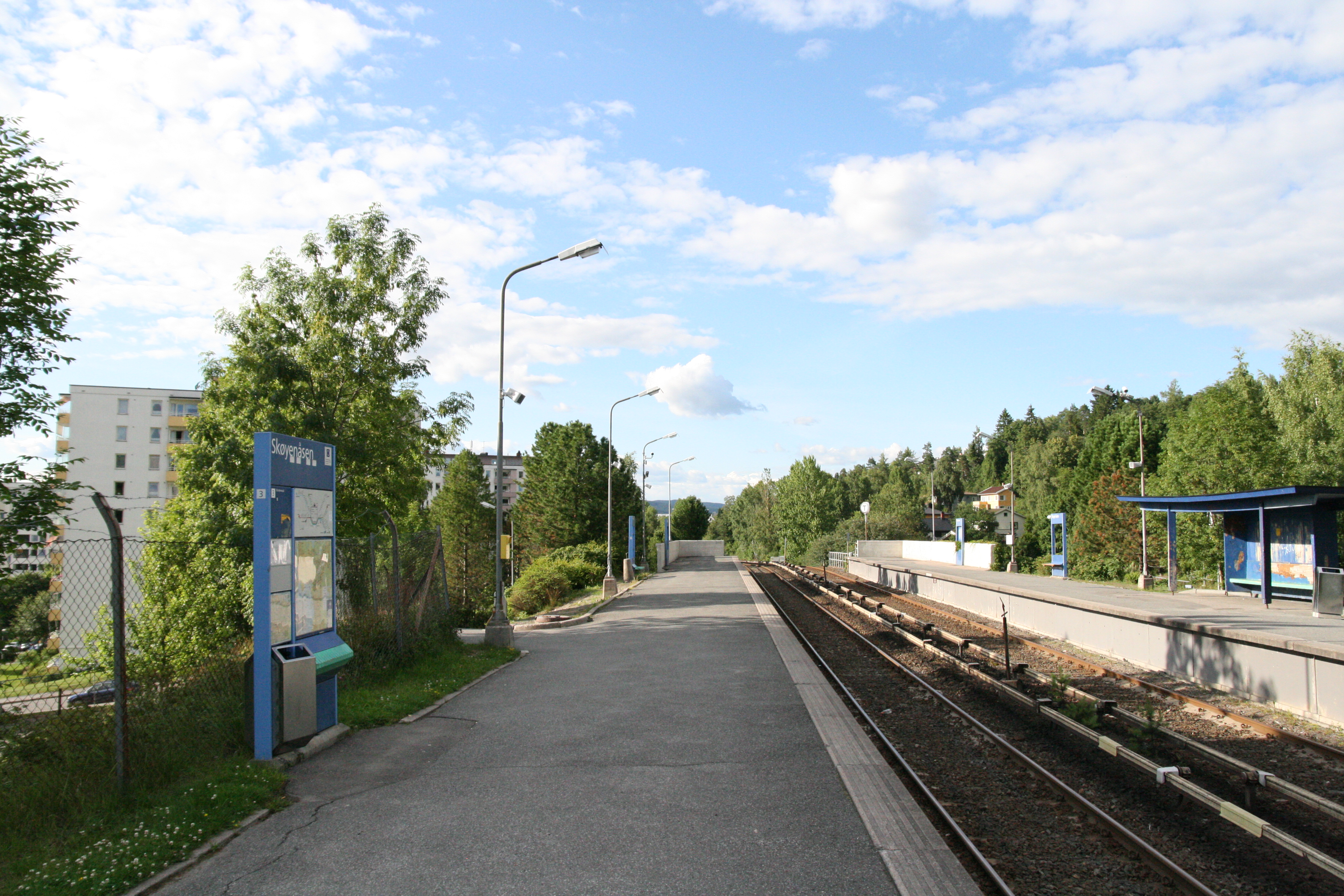

General information
- Location: Østensjø, Oslo; Norway
- Coordinates: 59°53′55″N 10°50′11″E
- Owner: Sporveien
- Operator: Sporveien T-banen
- Line: Østensjø Line
- Distance: 7.0 km (4.3 mi) from Stortinget

Construction
- Structure type: At-grade
- Accessible: Yes

History
- Opened: 29 October 1967; 58 years ago
Location

Skøyenåsen is a station on the Østensjø Line (Line 3) on the Oslo Metro, located between the stations of Godlia and Oppsal, 7.0 kilometers (4.3 mi) from Stortinget. The station was opened as a subway station 29 October 1967. Karl Stenersen was the station's architect. Rail service through Godlia is older, having opened as a tram line already in 1926.

Preceding station	Oslo Metro	Following station
Godlia towards Kolsås	Line 3	Oppsal towards Mortensrud
