= Bogerud (station) =

Oslo metro station

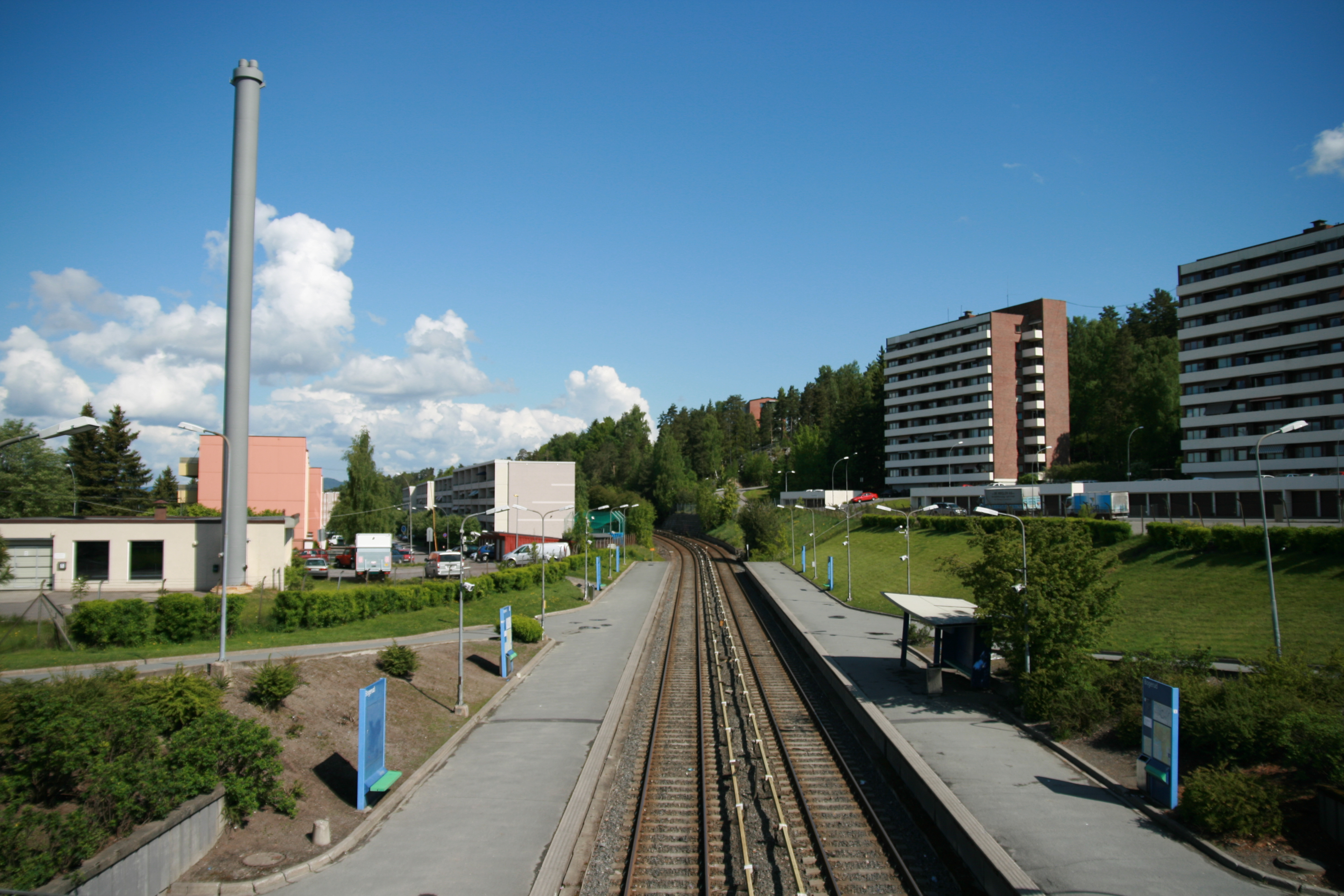

General information
- Location: Bogerud, Oslo; Norway
- Coordinates: 59°52′31″N 10°50′31″E
- Owner: Sporveien
- Operator: Sporveien T-banen
- Line: Østensjø Line
- Distance: 10.2 km (6.3 mi) from Stortinget

Construction
- Structure type: At-grade
- Accessible: Yes

History
- Opened: 26 November 1967; 58 years ago
Location

Bogerud is a station on Østensjø Line (line 3) of the Oslo Metro. The station is located between Bøler and Skullerud, 10.2 kilometers (6.3 mi) from Stortinget. The station was opened 26 November 1967. Helge Abrahamsen was the station's architect.

The Bogerud neighborhood is a residential area, developed mostly during the 1960s. Bogerud station was the scene of a murder in 2002.

Preceding station	Oslo Metro	Following station
Bøler towards Kolsås	Line 3	Skullerud towards Mortensrud
