= Ulsrud (station) =

Oslo metro station

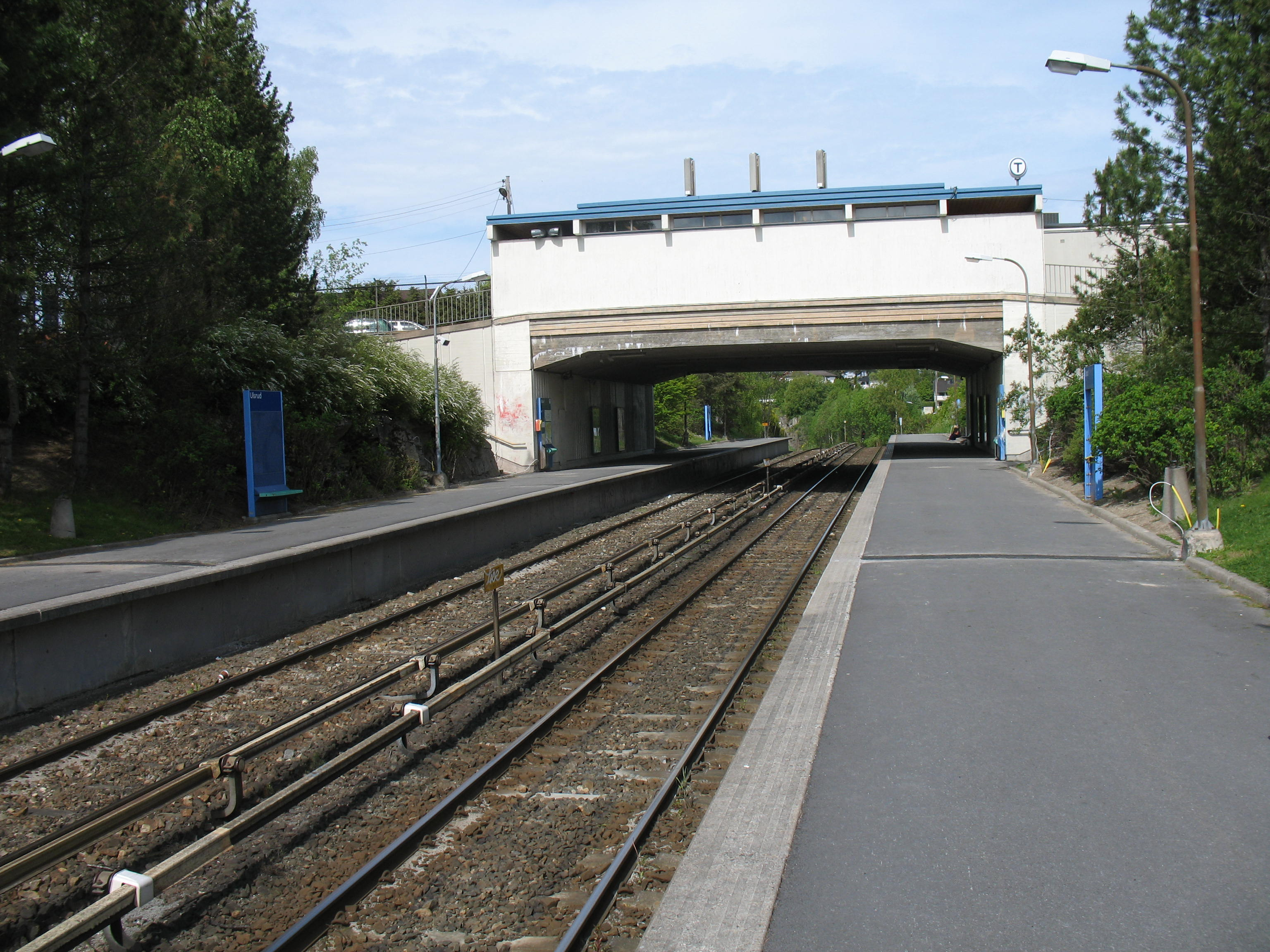
- Ulsrud station in May 2007

General information
- Location: Oslo; Norway
- Coordinates: 59°53′23″N 10°50′58″E
- Elevation: 152.4 m (500 ft)
- Owner: Sporveien
- Operator: Sporveien T-banen
- Line: Østensjø Line
- Distance: 7.8 km (4.8 mi) from Stortinget

Construction
- Structure type: At-grade
- Accessible: Yes

History
- Opened: 29 October 1967; 58 years ago
Location

Ulsrud is a station on the Østensjø Line (Line 3) on the Oslo Metro, located between the stations of Oppsal and Bøler, 7.8 kilometers (4.8 mi) from Stortinget. The station was opened as a subway station 29 October 1967. P.A.M. Mellbye was the station's architect.

Preceding station	Oslo Metro	Following station
Oppsal towards Kolsås	Line 3	Bøler towards Mortensrud
