= Godlia (station) =

Oslo metro station

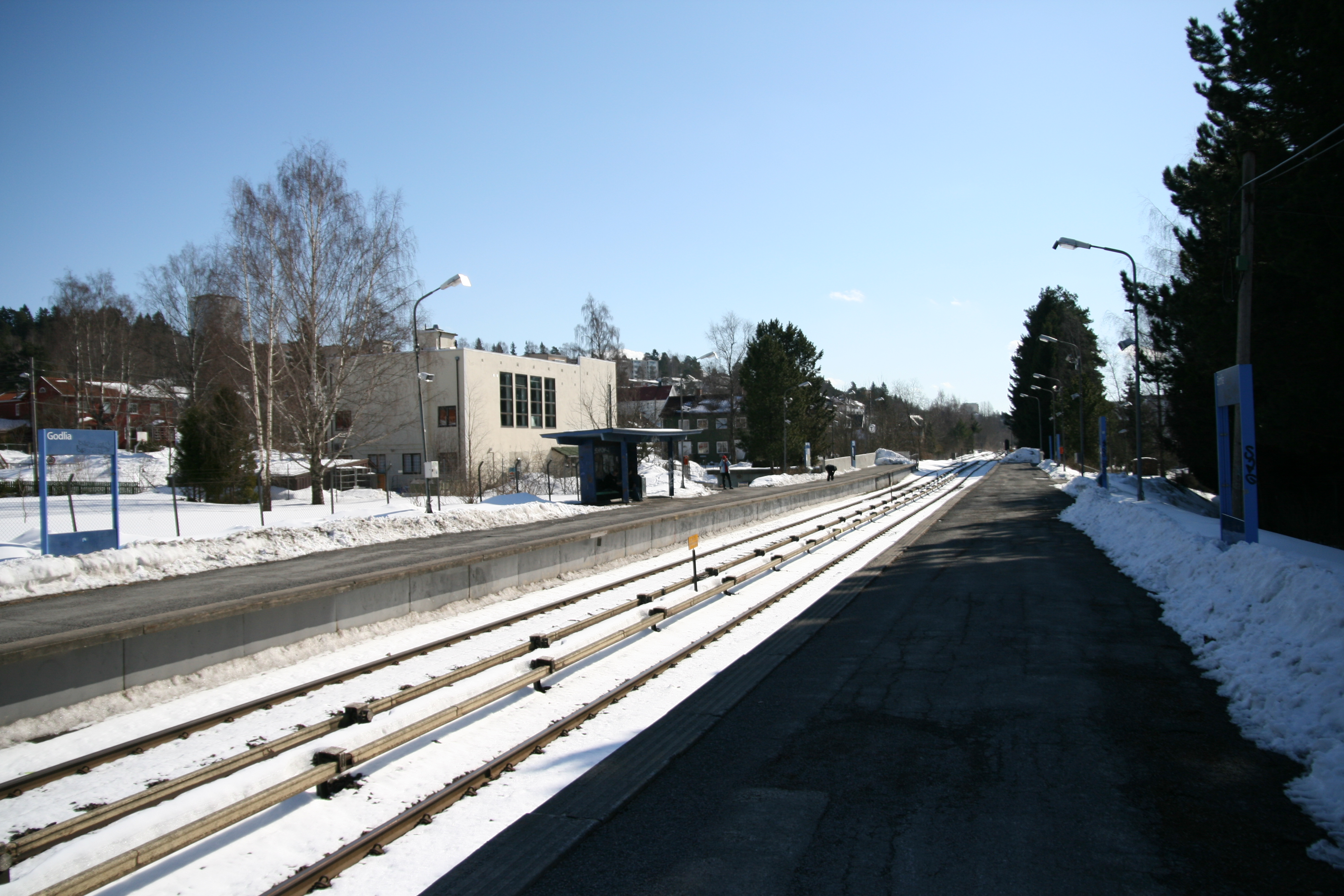

General information
- Location: Østensjø, Oslo; Norway
- Coordinates: 59°54′29″N 10°50′7″E
- Owner: Sporveien
- Operator: Sporveien T-banen
- Line: Østensjø Line
- Distance: 6.1 km (3.8 mi) from Stortinget

Construction
- Structure type: At-grade
- Accessible: Yes

History
- Opened: 29 October 1967; 58 years ago
Location

Godlia is a station on the Østensjø Line (Line 3) on the Oslo Metro. It is the first station after the line diverges from the Furuset Line and is located between the stations of Hellerud and Skøyenåsen, 6.1 kilometers (3.8 mi) from Stortinget. The station was opened as a subway station 29 October 1967. Karl Stenersen was the station's architect. Rail service through Godlia is older, having opened as a tram line already in 1926.

Access to the station is from Godliaveien which passes below the line immediately south of the station. The neighborhood around the station is mainly residential, with several detached houses.

Preceding station	Oslo Metro	Following station
Hellerud towards Kolsås	Line 3	Skøyenåsen towards Mortensrud
