= Stensrud =

Stensrud is a surname of Norwegian origin. Notable people with the surname include:

- Abel Stensrud (born 2002), Norwegian footballer
- David Stensrud (born 1961), American atmospheric scientist
- Einar Stensrud (1895–1964), Norwegian sports wrestler
- Henning Stensrud (born 1977), Norwegian ski jumper
- Ingrid Stensrud (born 1986), Norwegian curler
- Kirk Stensrud (born 1962), Minnesota politician
- Kristoffer Stensrud (1953–2021), Norwegian financial services executive
- Mike Stensrud (1956–2024), American football player
- Øyvind Alfred Stensrud (1887–1956), Norwegian politician
- Torgeir Stensrud (1949–2015), Norwegian businessman
- Wenche Halvorsen Stensrud (born 1954), Norwegian handball player
