= Bøler (station) =

Oslo metro station

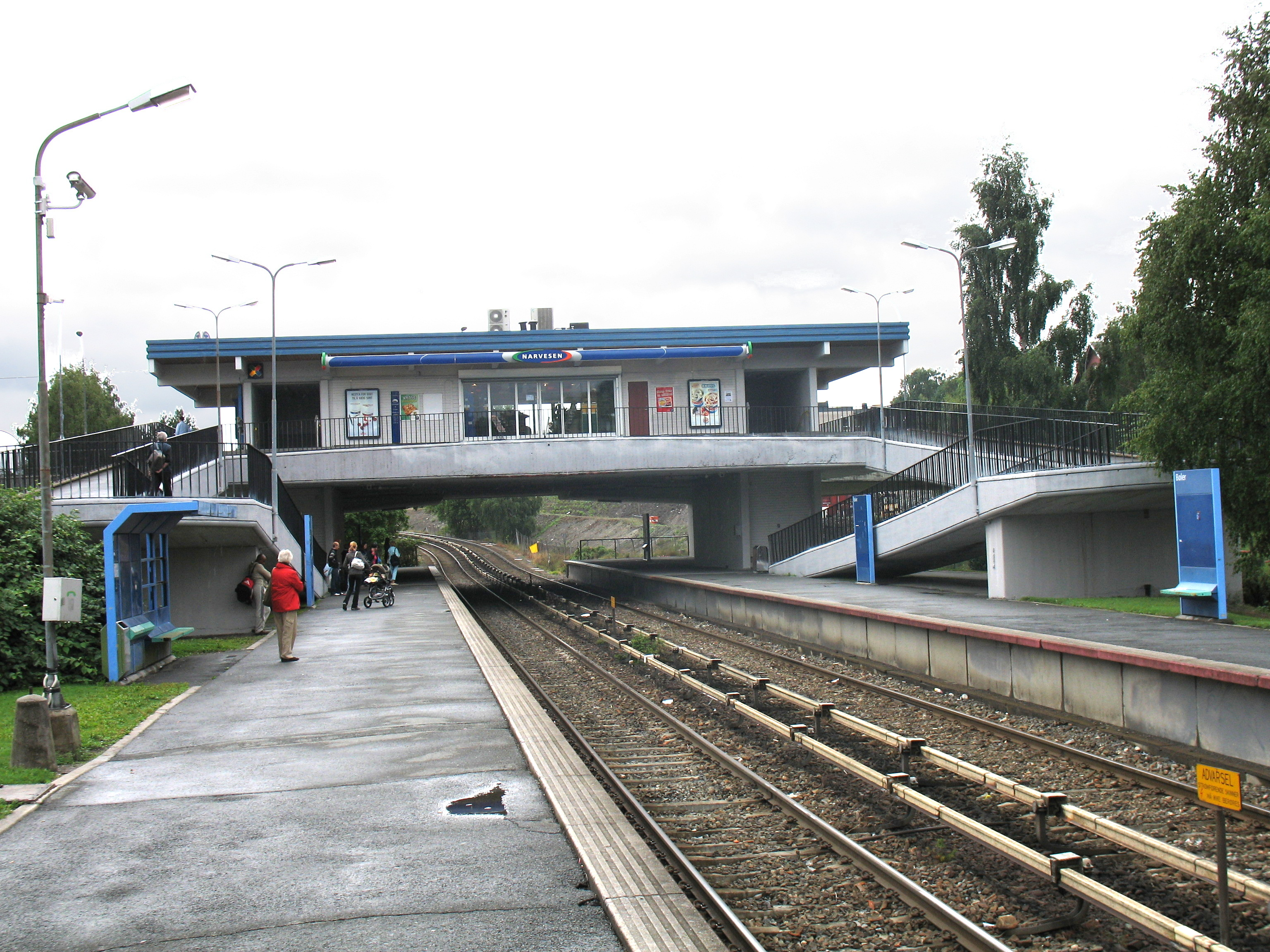

General information
- Location: Bøler, Oslo; Norway
- Coordinates: 59°53′1″N 10°50′34″E
- Elevation: 150.4 m (493 ft)
- Owner: Sporveien
- Operator: Sporveien T-banen
- Line: Østensjø Line
- Distance: 9.2 km (5.7 mi) from Stortinget
- Connections: Bus: 76 Hvervenbukta; 76 Helsfyr; 79 Holmlia; 79 Grorud

Construction
- Structure type: At-grade
- Accessible: Yes

History
- Opened: 29 October 1967; 58 years ago
Location

Bøler is a station on Østensjø Line (Line 3) on Norway's Oslo Metro system between the stations of Ulsrud and Bogerud, 9.2 kilometers (5.7 mi) from Stortinget, in the area of the same name. The station opened as a subway station on 29 October 1967, but rail service to Bøler started already in 1958 as part of the city's tram network.

The Bøler neighborhood is residential which was developed as a suburb during the late 1950s and 1960s. The old farm at Bøler lies next to the station and is preserved. The station itself has the common layout of two side platforms. The road Utmarkveien passes directly above the station by means of a road bridge. Criticism has been raised over the station's dilapidated condition, but funds for renovation went to other subway stations in 2005.

Preceding station	Oslo Metro	Following station
Ulsrud towards Kolsås	Line 3	Bogerud towards Mortensrud
