= Mortensrud =

Neighborhood in Oslo, Norway

Coordinates: 59°50′57″N 10°49′40″E

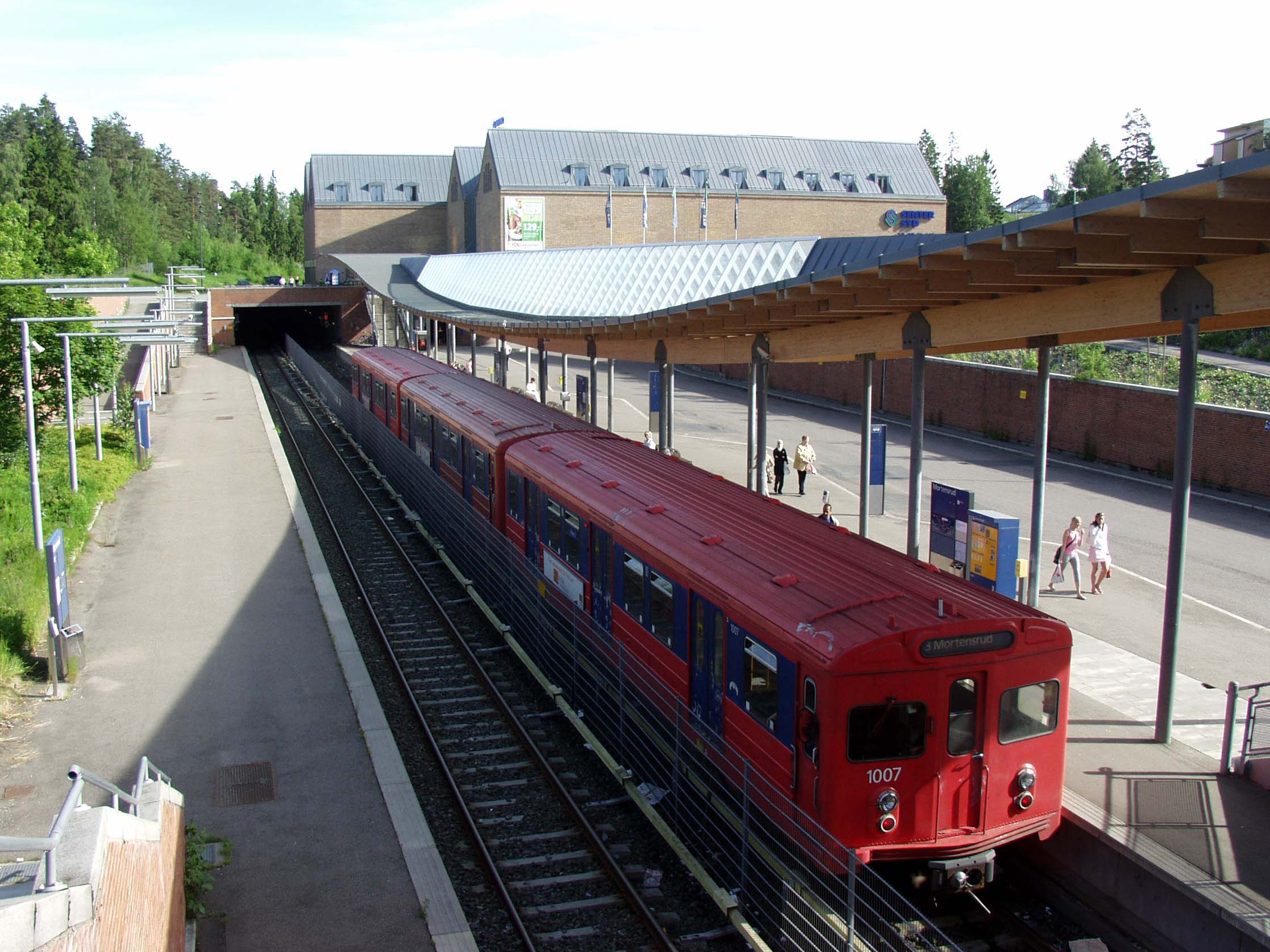
The rapid transit station at Mortensrud (2005)

Mortensrud is a neighborhood in the borough of Søndre Nordstrand, in Oslo, Norway. The area has two primary schools, Mortensrud and Stenbråten, and a lower secondary school, Lofsrud. The area is served by the rapid transit station Mortensrud.

The area is notable for the modern award-winning church, Mortensrud church.
