= Bjørndal =

Suburb of Oslo, Norway

Coordinates: 59°49′31.62″N 10°50′17.16″E

Bjørndal is a suburb of Oslo, Norway, part of the borough of Søndre Nordstrand. Its population is estimated to be about 9,900 residents. Bjørndal has two primary schools, respectively named "Bjørndal skole" and "Seterbråten skole", a middle school named "Bjørnholt Ungdomsskole" and a high school named "Bjørnholt videregående skole". This school is also known to arrange an entrepreneur camp each year. There are also several private and public kindergartens in the area.

Bjørndal is characterized by much development and has a very good sports environment. Bjørndal Idrettsforening has a lot of equipment that can be allocated free for children and young people who want to borrow. Their sports park includes four football pitches, two tennis courts, and a half-pipe, and much more.

Bjørndal is a young suburb where the construction began in 1983. The housing is dominated by terraced houses and detached houses, villas, and blocks. The suburb is located on the west side of the E6 (or on the right side when driving south from the center of Oslo).

Stores in Bjørndal are "Coop Prix", which is a supermarket store with mail service, a Turkish grocery store, a building supply store named "Orring byggsenter" which recently changed name into "Montér", and there are two fast food restaurants. There are also located a medical practice senter and a dental office which offer medical services to all of Bjørndal's residents.

Bjørndal can be reached by bus line number 71A, 71B, 77 and 70N, and are within the ordinary Oslo- rates.

.
