= Mortensrud station =

Oslo metro station

Mortensrud
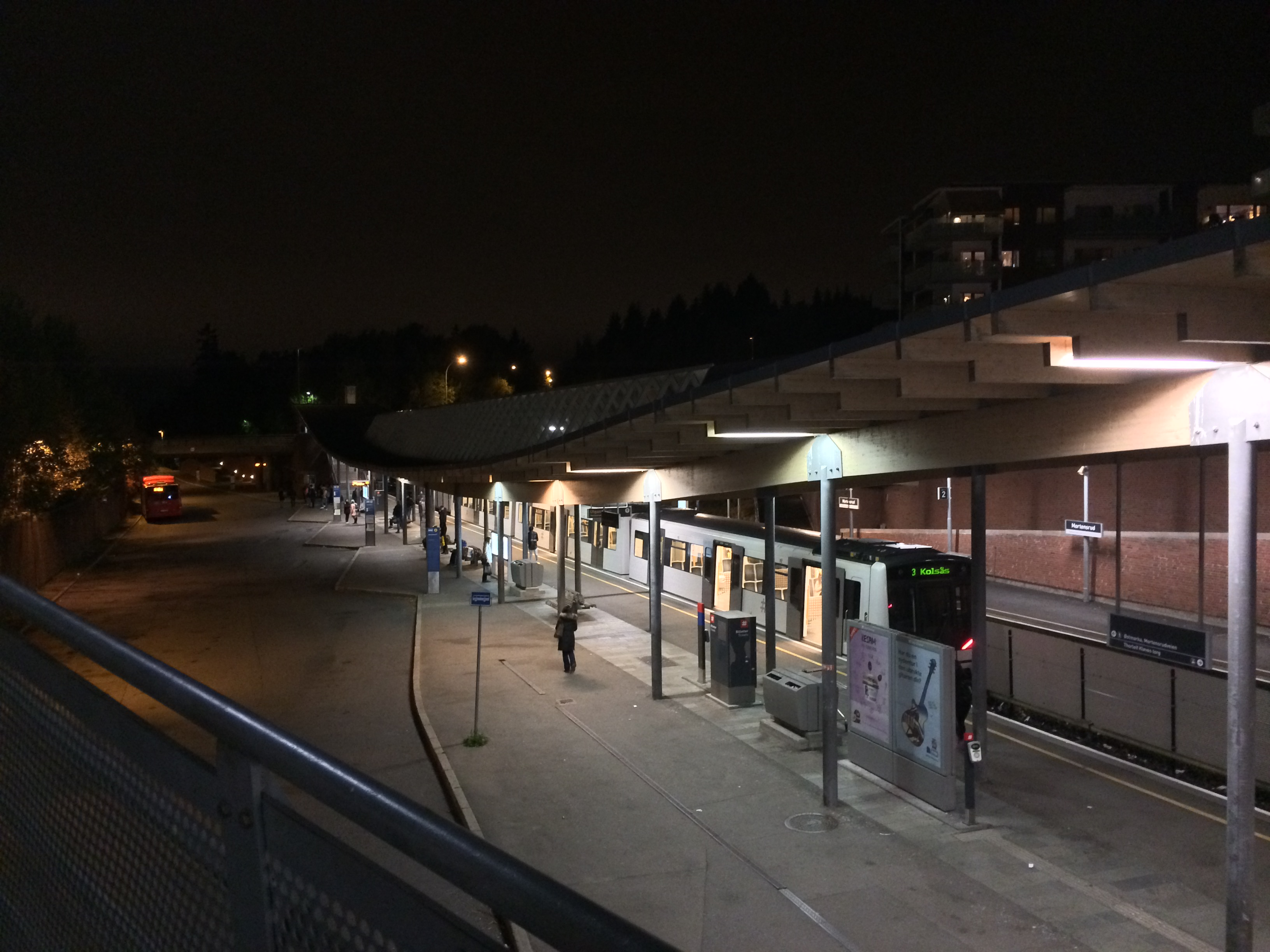
- Mortensrud Station 2016

General information
- Location: Mortensrud, Søndre Nordstrand, Oslo; Norway
- Coordinates: 59°50′57″N 10°49′40″E
- Owner: Sporveien
- Operator: Sporveien T-banen
- Line: Østensjø Line
- Distance: 13.6 km (8.5 mi) from Stortinget
- Connections: Bus: 71A Bjørndal ( - Jernbanetorget); 71B Seterbråten; 72C Maikollen; 73 Holmlia Stasjon - Brenna; 74 Jernbanetorget; 76 Helsfyr T 70N Bjørndal - Jernbanetorget

Construction
- Structure type: At-grade
- Accessible: Yes

Other information
- Fare zone: 1

History
- Opened: 24 November 1997; 28 years ago
Location

Mortensrud is a rapid transit station on the Østensjø Line of the Oslo Metro. It is located in Mortensrud in the Søndre Nordstrand borough of Oslo, Norway. Construction of the station started in 1995, which was taken into use on 24 November 1997, when it became the terminal station of the line—following a 2.4 kilometres (1.5 mi) extension from Skullerud. The extension cost 215 million kr to build, and most of the section is in tunnels. The station is built in concrete, wood and stone, and cost NOK 35 million. It is served by line 3, in addition to being an important bus terminal for the borough, including a feeder service to Bjørndal. Travel time along the 13.6-kilometre (8.5 mi) section to the city center is 24 minutes. In 2001–02, the station had 2,077 daily boarding passengers. The station serves the surrounding residential area, as well as an adjacent shopping center. South of the station is a turning line for trains.

== History ==
The Østensjø Line opened as a light rail on 18 December 1923. On 29 October 1967, the upgraded metro standard was first used, and the line was connected to the Oslo Metro. A month later, the extension to Skullerud opened. The work with building the extension between Skullerud and Mortensrud was originally planned to start in 1992, with completion planned for 1994. However, construction did not start until 1995. The 2.4-kilometre (1.5 mi) extension is built to allow speeds of 100 kilometres per hour (62 mph), and represents a considerable longer distance between stations than what is normal on the network. Most of the section is in tunnels, though there are also two viaducts. The extension (without the new station) cost NOK 215 million. The line runs somewhat south of the station, allowing space to line up trains, and for future further extension of the line.

The station was taken into use on 24 November 1997, but not officially opened until 4 January 1998. On the day of the official opening, the bus terminal was taken into use. The station costs NOK 35 million. At the time, it was estimated to have about 6000 daily users—both boarding and disembarking, including the bus terminal.

== Facilities ==
The station is located in the residential area of Mortensrud, in Søndre Nordstrand. Mortensrud is an open station without any barriers and free access from the bus stops. The station area is one storey below from the surrounding area. It has step-free access, and at the same level as the buses. Only the western portion of the two side platforms is in use, where direct connection can be made with buses. The station is located adjacent to the shopping center at Mortensrud. The station is designed by Arkitektskap. It is built in concrete, covered in red brick, steel, natural rock and wood, that will allow lianas to grow on them. The roofover the western platform is curved, and made of wood and glass. There is an underground parking lot in two levels.

== Service ==
Mortensrud is served by line 3 on the Østensjø Line, operated by Oslo T-banedrift on contract with Ruter. The rapid transit serves the station every 15 minutes, except in the late evening and on weekend mornings, when there is a 30-minute headway. Travel time along the 13.6-kilometre (8.5 mi) portion to Stortinget in the city center is 24 minutes. In 2001–02, the station had 2,077 daily boarding passengers.

The station functions as a major bus terminal for Søndre Nordstrand. Ruter operates feeder bus services to Dal, Brenna, Kantarellen (all no. 73) and Bjørndal (no. 71A). The station is the end station of route 74 (Jernbanetorget) and route 76 (Helsfyr). Line 71A during rush hour also terminates/starts at Jernbanetorget.

Preceding station	Oslo Metro	Following station
Skullerud towards Kolsås	Line 3	Terminus
