= List of disused Oslo Tramway stations =

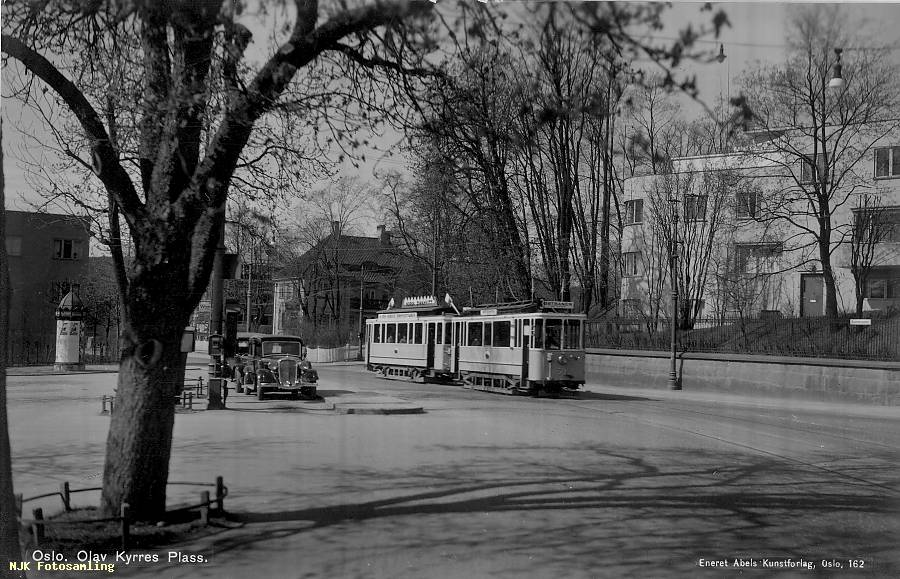
Olav Kyrres plass in the 1930s

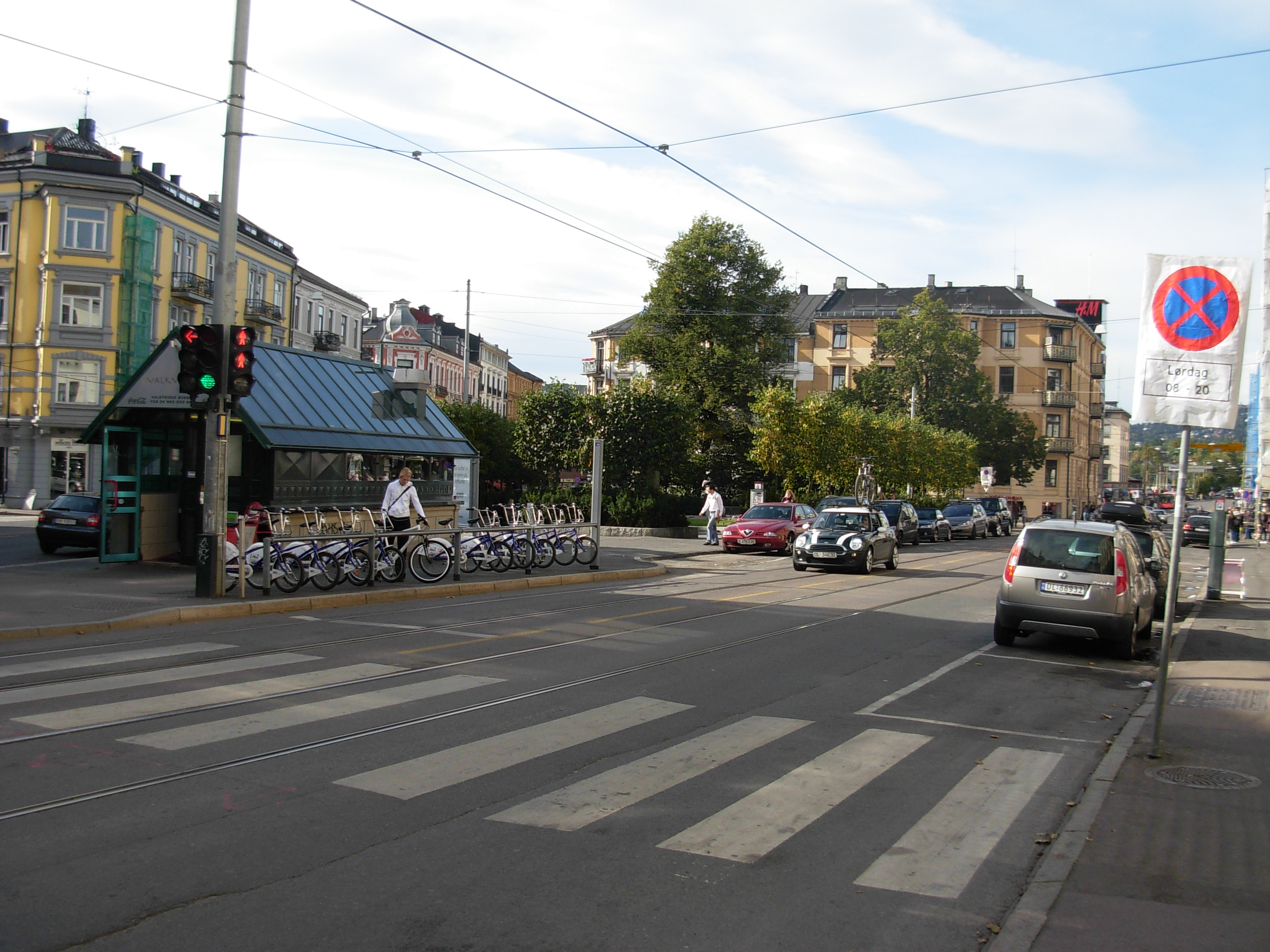
In 2004, Valkyrie plass was closed

This is a list of disused Oslo Tramway stations that lists 19 tram stations in Oslo, Norway. The first stations to be closed were Ekebergparken, Simensbråten and Smedstua on the Simensbråten Line in 1967. In 2006, the stations Olav Kyrres plass, Halvdan Svartes gate and Nobels gate were merged into one.

== Stations ==
Station	Line	Locale	Opened	Closed	Ref(s)
Bestum	Lilleaker	Bestum	1919	2004	
Chr. Michelsens gate	Grünerløkka–Torshov	Torshov	????	????	
Ekebergparken	Simensbråten	Ekeberg	1931	1967	
Frederik Stangs gate	Skøyen	Skillebekk	????	????	
Halvdan Svartes gate	Skøyen	Frogner	????	2004	
Handelsbygningen	Briskeby	Solli	????	2004	
Hollendergata	Ekeberg	Grønland	????	????	
Jacob Aalls gate	Briskeby	Majorstuen	????	????	
Magnus Bergs gate	Frogner	Elisenberg	????	????	
Meltzers gate	Briskeby	Briskeby	????	2004	
Operaen	Grünerløkka–Torshov	Sentrum	????	????	
Posthuset	Grünerløkka–Torshov	Sentrum	1985	2006	
Rosenborg	Briskeby	Bogstadveien	????	2014	
Schweigaards gate	Gamleby	Sentrum	????	????	
Schultz' gate	Briskeby	Bogstadveien	????	2014	
Simensbråten	Simensbråten	Simensbråten	1931	1967	
Smedstua	Simensbråten	Simensbråten	1931	1967	
Sporveisgata	Ullevål Hageby	Bislett	????	????	
Vestre Aker kirke, changed name to Ullevålsalleen before closure	Ullevål Hageby	Ullevål Hageby	????	????	
Valkyrie plass	Briskeby	Majorstuen	????	2004	
Vibes gate	Briskeby	Majorstuen	????	2004	

== See also ==
- List of disused Oslo Metro stations

== Bibliography ==
- Aspenberg, Nils Carl (1994). Trikker og forstadsbaner i Oslo (in Norwegian). Oslo: Baneforlaget. ISBN 82-91448-03-5.
- Hartmann, Eivind; Mangset, Øistein (2001). Neste stopp!: verneplan for bygninger (in Norwegian). Oslo: Baneforlaget. ISBN 82-91448-17-5.
- Nilsen, Knut A. (1998). Nordmarkstrikken – Holmenkollbanen gjennom 100 år (in Norwegian). Oslo: Aschehoug. ISBN 82-03-22262-5.
- Rønneberg, Kjell, ed. (2000). Oslo-kartboka 2000 (in Norwegian) (15th ed.). Oslo: Cappelen. ISBN 82-02-18615-3.
