= Posthuset =

Posthuset (lit. "Post Office Building") may refer to:

- Posthuset (Gothenburg)
- Central Post Office Building (Stockholm)
- Posthuset (station), Oslo, Norway
