= Gullfisk =

Norwegian tram class, in service 1937–1985

Class B and Class E "Gullfisk"
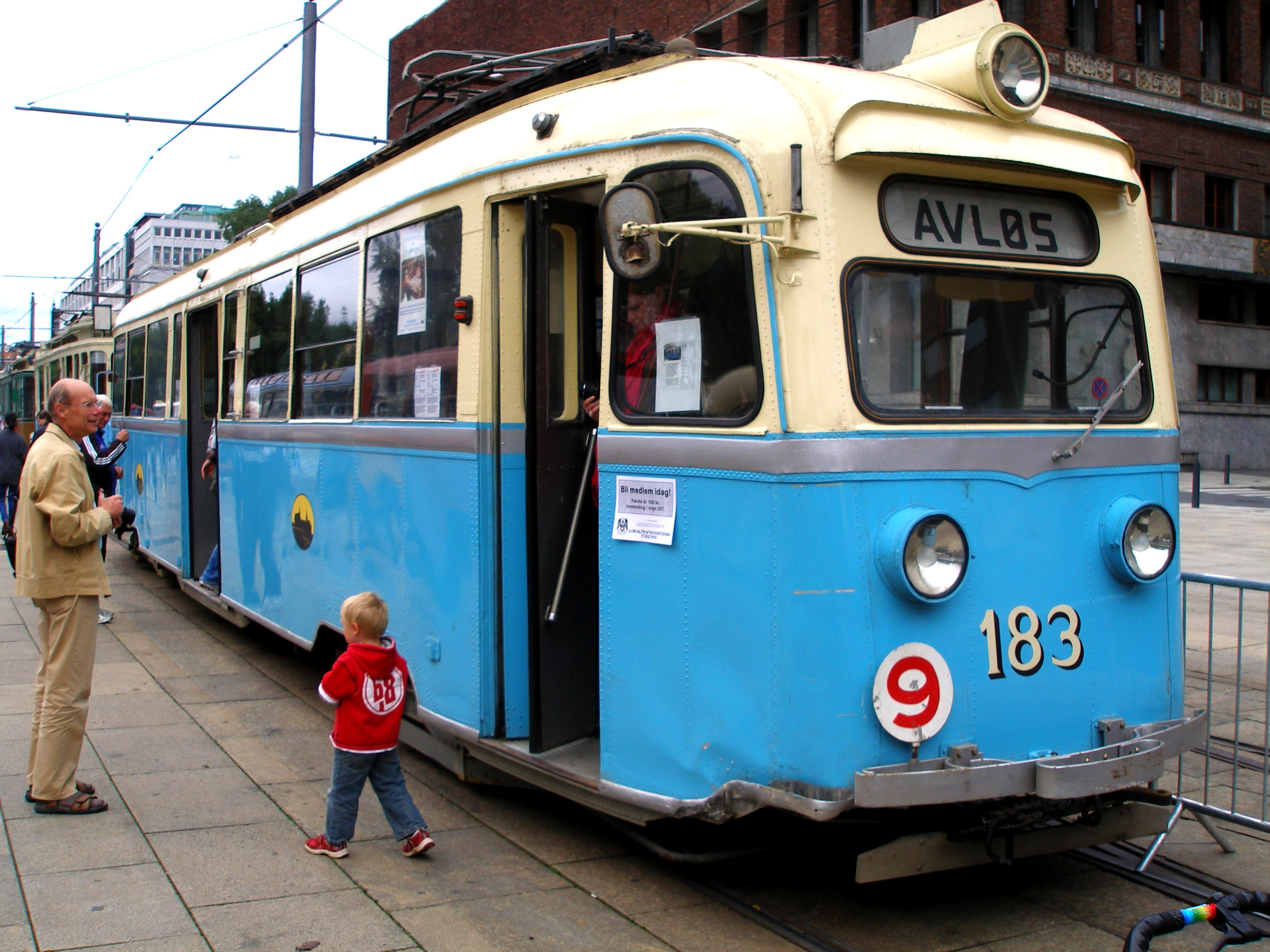
- A preserved Gullfisk
- Manufacturer: Strømmens Verksted
- Constructed: 1937–1939
- Number built: 46
- Fleet numbers: 158–204
- Capacity: 44-49 seats
- Operators: Oslo Sporveier; Bærumsbanen

Specifications
- Car length: 15.40 m (50 ft 6 in)
- Width: 2.50 m (8 ft 2 in)
- Doors: 2
- Maximum speed: 65 km/h (40 mph)
- Weight: 15.0 tons
- Traction system: ELIN BBFa20 traction motors, 4 off
- Power output: 146 kW (196 hp)
- Electric system(s): 600 V DC Overhead line
- Current collector(s): Pantograph
- Track gauge: 1,435 mm (4 ft 8 1/2 in)

Class B and Class E, normally referred to as Gullfisk (Norwegian for "goldfish"), were a class of 46 trams built by Strømmens Værksted and Skabo Jernbanevognfabrikk for Oslo Sporveier and Bærumsbanen of Oslo, Norway, in 1937 and 1939. They were the first aluminium trams to operate on the Oslo Tramway and the first bogie trams to operate on street lines. They had contemporary modern electronic equipment, a streamlined shape, and comfortable accommodation. Until 1964, they were also faster than any other Norwegian tramcar or suburban railcar.

Six prototype trams were delivered by Strømmen in 1937, with four different motor solutions, from AEG, Siemens, Vickers and Norsk Elektrisk & Brown Boveri (NEBB). None of these were particularly successful, and the 40 serial production trams used conventional motors from ELIN. These were delivered in 1939, with 20 (class E) being used by Oslo Sporveier mainly on the Kjelsås Line, but also on other services. The remaining 20 trams (class B) were leased to Bærumsbanen, that used them on the Kolsås and Østensjø Lines, and later on the Ekeberg Line.

From 1967, Oslo Sporveier transferred all its trams to Bærumsbanen, where they remained in use until 1985. The class has been involved in several fatal incidents, including the Strømsveien tram fire in 1958. Six trams (prototype no 163, nos 166, 170, 196 and 199) remain at the Oslo Tramway Museum; whilst Oslo Sporveier has kept two and converted them to maintenance vehicles (nos 185 and 198), painted them yellow with zebra stripes. They also kept one themselves as a veteran tram (no 183).

== Background ==
During the 1930s, Oslo Sporveier operated a fleet of 150 trams and 130 trailers. The latest series, the HaWa Class, had been delivered during the early 1920s and were, by the late 1930s, becoming old fashioned, with low speed, uncomfortable interiors and a two-axle wheel arrangement. Increased competition from cars and buses made the tram company start a process to find a new "generation" of trams and buses. In 1935, an agreement was made with Stømmmens Værksted to build a series of aluminium-bogied trams and buses. Since the last order, the tracks had been relaid farther from one another, so the tramway could operate 2.5-metre (8.2 ft) wide and 15-metre (49 ft) long trams.

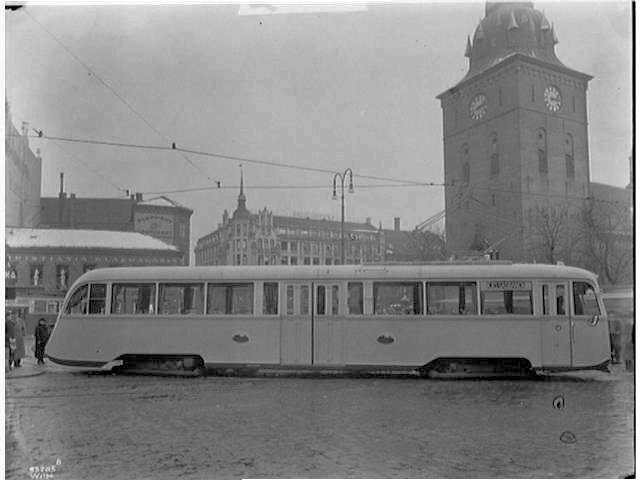
Side view of a Gullfisk in 1937

The use of an aluminium body was controversial, and international experts recommended that the tram company should not choose that solution. The goal was to decrease the weight so the trams could operate with less-powerful motors, giving a lower cost. The first prototype was a full-scale model of a tram, built at Homansbyen Depot in 1935, using an undercarriage from disused horsecars.

== Construction ==
Strømmens Værksted delivered six prototypes for Oslo Sporveier in 1937, all with slightly different specifications. They were numbered 158–163. The four main types of prototypes were later designated B2 (158–159 with motors from Vickers), E4 (160 with motors from Siemens), E3 (161–162 with motors from AEG) and E2 (163 with motors from NEBB). The trams were taken into use in February 1937 on the Kjelsås Line. They were capable of 65 km/h (40 mph), compared to the maximum 35 km/h (22 mph) possible by the older trams. According to tests by JG Brill Company, which was a specialist on high-speed interurban railcars, streamline construction would afford a power reduction of 17% at as low speed as 32 km/h (20 mph).

Shortly after being taken into use, No. 158 lost braking power, killing one person when it landed on the pavement. The initial plan was to use the six trams to operate all services on the Kjelsås Line, with one vehicle in reserve, but this was not possible because of more out-of-service vehicles than estimated.

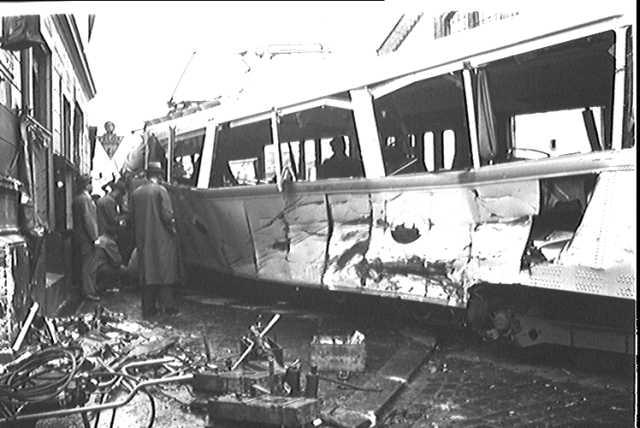
The first accident, on 15 May 1937

A further 40 units were ordered—20 from Strømmens Værksted and 20 license-built by Skabo Jernbanevognfabrikk. The various experimental configurations fitted to the prototype trams did not work too well; and instead a conventional motor solution was chosen. The serial units were also not equipped with regenerative brakes. The series from Strømmen and Skabo received the same motors and bogies, but the electrical equipment was different. The Skabo series had electrical equipment from AEG and was optimized for street-tram operation, while the Strømmen trams were optimized for the suburban tramways and equipped with electrical equipment from Vickers. The Strømmen series was delivered from February to June 1939 and leased to Oslo Sporveier's subsidiary Bærumsbanen, which gave them the designation Class B. They were put into service on the Østensjø–Kolsås Line, with both end stations far outside Oslo's city limits that time. The trams partially ran through a relatively rural landscape, and more than any other Norwegian tramway this line may be called an interurban. The Oslo Sporveier trams were numbered 164–183, while the Bærumsbanen trams were numbered 184–203. The tram's body was streamlined and had a tail at the end that made them look like a goldfish. They were therefore nicknamed "Gullfisk", the Norwegian term for goldfish; this later became the most common term for the class.

== Operation ==
During World War II, the rationing of petroleum fuels gave a boost to ridership on the electric tramways. To handle the massive increase in ridership, the trams were equipped with two conductors. The single-centre-door solution that worked excellently before the war became a bottle-neck as the trams became packed with riders. Lack of parts, particularly for the British Vickers motors, caused long waits for defective vehicles at the depots. From 1942, the Kolsås Line was transferred to terminate at Nationaltheatret in the city centre, and the Class B was operated along the Lilleaker Line from the west. Trams 164–166 were sent to Düsseldorf in Germany, but were never used because the city lacked balloon loops and the trams were too wide.

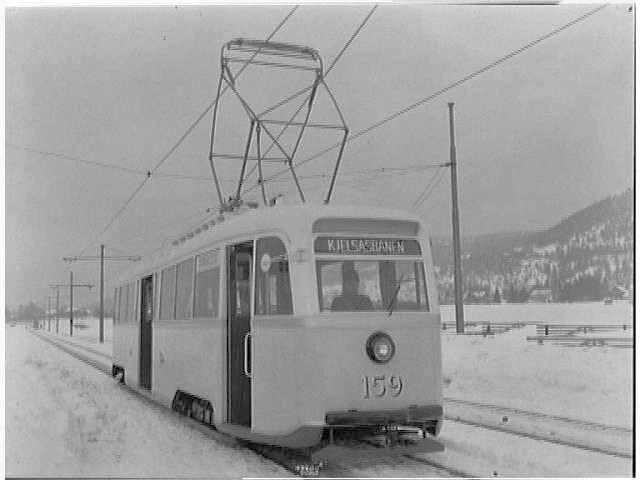
A Gullfisk on the Kjelsås Line in 1937

After the end of the war, Oslo Sporveier decided to transfer all the remaining trams to Bærumsbanen. Their high speed made them well suited on the light rail, but the centre door reduced their capacity. The order of the SM53-series from Høka gave Oslo Sporveier sufficient stock to operate the street lines, and from 1952 to 1957, the company transferred the 19 trams to Bærumsbanen. Here, they were given the designation Class E. No. 163 was in too bad condition to be used on the line, and was retired. In October 1949, no. 184 caught fire and was taken out of service. On 2 August 1958, five people perished and 17 were injured in the Strømsveien tram fire, the worst disaster in the tramway's history.

The Østensjø Line became part of the Oslo Metro in 1967, and several of the Class E trams were transferred to other parts of the tramway. However, the Lilleaker Line was instead tied to the Ekeberg Line on the east side of the city, and the trams started operating on the Jar–Ljabru service. After the last bus route had been converted to one-man operation and the conductor replaced with a ticket-selling motorman, Oslo Sporveier started the process of converting their tram fleet. No. 176 was converted as a trial, and after 1971, all the remaining Gullfisks were converted. Because the trams had been delivered with a single front door, the cost of converting the trams was very small, and the single-manning highly profitable.

In 1976, a class B tram was retired after it had lost braking power and crashed near Sjømannsskolen on the Ekeberg Line. After this, only selected trams were given overhauls, the last being no. 170 in 1980. Following the delivery of the articulated SL79, the Class B and E were gradually retired, with the last tram running into 1985. Oslo Tramway Museum has kept six trams, while Oslo Sporveier kept two, converted them to maintenance vehicles and painted them yellow with zebra stripes.

== Specifications ==
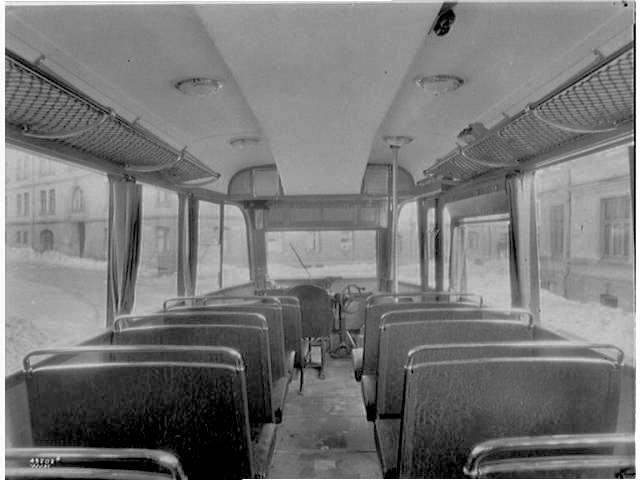
Interior of a Gullfisk from 1937

The Gullfisk were built as self-contained aluminium riveted bodies. This gave a light body that was strong as steel, giving what at the time was regarded as a more elastic structure which would not break as easy. However, this resulted in the bodies sinking somewhat at the ends and between the bogies. It also caused more deformation during accidents, increasing the costs of repairs. The bodies were 15.40 meters (50 ft 6 in) long and 2.50 meters (8 ft 2 in) wide. The centre beam between the two bogies was made of steel, and was intended to compensate for the soft aluminium structure; these were prone to rust and needed repeated replacement. The bodies had a very streamlined shape and a distinct tail, that in addition to the aesthetic purpose was chosen because it strengthened the structure. During prototyping, the vehicle was tested in a wind tunnel.

The trams were unidirectional and had a single door at the front and a double door in the middle, both on the right side. Class E also had a single door at the rear. The trams were originally delivered with two compartments, with a wall and inside door in front of the centre door. This was removed after the trams became smoke-free. They had a partial wooden interior, with linoleum floors. Various renovations changed the panelling, usually variations of brown and yellow. The trams originally had incandescent light bulbs, but these were replaced with fluorescent lamps after 1955. From 1970 to 1974, the trams were rebuilt to remove the conductor, and the driver was given space for a purse and ticket machine, as well as an announcement system. The E-series eventually had the rear door taken out of use and blocked with an extra seat.

All but one of the trams had a SV36-bogie from Strømmens Værksted. The two bogies, each with two axles, were attached to the steel crossbeam. The aluminium body was attached to the crossbeam with leaf springs. The bogie frames were fastened to the axle box via a revolute joint and a spiral spring. Each bogie had two motors, each controlling one axle. In 1941, no. 187 was equipped with a SV41-bogie from Strømmen; it had a different spring system that allowed the tram to remain at the same height independent of the weight.

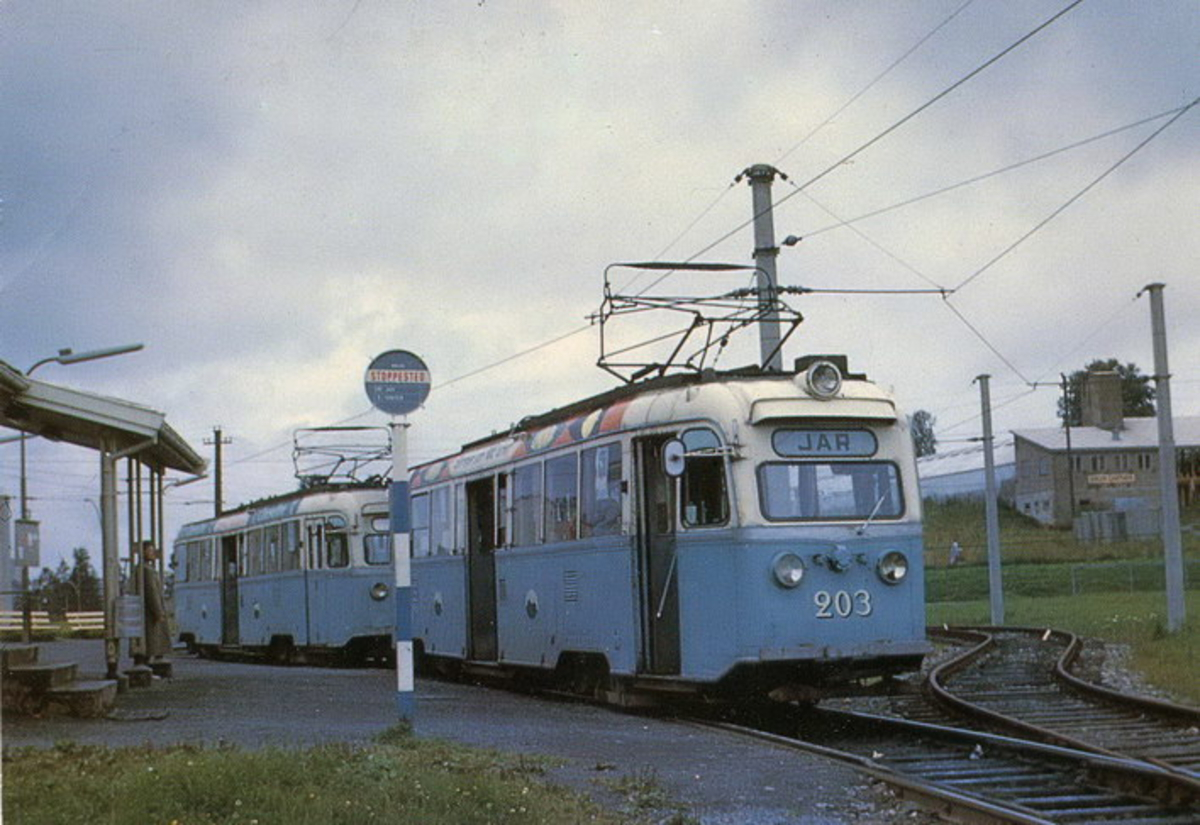
A Gullfisk at Bøler, 1962.

Class E was equipped with disc brakes, while the Class B was equipped with drum brakes. All the trams were equipped with rail brakes, and dynamic brakes. The serial production models were equipped with four 36.6-kilowatt (49.1 hp) ELIN BBFa20 motors. This gave a maximum speed of 65 km/h (40 mph). They were built with two serial motors connected in parallel to the two other serial motors, so each motor used 300 V.

=== Prototypes ===
No. 158 and 159 were equipped with four 36.5-kilowatt (48.9 hp) Vickers 116E motors. This was a compound motor with regenerative brakes. The trams had sixteen regulating notches and were very complicated to operate. The technology had previously been used in Birmingham, but there the tram company had discontinued them quickly because of their complexity. This complicated set-up was part of the reason for the fatal accident in Sannergata in 1937. The regenerative brakes were removed in the late 1940s. The two trams' motors were prone to technical failures, and spent much time in the workshop. They weighed 12.87 tonnes (12.67 long tons; 14.19 short tons).

No. 160 was equipped with four 33.5-kilowatt (44.9 hp) Siemens DW331e motors. The motor controller and electrical equipment were run by a battery that was charged from the overhead wire. The motorman regulated the motor controller that again magnetized the motors. The tram was also equipped with regenerative brakes. Particularly the battery-charging system had many defects, and the tram needed frequent repairs. Eventually the controller and regenerative brakes were removed. It weighed 13.16 tonnes (12.95 long tons; 14.51 short tons).

No. 161 and 162 were equipped with four 33.0-kilowatt (44.3 hp) AEG USL2039 motors. They had a conventional design and regenerative brakes, although the latter was eventually removed. They had many technical difficulties, and held Bærumsbanen's record in maintenance time. They weighed 13.57 tonnes (13.36 long tons; 14.96 short tons).

No. 163 was equipped with two 50.0-kilowatt (67.1 hp) NEBB GLM1303 motors, one on each bogie that powered both axles. This caused problems because the monomotor required the wheels to be ground regularly to avoid uneven driving, but this was not discovered until 1941. It weighed 13.44 tonnes (13.23 long tons; 14.82 short tons).
