= Jomfrubråten =

Neighborhood in Oslo, Norway

Coordinates: 59°53′N 10°46′E

Jomfrubråten is a residential area of Nordstrand in Oslo, Norway. It is located approximately 3 kilometres (1.9 mi) away from the city centre. The area was disintegrated from Ekeberg in 1920, and made a residential area when the Ekeberg Line opened in 1917. A station with the same name serves the area on the Ekeberg Line, and formerly on the Simensbråten Line, but the latter line was closed in 1967.

== Citations ==
Notes

References

- Andersen, Bjørn (1992). Ekebergbanen 75 år (in Norwegian). Oslo: Lokaltrafikkhistorisk Forening. ISBN 82-91223-00-9.
- "Route plan" (PDF). Ruter. 2009.
- Thorsnæs, Geir (2007). "Jomfrubråten". In Tvedt, Knut Are (ed.). Store norske leksikon (in Norwegian). Oslo: Kunnskapsforlaget.
