= Smedstua tram stop =

Tram stop in Oslo, Norway

Smedstua
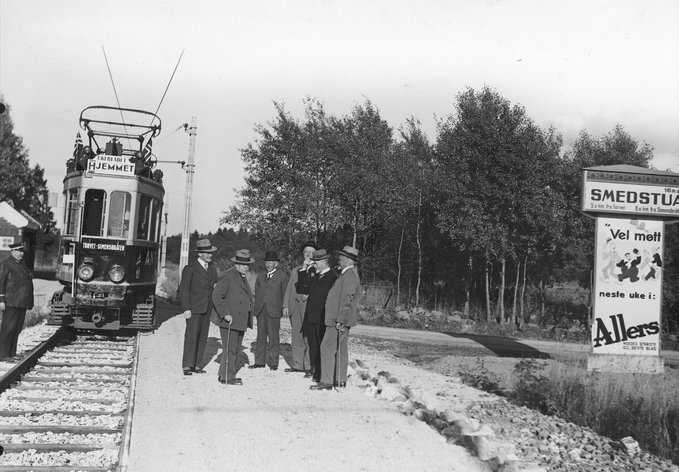
- Opening of the station on 30 September 1931

General information
- Location: Ekeberg, Nordstrand, Oslo; Norway
- Coordinates: 59°53′28″N 10°46′50″E
- Line: Simensbråten Line

History
- Opened: 30 September 1931
- Closed: 29 October 1967
Location

Smedstua was a light rail tram stop on the Simensbråten Line of the Oslo Tramway. It was located at Smedstua in Ekeberg, in the borough of Nordstrand, in Oslo, Norway.

The station opened on 30 September 1931 when the Simensbråten Line was opened as a branch from the Ekeberg Line. The station was closed with the line on to 29 October 1967, following the political decision seven years earlier to gradually close the tramways. Smedstua is located between the old Ekebergparken and Simensbråten. The line was served by shuttle trams to Jomfrubråten, except during rush hour when there were direct services to the city center.
