= Strømsveien tram fire =

Railway accident

Coordinates: 59°54′32.7″N 10°47′17.6″E

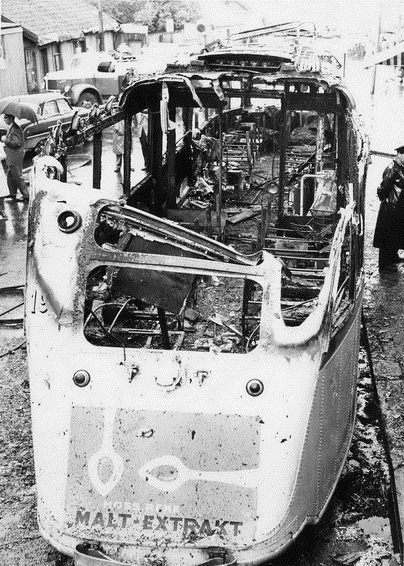
The burnt-out tram

The Strømsveien tram fire (Trikkebrannen i Strømsveien) was a railway accident resulting from a fire erupting in an Oslo Tramway car traveling on Strømsveien street in Oslo, Norway.

On 2 August 1958, a set of two cars, 194 and 198, of the Gullfisk type was traveling the Lilleaker Line ( Lilleakerbanenen) – Østensjø Line (Østensjøbanen) route from Bøler to Jar. This connection was opened in 1937 and the Gullfisk cars introduced in 1939.

As the tram braked as it approached Totengata a technical malfunction caused arcing and a fire erupted in the front of car 198 which was the latter car. The exit door, being operated by the tram driver who was seated in the lead car, remained closed for a few, critical seconds as passengers were struck by panic. The disaster claimed the lives of five people; seventeen were injured. Following the disaster, fire extinguishers, better emergency exits and emergency door openers became mandatory in all public transport.
