= Ekebergparken tram stop (Simensbråten Line) =

Tram stop in Oslo, Norway

Coordinates: 59°53′22″N 10°46′35″E

Ekebergparken
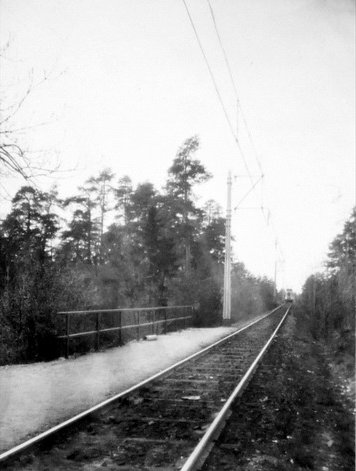

General information
- Location: Ekeberg, Oslo; Norway
- Line: Simensbråten Line

History
- Opened: 30 September 1931
- Closed: 29 October 1967
Location

The old Ekebergparken station was a tram stop on the Simensbråten Line of the Oslo Tramway.

The station opened on 30 September 1931 when the Simensbråten Line was opened as a branch from the Ekeberg Line. The station was closed with the line on to 29 October 1967, following the political decision seven years earlier to gradually close the tramways. Ekebergparken was the first line on the line, located after Jomfrubråten on the Ekeberg Line, and before Smedstua. The line was served by shuttle trams to Jomfrubråten, except during rush hour when there were direct services to the city center.
