= Simensbråten Line =

Former tram line in Oslo, Norway

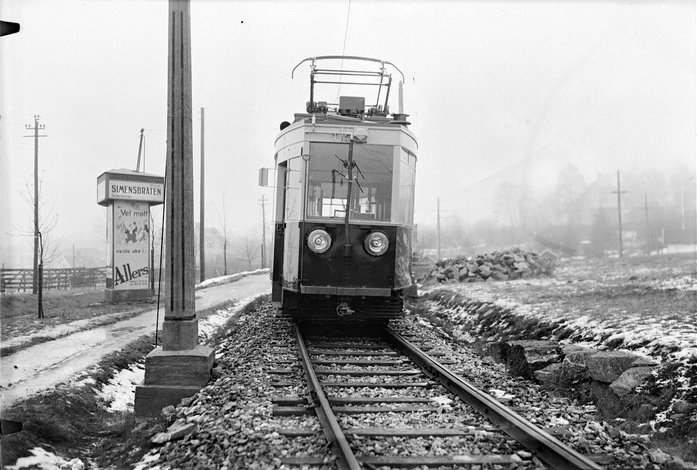
- A tram on the line close to Simensbråten

Overview
- Native name: Simensbråtenlinjen
- Owner: Ekebergbanen
- Locale: Oslo, Norway
- Termini: Jomfrubråten; Simensbråten

Service
- Type: Tramway
- System: Oslo Tramway
- Operator(s): Ekebergbanen

History
- Opened: 30 September 1931
- Closed: 29 October 1967

Technical
- Line length: 1.5 km (0.93 mi)
- Number of tracks: Single
- Track gauge: 1,435 mm (4 ft 8 1/2 in) standard gauge
- Electrification: 1,200 V DC overhead line

The Simensbråten Line (Norwegian: Simensbråtenlinjen) was a light rail line of Oslo Tramway between Jomfrubråten and Simensbråten in Oslo, Norway. Opening on 30 September 1931, it branched off the Ekeberg Line at Jomfrubråten and had three stops along the 1.5-kilometer (0.9 mi) route—Ekebergparken, Smedstua and Simensbråten. Operated by Ekebergbanen, the line was closed on 29 October 1967. It is the only light rail line in Oslo to have been closed.

== Route ==
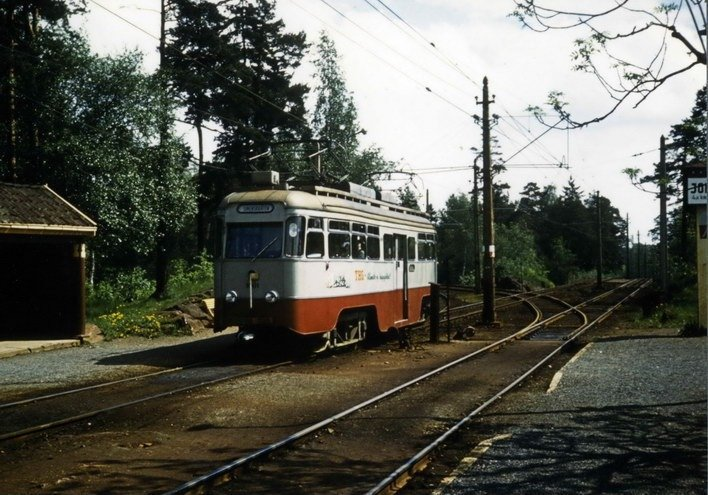
Tram at Jomfrubråten about to divert to the left to leave the Ekeberg Line and enter the Simensbråten Line

The Simensbråten Line was a 1.3-kilometer (0.8 mi) long branch of the Ekeberg Line. It branched off south of Jomfrubråten and had three stations: Ekebergparken, Smedstua and Simensbråten. The line started at 115.0 meters (377.3 ft) above mean sea level and terminated at 146.7 meters (481 ft) above mean sea level. The line served the areas of Ekeberg and Simensbråten. In rush hour Ekebergbanen provided direct services to the city center, but otherwise only provided a shuttle service to Jomfrubråten.

== History ==
In 1918, AS Ekebergbanen sent an application to build a funicular from Gamlebyen (then called Oslo) to Ekebergplatået. This application was recommended by Aker Municipal Council, but the idea was rejected by the Tramway Committee for Kristiania and Aker. They felt a funicular was not an appropriate and efficient means of transport for the planned residential areas at Ekebergplatået. Instead, they recommended a light rail. Oslo City Council stated on 27 April 1921 that instead a branch of the Ekeberg Line should be built from Sportsplassen Station to Simensbråten, in addition to the funicular.

A committee was established with representatives from the municipalities of Oslo, Aker, and Ekebergbanen. It saw the benefits of both lines, but recommended that the light rail be prioritized. Negotiations started between the municipalities and the company. Ekebergbanen stated that it was not possible to operate the branch line profitably, and that they could not raise sufficient capital to build the branch. In April 1922, the three made an agreement about the branch. However, at the time the plateau was being considered as one of the possible locations for the new airport to serve Oslo, and this delayed the planning. In 1927, concession was granted by royal resolution, after it had been decided to build the new airport at Fornebu.

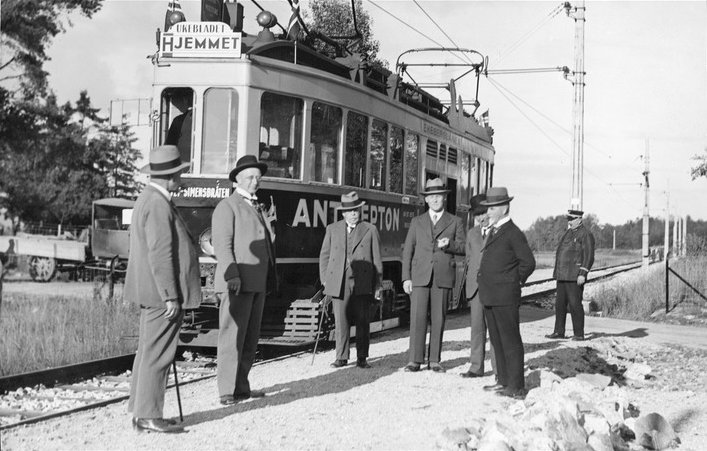
From the opening day, 30 September 1931, at Smedstua

Construction of the line started in December 1928 During construction, the Ekeberg Line past Jomfrubråten was moved. Instead of following Kongsveien, it was moved further up. The double-tracked Ekeberg Line was placed on the new line, while the Simensbråten Line would follow the old route along Kongsveien. The Simensbråten Line would thus cross under the Ekebergn Line and then through a curve turn onto its right-of-way. The Simensbråten Line was completed in mid-1931 and It was officially opened on 30 September 1931. The line was never profitable, and needed municipal grants to operate.

The Simensbråten Line was planned extended onwards to Lambertseter. In December 1931, concession for the extension was sent, either east or west of Brannfjellet. The application was amended in 1932 all the way to Nordstrandveien. In 1938, the application was approved by the Parliament of Norway, but Oslo and Aker municipalities could not agree on the route along Brannfjellet. In addition, Aker insisted that the Ekeberg Line first be extended south of Sæter before the Simensbråten Line be extended. A compromise was never found, and the line never extended.

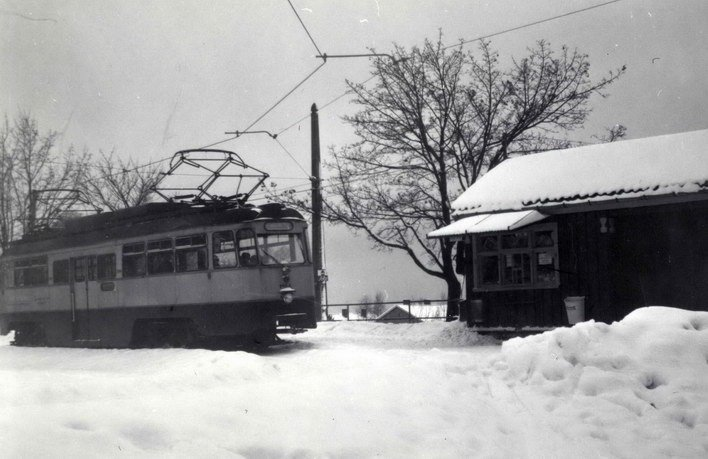
Tram at Simensbråten

World War II and the limitations on fuel gave the Ekeberg Line a large increase in traffic Unlike many other Norwegian tramways, the tram vehicles were not confiscated and moved to Germany, because no German tramways used both 1,200 volts and allowed 2.5-meter (8 ft 2 in) wide vehicles. Following the end of the war, it was decided that Oslo and Aker would merge. Ekebergbanen's concession lasted until 30 June 1947, which was initially extended on year. In March 1948, Oslo Sporveier, the municipal company that operated among other things the street tramways, offered to purchase Ekebergbanen. All but eight shares were sold, and from December the board of Ekebergbanen and Oslo Sporveier was identical. However, the company retained its own name, administration, rolling stock and personnel.

After the nationalization, the company started a renovation process of the infrastructure and rolling stock. Combined with a municipal policy of low fares, the company started going with a loss. Five new trams were delivered from 1948 to 1952, and built at the depot at Holtet, with used equipment from some of the older trams. An additional nine new trams were delivered between 1952 and 1955. Five additional trams were rebuilt from 1955 to 1960, by which time all the narrow trams had been rebuilt or retired. The use of a unique voltage gave operational difficulties, as fuses could regularly blow at Oslo Hospital if errors were done while switching from the one current to the other. In addition, all the trams were custom built with extra equipment with limited spare parts. All the trams delivered during the 1950s were built so they could later be converted to only use 600 volt power. The depot was expanded in 1952.

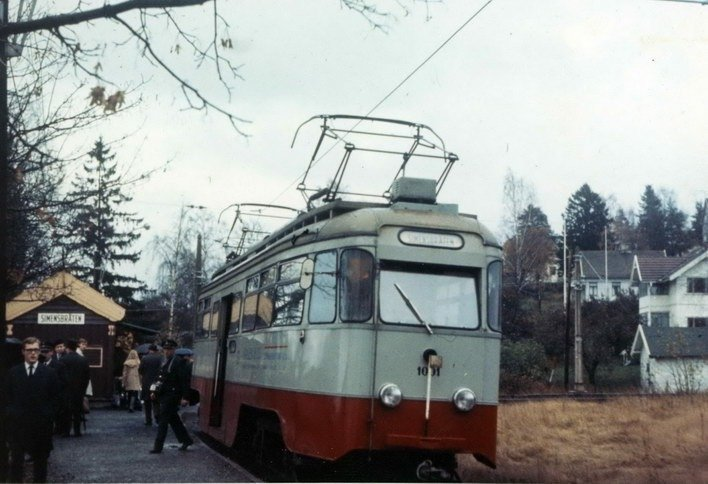
Last day of operations, 29 October 1967

In 1960, the Oslo City Council voted to close the street tramway and replace all routes with either diesel buses or the Oslo Metro. The specific plans for the Ekeberg Line were not decided, although the line was considered either to be a stand-alone light rail or connected to the metro. From 30 October 1960, the route for the Simensbråten Line trams in the city changed, so they instead followed the route Schweigaards gate – Vognmannsgata –Jernbanetorget – Kirkeristen to Stortorvet instead of the old route via Grønland and Brugata. From 1963, the route terminated at Jernbanetorget, after the rest of the route was closed due to the construction of the metro.

From 1 July 1965, Oslo Sporveier took over the operation of the Simensbråten Line, which was numbered Line 16. Oslo Sporveier took over all employees and rolling stock, but Ekebergbanen remained a holding and real estate company. Immediately following the take-over, Oslo Sporveier introduced a 20-minute headway and suggested that the line be closed and replaced by buses from 29 October 1967, when the Østensjø Line of the metro opened. Following the closing of Sagene Ring, there were increased protests against closing the tramway. Traffic had decreased on the Ekeberg Line, but proponents for keeping it stated that this was because Oslo Sporveier had reduced the frequency and moved the end station out of the core of the city center. When the proposal to close the Ekeberg Line was considered by the city council, it was decided that only the Simenbråten Line was to be closed. The Simensbråten Line is the only light rail line in Oslo to have been closed. It was replaced by a bus route that went up the other side of the hill, and did not correspond with the Ekeberg Line.
