= Simensbråten =

Neighborhood in Nordstrand, Oslo, Norway

Coordinates: 59°54′N 10°48′E

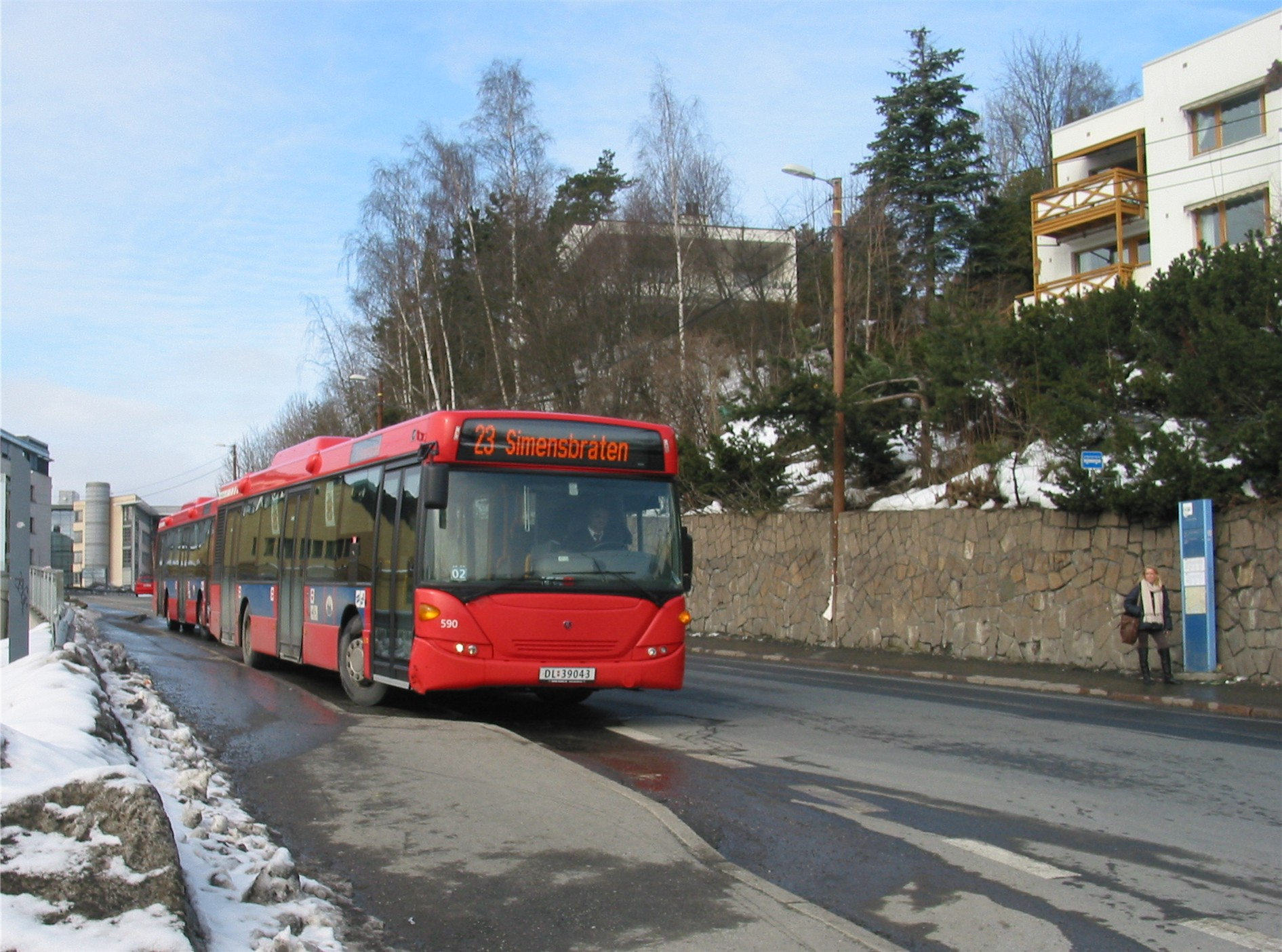
The 23 bus, heading for Simensbråten, photographed at Lilleaker.

Simensbråten is a neighborhood in the borough of Nordstrand, Oslo, Norway.

A mainly residential area, the suburb is located alongside a grove dividing Simensbråten from Brattlikollen.

== Transport ==
It was the location of the Oslo Tramway light rail station Simensbråten, the terminus of the Simensbråten Line which existed from 1931 to 1967. The area formerly served by Simensbråten station is currently served by Ryen T-bane station. In addition, Simensbråten is the terminus of bus line nr. 23.
