= Posthuset tram stop =

Railway station in Oslo, Norway

Coordinates: 59°54′38″N 10°44′48″E

Posthuset

General information
- Location: Kvadraturen, Sentrum, Oslo; Norway
- System: Former tram stop on the Oslo Tramway
Location

Posthuset station was a former tram stop on the Oslo Tramway. It has since been replaced by Dronningens gate station.

Posthuset station was located between Jernbanetorget station in the east and Kongens gate station in the west. It is named after the old post office of central Oslo (now superseded by Postgirobygget), which was located at Prinsens gate 8.
