= Oslo Tramway Museum =

Tram museum in Oslo, Norway

Coordinates: 59.9311°N 10.7166°E

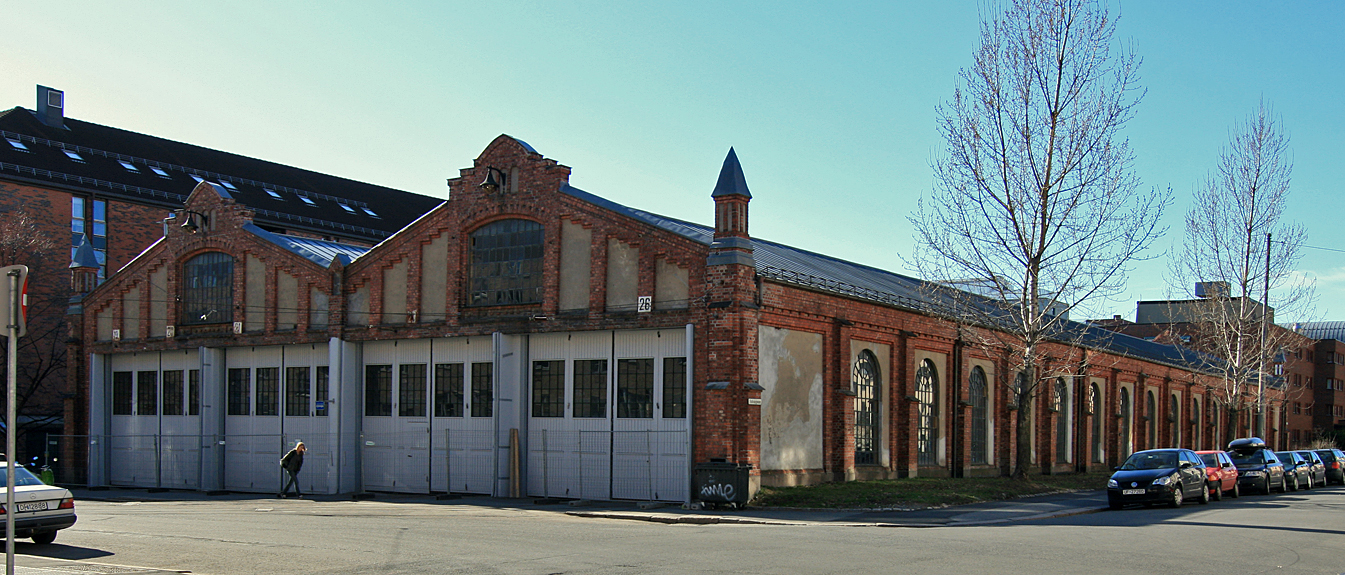
The museum at Majorstuen

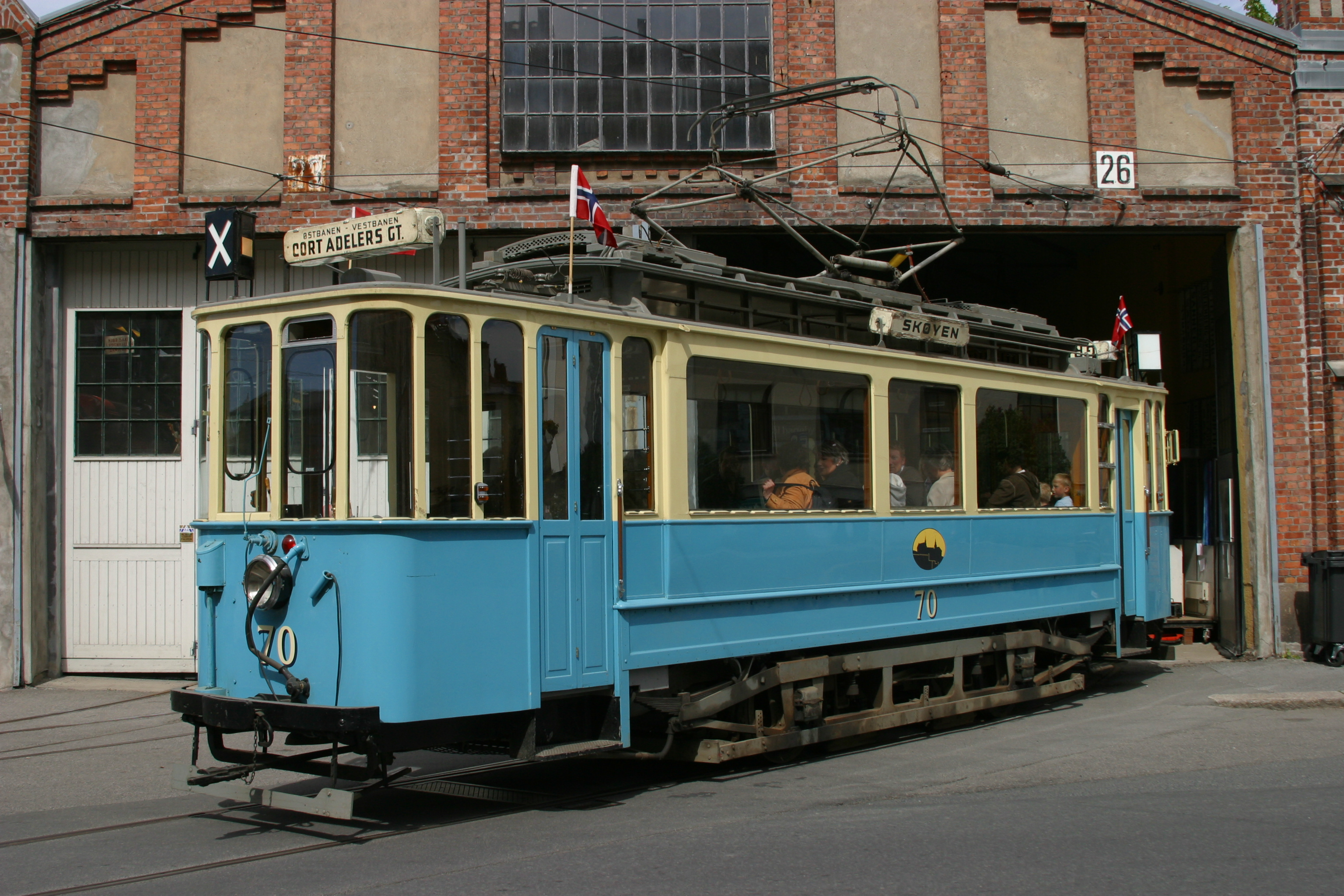
Heritage tram no. 70 in Oslo Sporveier livery

Oslo Tramway Museum (Norwegian: Sporveismuseet is a railway museum located at Majorstuen in Oslo, Norway. It is dedicated to the preservation of the Oslo Tramway, Oslo T-bane, Oslo trolleybus and buses used in Oslo. The museum is run by the non-profit organization Lokaltrafikkhistorisk Forening with 645 members (2019). The museum also operates a heritage tramway in Vinterbro outside Oslo.

Lokaltrafikkhistorisk Forening was founded in 1966, six years after the city council had decided to close down the tramway and trolleybus. This followed the closing of the Bergen Tramway, where only a single tram had been kept. As of 2004, the museum had 56 rail vehicles, 31 buses and seven other vehicles. This included four trolleybuses.

== Majorstuen ==
The tramway museum at Majorstuen is located in Depot 5. Since 1985, the museum has been connected to the tramway at Majorstuen Station. This consists of a hall with 25 trams, 10 buses and other vehicles on display, as well as offices for the organization and a store. There is also heritage runs with old tram stock on the Oslo Tramway.

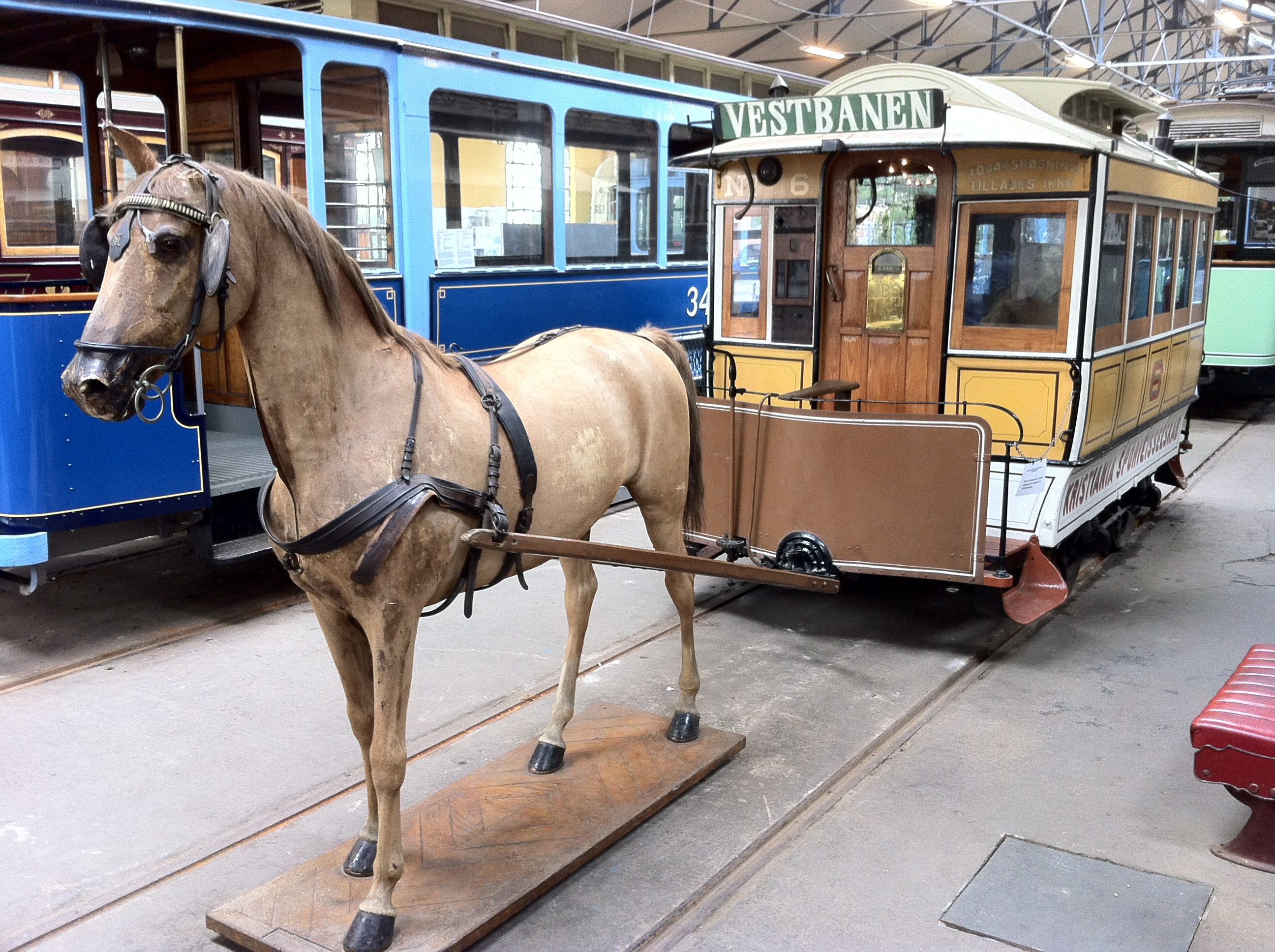

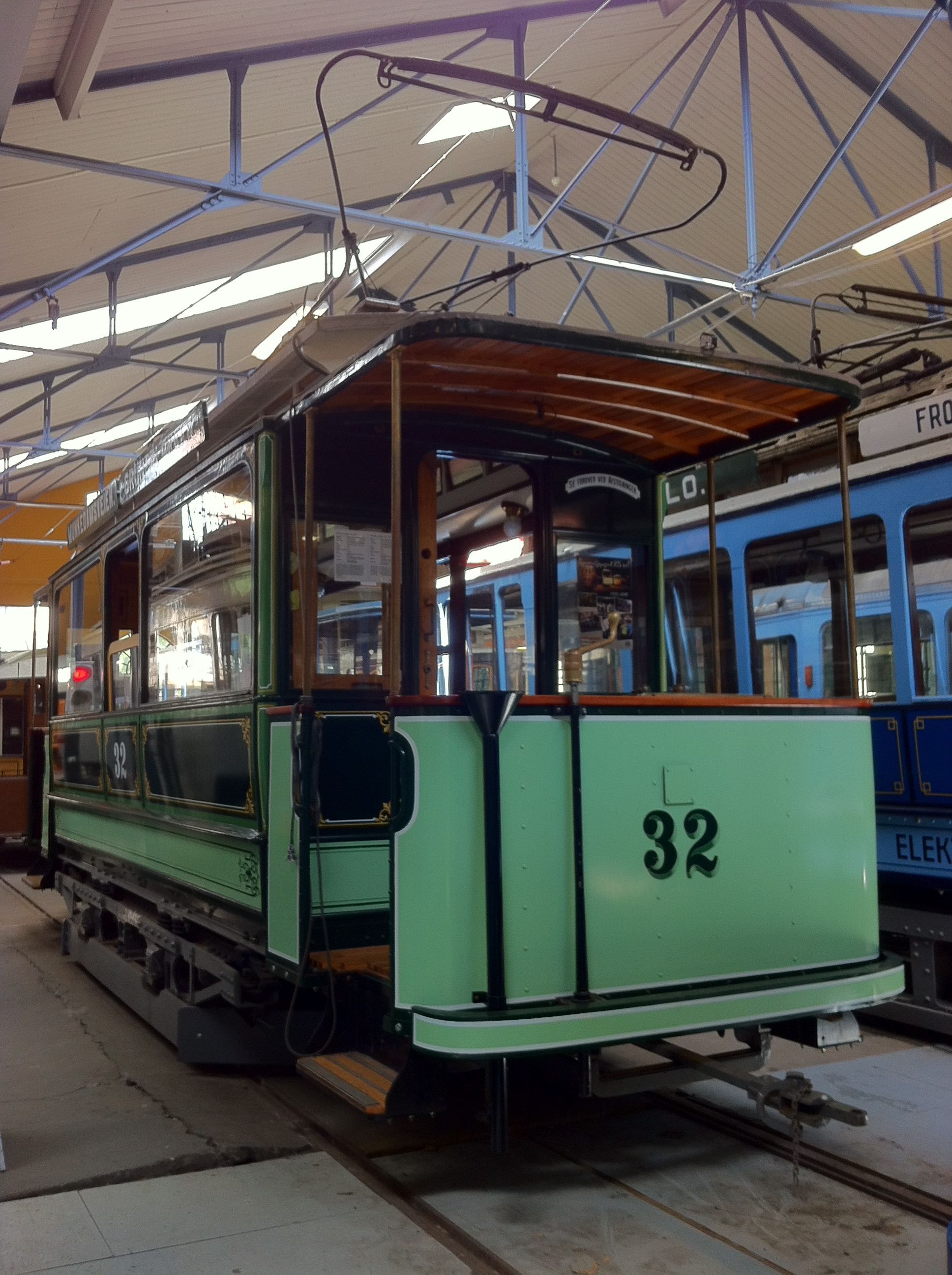

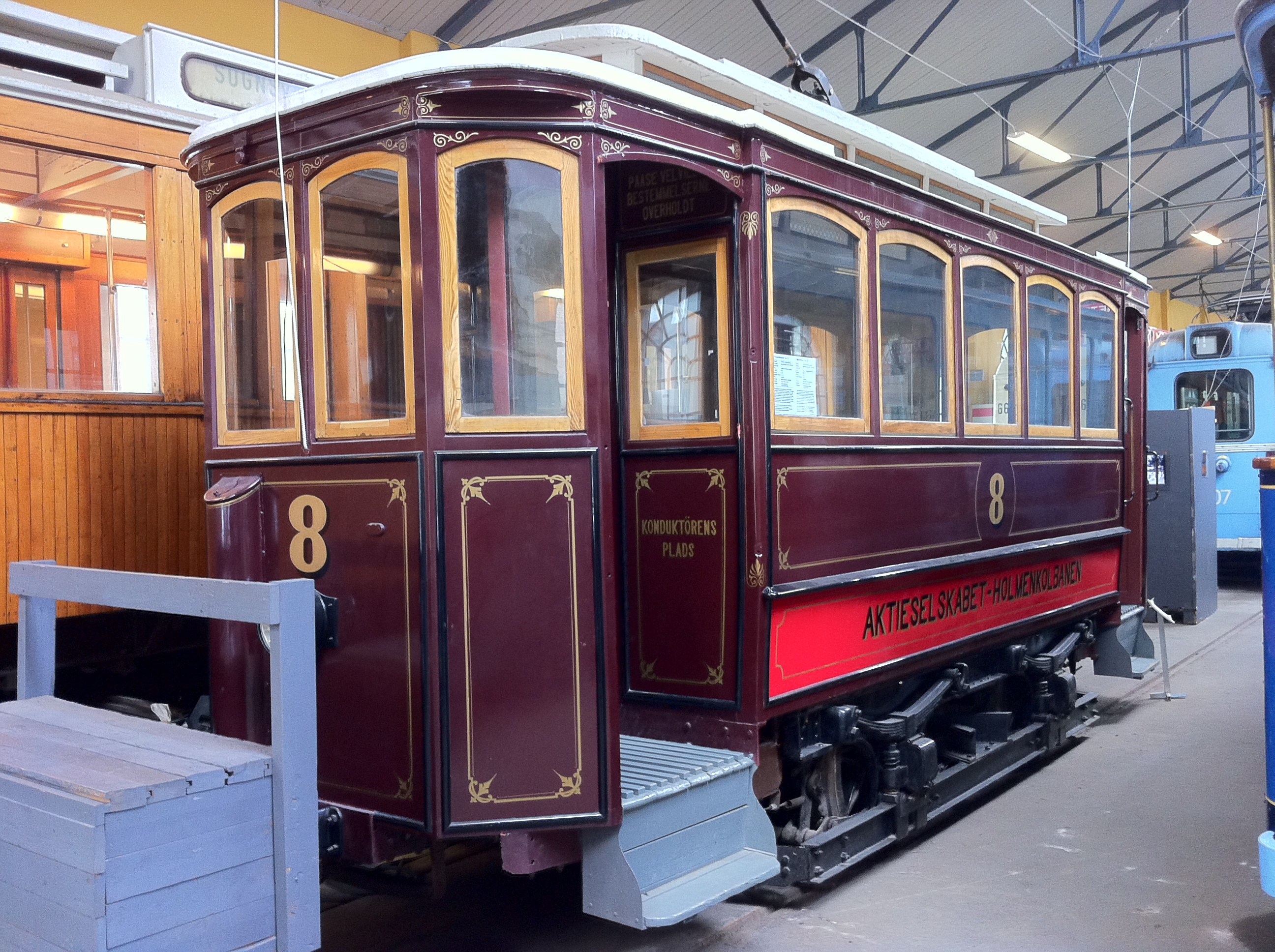

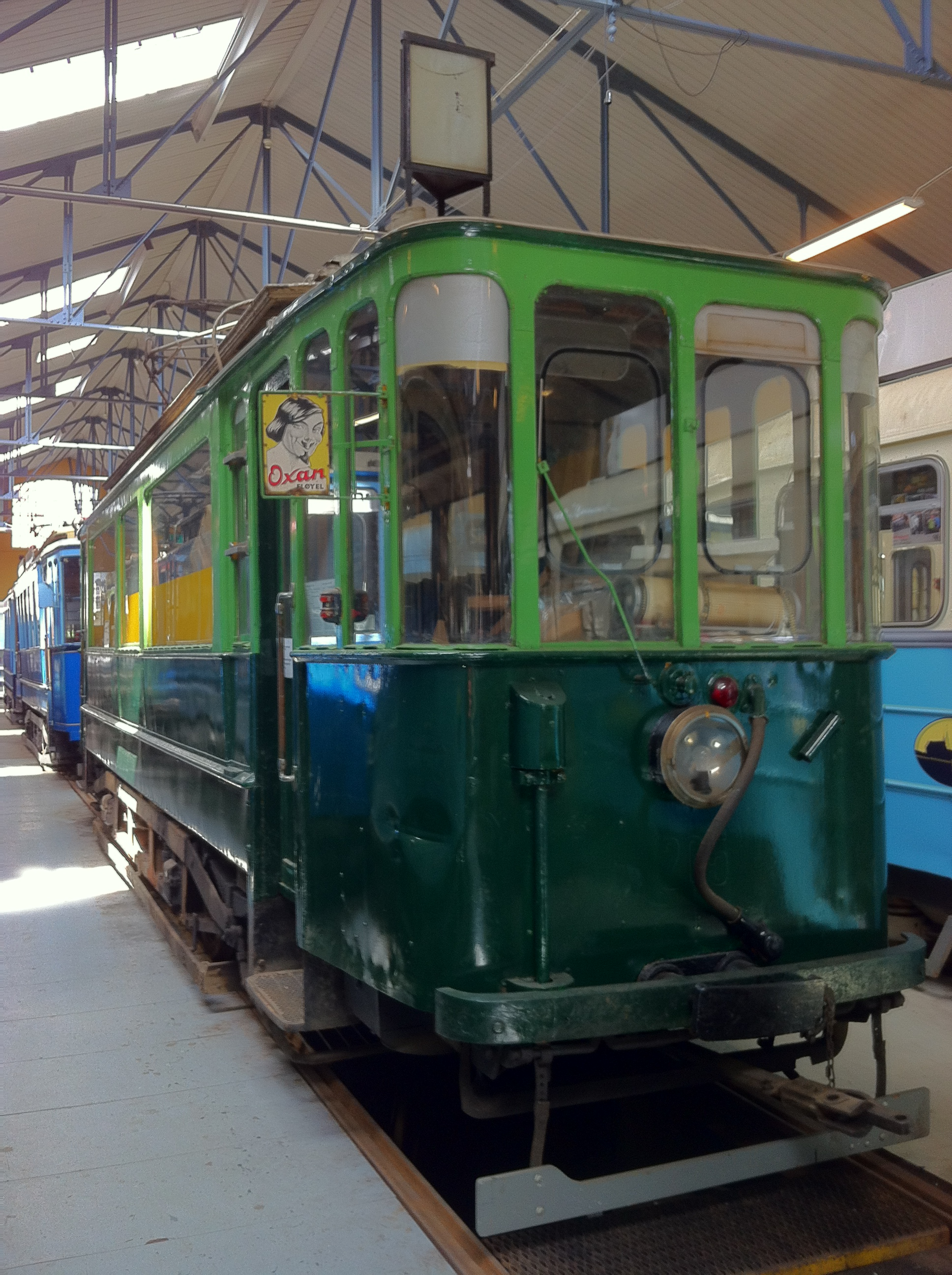

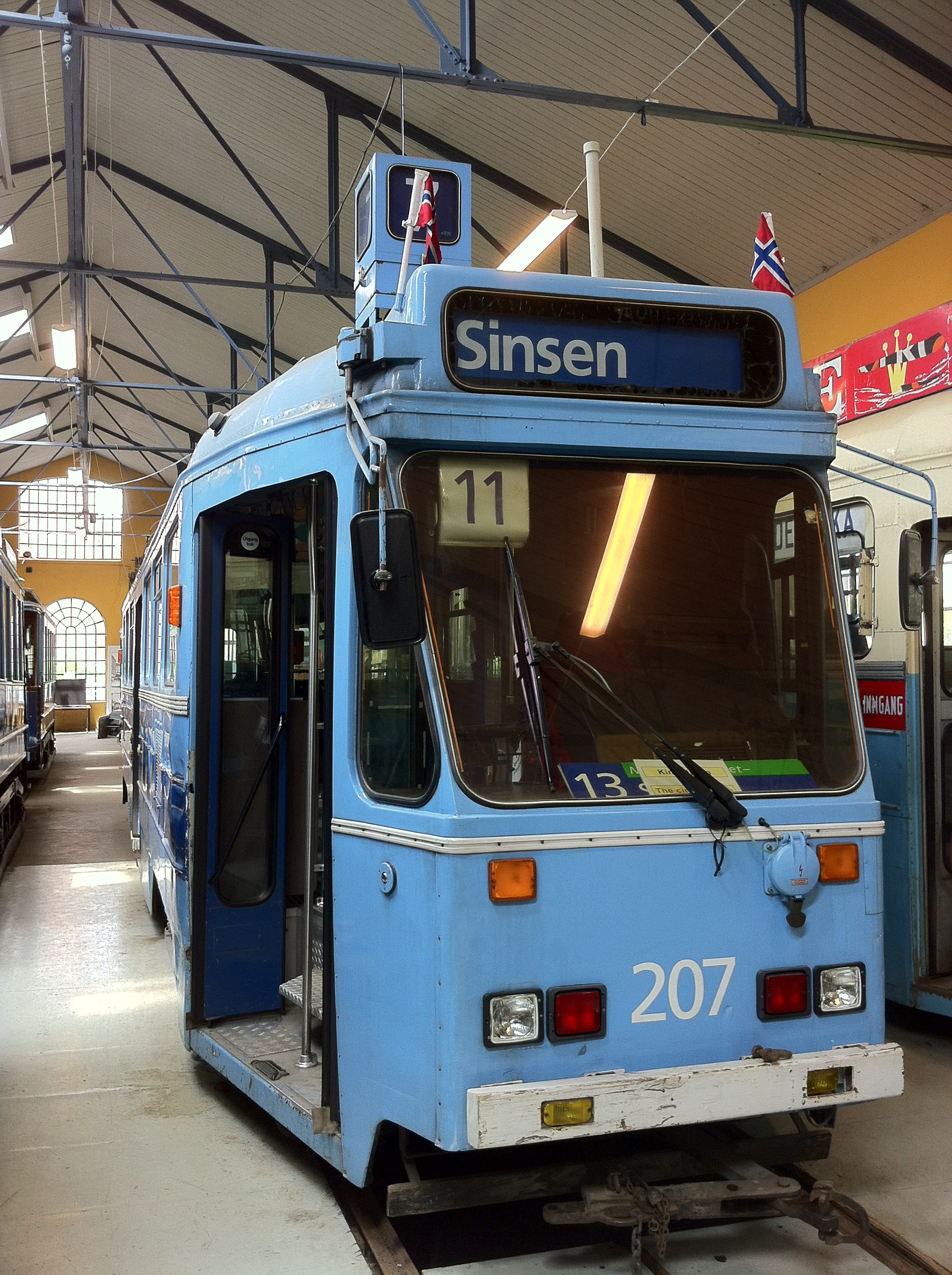

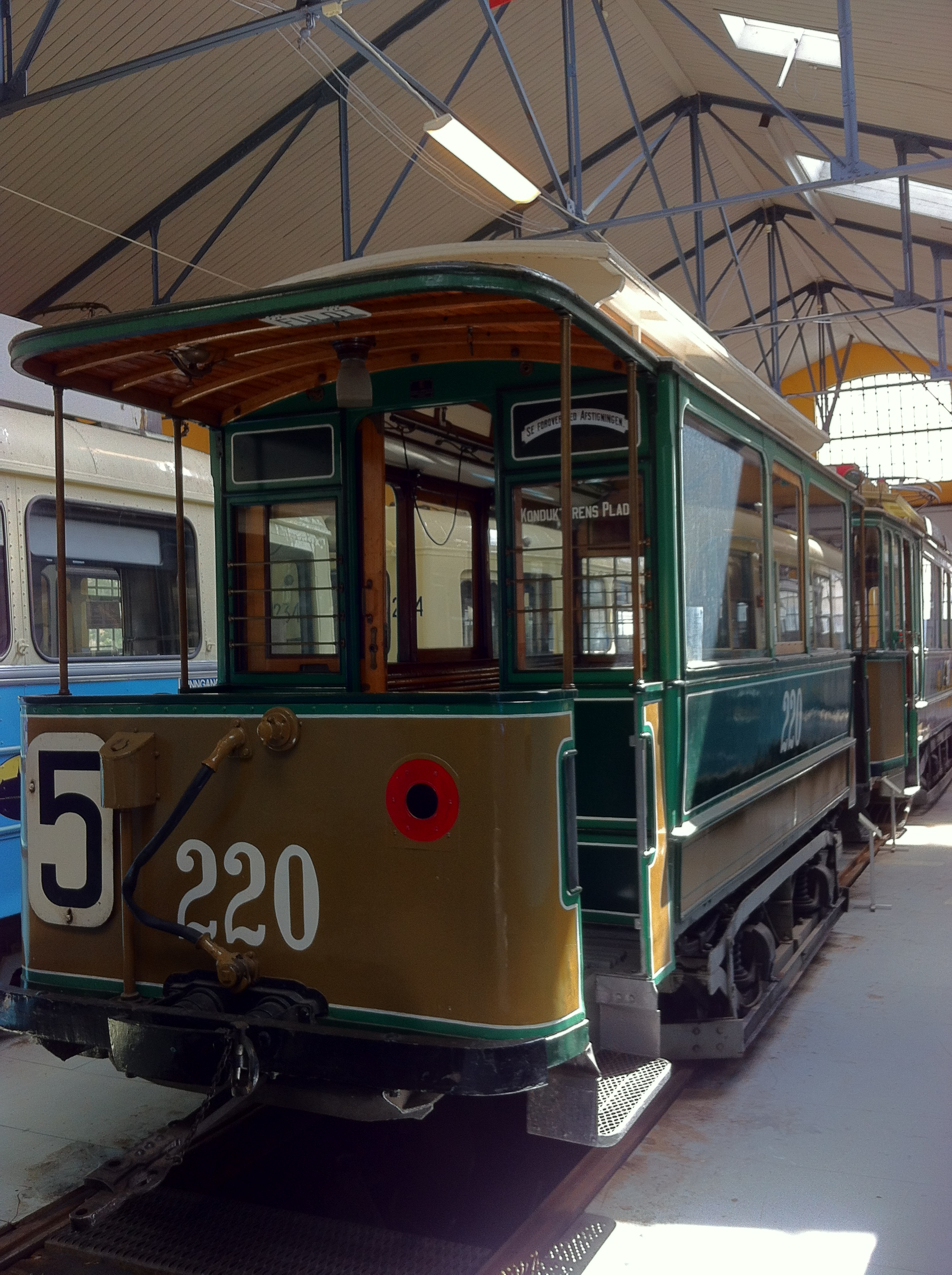

== Vinterbro ==
At Vinterbro, located just west of the amusement park Tusenfryd, the museum has built a 300 metres (980 ft), 1,435 mm (4 ft 8 1/2 in) standard gauge, heritage tramway. Construction has been under way since the 1970s. It includes the former station building of Slemdal Station, dismantled and then reassembled on site, and a Narvesen kiosk. In late 2008 the overhead wires were stolen, so that Vinterbro has been closed for public since then.
