= Simensbråten tram stop =

Tram stop in the Oslo tramway

Coordinates: 59°53′45″N 10°47′16″E

Simensbråten
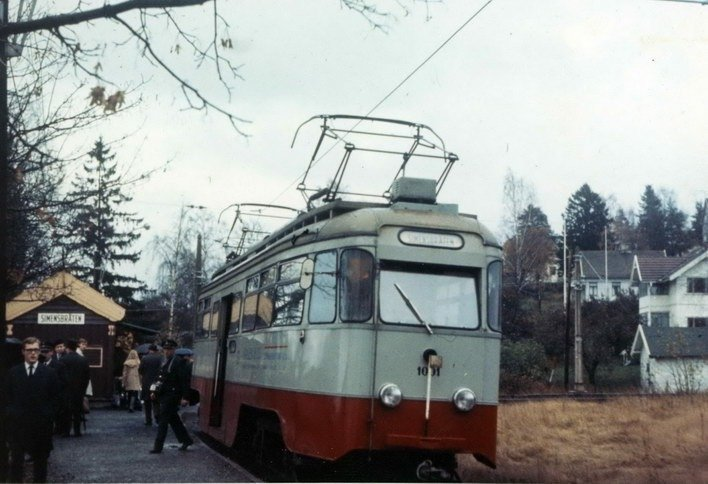
- Tram service on the last day of operation

General information
- Location: Simensbråten, Nordstrand, Oslo; Norway
- Line: Simensbråten Line

History
- Opened: 30 September 1931
- Closed: 29 October 1967
Location

Simensbråten was a light rail tram stop on the Oslo Tramway.

Located at Simensbråten in Nordstrand, it was the terminus of the Simensbråten Line which was opened in 1931 as a side branch of the Ekeberg Line. The Simensbråten Line was closed on 29 October 1967. The area is currently served by Ryen Station on the Oslo Metro.
