= Stortinget station =

Oslo metro station

Stortinget
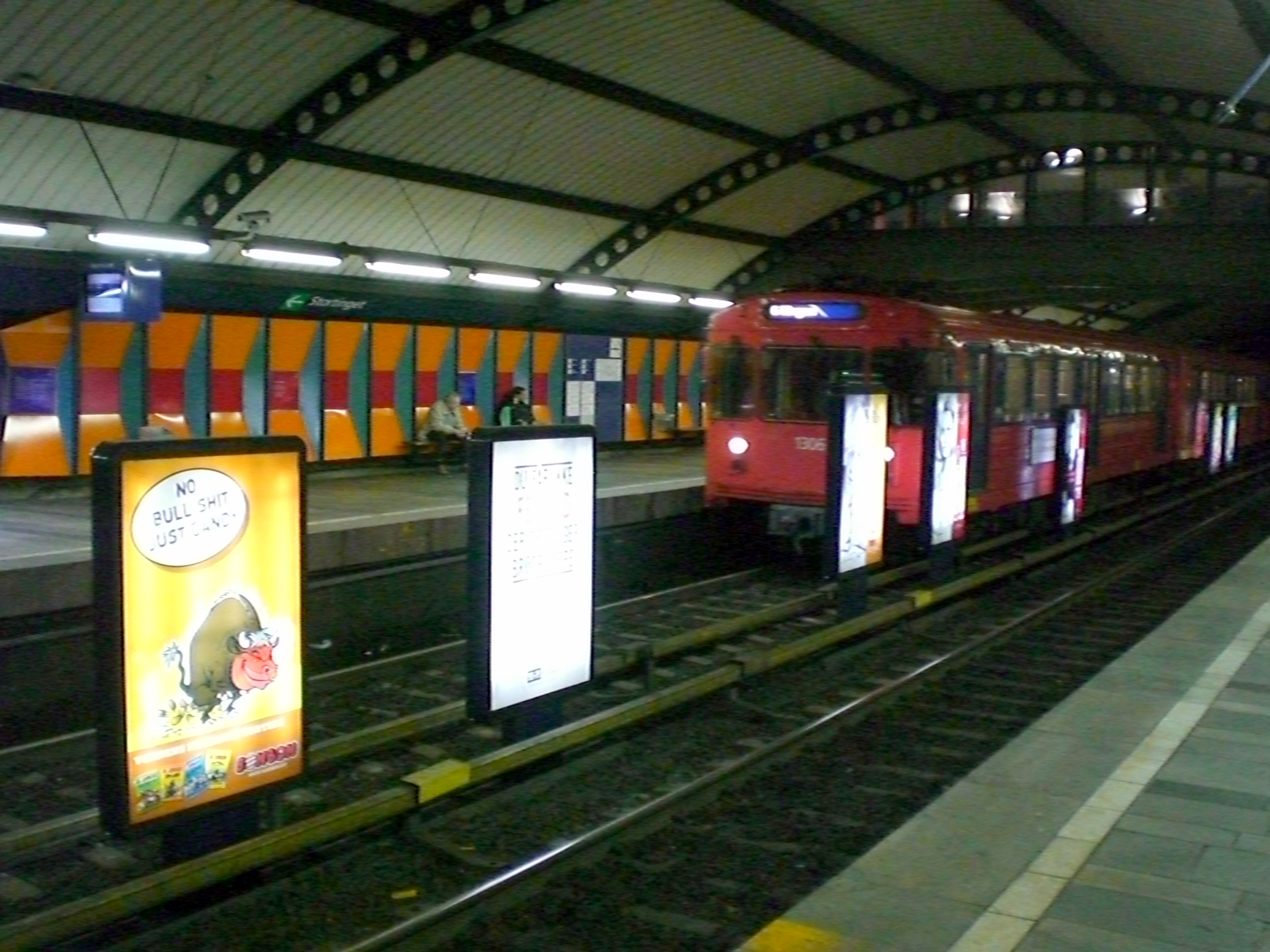

General information
- Location: Sentrum, Oslo; Norway
- Coordinates: 59°54′46″N 10°44′30″E
- Elevation: −9.0 m
- Owner: Sporveien
- Operator: Sporveien T-banen
- Line: Common Line
- Distance: 0.0
- Bus routes: From Tinghuset stop: 1N (Night bus) (Ullerntoppen - Jernbanetorget); 2N (Night bus) (Østerås T - Ellingsrudåsen T); 11N (Night bus) (Majorstuen - Kjelsås); 19N (Night bus) (Kringsjå - Åsbråten)
- Connections: Tram:

Construction
- Structure type: Underground
- Accessible: Yes

Other information
- Fare zone: Zone 1

History
- Opened: 9 January 1977; 49 years ago
- Former names: Sentrum

Services
Preceding station	Oslo Metro	Following station
Nationaltheatret towards Frognerseteren	Line 1	Jernbanetorget towards Bergkrystallen
Nationaltheatret towards Østerås	Line 2	Jernbanetorget towards Ellingsrudåsen
Nationaltheatret towards Kolsås	Line 3	Jernbanetorget towards Mortensrud
Nationaltheatret towards Vestli	Line 4	Jernbanetorget towards Bergkrystallen
Nationaltheatret towards Sognsvann	Line 5	Jernbanetorget towards Vestli
Preceding station	Trams in Oslo	Following station
Nationaltheatret towards Majorstuen	Line 11	Dronningens gate towards Kjelsås
Kontraskjæret towards Majorstuen	Line 12	Dronningens gate towards Kjelsås
Nationaltheatret towards Bekkestua	Line 13	Dronningens gate towards Ljabru
Tullinløkka towards Rikshospitalet	Line 17	Stortorvet towards Grefsen
Tullinløkka towards Rikshospitalet	Line 18	Stortorvet towards Grefsen
Tullinløkka towards Majorstuen	Line 19	Stortorvet towards Ljabru
Location

Stortinget is an underground rapid transit station on the Common Line of the Oslo Metro, Norway. It is located in the heart of the city center, next to the Parliament of Norway Building (Stortinget). The station is served by all of the five lines of the metro. At the street level, the station serves tram routes 11, 12, 13, 17, 18 and 19. Lines 11, 12 and 13 serves Øvre Slottsgate on the Vika Line while Lines 17, 18 and 19 stops at Tinghuset in the Ullevål Hageby Line. Also close to the station, there is a stop named Prof. Aschehougs gate that stops line FB5 to Oslo Airport, Gardermoen. Stortinget is 'kilometer marker zero' for the metro network and is owned by Sporveien T-banen.

There has been a tram stop at Tinghuset since the opening of the Oslo Tramway, in 1875. The rapid transit station opened as Sentrum in 1977, and was connected to the eastern network of the metro. It was forced to close in 1983 due to leaks. It took the new name following the 1987 re-opening; this time it was also connected to the western network. The station has four platforms; originally two were used for the eastern trains and two for the western ones. Since 1993, trains have passed through the station.

== History ==
The first underground railway to serve Oslo was the extension of the Holmenkoll Line to Nationaltheatret in 1928. The company, Holmenkolbanen, had plans for further extensions into the heart of the city, but high costs during the construction of the initial tunnel hampered progress. In 1954, the Parliament of Norway decided to build a rapid transit system for Oslo. Four lines to the east of the city would be built, and in 1966 the section from Tøyen to Jernbanetorget opened by Oslo Sporveier. Jernbanetorget was located adjacent to Oslo East Station, the main railway station serving Oslo. However, the eastern lines also did not extend into the core of the central business district of the capital.

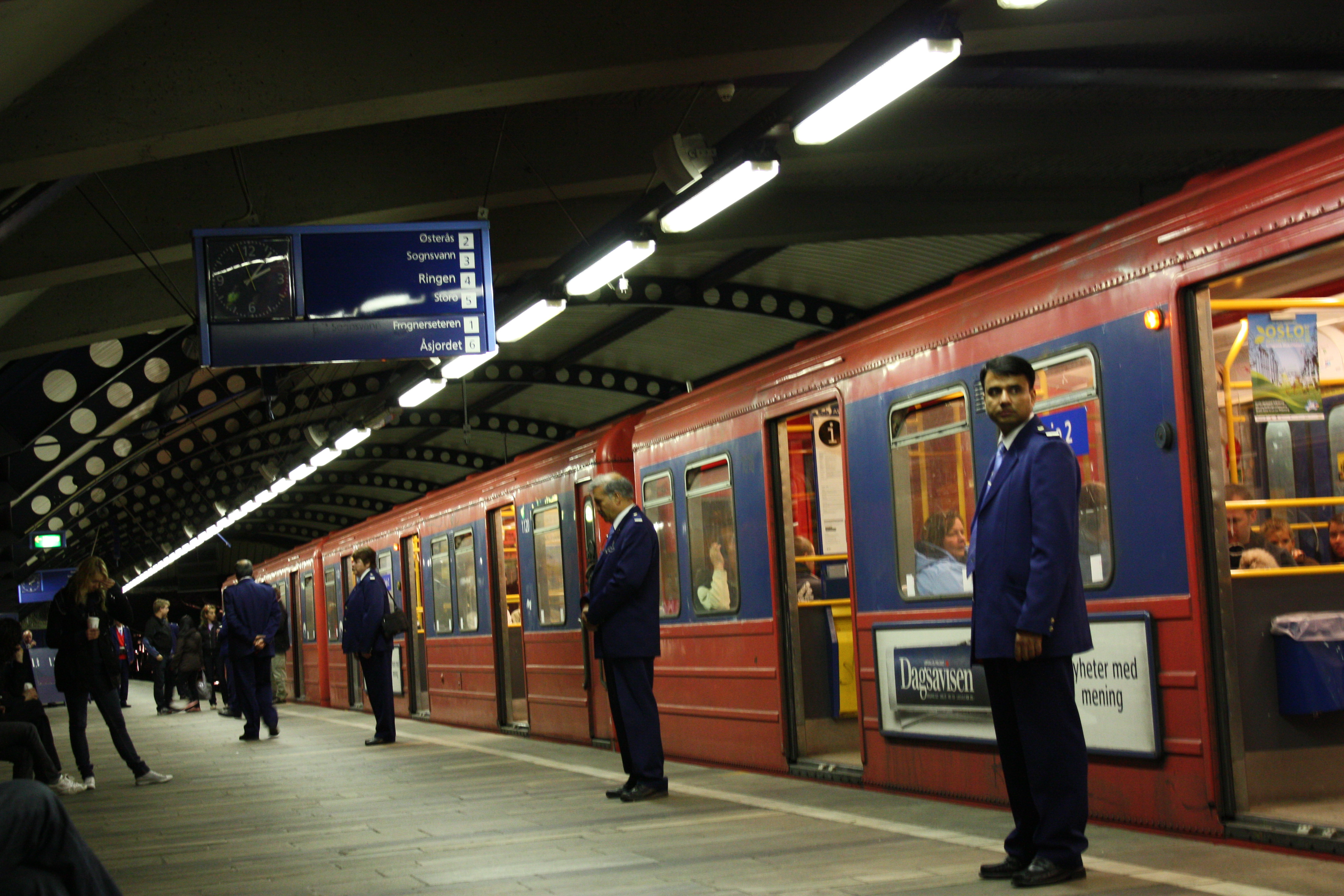
Ticket inspection at Stortinget

During the 1960s, the Oslo Tunnel was being planned to connect the Drammen Line to Oslo East Station. This would make the West Station unnecessary, and would allow a central station to be built at the location of the East Station. The tunnel was planned to run in a similar route as would be necessary to connect Jernbanetorget to Nationaltheatret, and a railway station was planned to connect to Nationaltheatret. Simultaneously, Oslo Sporveier worked with possibilities to connect their eastern and western networks, and get both into the city core. During the 1960s, the planning office for the metro proposed to build a connecting tunnel between Nationaltheatret and Jernbanetorget. However, the initial plans involved creating a station close to Nationaltheatret, named for Slottsparken, which would serve as the transfer point between the two systems. This station had a planned dimension to hold 25,000 people.

At the time, the western and eastern networks were incompatible; in addition to different platform heights, the eastern network used six-car trains with a third-rail power supply, while the western network used overhead wires and two-car trains. The initial plans were met with criticism, following media's discovery that the main planners had not consulted several hired specialists, and that alternatives to the preferred route had not been made. As a consequence, several engineers working for the Norwegian State Railways made two alternative suggestion for the route. By 1975, the plans were changed so Nationaltheatret would become the transfer station, by building a balloon loop for the eastern trains, while the western trains would terminate as before. This solution would allow the two networks to be connected later. In 1978, the city planner discarded the proposal from Oslo Sporveier to build a new station at Slottsparken, and instead decided that Stortinget would become the interchange between the two systems. This would allow the western network to later be upgraded to metro standard and allow through trains. The proposal was supported by all political parties except the Labour Party.

The decision to build Sentrum Station was taken by the city council on 22 May 1969; the decision also involved that the transfer station be placed at Slottsparken/Nationaltheatret. Construction started in 1972, and the first leaks were revealed. By the time the station opened on 9 January 1977, the leaks had not been removed. During trials in January, it turned out that the tracks were too low for all types of trains to be able to open their doors, causing the tracks to have to be raised. By 1978, the contractor and the municipality felt that the leaks were under control, and the municipality took over the station. In February 1983, the station was closed to finally remove all leaks. At the time, it was expected that the station could reopen in 1984. The leakages were caused by two sources: the use of the wrong type of concrete, and the wrong construction method. These were specified correctly in the tender contracts, but after the contractor was chosen, an agreement was made between the municipality and Selmer for the use of the membrane method. Combined with the inferior quality of concrete, the leaks were unavoidable. In 1986, the municipality sued Selmer for the 158 million kr it cost to repair the station.

The station reopened on 7 March 1987, with the new name Stortinget. The name derives from the Parliament of Norway (Norwegian: Stortinget) that is adjacent to the station. The Common Tunnel was completed, and the trains from the western network terminated where at the old platforms, where the eastern trains had previously terminated. The eastern trains instead operated through a balloon loop. The station featured a step-free walk between the two systems. With the opening of Stortinget, the metro network was declared finished, after the last extension on the Furuset Line to Ellingsrudåsen had been made in 1981. After the opening of Stortinget, only seven new station have opened: Mortensrud (1998), Forskningsparken (1999), Nydalen, Storo (both 2003), Sinsen, Husebybakken (both 2006) and Løren (2016). In 1993, the Sognsvann Line and the Common Tunnel were rebuilt to metro standard, and the first through trains started operating on both sides of Stortinget. By 1995, also the Røa Line was upgraded, and all lines started operating through Stortinget.

== Facilities ==
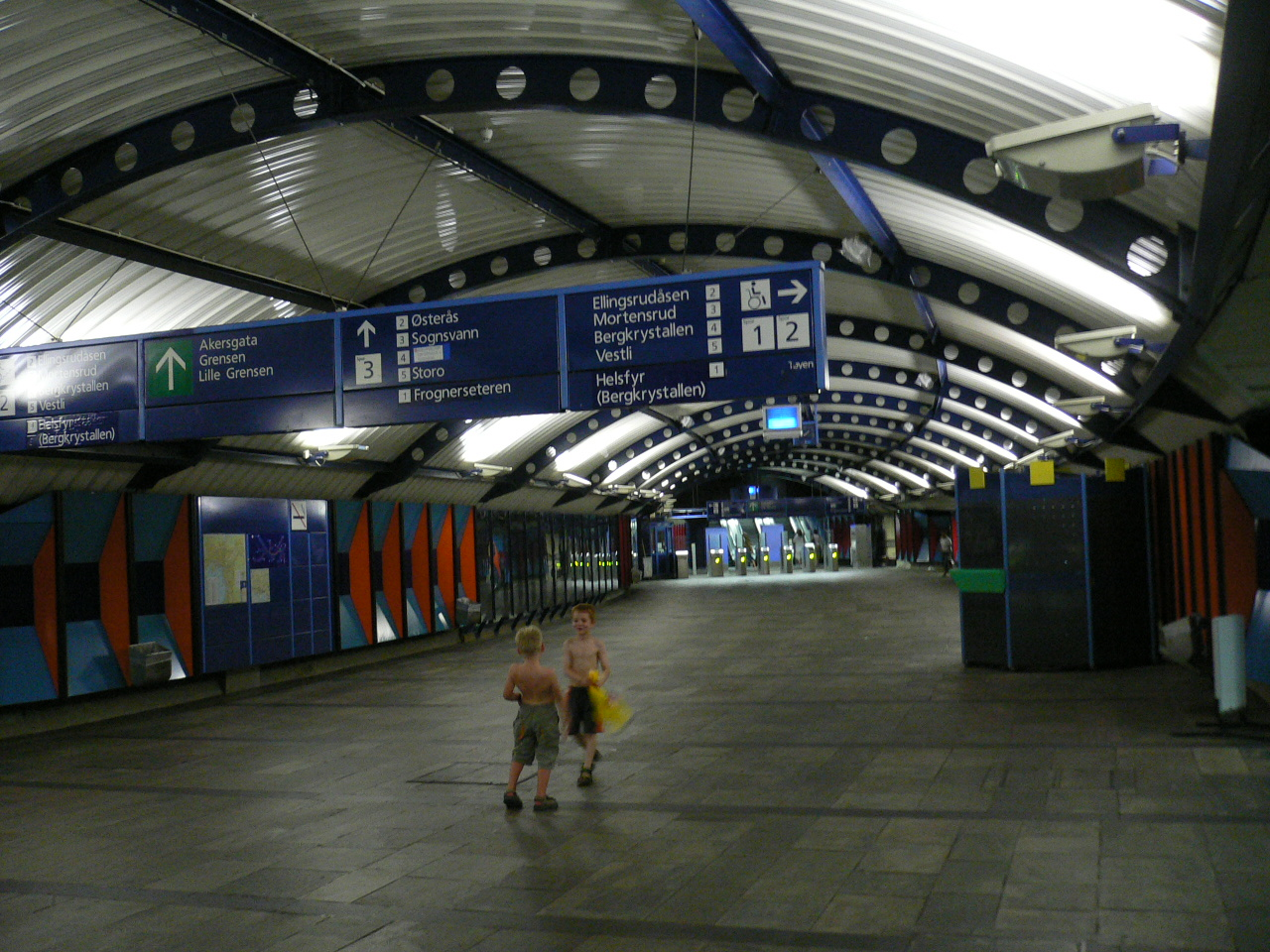
The hall leading to the platform

Stortinget has four platforms. Most regular trains which travel through the city center use the main platforms which were formerly used only for trains on the western side of the network. At each side is a platform for trains from the east terminating at Stortinget. Before the lines were joined these platforms were used by all trains on the eastern part of the network, but they are now used mainly for extra trains on lines 2 and 3 running Stortinget-Mortensrud (Line 3) and Stortinget-Ellingsrudåsen (Line 2).A loop which passes underneath the main track connects the two side platforms, allowing the trains to turn without having to reverse direction. The stations Øvre Slottsgate and Tinghuset of the Oslo tramway are close to the station entrances making it possible to transfer to all the tramway lines for example Line 13.

== Service ==
Stortinget is served by all five lines of the Oslo Metro. The station is considered the heart of the system, and is 'kilometer marker zero' for measuring all distances. All services have a 15-minute headway. The metro is operated by Oslo T-banedrift on contract with Ruter.

The trams running through Grensen and Pilestredet serve the tram stop Tinghuset (the courthouse) next to one of the Metro entrances. The stop is served by lines 17, 18 and 19 of the Oslo Tramway. Westwards, line 17 and 18 operate along the Ullevål Hageby Line to Rikshospitalet; travel time is 16 minutes. Line 19 branches off onto the Homansbyen Line to Majorstuen. Eastwards, line 19 operates via Bjørvika to Ljabru. Line 17 operates via Sinsen to Grefsen, with a travel time of 17 minutes. Line 18 operates to Grefsen via the Grünerløkka–Torshov Line, with a travel time of 24 minutes. Øvre Slottsgate is also next to one of the Metro entrances. The stop is served by lines 11, 12 and 13. Westwards, Line 11 operate along the Briskeby Line to Majorstuen. Line 12 branches off and run via Aker Brygge in the Vika Line and operate along the Frogner Line to Majorstuen. Line 13 runs via the Skøyen Line to Lilleaker and Bekkestua. Eastwards, lines 11 and 12 runs via the Grünerløkka–Torshov Line to Kjelsås. Line 13 runs via the Bjørvika Line and the Ekerberg Line to Ljabru. Oslo Tramway is operated by Oslo Sporvognsdrift on contract with Ruter.
