= Munkegata tram stop =

Former tram stop in Oslo, Norway

Munkegata
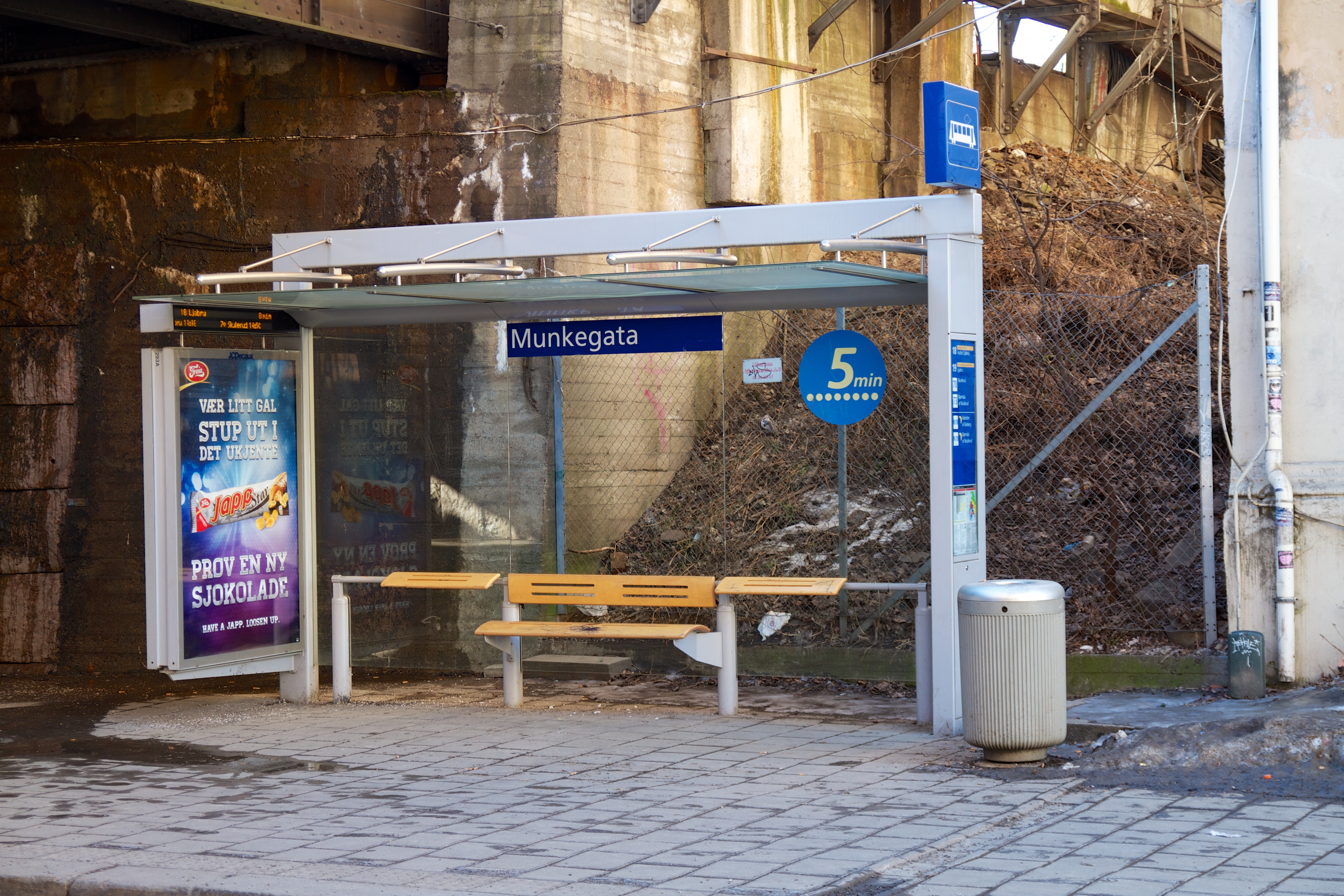
- Munkegata, March 2013

General information
- Location: Gamlebyen, Oslo; Norway
- Coordinates: 59.9059°N 10.7677°E
- Line: Gamleby Line

History
- Opened: 6 October 1875
- Closed: 27 September 2020
Location

Munkegata was a tram stop on the Gamleby Line of the Oslo Tramway. It is located at the intersection of Oslo gate and Schweigaards gate in Gamlebyen, Oslo, Norway.

The station opened on 6 October 1875 as part of the Gamleby Line extension to Oslo Hospital by Kristiania Sporveisselskab. The station was served by lines 18 and 19, which used both SL79 and SL95 trams. It was closed in late 2020, when the Gamleby Line was shifted to run through Bjørvika.

Preceding station	Trams in Oslo	Following station
Bussterminalen Grønland towards Rikshospitalet	Line 18	St Halvards plass towards Ljabru
Bussterminalen Grønland towards Majorstuen	Line 19	St Halvards plass towards Ljabru
