= St Halvards plass tram stop =

Former tram stop in Oslo, Norway

St Halvards plass
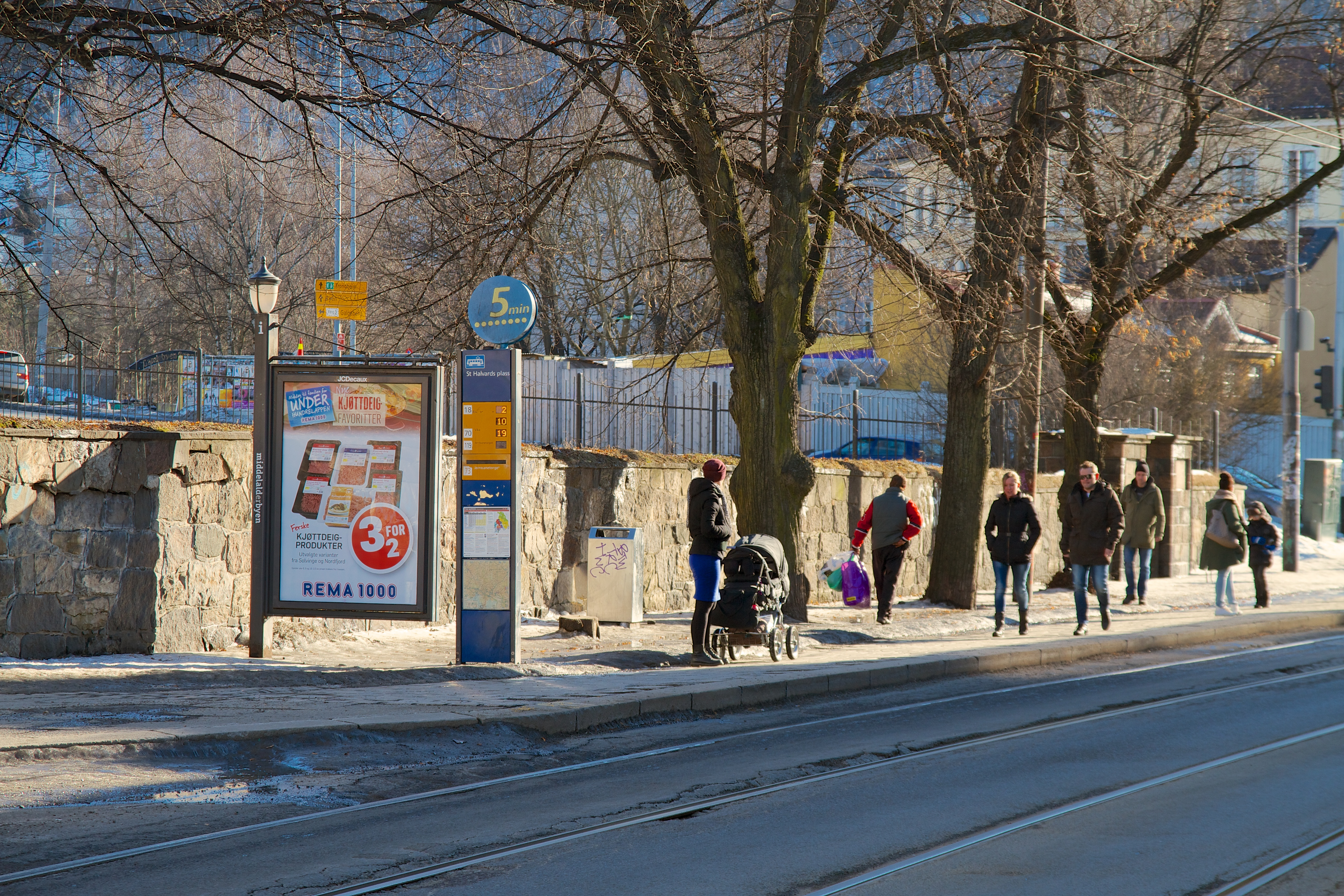
- St Halvards plass, March 2013

General information
- Location: Gamlebyen, Oslo; Norway
- Coordinates: 59.9059°N 10.7677°E
- Line: Gamleby Line
- Tracks: Double
- Bus routes: 34, 70, 70N

Other information
- Status: Closed

History
- Opened: 6 October 1875
- Closed: 27 September 2020
Location

St Halvards plass was a tram stop on the Gamleby Line of the Oslo Tramway. It was located at the square St Halvards plass, on the intersection of Oslo gate and Bispegata in Gamlebyen, Oslo, Norway.

The station opened on 6 October 1875 as part of the Gamleby Line extension to Oslo Hospital by Kristiania Sporveisselskab. The station was served by lines 18 and 19, and before its closure, used both SL79 and SL95 trams. The nearest tram station is Middelalderparken. Nonetheless, St. Halvards plass is still in use as a bus stop.

Preceding station	Trams in Oslo	Following station
Munkegata towards Rikshospitalet	Line 18	Oslo Hospital towards Ljabru
Munkegata towards Majorstuen	Line 19	Oslo Hospital towards Ljabru
