= Nordberg Church (Oslo) =

- Nordberg kirke
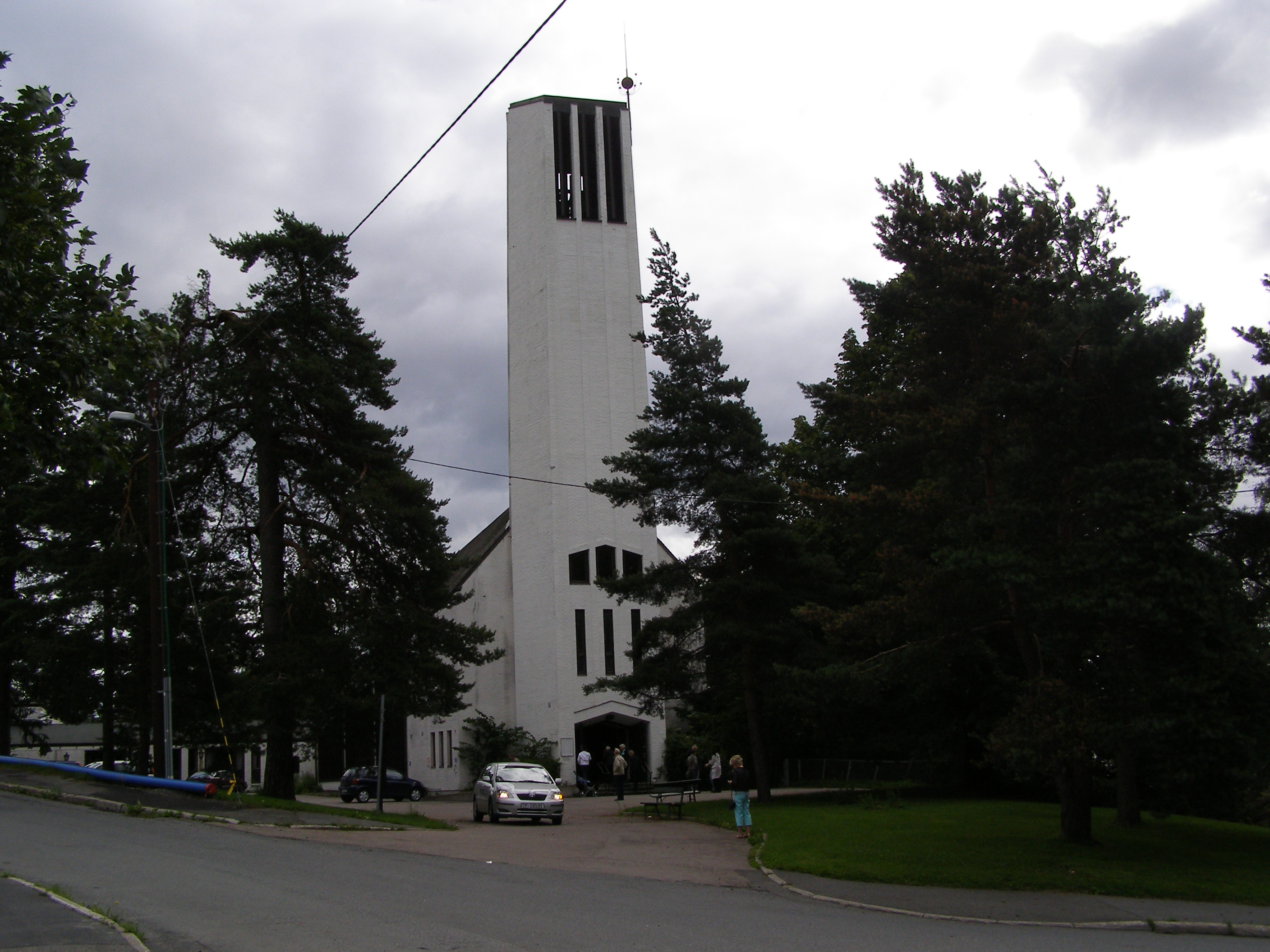

- Location within Oslo Location within Norway
- 59°57′46.4″N 10°44′32.1″E
- Location: Kringsjågrenda 1, Oslo,
- Country: Norway
- Denomination: Church of Norway
- Churchmanship: Evangelical Lutheran
- Website: Parish of Nordberg

History
- Status: Parish church
- Consecrated: 1962

Architecture
- Functional status: Active
- Architect(s): Turid and Kristen Bernhoff Evensen

Specifications
- Capacity: 620 seats
- Materials: Mud brick and concrete

Administration
- Diocese: Diocese of Oslo
- Parish: Nordberg

Nordberg Church is a hexagonal church, located in the neighbourhood of Nordberg in Oslo, Norway.

The church was completed in 1962 and was restored and expanded with a church parlor in 1982. The facade is in white bricks and has a characteristic church tower which can be seen from large parts of the city of Oslo. It is one of the largest churches in the city.

The altar tapestry, The Resurrection, was made by Kari-Bjørg Ile. It came into place in 1992. The pulpit and the baptismal font are made according to the architects' drawings. The current church organ from 2015 is a digital organ of the type Johannus Monarke Präludium.

There are two church bells from Olsen Nauen Bell Foundry in the church tower.

Outside the church is a log house, a former chapel used for the church's nursery.

The church is listed by the Norwegian Directorate for Cultural Heritage and protected by Norwegian law.
