= Holstein (station) =

Oslo metro station

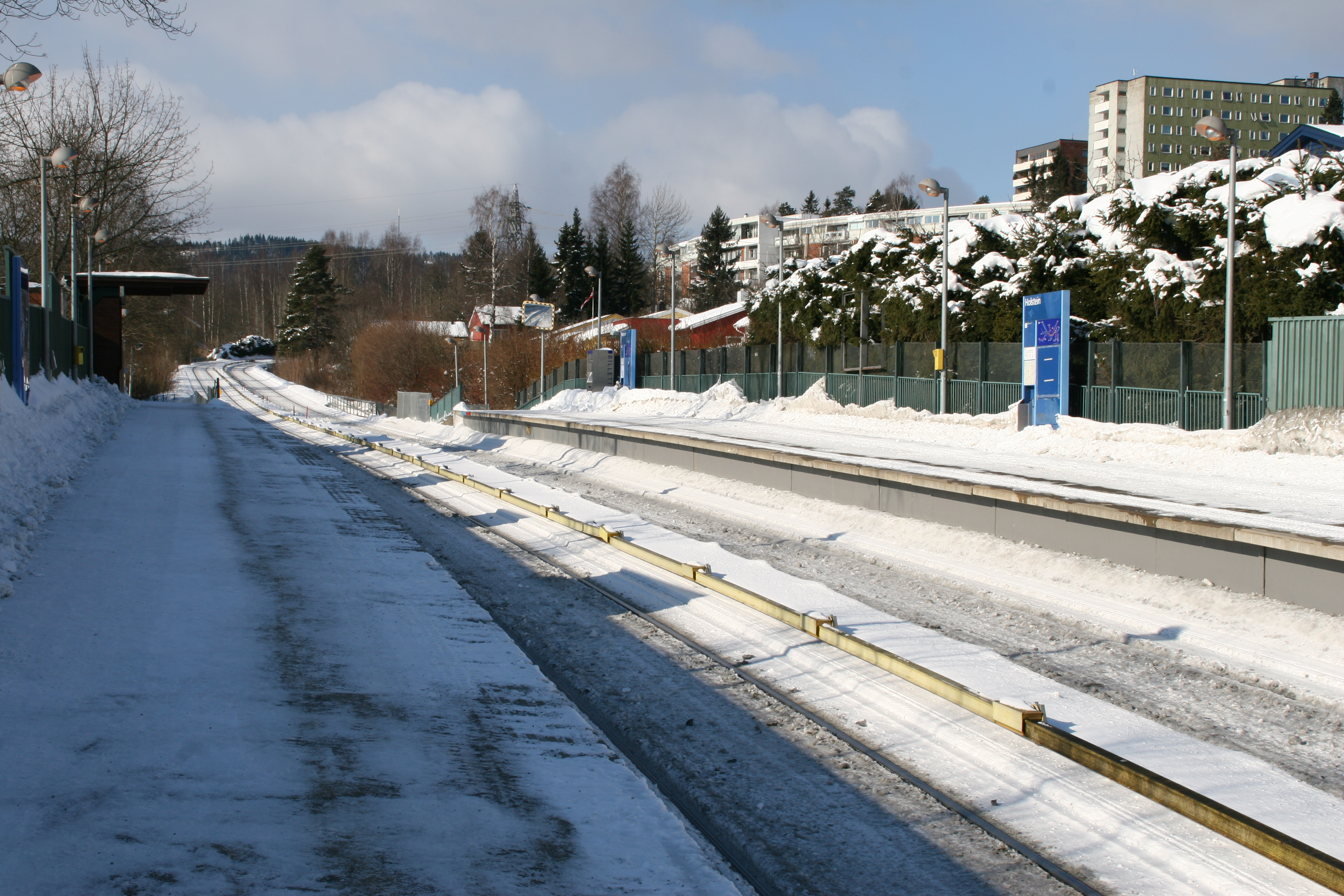

General information
- Location: Nordberg, Oslo; Norway
- Coordinates: 59°57′38″N 10°44′24″E
- Owner: Sporveien
- Operator: Sporveien T-banen
- Line: Sognsvann Line
- Distance: 7.8 km (4.8 mi) from Stortinget
- Connections: Bus service: 22 Majorstuen – Ellingsrudåsen; 25 Majorstuen – Karihaugen

Construction
- Structure type: At-grade
- Accessible: Yes

History
- Opened: 1941

Services
Preceding station	Oslo Metro	Following station
Kringsjå towards Sognsvann	Line 5	Østhorn towards Ring Line and Vestli
Location

Holstein is a station on the Sognsvann Line (line 5) of the Oslo Metro in Norway. The station is located between Kringsjå and Østhorn stations. Holstein was opened during the Second World War, in 1941. Formerly Nordberg was the next southbound station, but it was closed in 1992, at the same time as Holstein was re-built with longer platforms and new ticket machines. The name Holstein is believed to origin from Schleswig-Holstein in Germany.

== History ==
The Sognsvann Line opened on 10 October 1934. It was built by Akersbanerne, and ran from Majorstuen to Sognsvann station. The line was double-tracked from Majorstuen to Korsvoll, and single-tracked from there to Sognsvann. In 1939, the section Korsvoll–Sognsvann was upgraded to double tracks, and the station Korsvoll had its name changed to Østhorn. Two years later, Holstein was opened, although the accurate date of opening remains undisclosed.

In 1990, it was decided to upgrade the Sognsvann Line to metro standard, which involves a heightening and lengthening of the platforms, installation of third rail power supply and a new signaling system. Many residents feared that Holstein station would be closed together with Frøen, but only the latter was closed. The upgrade started three years later, when Tåsen station was moved 150 metres (490 ft) further north, and Nordberg Station was closed. Holstein was closed for traffic during the construction period. Underpasses were built at both Holstein and Nordberg stations, and new ticket machines were installed at Holstein.

== Service ==
Holstein is served by the line 5 on the Sognsvann Line, operated by Oslo T-banedrift on contract with Ruter. The rapid transit serves the station every 15 minutes, except in the late evening and on weekend mornings, when there is a 30-minute headway. Travel time along the 7.1-kilometre (4.4 mi) portion to Stortinget in the city center is 13 minutes.

The station provides correspondence to the bus lines 22 and 25 in Carl Kjeldsens vei, a two minutes walk away.

== Facilities ==
Holstein has two platforms, each with a wooden shed. The sheds are designed by Arne Henriksen in a minimalist and standardised style with constructions of wood and steel. Located between the streets Kongleveien and Holsteinveien, the station serves the residential area Nordberg. There is a kindergarten and a senior center close to the station.

The origin of the station's name is disputed. Professor H. O. Christophersen stated in 1952 that it origined from the German region Holstein. Journalist Arvid Sagen stated in 2001 that the name owed its origins to the Norwegian word "hole"; which means a round hill, and "stein", which means stone.
