= Bjørvika Line =

Tram line in Oslo, Norway

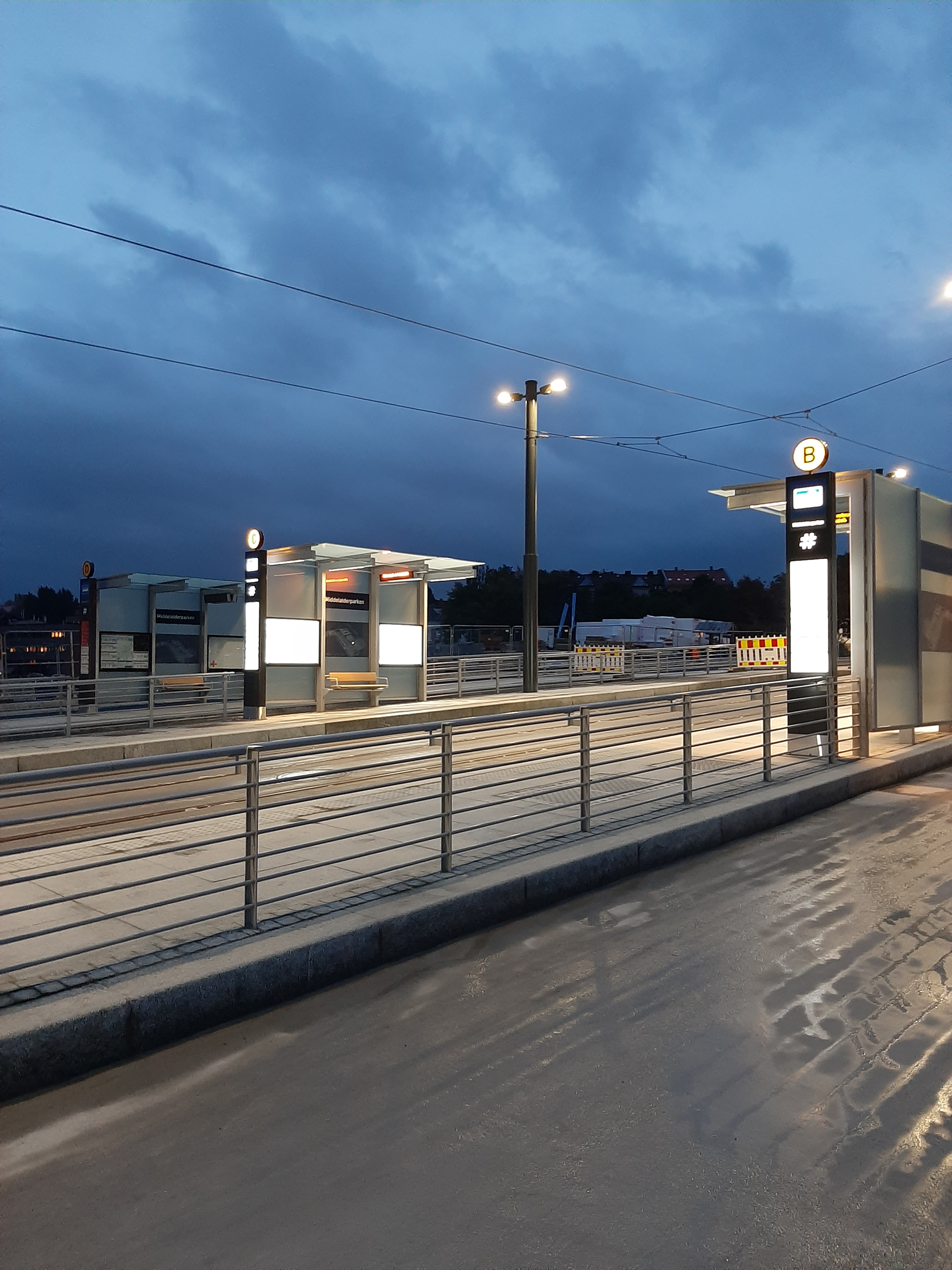
- Middelalderparken Station on Bjørvika Line

Overview
- Native name: Bjørvikalinjen
- Status: Operating
- Owner: Sporveien
- Locale: Oslo, Norway
- Termini: Dronningens gate; Oslo Hospital

Service
- Type: Tramway
- System: Oslo Tramway
- Operator(s): Sporveien Trikken
- Rolling stock: SL79 and SL95

History
- Planned opening: 2018
- Opened: 4 October 2020

Technical
- Number of tracks: Double

The Bjørvika Line is a tram line that runs through both Sentrum and Gamleby in Oslo. It opened as a rerouting of the Gamleby Line. The former route was closed down on the same day of this line's opening. It has two stops, Bjørvika and Middelalderparken. It runs along Dronning Eufemias gate and Bispegata, instead of through Schweigaards gate and Munkegata. It is served by lines 13 and 19. Line 13 operates between Bekkestua and Ljabru, while Line 19 operates between Majorstuen and Ljabru.

== History ==
The section in Dronning Eufemias gate was constructed in the early 2010s and ready in 2015. In 2017 and 2018, due to construction work in the area between Holbergs plass and Tinghuset, trams on line 17 and 18 terminated at Bjørvika. However, the section between Bjørvika and Oslo Hospital, was only completed in 2021. The reason for this is the construction of the Follo Line project. On the opening date, City Councilor for the Environment and Transport, Lan Marie Berg, had the honour of opening the new route.

== Route ==
It starts from Dronningens gate tram stop, through Prinsens gate and past the Bjørvika Public Library. It goes along Dronning Eufemias gate until it stops at Bjørvika. Afterwards, it follows down Dronning Eufemias gate through Bispegata before heading to Middelalderparken. From Middelalderparken, it continues through Bispegata and Oslo gate before merging with the Ekeberg Line at Oslo Hospital.

== See also ==
- Bjørvika
- Bjørvika tram stop
- Gamleby Line
- Middelalderparken tram stop
