= Kringsjå (station) =

Oslo metro station

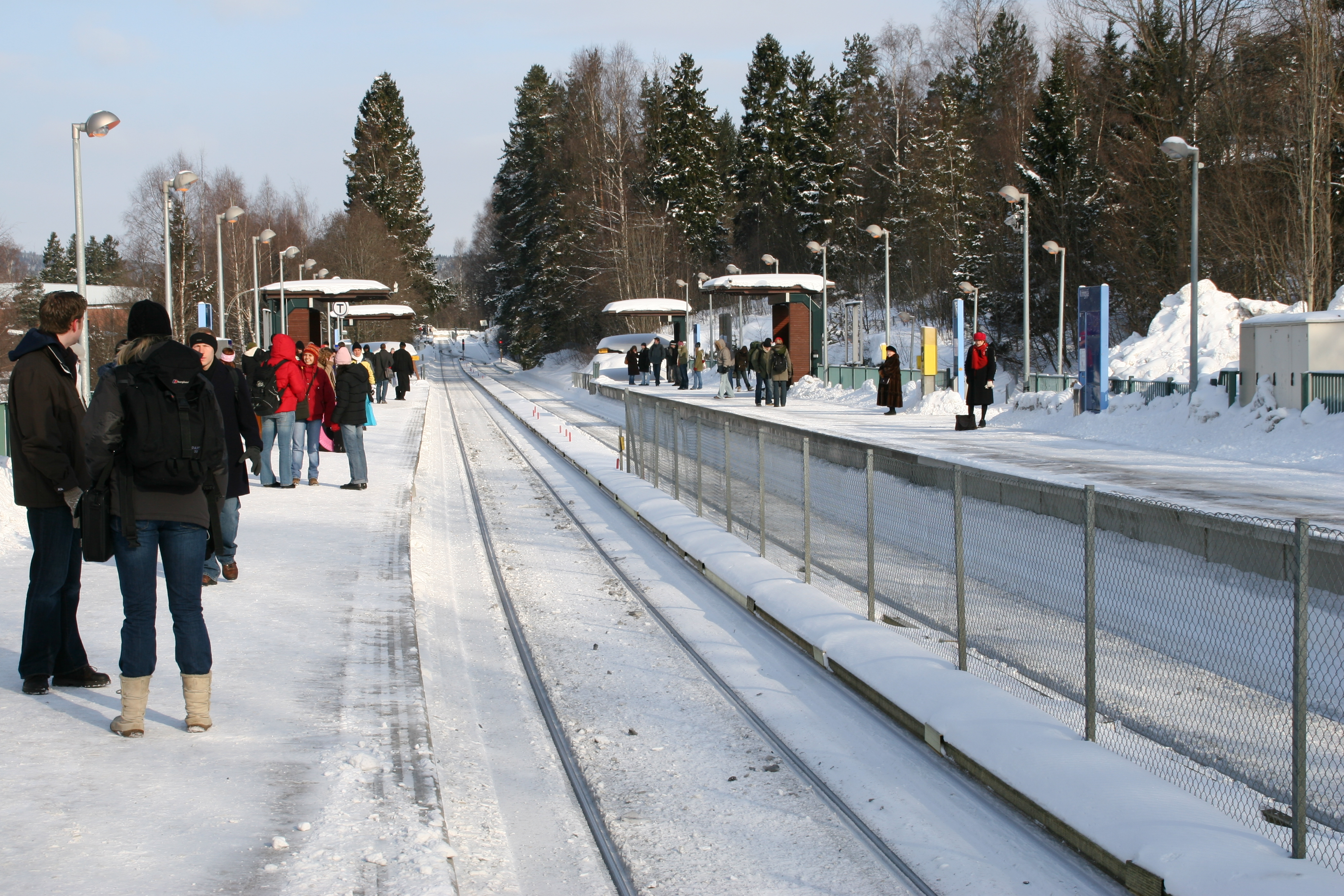

General information
- Location: Kringsjå, Nordre Aker, Oslo; Norway
- Coordinates: 59°57′49″N 10°44′5″E
- Owner: Sporveien
- Operator: Sporveien T-banen
- Line: Sognsvann Line
- Distance: 8.4 km (5.2 mi) from Stortinget
- Platforms: 2 side platforms

Construction
- Structure type: At-grade
- Accessible: Yes

Other information
- Fare zone: 1

History
- Opened: 10 October 1934
- Rebuilt: 1993

Services
Preceding station	Oslo Metro	Following station
Sognsvann Terminus	Line 5 Sognsvann Line	Holstein towards Vestli
Location

Kringsjå is a rapid transit station of the Oslo Metro's Sognsvann Line. It is situated Kringsjå neighborhood of the Oslo, Norway, borough of Nordre Aker. Located 8.4 kilometers (5.2 mi) from Stortinget, the station is served by Line 5 of the metro every fifteen minutes. Travel time to Stortinget is fifteen minutes.

The station opened on 10 October 1934 at the same times as the rest of the Sognsvann Line. The station received a major upgrade in 1993, in which it received longer platforms and an overpass. The new station was designed by Arne Henriksen. Among the most used stations west of the city center, it derives its high ridership from two student dormitory complexes.

== History ==
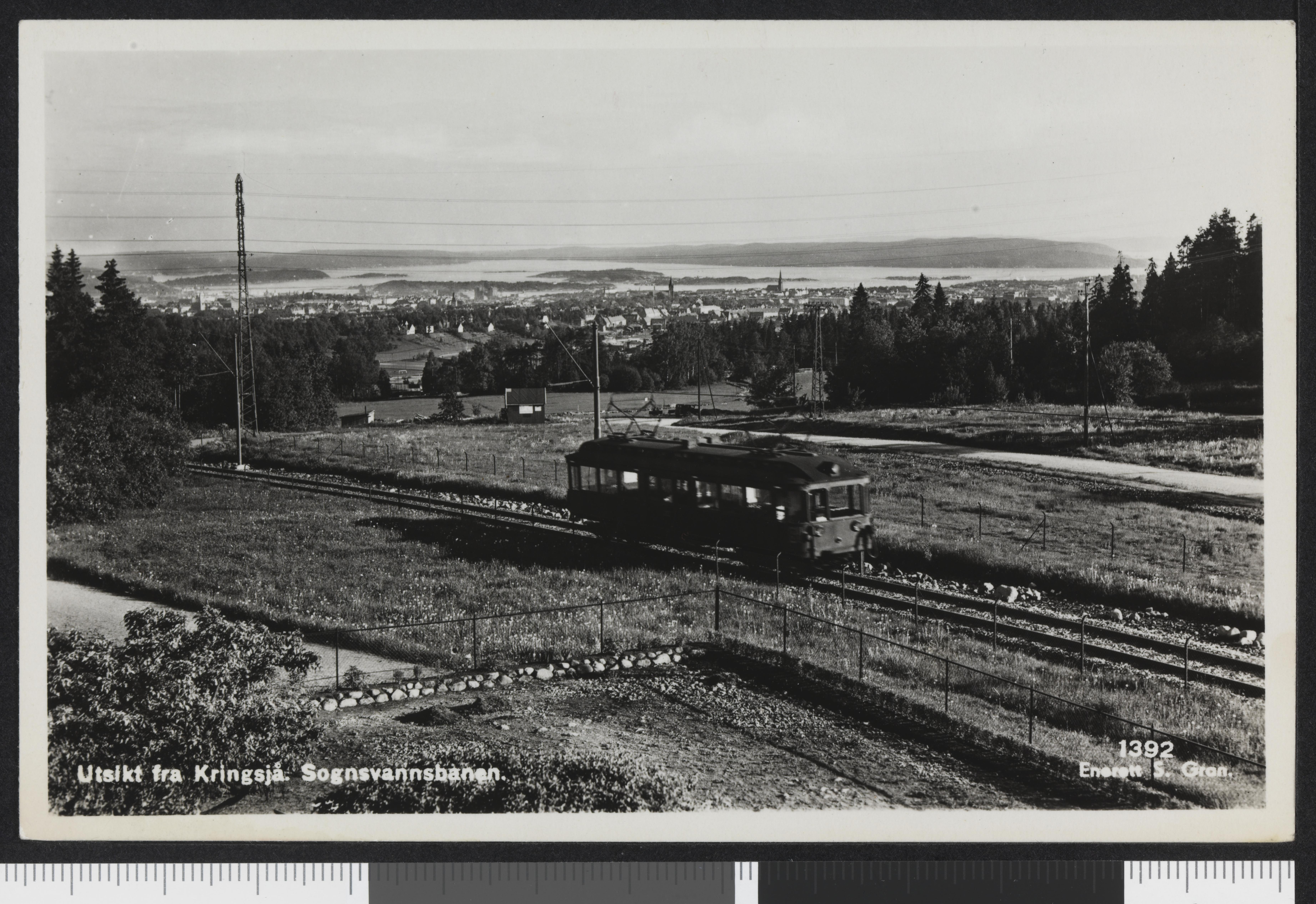
Tram at Kringsjå before the double track was installed in 1939

Construction of the Sognsvann Line started in 1933. It and Kringsjå Station were opened on 10 October 1934. At first the line was built with double track to Østhorn and single track to Sognsvann. Between 1937 and 1939, the upper section was converted to double track. Unlike further south along the line there was not as much construction of housing. The area around Kringsjå was mostly developed from the 1960s. Until 1970 there was a café at the station. Kringsjå Student City opened in 1970, followed by Fjellbirkeland Student City in 1990. East of the station there was also a major construction of condominiums and row housing since the 1960s.

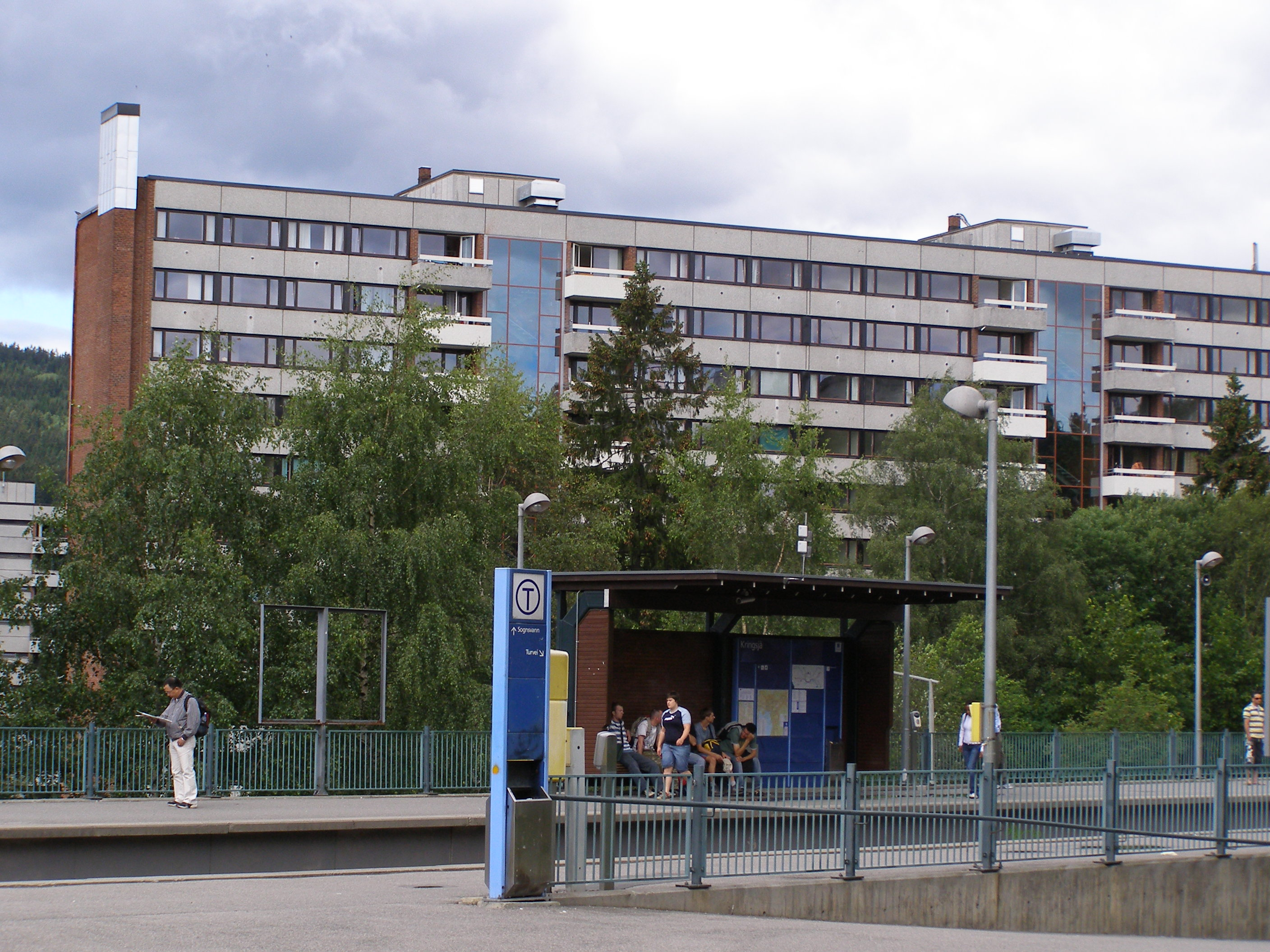
Kringsjå Studenty City in the background

During the 1980s, the city decided to connect the four suburban lines west of the city center with the Oslo Metro. The Sognsvann Line was selected as the first line to be upgraded, so the two systems would become compatible. The line was upgraded to metro standard by replacing the overhead wire with a third-rail power supply and installing automatic train protection. From 4 April 1993 trains along the Sognsvann Line were connected to the eastern part of the metro, initially connected with the Østensjø Line.

== Service ==
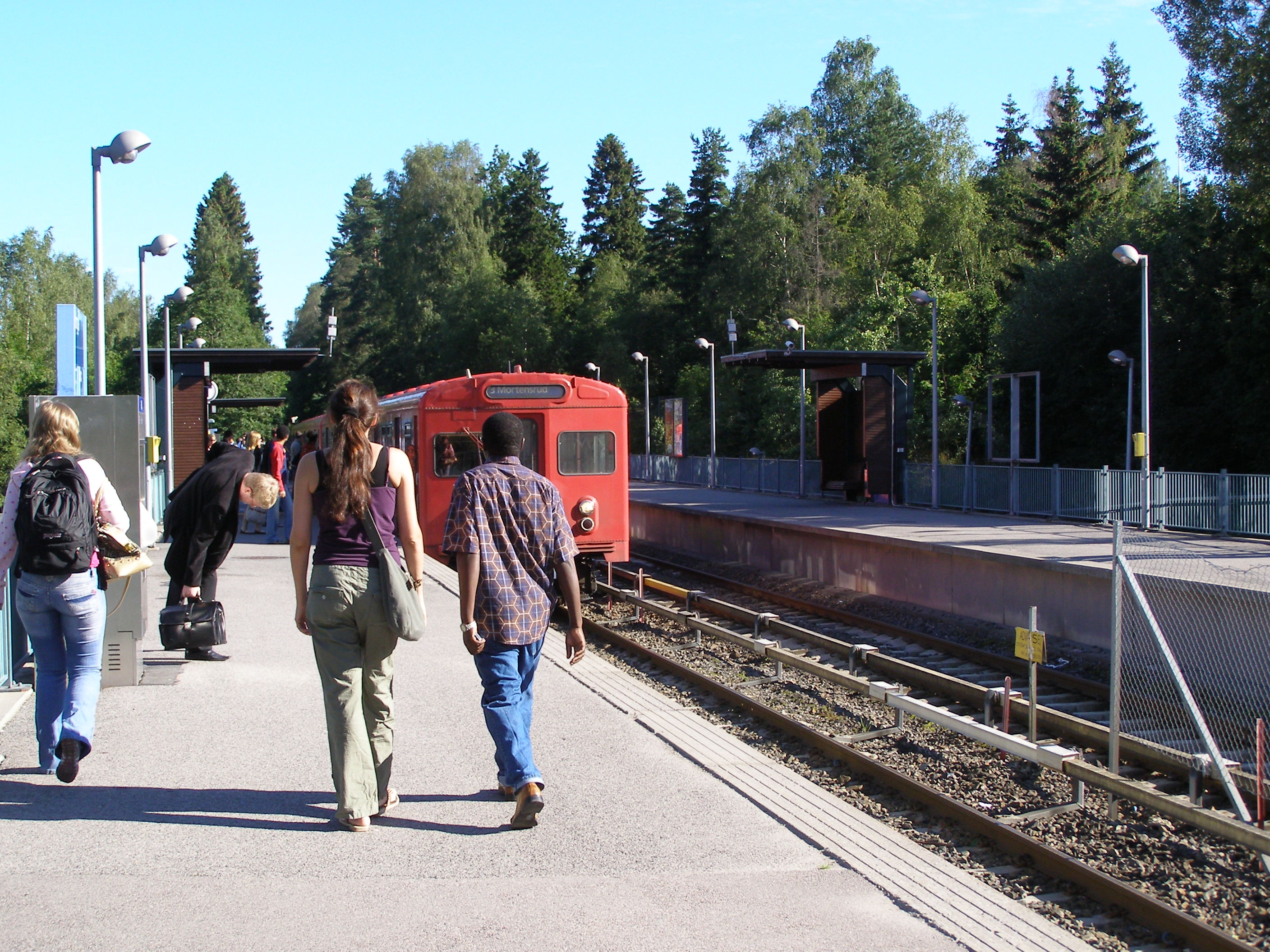
T1000 train pulling into the station in 2007

The station is served by Line 5 of the Oslo Metro. During regular hours, it operates at a 15-minute headway. Travel time to Stortinget is fifteen minutes. Operations are carried out by Sporveien T-banen on contract with Ruter, the public transport authority in Oslo and Akershus. The infrastructure itself is owned by Sporveien, a municipal company. Service is provided using MX3000 three- and six-car trains. The station had an average 2,066 boarding passengers in 2002, ranking second on the line. Only the University of Oslo campus station of Blindern has more. The high ridership derives from the large portion of students in the area, with about 2,400 students living within the station's catchment area. Kringsjå is located in fare zone 1.

== Facilities ==
Kringsjå is a rapid transit station situated on the Sognsvann Line, 8.4 kilometers (5.2 mi) from Stortinget in the city center. It is open ground station featuring two side platforms. The station meets the metro standard of the Oslo Metro. This includes two 120-meter (390 ft) side platforms and an overpass. The station is designed by Arne Henriksen and features a small steel and glued laminated timber roof on each platform. It has a similar design to most of the other stations on the line.
