= Østhorn (station) =

Oslo metro station

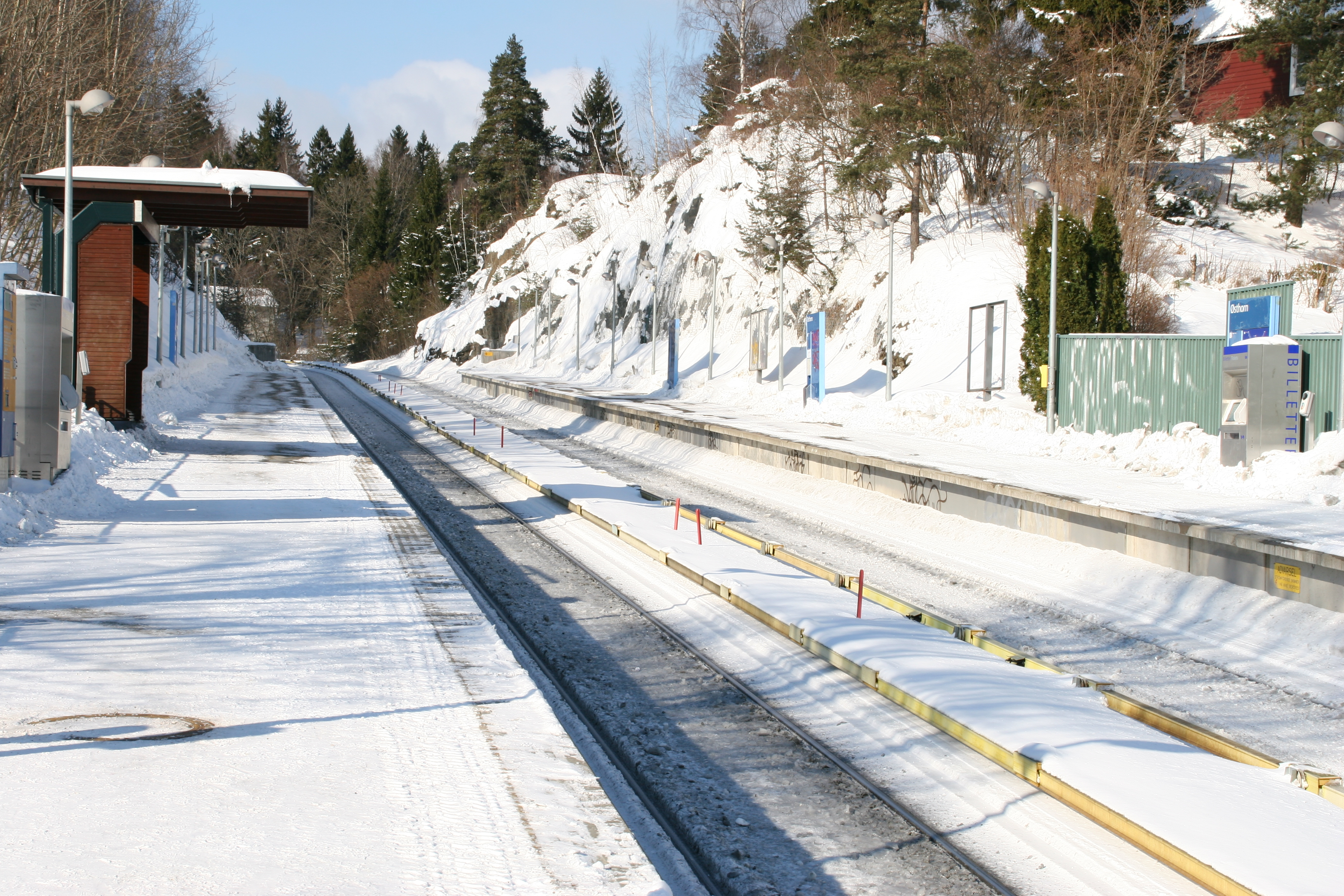

General information
- Location: Nordberg, Oslo; Norway
- Coordinates: 59°57′21″N 10°45′04″E
- Owner: Sporveien
- Operator: Sporveien T-banen
- Line: Sognsvann Line
- Distance: 7.1 kilometres (4.4 mi) from Stortinget

Construction
- Structure type: At-grade
- Accessible: Yes

History
- Opened: 10 October 1934

Services
Preceding station	Oslo Metro	Following station
Holstein towards Sognsvann	Line 5	Tåsen towards Ring Line and Vestli
Location

Østhorn (until 1939 Korsvoll) is a station on the Sognsvann Line (line 5) of the Oslo Metro in Norway. It is located 7.1 kilometres (4.4 mi) from Stortinget station between Tåsen and Holstein stations. As one of the original stations on the line, Østhorn was opened on 10 October 1934. Nordberg was formerly the next northbound station, but it was closed in 1992, when the Sognsvann Line was upgraded to metro standard (power supply via third rail). Østhorn is located near a hill named Havnabakken, where local residents toboggan during winter time.

== History ==
Korsvoll station opened on 10 October 1934, when Akersbanerne had finished the Songsvann Line from Majorstuen to Sognsvann station. The line was double-tracked from Majorstuen to Korsvoll, and single-tracked from there to Sognsvann. In 1939, the section Korsvoll–Sognsvann was upgraded to double tracks, and the station Korsvoll had its name changed to Østhorn. The name "Østhorn" (lit. 'East Horn') owes its origins to a crag by the same name that was demolished during the construction of the Sognsvann Line. The station is now positioned inside the remains of the crag, with a metal nest put up to prevent any crumbling of the surrounding crag.

Østhorn was part of Holmenkolbanen's operating network until 1975, when the municipality of Oslo bought all the company's stock. In 1993, the stations on the Sognsvann Line were upgraded to metro standard, which involved a heightening and lengthening of the platforms, and installation of third rail power supply and a new signaling system. During the upgrade, Tåsen station was moved 150 metres (490 ft) further north, and Nordberg station was closed. Many local residents opposed the new station upgrades, arguing that Nordberg had served the area well with its close connection to the elderly center Nordberghjemmet. Many wanted to rather close Østhorn or Holstein than Nordberg, since the latter was the most used station in the area. Oslo Sporveier stated that the access roads to Nordberg were very steep and dangerous, and referred to an incident in the 1950s where some local youth had been tobogganing over the rail intersection at Nordberg, and hit a truck near the station. They also argued that the 200 metres (660 ft) distance between Nordberg and Holstein was too short for having two separate stations, and promised to build a walkway from Nordberg to Holstein.

== Service ==
Østhorn is served by the line 5 on the Sognsvann Line, operated by Oslo T-banedrift on contract with Ruter. The rapid transit serves the station every 15 minutes, except in the late evening and on weekend mornings, when there is a 30-minute headway. Travel time along the 7.1-kilometre (4.4 mi) portion to Stortinget in the city center is 13 minutes.

The station provides correspondence to the bus lines 22 and 25 on the top of Havnabakken, a five-minute walk away.

== Facilities ==
Østhorn has two platforms, with a wooden shed on the southbound platform. The sheds are designed by Arne Henriksen in a minimalist and standardised style with constructions of wood and steel. Østhorn serves the residential areas Korsvoll and Nordberg. The station is located at the bottom of a small hill named Havnabakken, where local residents toboggan at winter's time.
