= Nordberg (station) =

Former Oslo metro station

Coordinates: 59.95919°N 10.74395°E

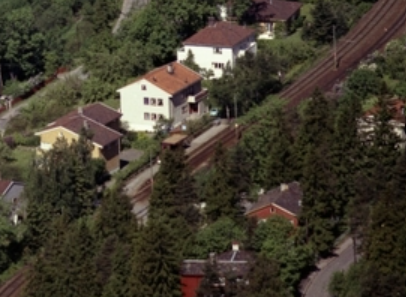
- Aerial photo from 1962 of Nordberg station and surroundings

General information
- Location: Nordberg, Oslo; Norway
- Elevation: 166.9 m (548 ft)
- Line: Sognsvann Line

Construction
- Structure type: At-grade

History
- Opened: 10 October 1934
- Closed: 5 May 1992
Location

Nordberg was a station on the Sognsvann Line of the Oslo Metro in Oslo, Norway. It was opened on 10 October 1934, and was located between Østhorn and Holstein stations, in a level crossing with the steep road Borgestadveien. The station saw several accidents, and was closed on 5 May 1992 when the Sognsvann Line was upgraded to rapid transit standard. An underpass was constructed to allow pedestrians pass under the tracks.

== History ==
Nordberg station opened on 10 October 1934 as a station on the Sognsvann Line. The line was built by the municipally owned company Akersbanerne. The line was double-tracked from Majorstuen to Korsvoll, and single-tracked from there to Sognsvann. In 1939, the section Korsvoll–Sognsvann was upgraded to double track, and the station Korsvoll had its name changed to Østhorn.

Nordberg was part of Holmenkolbanen's operating network until 1975, when the municipality of Oslo bought all the company's stock. In the early 1990s, the stations on the Sognsvann Line were upgraded to metro standard, which involves a heightening and lengthening of the platforms, installation of third rail power supply and a new signaling system. The third rail made it impossible to cross the line in-grade, and under- or overpasses had to be built at all stations. The transport authorities decided to close Nordberg, arguing that the access roads to the station were steep and dangerous, and icy during the winter. The residents of Nordberg opposed the closure of the station, arguing that it had served the area well with its central position in the area. Nevertheless, the station was closed, along with the level crossing that formerly had allowed for car traffic to cross the tracks. An underpass for pedestrians was constructed.

== Accidents ==
In 1951, two young lads rode a sled over the station's level crossing, and accidentally hit a truck that was parked on the other side of the station. In 1987, a 29-year-old man was attacked by a raging moose near the station. The man ran off to a shop 40 metres (130 ft) away, and left the accident with broken ribs and a punctured lung. The reason for the moose's rage is unknown, but it was seen a few days earlier with a calf, and it is assumed that the moose wanted to protect it from foreigners. The man was sent to Ullevål University Hospital shortly thereafter.

== Location ==
Nordberg Station was located in the steep road named Borgestadveien, that passed the station in a level crossing. The station served the local senior center named Nordberghjemmet, and was the most used of all stations among residents living in Nordberg. After the 1992 closure, very little remains from the station, aside from a pedestrians' underpass.
