= Kontraskjæret tram stop =

Tram station in Oslo, Norway

Kontraskjæret

General information
- Location: Vika, Oslo
- Coordinates: 59°54′39″N 10°44′09″E
- Owner: Sporveien
- Operator: Sporveien Trikken
- Line: Vika Line

Services
Preceding station	Trams in Oslo	Following station
Aker Brygge towards Majorstuen	Line 12	Øvre Slottsgate towards Kjelsås
Location

Kontraskjæret is a tram stop on the Vika Line. The station opened in 1995 as the name Rådhusplassen; From 2015, the station has closed due to maintenance works on the Vika Line and opened again with the name Kontraskjæret. The station is close to Rådhusbrygge 1 (Aker Brygge platf. F).

== Services ==
The station is served by Line 12, in the Vika Line of the Oslo Tramway.
