= Space Group Company =

Norwegian architecture office

- Industry: Architecture
- Founded: 1999
- Headquarters: Oslo, Norway
- Key people: Gary Bates, Gro Bonesmo, Floire Nathanael Daub
- Website: https://www.spacegroup.no

Space Group is an architecture office established in 1999 in Oslo, Norway and created by Gary Bates and Gro Bonesmo. Prior to founding Space Group, they worked with OMA/Rem Koolhaas, which they later on collaborated for the Vestbanen project in Oslo.

The firm is also known for leading large master plan development and research. One of their current involvements is for the project "8 million city"/Station City, connecting Oslo to Copenhagen by train. They were the curators of the Nordic Pavilion at the 14th International Architecture Exhibition at the Venice Biennale in 2014.

== Notable work ==
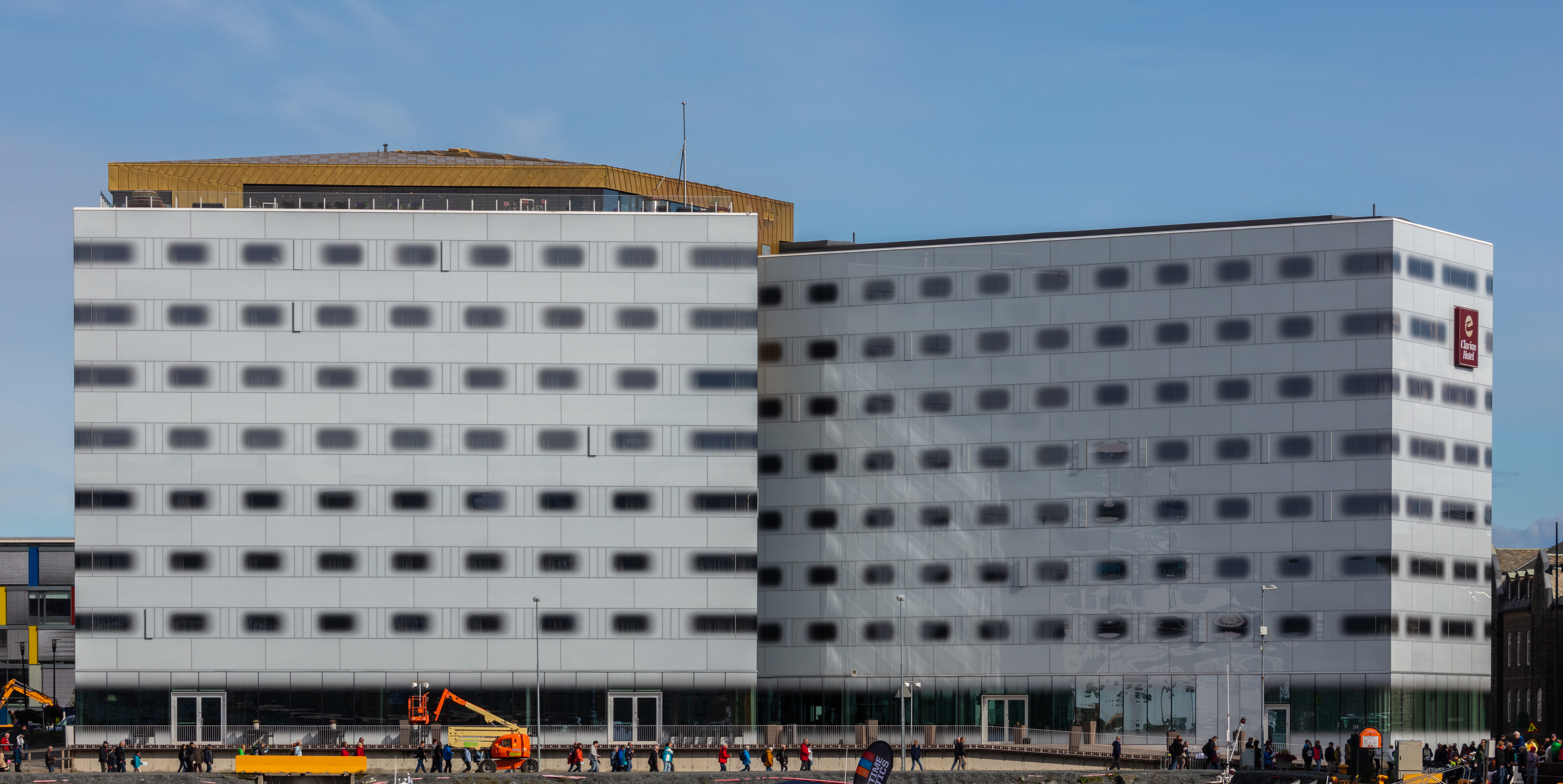
Clarion Hotel & Congress in Trondheim.

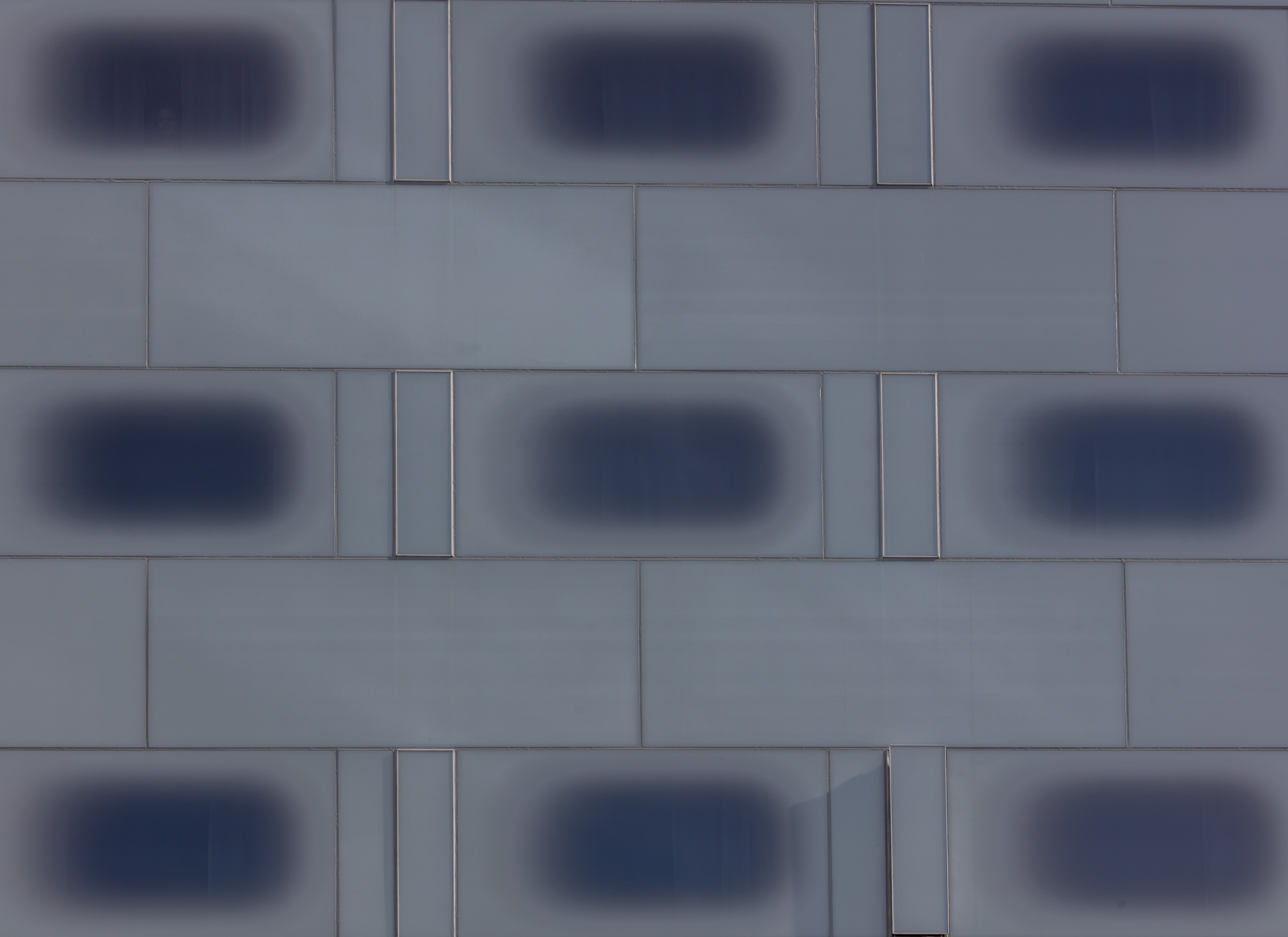
Detail of the windows.

- Verkstedhallen, Aker Brygge, Oslo (completed 2014)
- Aker Brygge Masterplan, Oslo (completed 2014)
- Nedregate Cultural District, Oslo (completed 2013)
- Trondheim Clarion Hotel & Congress, Trondheim (completed 2012)
- Luftfartstilsynet - Norwegian Civil Aviation HQ, Bodø (completed 2011)
- Blue Moon House SRH, Groningen (completed 2001)
- Varner House, Asker (completed 2003)

== Main competitions ==
- 2012 Nye Ruten with Superunion (Sandnes, Norway)
- 2010 Opera And Culture House with Brisac Gonzalez (Kristiansand, Norway)
- 2008 Oslo Central Station (Oslo, Norway)
- 2008 Luftfartstilsynet - Norwegian Civil Aviation HQ (Bodø, Norway)
- 2002 Oslo West Station Library & Museum with OMA and REX Architecture (Oslo, Norway)

== Selected awards ==
- 2013 Metall 13, Clarion Hotel and Congress Trondheim, Norway
- 2013 Oslo bys arkitekturpris Nedregate Culture District / Nedregate 5-7, Oslo, Norway
- 2012 DNB Eiendomspris Clarion Hotel and Congress Trondheim, Norway
- 2012 Houens Fund Diploma Varner House, Asker, Norway
- 2005 European Steel Award Varner House, Asker, Norway
- 2005 International Architectural Biennal Rotterdam, curator Adriaan Geuze – ‘THE FLOOD’ Catamaran City

== Publication ==
- SPACEGROUP, Norway: Untitled 2000-2008 DD30 Damdi Publishing Company Publishers. 2008. ISBN 978-8-99111-137-0

== Exhibitions ==
- 2015 Snapshot Galleri Rom, Oslo
- 2015 Forms of Freedom. African Independence and Nordic Models, Nasjonalmuseet – Arkitektur, Fehn-paviljongen
- 2014 Forms of Freedom curator of Nordic Pavilion, Venice Biennale
- 2011 From Skin to Flesh Galeria Eduardo Fernandes, São Paulo, curated by Ricardo de Ostos
- 2012 Light Houses: On the Nordic Common Ground. Nordic Pavilion, Venice Biennale
- 2004 SPACE GROUP: Exposed Experiment Change, Galleri Rom, Oslo
