= Dronningens gate tram stop =

Tram station in the Oslo Tramway

Dronningens gate

General information
- Location: Sentrum, Oslo; Norway
- Coordinates: 59°54′38″N 10°44′48″E
- System: Tram station
- Lines: Vika Line, Briskeby Line

History
- Opened: 27 February 2017

Services
Preceding station	Trams in Oslo	Following station
Øvre Slottsgate towards Majorstuen	Line 11	Jernbanetorget towards Kjelsås
Øvre Slottsgate towards Majorstuen	Line 12	Jernbanetorget towards Kjelsås
Øvre Slottsgate towards Bekkestua	Line 13	Bjørvika towards Ljabru
Location

Dronningens gate is a tram stop of the Oslo Tramway. It is served by lines 11, 12 and 13. It is served with both SL79 and SL95 trams. Since autumn 2020, Line 13 does not operate at Jernbanetorget station. Dronningens gate is recommended instead, if you need to travel using line 13 to Lilleaker or Skøyen, and is also displayed on maps of the Jernbanetorget area, as Platform S & T. Westbound, the next station is Øvre Slottsgate, however Line 13, which operates on the Bjørvika Line separates from Line 11 and 12, which head northwards up to Jernbanetorget station (in front of the Oslo S).
