= Øvre Slottsgate tram stop =

Tram station in Oslo, Norway

Coordinates: 59°54′42″N 10°44′31″E

Øvre Slottsgate

General information
- Location: Sentrum, Oslo; Norway
- System: Tram or Light Rail Station
- Line: Vika
- Connections: Metro: Stortinget station

History
- Opened: February 2017

Services
Preceding station	Trams in Oslo	Following station
Nationaltheatret towards Majorstuen	Line 11	Dronningens gate towards Kjelsås
Kontraskjæret towards Majorstuen	Line 12	Dronningens gate towards Kjelsås
Nationaltheatret towards Bekkestua	Line 13	Dronningens gate towards Ljabru
Location

Øvre Slottsgate is a tram rail station on both the Vika Line and the Briskeby Line. The station is served by lines 11, 12 and 13. Therefore, it is operated with SL79 high-floor trams and SL95 low-floor trams. The station replaced the former Kongens gate and the Wessels plass tram stops.

== Transfers ==
Øvre Slottsgate is a short minute walk from the bus stations at Kvadraturen, Wessels Plass and the now defunct bus and tram stop, Christiania Torv. Nationaltheatret (11,13) and Kontraskjæret (12) are stations succeeding Øvre Slottsgate westbound, while Dronningens gate succeeds Øvre Slottsgate eastbound. The station is also close to the Stortinget station, so it is easy to transfer between the tramway and the metro.
