= Aker Brygge tram stop =

Tram stop in Oslo, Norway

Aker Brygge
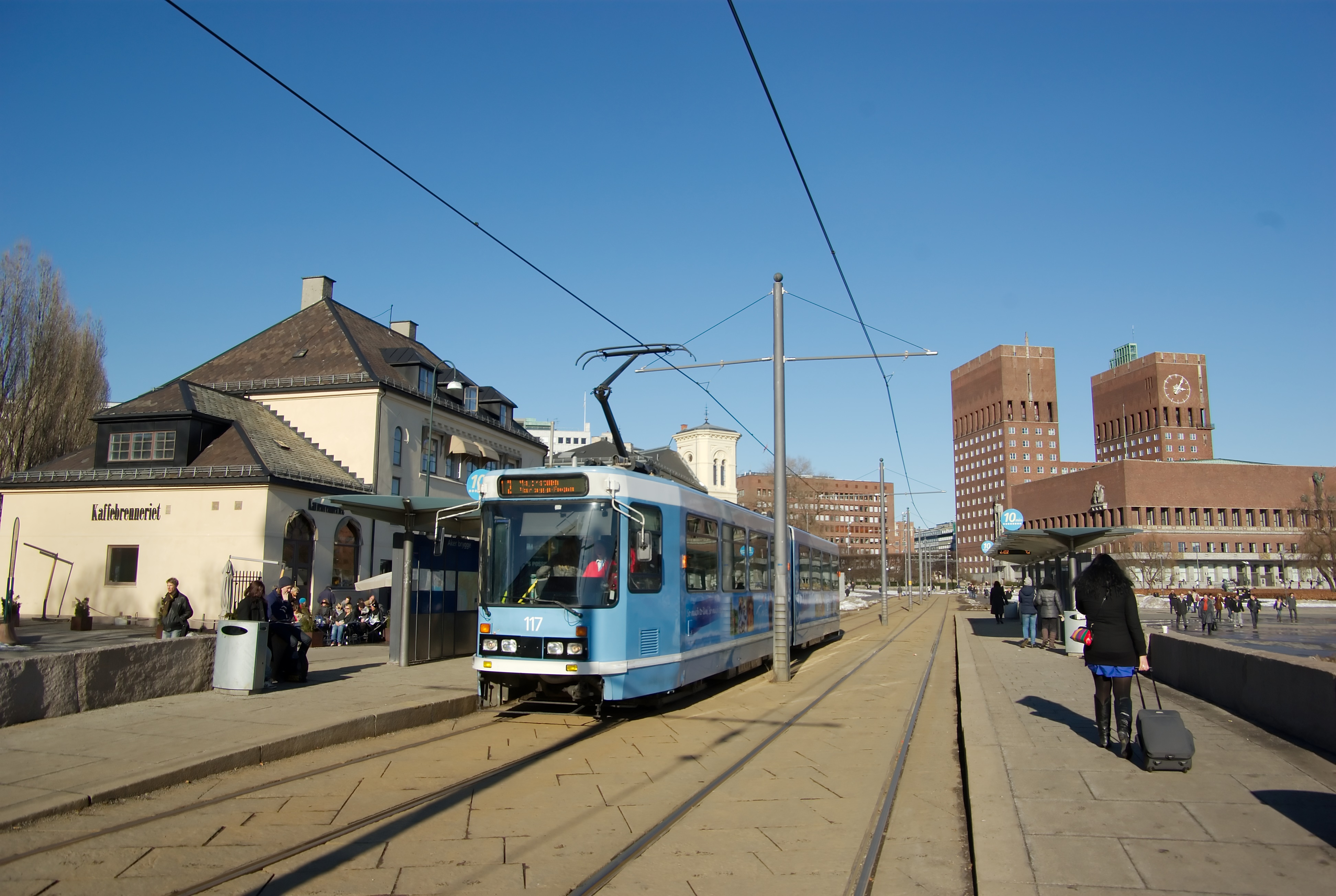

General information
- Location: Aker Brygge, Oslo; Norway
- Coordinates: 59°54′40″N 10°43′48″E
- Line: Vika Line

History
- Opened: 21 August 1995

Services
Preceding station	Trams in Oslo	Following station
Ruseløkka towards Majorstuen	Line 12	Kontraskjæret towards Kjelsås
Location

Aker Brygge is a tram stop on the Oslo Tramway.

Located at Aker Brygge, it was opened by Oslo Sporveier in 1994 as a part of the Vika Line. It is served by line 12, which operates between Majorstua and Kjelsås. Aker Brygge is also located nearby the former Oslo West Station, which is where the name Vestbanelinjen came from. The Vestbanen line was closed down in the 1960s, but reopened afterwards as the Vika Line.

== Ferry Services ==
The station is also a pier for these ferry Lines:

B1 Øyene
B2 Nakkeholmen (Summer service)
B3 Bleikøya (Summer service)
B4 Gressholmen - Langøyene (Summer service)
B10 Nessoddtangen
B20 Slemmestad (Does not operate at the summer)
B21 Son (Summer service)
B22 Drøbak (Summer service)
