= Bjørvika tram stop =

Oslo tram station

Bjørvika
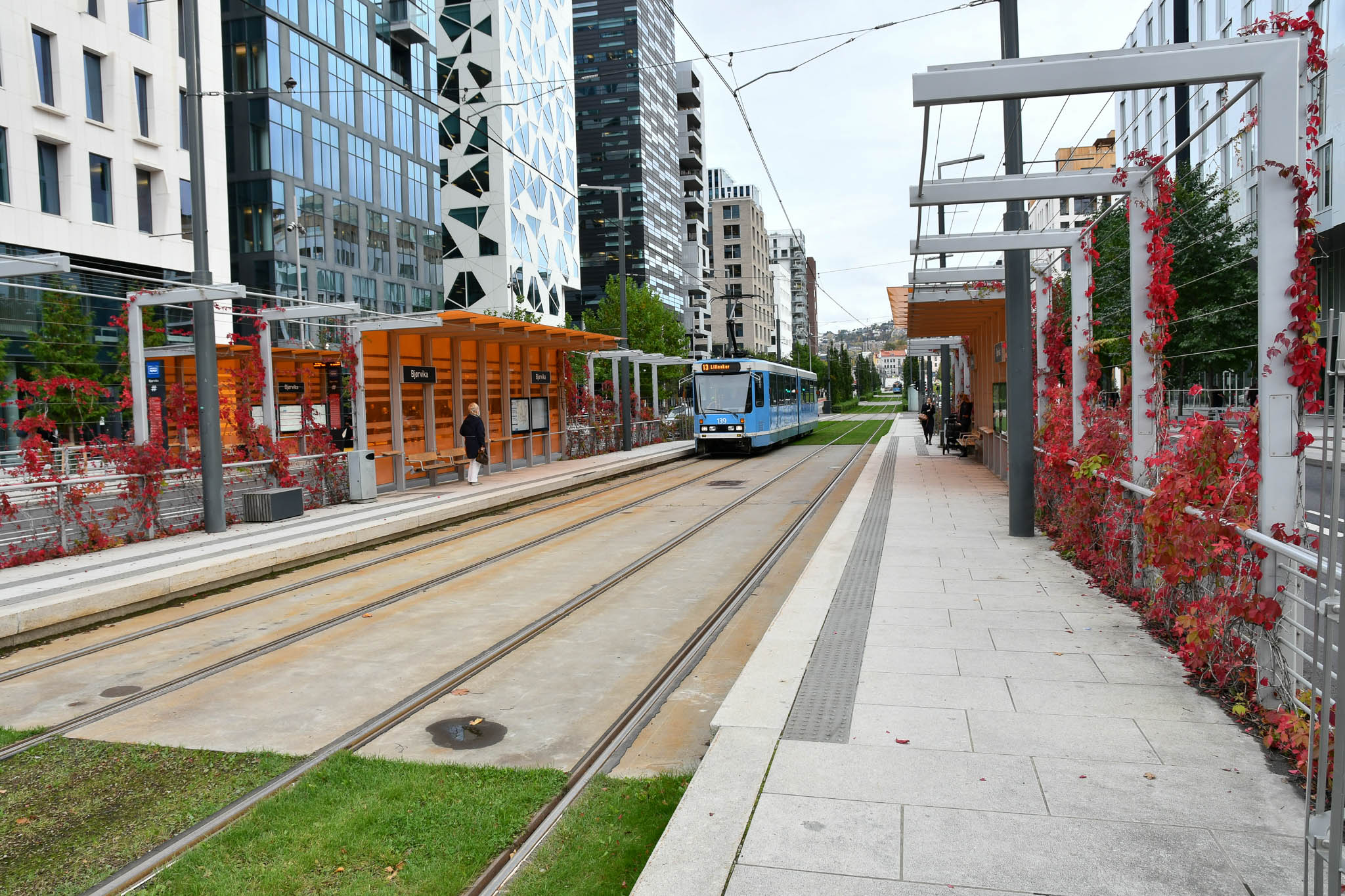
- SL-79 (Line 13) at Bjørvika tram stop

General information
- Location: Sentrum, Oslo; Norway
- Coordinates: 59.90806°N 10.75639°E
- Owner: Sporveien
- Operator: Sporveien Trikken
- Line: Bjørvika Line

Other information
- Fare zone: Zone 1

History
- Opened: October 4, 2020

Services
Preceding station	Trams in Oslo	Following station
Dronningens gate towards Bekkestua	Line 13	Middelalderparken towards Ljabru
Jernbanetorget towards Majorstuen	Line 19	Middelalderparken towards Ljabru
Location

Bjørvika is a tram stop in the Oslo Tramway. It is one of the stops on the Bjørvika Line and is served by lines 13 and 19. It is located in Sentrum, Oslo. Bjørvika is near the bus station called Bjørvika, and is served by multiple local and regional bus routes. Bjørvika is near Deichmann's public library, the Opera House and the Barcode promenade.

== History ==
It was a terminus in 2017 and 2018 for lines 17 and 18, due to building repairs. It also served as a terminus for line 13 (from May 18, 2020 to September 11, 2020), due to repairs on the Grünerløkka-Torshov Line. It was opened for daily use on October 4, 2020.
