= Nordberg =

Neighbourhood in Nordre Aker, Oslo, Norway

Coordinates: 59°57′24″N 10°44′36″E

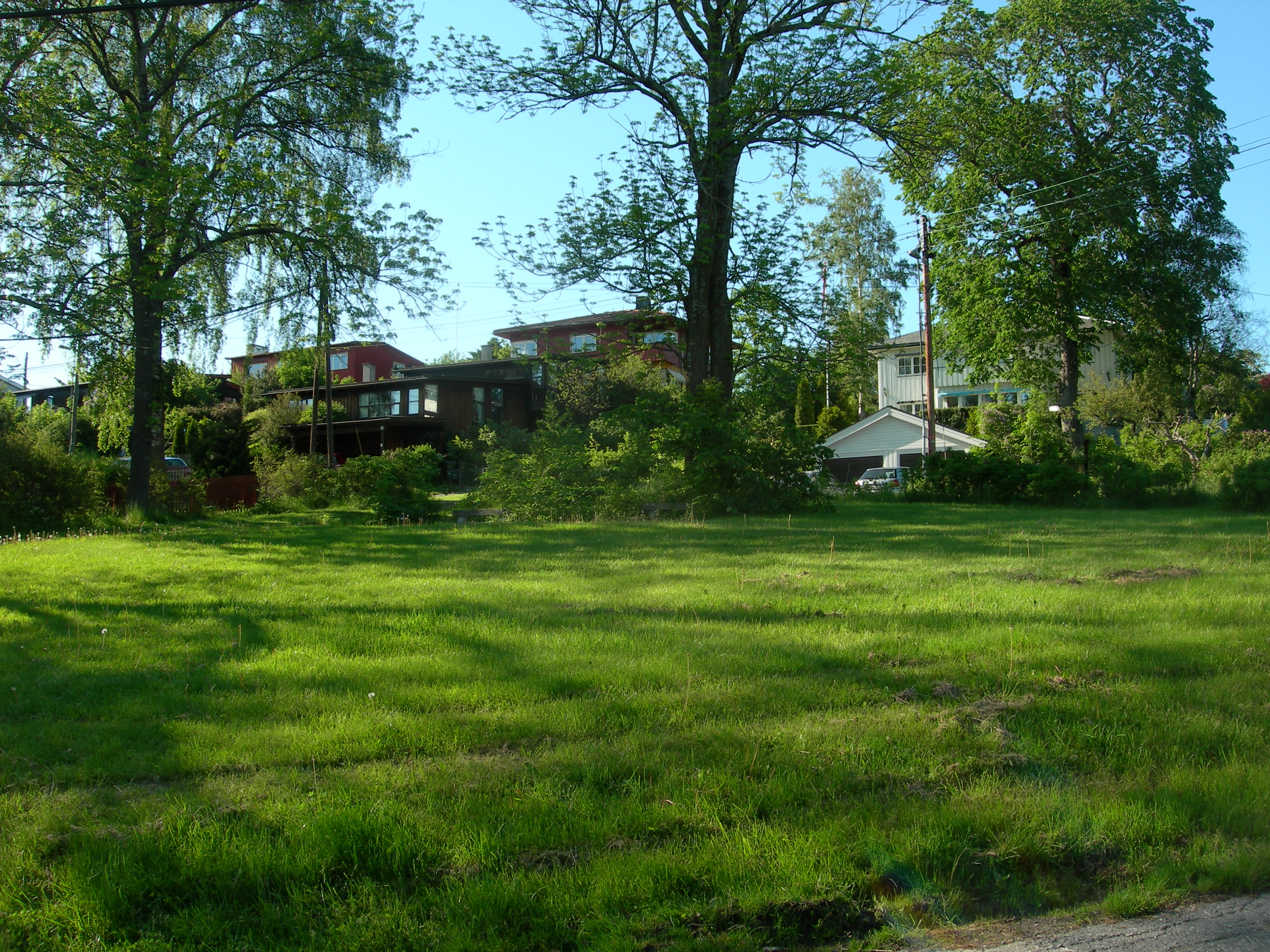
Krokusveien in Nordre Aker in June 2007.

Nordberg is a neighbourhood in Nordre Aker in Oslo, the capital of Norway.

From 1934 to 1992 it was served by Nordberg Station on the Sognsvann Line, but is now served by Østhorn and Holstein on the same line.
