= Middelalderparken tram stop =

Oslo tram stop

Coordinates: 59.9064°N 10.7639°E

Middelalderparken

General information
- Location: Gamleby, Oslo; Norway
- Owner: Sporveien
- Operator: Sporveien Trikken
- Line: Ekeberg Line

Other information
- Fare zone: Zone 1

History
- Opened: 4 October 2020

Services
Preceding station	Trams in Oslo	Following station
Bjørvika towards Bekkestua	Line 13	Oslo Hospital towards Ljabru
Bjørvika towards Majorstuen	Line 19	Oslo Hospital towards Ljabru
Location

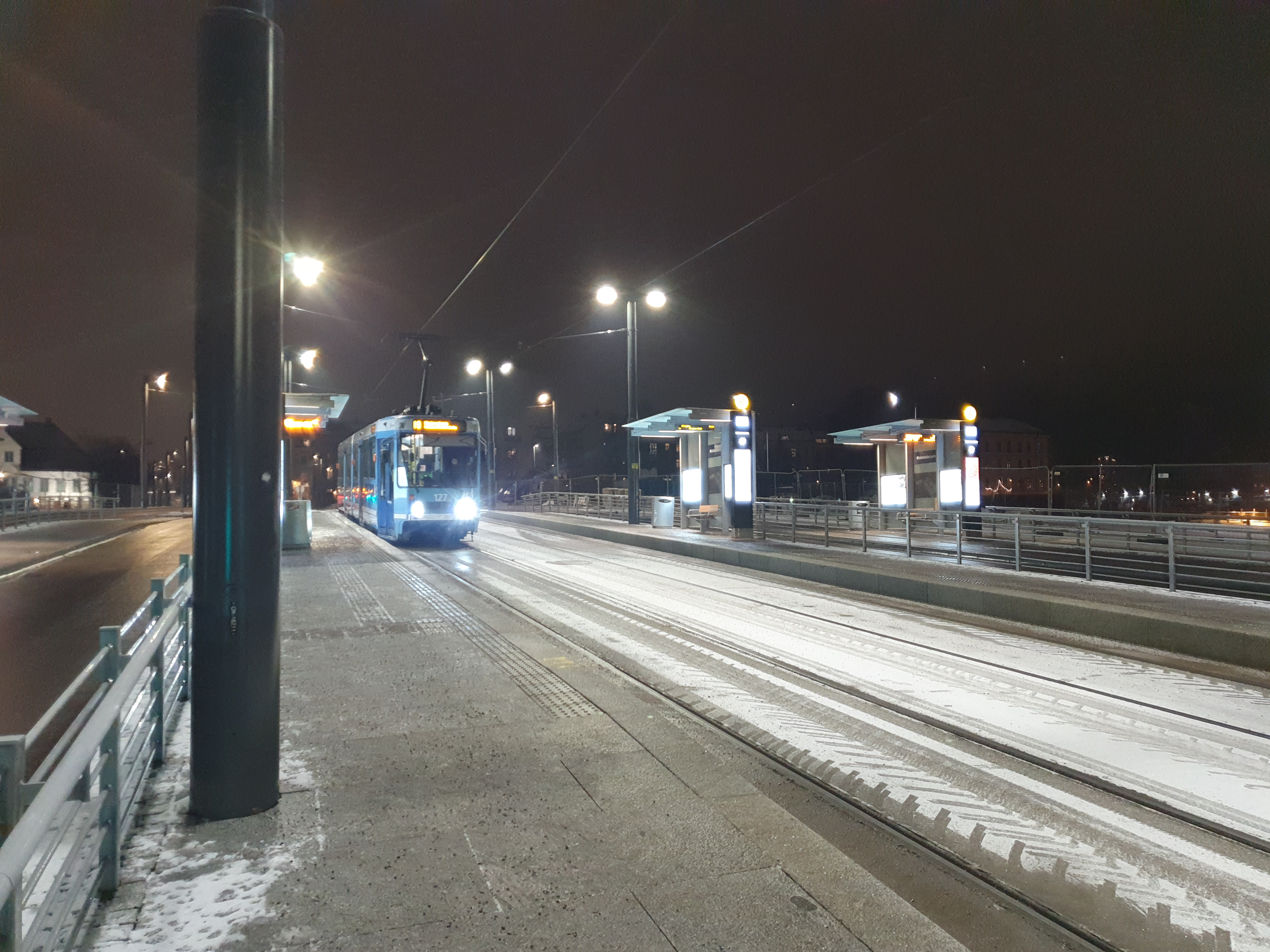
An SL79 tram at Middelalderparken tram stop.

Middelalderparken is a tram stop on the Ekeberg Line of the Oslo Tramway. It is served by lines 13 and 19. It was opened on 4 October 2020. It is between Bjørvika and Oslo Hospital. It is located at the intersection at Bispegata and Trelastgata. It is located near the former tram stop called 'St Halvards plass'.
