= Aker Brygge =

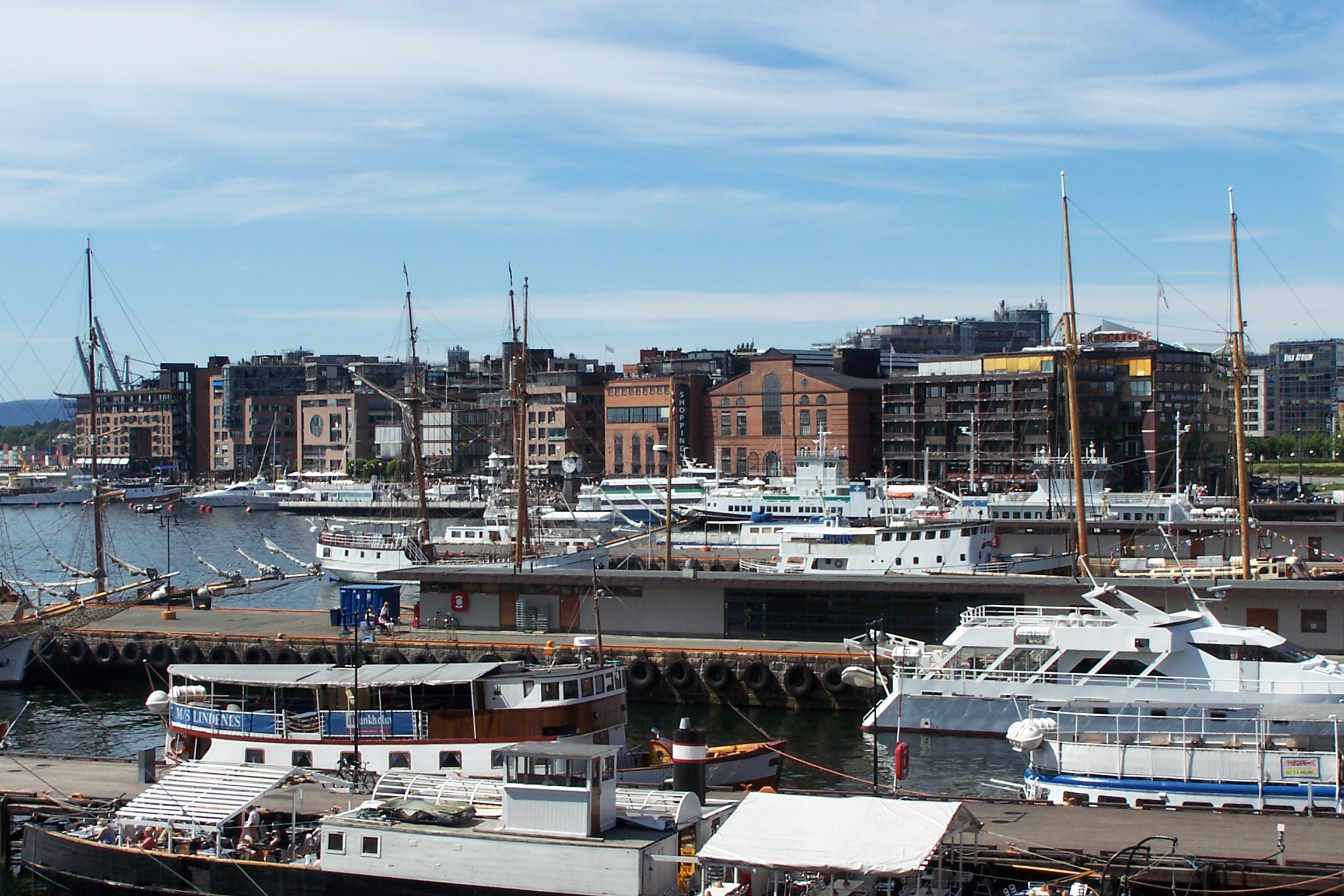
- View of Aker Brygge from Akershus Fortress
- Interactive map of Aker Brygge
- Coordinates: 59°54′35″N 10°43′36″E
- Country: Norway
- County: Oslo
- Municipality: Oslo
- Borough: Sentrum

Area
  - Land: 0.26 km^{2} (0.10 sq mi)
- Time zone: UTC+1 (CET)
  - Summer (DST): UTC+2 (CEST)
- Postal codes: 0250

Aker Brygge, formerly known as Holmen, is a neighbourhood in central Oslo, Norway. Since the 1980s and 1990s, it has been a popular area for shopping, dining, and entertainment, as well as a high-end residential area. It was previously an industrial area.

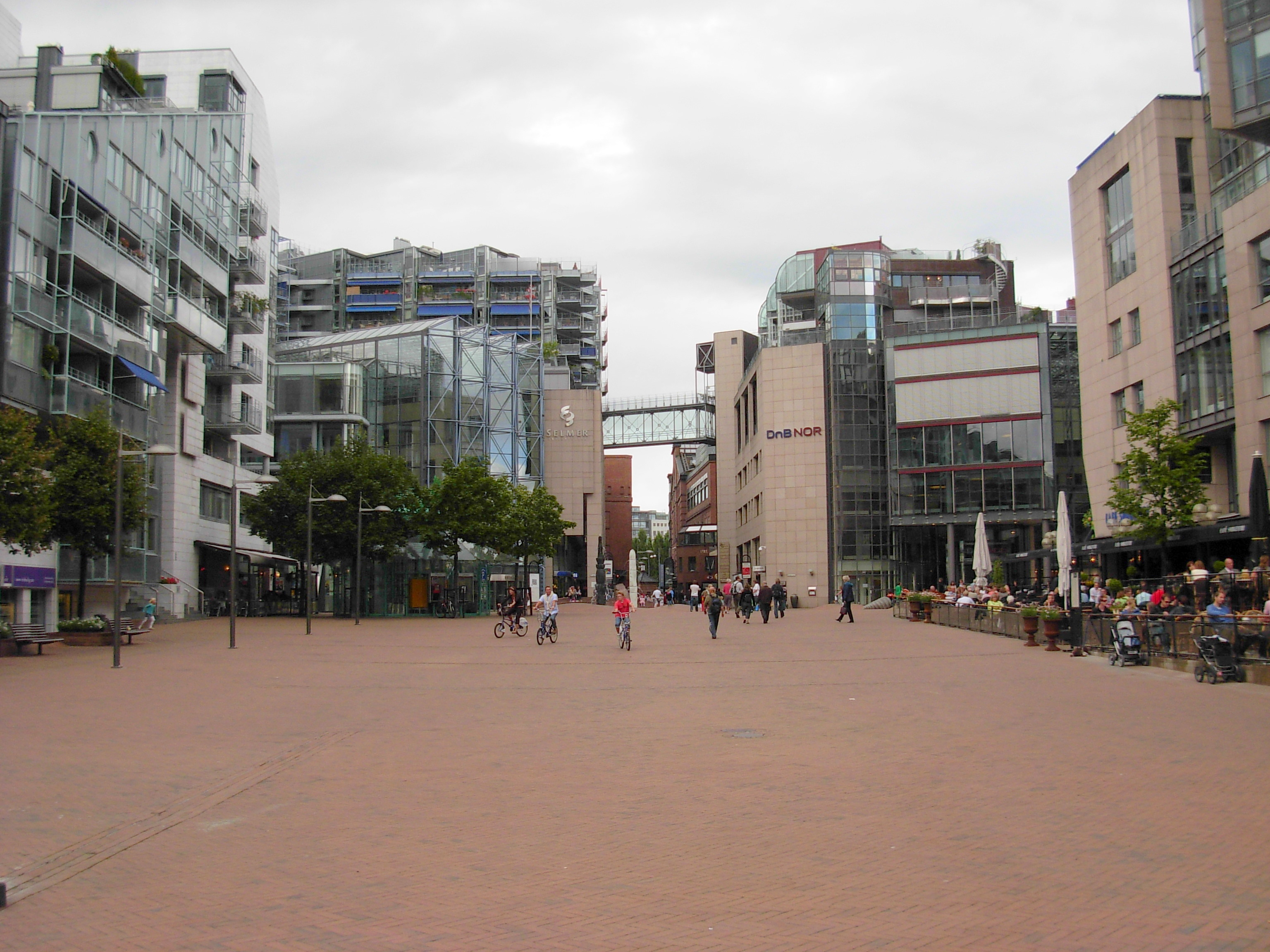
Bryggetorget at Aker Brygge

== History ==
Prior to the establishment of the Akers Mekaniske Verksted shipyards in 1854, the area was known as Holmen. It was then an old yard where some minor industrial activity and a suburban establishment grew in the early 19th century. Akers Mekaniske Verksted ceased operations in 1982.

The construction of Aker Brygge was carried out in four steps by the r property developers Aker Eiendom AS. A few old industrial buildings were demolished, while several of the major workshop halls were rebuilt as shopping areas. The first step of the construction was finished in 1986, with Telje, Torp, and Aasen as architects. The fourth and final construction, the Storebrand insurance building facing Munkedamsveien, was completed in 1998.

A master plan led by Space Group Company and Ghilardi + Hellsten reorganised the area between 2010 and 2014. Space Group worked on activating the parallel streets, and created an inside street, going through the main buildings. Aker Brygge is a leader in Norway for waterfront development and it is one of the most visited places in Oslo with 12 million visitors each year.

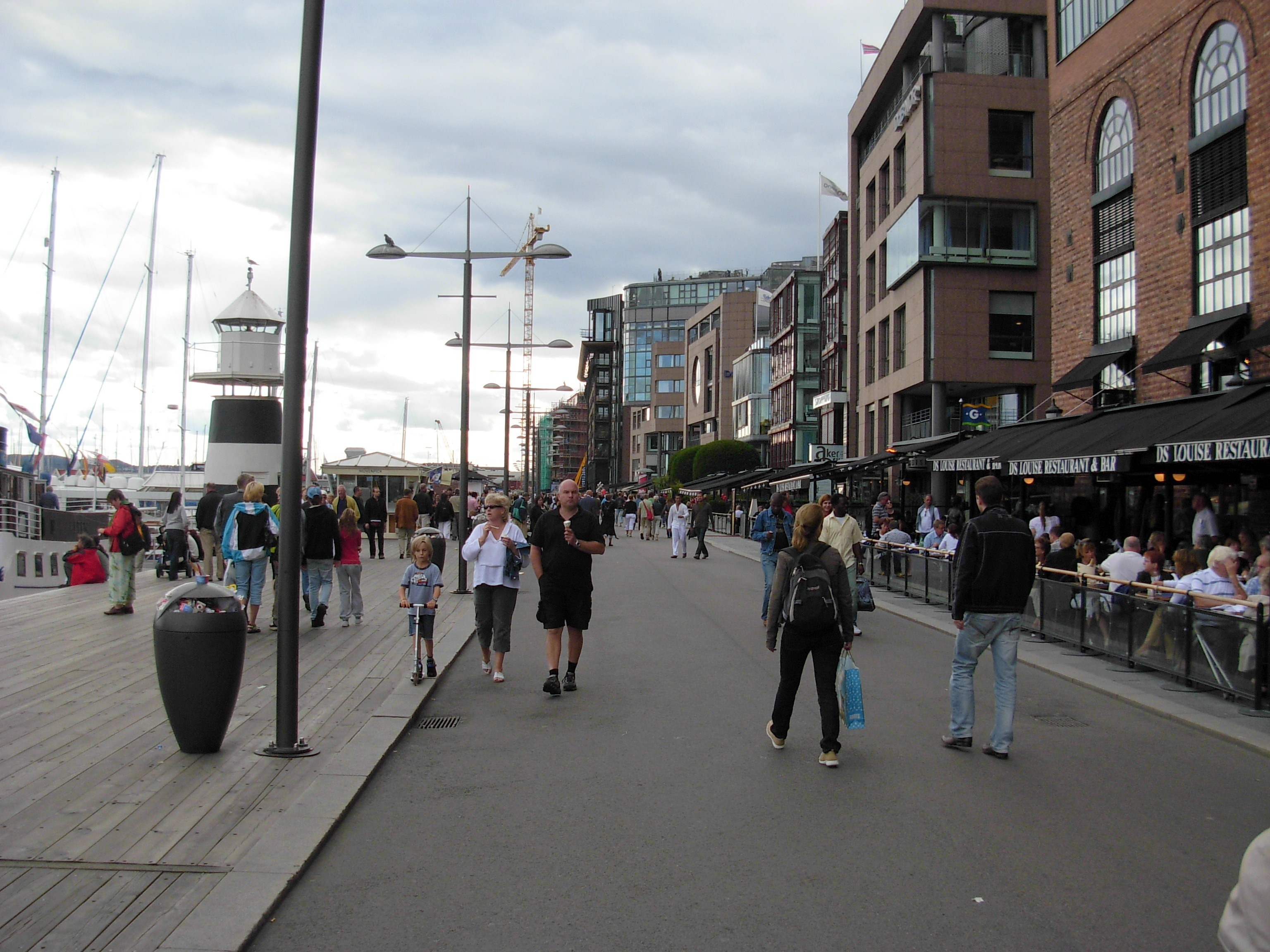
Tingvallakaia, gaten Stranden, September 2009

== Location and description ==
Aker Brygge is located just west of downtown on the westside of Pipervika, an arm of the Oslofjord, on the former shipyard of Akers Mekaniske Verksted, which ceased operations in 1982.

The area consists of a shopping centre with shops and restaurants, a cinema, office space, and apartments. Additionally, there is a small boat harbour, and a terminal for the ferries to Nesodden. The area measures 260,000 m^{2} (2,800,000 sq ft).

Aker Brygge is served by the Aker Brygge tram station.

Today, about 6,000 people work in Aker Brygge and approximately 900 people have their homes here. The area consists of 13 separate units and 9 of them are divided into a total of 823 owner units. The properties are bound together through a comprehensive working agreement thereby creating a new district of Oslo which is unique from both a national and international perspective. A number of public areas and arrangements have been developed through cooperation between apartment owners, and business and cultural interests. The administration of the working agreement and the carrying out of such tasks is done by the commonly owned company Bryggedrift AS.

The Astrup Fearnley Museum of Modern Art, designed by Renzo Piano, is near Aker Brygge.

== Monuments ==
In 2010 a monument of Max Manus was moved away from Aker Brygge, after members of the Pelle group had pointed out that their group was responsible for the major 1944 ship sabotage at present-day Aker Brygge.

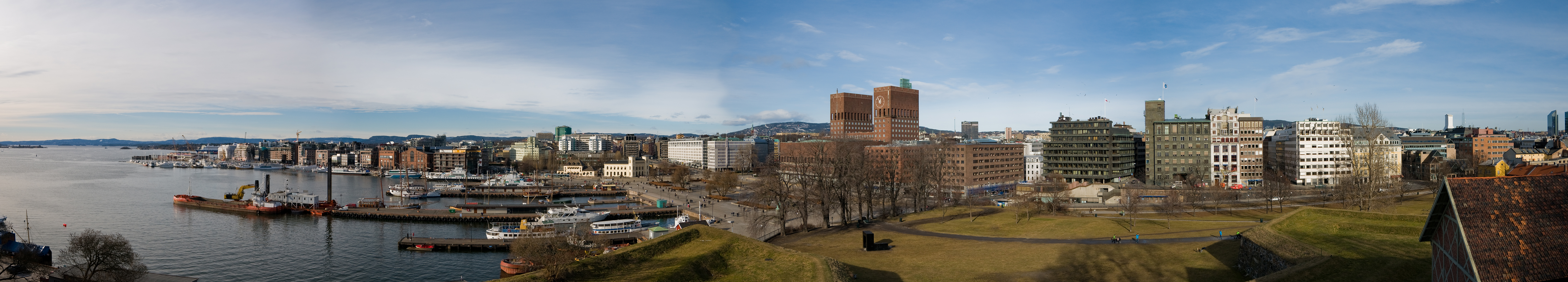
Aker brygge and surroundings, February 2008. Aker Brygge is seen to the left, on the furthermost pier in its full length. Oslo City Hall with its characteristic twin towers in the right part of the picture.
