= Gamlebyen Line =

Tram line in Oslo, Norway

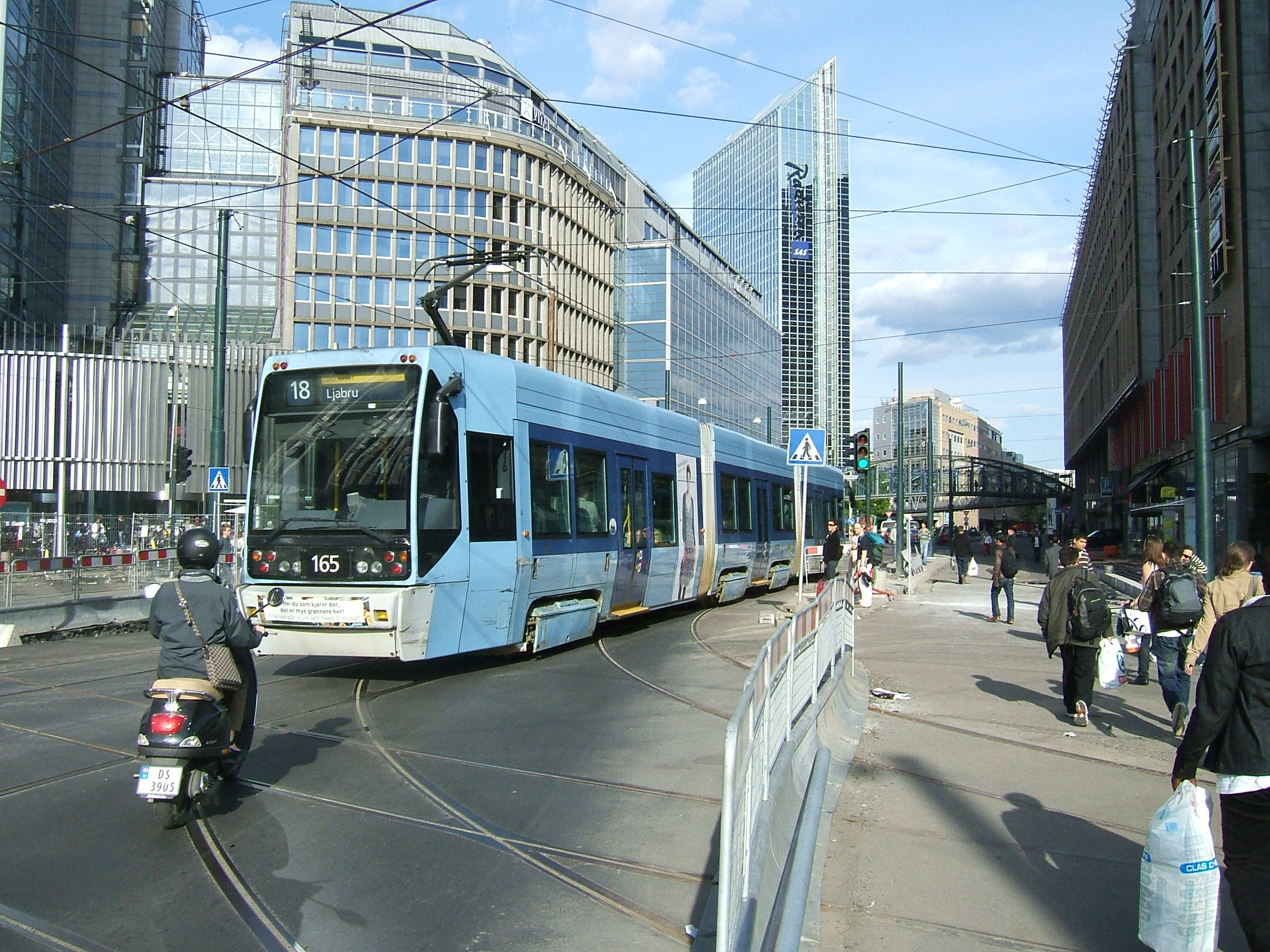
- Schweigaards gate

Overview
- Native name: Gamlebylinjen
- Status: Closed, replaced by Bjørvika Line
- Owner: Kollektivtransportproduksjon
- Locale: Oslo, Norway
- Termini: Jernbanetorget; Oslo Hospital

Service
- Type: Tramway
- System: Oslo Tramway
- Operator: Oslo Sporvognsdrift
- Rolling stock: SL79 and SL95

History
- Opened: 1875
- Closed: 2020

Technical
- Number of tracks: Double
- Track gauge: 1,435 mm (4 ft 8 1/2 in)
- Electrification: 750 V DC
- Operating speed: 50 kilometres per hour (31 mph)
Route map
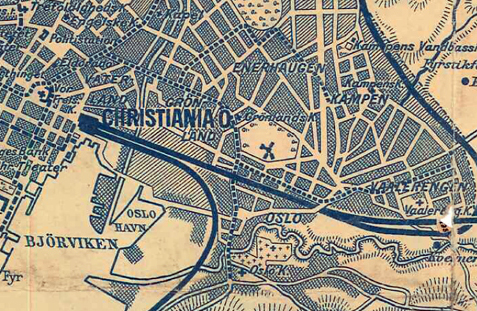

The Gamlebyen Line (Norwegian: Gamlebylinjen) was a section of the Oslo Tramway which ran east from Jernbanetorget along Schweigaards gate (street), past the Bjørvika then turns south along Oslo gate, and past Gamlebyen before becoming the Ekeberg Line. The section was served by lines 18 and 19 before it was replaced by Bjørvika Line since October 2020.

== History ==
The line was opened by Kristiania Sporveisselskab in 1875 as a horsecar route between Stortorvet and Gamlebyen. In 1900 the line was electrified, and received branch lines to Kampen and Vålerenga. The Vålerenga Line was extended to Etterstad in 1923, where there was a transfer to the Østensjø Line. Until 1925, the line was named the Oslo Line; with the name change of the city from Kristiania to Oslo, the district known as Oslo was renamed Gamlebyen.

The plans from 1919 called for a common connection from the Østensjø Line and the Ekeberg Line to the city center, along with the proposed Lambertseter Line. The Ekberg Line was to run through a tunnel from Sjømannskolen to Lodalen, from there over a bridge and then connect with the Østensjø Line at Harald Hårdrådes plass. They would then run along an elevated line along Schweigaards gate to Vaterland, and from there in a tunnel to a terminus at Stortorvet.

In 1937, Ekebergbanen proposed a line south of Oslo gate on a bridge over Kongsveien, Oslo gate and the railway tracks, and then along Kanslergata to the proposed elevated line in Hollendergata. A formal concession was sent in 1937, but the plans were stopped by the war. After the war, it was decided that the Lambertseter Line would run from Bryn on the Østensjø Line, which would allow the Lambertseter Line, which had been proposed to connect to the Ekeberg Line, to become part of the metro. This terminated plans for rebuild the downtown section of the Ekeberg Line.

In 1957, a new route from Oslo gate via Schweigaards gate to Jernbanetorget was built to reduce travel time along the new Lambertseter Line. In 1966, the Østensjø and Lambertseter Lines were transferred to the Oslo Metro.

In the 1970s, the traffic from Mosseveien was rerouted over Loenga Bridge into Bispegata. Oslo gate was then closed for through traffic, which improved traffic. The section from Jernbanetorget to Hollendergata was rebuilt between 1988 and 1991, resulting in an all-new light rail section in its own right-of-way. The rest of the line was renovated from 1990 to 1992.

There are plans to move the line from Schewigaards gate and let the line run through Dronning Eufemias gate as part of the development in Bjørvika. The move was expected to be done in 2014, but finished in October 2020.
