= Vika Line =

Railway line in Vika, Oslo

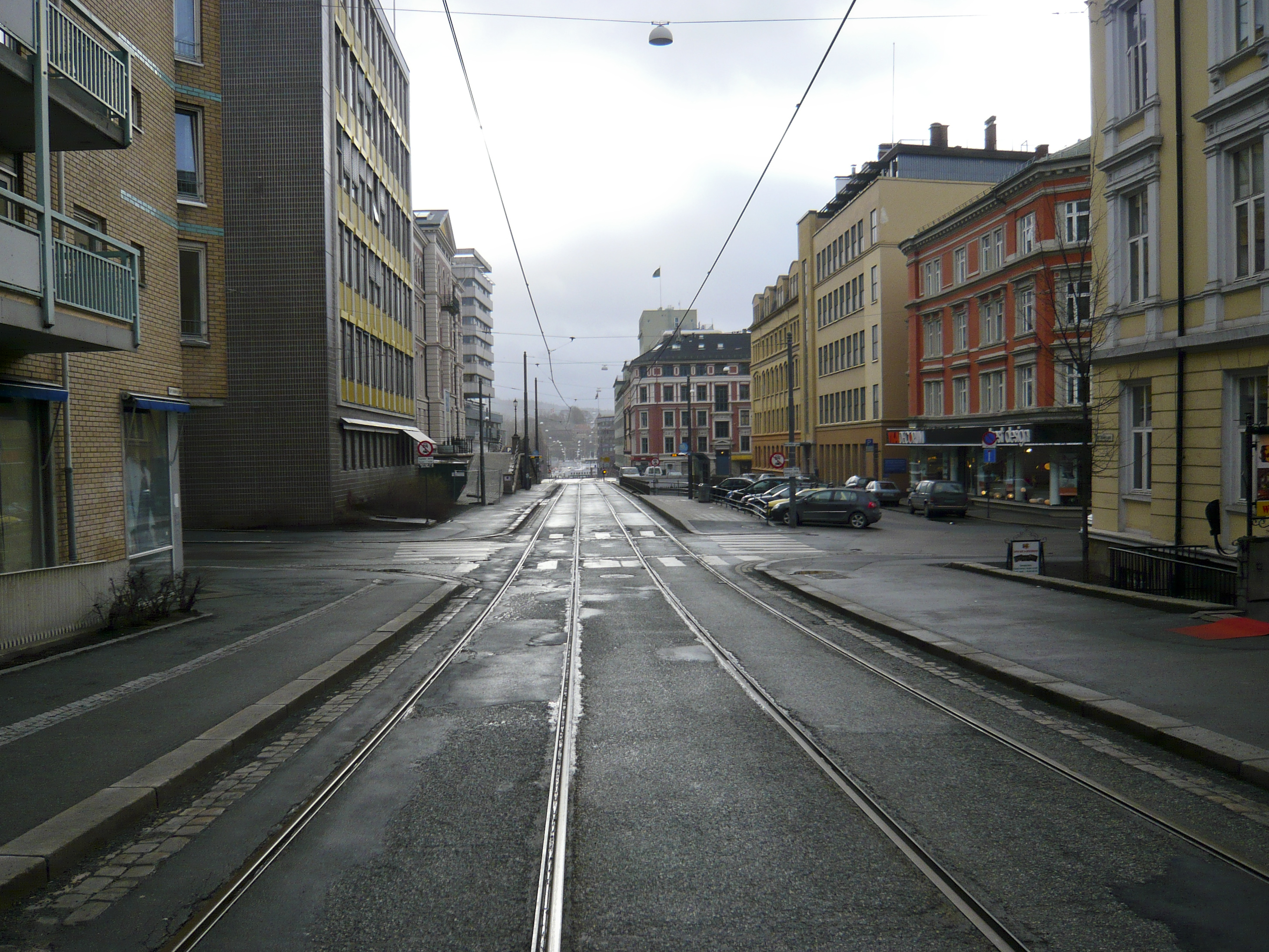

Overview
- Native name: Vikatrikken
- Status: Operating
- Owner: Sporveien
- Locale: Oslo, Norway
- Termini: Øvre Slottsgate; Solli
- Stations: Aker Brygge, Kontraskjerat, Ruseløkka

Service
- Type: Tramway
- System: Oslo Tramway
- Operator(s): Sporveien Trikken
- Rolling stock: SL79

History
- Opened: 21 August 1995

Technical
- Line length: 1.6 km (0.99 mi)
- Number of tracks: Double
- Track gauge: 1,435 mm (4 ft 8 1/2 in)
- Electrification: 750 V DC
- Operating speed: 50 km/h (31 mph)

The Vika Line (Norwegian: Vikatrikken) is a light rail section of the Oslo Tramway in Oslo, Norway. It runs between Wessels plass, through the neighborhood of Vika and Aker Brygge, before arriving at Solli. The section is served by SL79 trams on line 12. The line is owned by the municipal company Kollektivtransportproduksjon, and operated by its subsidiary Oslo Sporvognsdrift.

The line was opened on 21 August 1995 to serve the newly redeveloped areas with a high concentration of jobs. From 1875 to 1961, the Vika area has also been served by the Vestbanen Line. The line serves the large working areas at Aker Brygge, that has many corporate head offices, as well as the Oslo City Hall and The City Hall Square. The line provides connection to the city's water bus services to Nesodden and Bygdøy.

== History ==
=== Vestbanen Line ===
The first line at Vika was built by Kristiania Sporveisselskab, and opened as a horsecar route from Oslo West Station to Stortorvet on 10 October 1875. It was electrified in 1899, and extended to Skillebekk in 1909, as what became the Skøyen Line. The Vestbanen Line was closed in 1961, one year after the city council decided to gradually close the city's tramway.

=== Planning ===
During the 1980s, the former shipyard of Akers Mekaniske Verksted at Vika went through an urban redevelopment. Several large companies started building corporate head offices at the area known as Aker Brygge, that also featured shopping and residential areas. The Vika area had by the mid-1990s 5,000 residents and 30,000 jobs. With the construction of the Festning Tunnel, it would also become possible to make The City Hall Square, the square in front of Oslo City Hall, car-free.

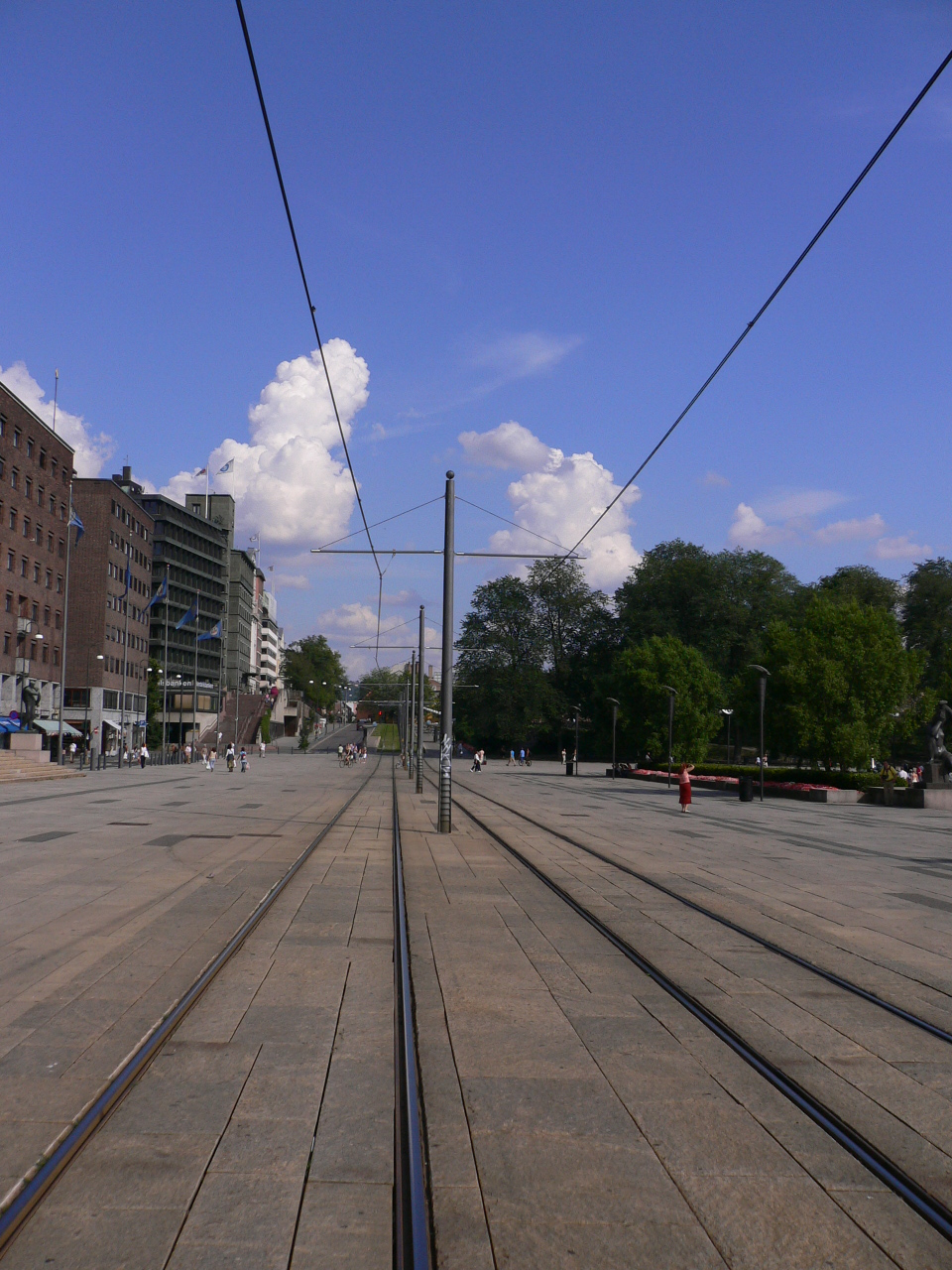
The City Hall Square

Plans were launched in a report in 1989, that summarized the possibilities for different public transport expansions throughout Oslo. In October, an agreement was reached where the 48 million kr to build the line would be split evenly between the municipality, the state and the private real estate developers: Aker Eiendom, Olav Thon Eiendomsselskap and Berdal Strømme. By 1990, municipal-owned Oslo Sporveier, the then owner and operator of the tramway, stated that the project would be profitable, and contribute NOK 4.9 million per year to the company. This meant that the municipality could recover the investment within three years.

In 1992, the city council gave funding for the project. One of the suggestions for the private financing of the project, was for the companies to create a kommandittselskap, and purchase two trams from the city for NOK 8 million each. The Vika Line was also seen as part of a possible light rail version of the Ring Line—a circular line that was to connect northern Oslo between east and west without passing through the city center. Had the light rail solution not been discarded in favor of making the ring part of the Oslo T-bane, the Vika trams would, after reaching Majorstuen, have continued onwards towards Rikshospitalet, that opened in 1999, and Nydalen.

=== Construction ===
The city council made the final decision to build the line on 18 May 1994, supported by the Labour Party, Socialist Left Party, Centre Party and the Red Electoral Alliance. The right-winged opposition parties opposed the suggestion, arguing that financing was not yet finalized, and that they wanted to have The City Hall Square completely free of all traffic, not just automobiles. City Commissioner of Transport and the Environment, Raymond Johansen from the Socialist Left Party, argued that building the line would creating a more people-friendly city center, and allow the different parts of the city center to be better connected with public transport.

Construction started on 18 August 1994, when Raymond Johansen lay down the first track. By then, inflation had adjusted the construction cost to NOK 53.5 million. The line opened on 21 August 1995. When the line opened, it was served by two lines: no. 10 Jar–Sinsen–Disen and no. 15 Majorstuen–Frogner–Sagene. The line was the first new street tram line to be built in Oslo since the Sinsen Line opened in 1939. Estimates before opening showed that the line should have 900,000 riders the first year. By June 1996, the two lines had a daily ridership increase of 2,300, a 19% increase.

With the redevelopment of the Bjørvika and Vippetangen areas, located east of The City Hall Square, three other segments of tramway have been proposed to be built along the fjord edge, and could connect to the Vika Line in the future.

== Route ==
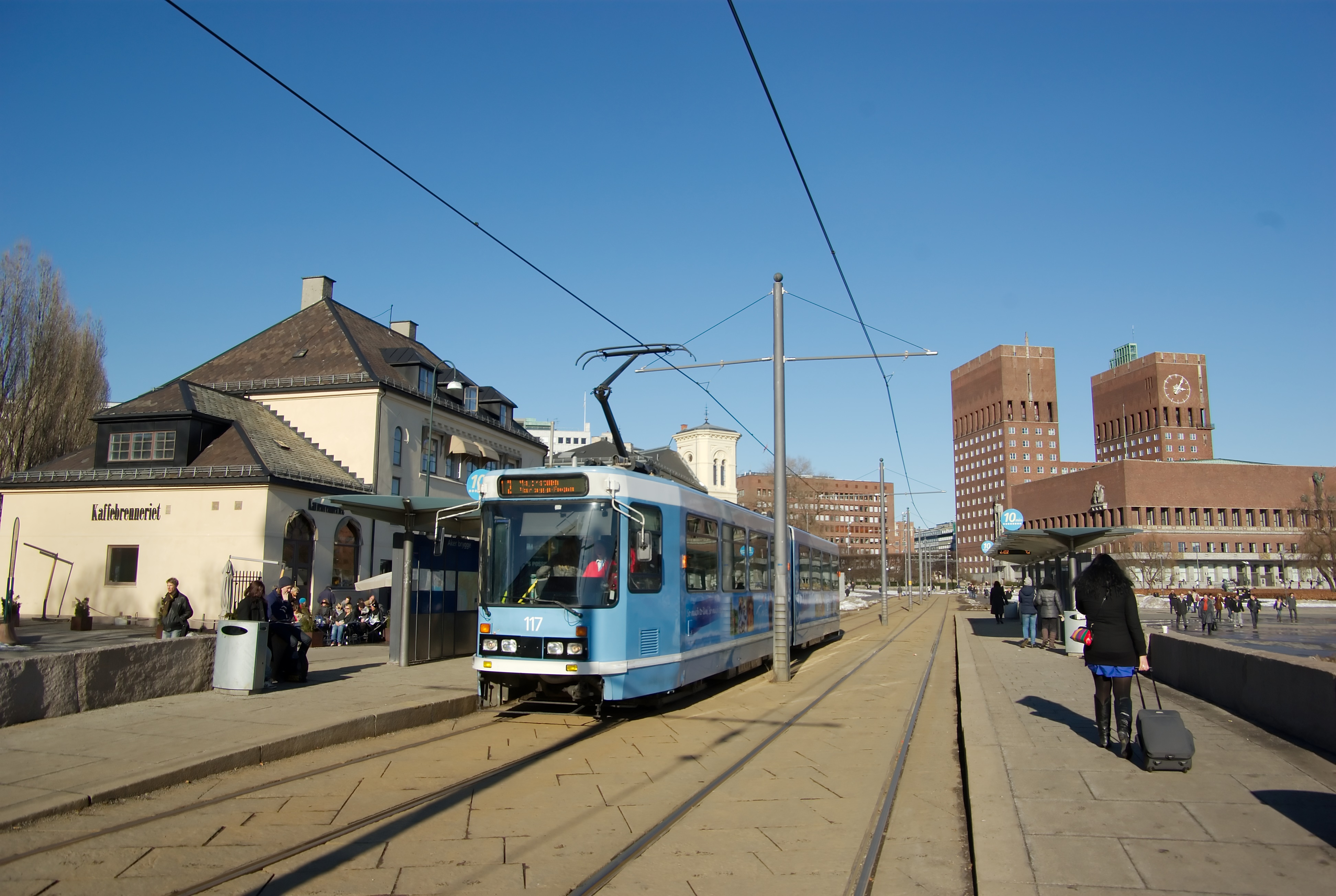
The tram station at Aker brygge with an SL79 tram.

The Vika Line is served by line 12 of the Oslo Tramway. Services are each ten minutes, with reduced frequency in evening and on weekends. All lines are operated with SL79 articulated trams by Oslo Sporvognsdrift, on contract with Ruter. The trams and tracks are owned by the municipal company Kollektivtransportproduksjon. The line is 1.6 kilometres (0.99 mi) long.

The line follows the streets Rosenkrantz gate, The City Hall Square and Cort Adelers gate. It has unique stations: Christiania torv, Rådhusplassen, Aker brygge and Vikatorvet. The new stations on the route are Kontraskjerat, Aker Brygge and Ruseløkka. It intercepts the Skøyen Line at Wessels plass to the east, where the trams continue to the city center. In the west, the line intercepts with the Skøyen- and Frogner Line at Solli. Only along The City Hall Square and Cort Adlers gate at Vikatorvet does the new line follow the route of the former Vestbanen Line.

At The City Hall Square, there is transfer to the ferry quay for Oslo Fergene, that operates route 91 on contract with Ruter to Bygdøy. At Aker Brygge, there is transfer with Nesodden–Bundefjord Dampskipsselskap, that operates Ruter route 601 ferries to Nesodden. Transfer to line 13 of the tramway, that serves the Skøyen- and Lilleaker Line is possible at Solli; transfer to line 19, that serves the Briskeby Line, is possible at Wessels plass and Kirkegata. All other tram routes can be reached at Stortorvet. Transfer to the rapid transit (T-bane) and railway are available at Kirkeristen, where they connect to Jernbanetorget, Oslo Central Station and Oslo Bus Terminal.

Aker Brygge is a large working area, and features the head offices of several of Norway's largest companies, including DnB NOR, Storebrand and Aker. It also has 70 stores and 40 restaurants. Also located in the area is the former Western Railway Station, that today's hosts the Nobel Peace Center. At The City Hall Square is the Oslo City Hall, and the square borders to the recreational and historical area of Akershus Fortress.
