= Oslo Hospital tram stop =

Tram stop in Oslo, Norway

Oslo Hospital
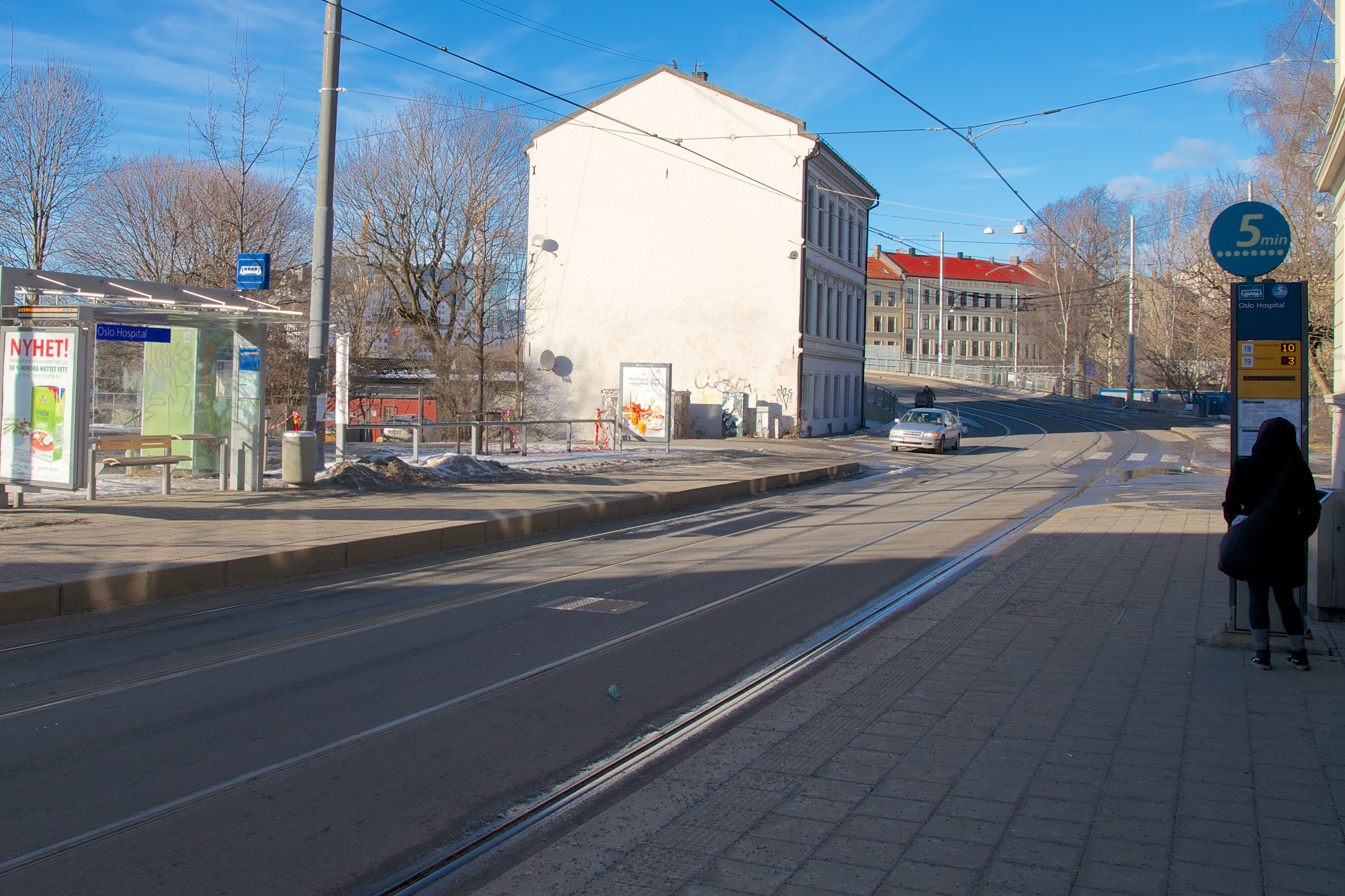
- Oslo Hospital, Mars 2013

General information
- Location: Gamlebyen, Oslo; Norway
- Coordinates: 59.9032°N 10.7674°E
- Lines: Bjørvika Line; Ekeberg Line

History
- Opened: 2 December 1878
Location

Oslo Hospital is a light rail tram stop on the Ekeberg Line of the Oslo Tramway. It is located near Oslo Hospital in Ekeberg, in the borough of Gamlebyen, in Oslo, Norway.

The station opened on 2 December 1878 as the terminus of the second segment of the Gamleby Line built by Kristiania Sporveisselskab. It was renamed following the change of name of the city from Kristiania to Oslo in 1925. On 11 June 1917 it also became the first station on the Ekeberg Line, after Ekebergbanen had built the suburban tramway to Sæter. The station is served by lines 13 and 19, using both SL79 and SL95 trams. It is currently the terminus of the Bjørvika Line.

Preceding station	Trams in Oslo	Following station
Middelalderparken towards Bekkestua	Line 13	Ekebergparken towards Ljabru
Middelalderparken towards Majorstuen	Line 19	Ekebergparken towards Ljabru
