= List of Oslo Metro lines =

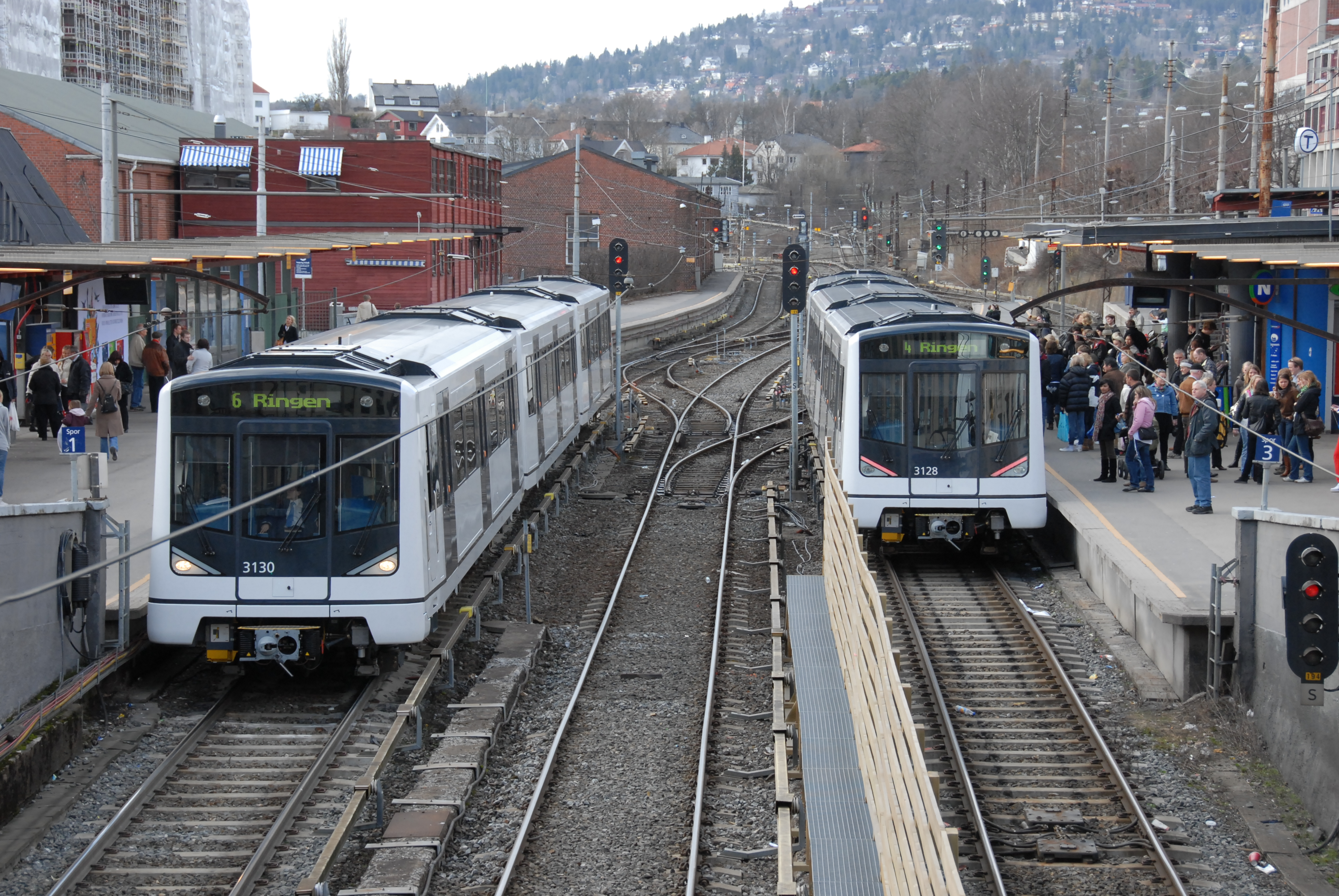
Two MX3000 trains at Majorstuen

A geographically accurate map of the metro, with important stations. All lines run through the Common Line, and lines 4 and 6 continue through the Ring Line, swapping service numbers.

The Oslo Metro is a rapid transit system serving Oslo and Bærum in Norway. The system is municipally owned by Sporveien, and operated by its subsidiary Sporveien T-banen under contract to Ruter, the Oslo public transport authority. The metro has a daily ridership of 200,000, and serves 101 stations. The system consists of eight lines that operate as branches from the Common Tunnel—the shared section that runs 4.8 kilometers (3.0 mi) through the city center. In addition, the Ring Line operates in a loop north of the city center. There are six train services, numbered 1 through 6, that each operate from one branch via the city center to another branch or to the Ring Line. All services run every 15 minutes. Each branch has one service that operates to its terminus, except for the Lambertseter Line that has two.

The first part of the metro was the Holmenkollen Line, that opened as light rail in 1898. The Røa Line followed as a branch in 1912. The system became the first Nordic underground railway in 1928, when the underground line to Nationaltheatret was opened. The Østensjø Line opened in 1923, the Kolsås Line in 1924, and the Sognsvann Line in 1934. The Kolsås Line opened as an extension of the Lilleaker Line, but in 1942 it was connected to the Common Tunnel, while the rest of the Lilleaker Line remains as a light rail connected to the Oslo Tramway. The opening of the upgraded metro system in the eastern boroughs occurred in 1966, after the conversion of the 1957 Lambertseter Line to metro standard. This involves the lines using third rail instead of overhead wires, having 110-meter (360 ft) long platforms and automatic train protection in-cab signaling. It was followed by the conversion of the Østensjø Line, as well as the new Grorud Line and Furuset Line. In 1993, trains could, for the first time, run through the city between the two networks in the Common Tunnel. The latest extension is the 2006 opening of the Ring Line, that connects the eastern and western network north of the city center.

Parts of the system have been upgraded from light rail to metro standard. The Østensjø and Lambertseter Lines were converted in 1966, when the first sections of new metro line were opened. The Sognsvann and Røa Lines, as well as the western part of the Common Tunnel, were upgraded in 1993 and 1995. The Holmenkollen and Kolsås Lines were upgraded and subsequently re-opened in 2011 and 2014, respectively. Following the upgrade, all T1000 stock can be retired and replaced by the new MX3000 trains. The Grorud and Lambertseter Lines serve the Groruddalen valley while the Østensjø and Lambertseter Line serve the southern areas of Nordstrand. These four lines have the highest ridership. In the west, the Kolsås, Røa, Holmenkoll and Sognsvann Lines serves less densely populated areas. The Ring Line serves the northern borough of Nordre Aker, while the Common Tunnel serves the city center.

== List ==
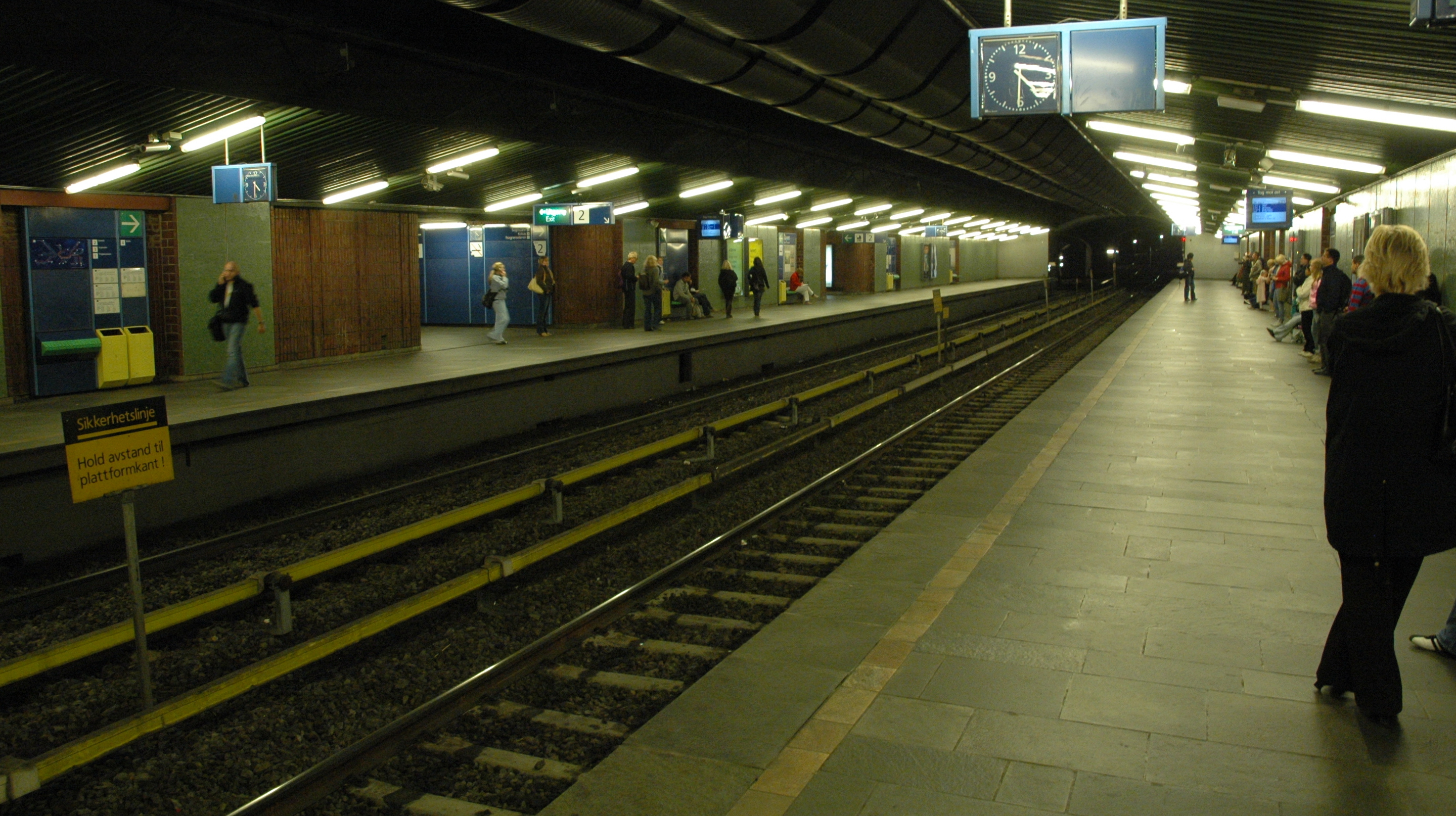
Underground section of the Common Tunnel at Tøyen Station

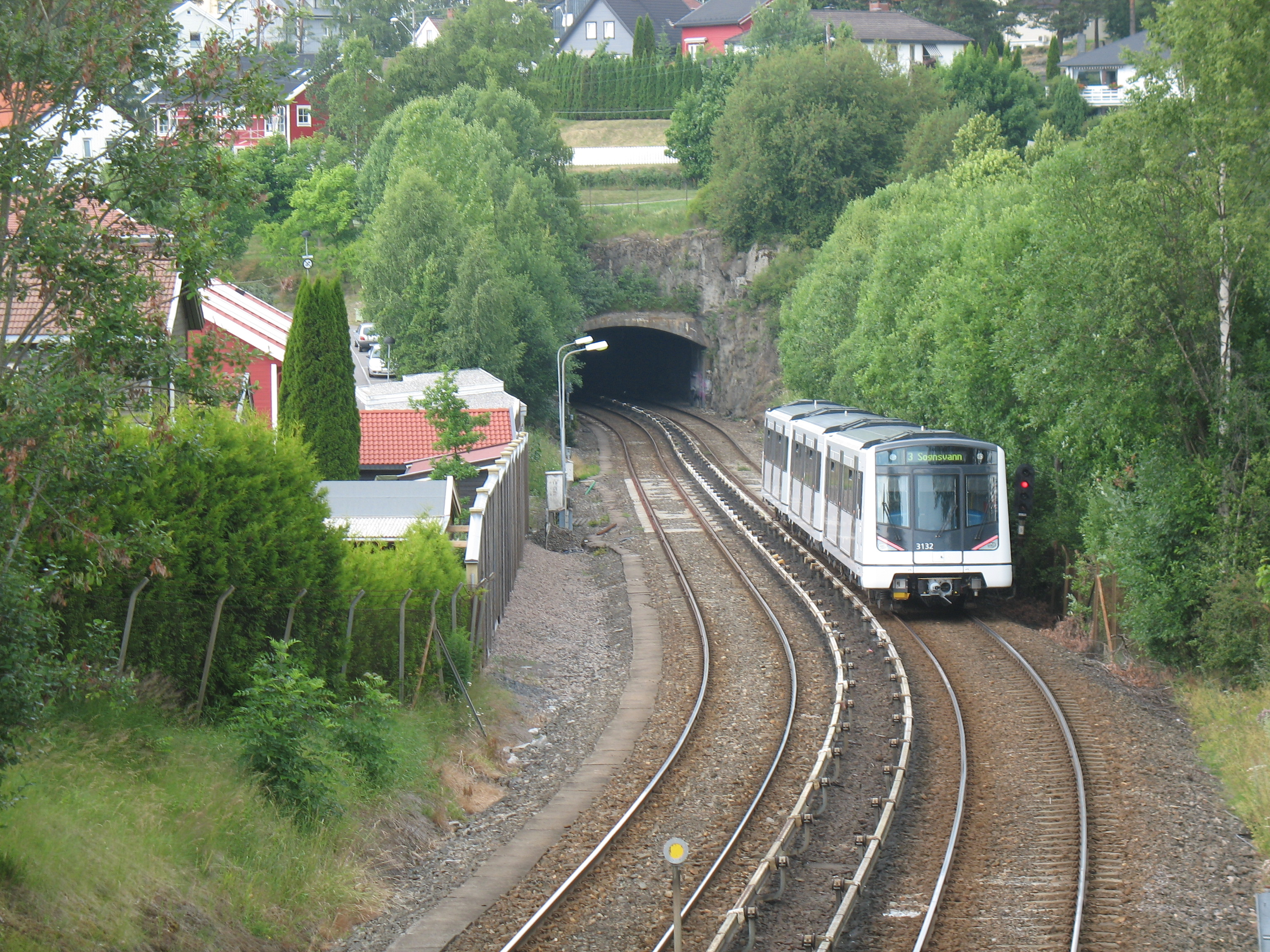
An MX3000 train on the Østensjø Line

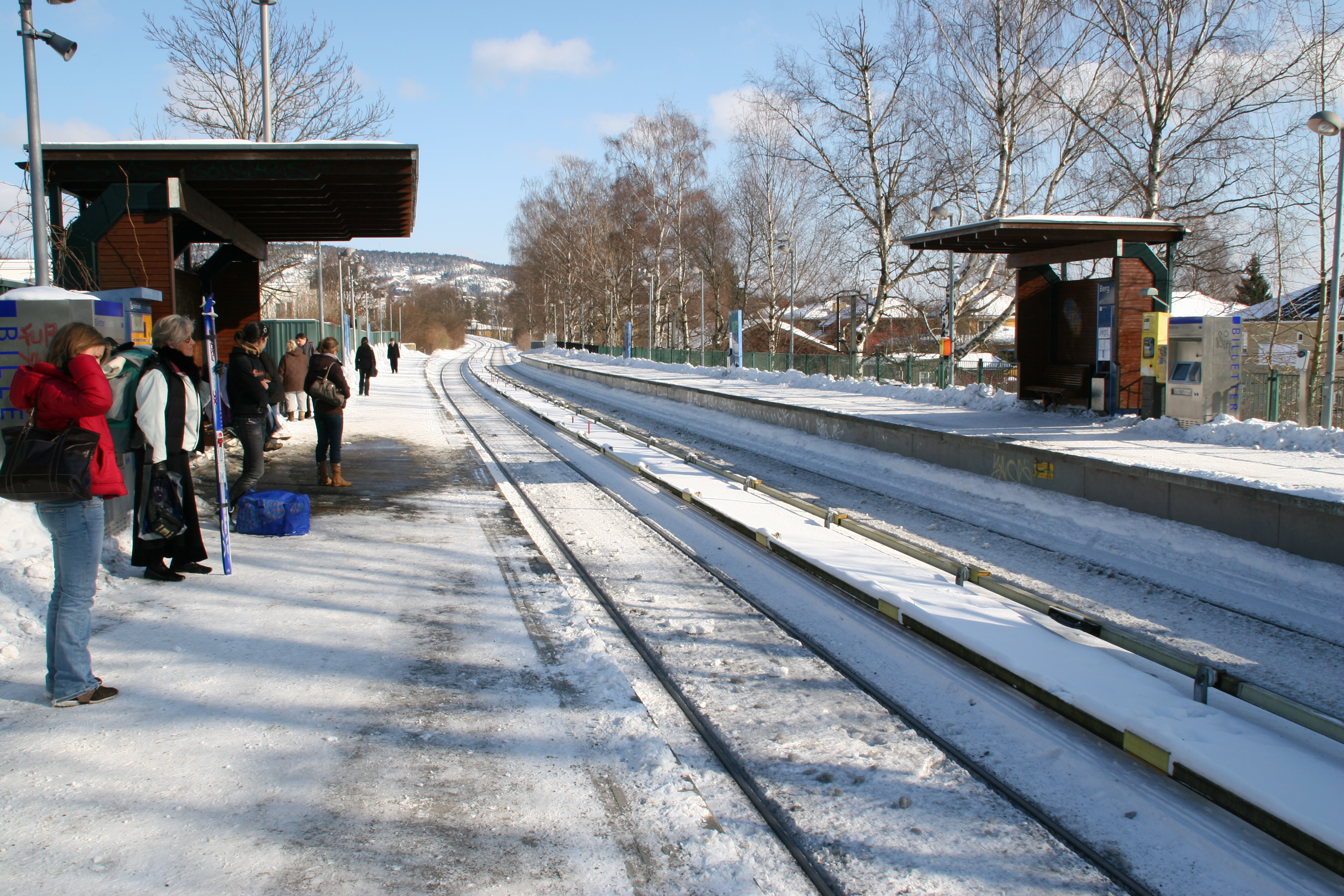
Berg Station on the Sognsvann Line

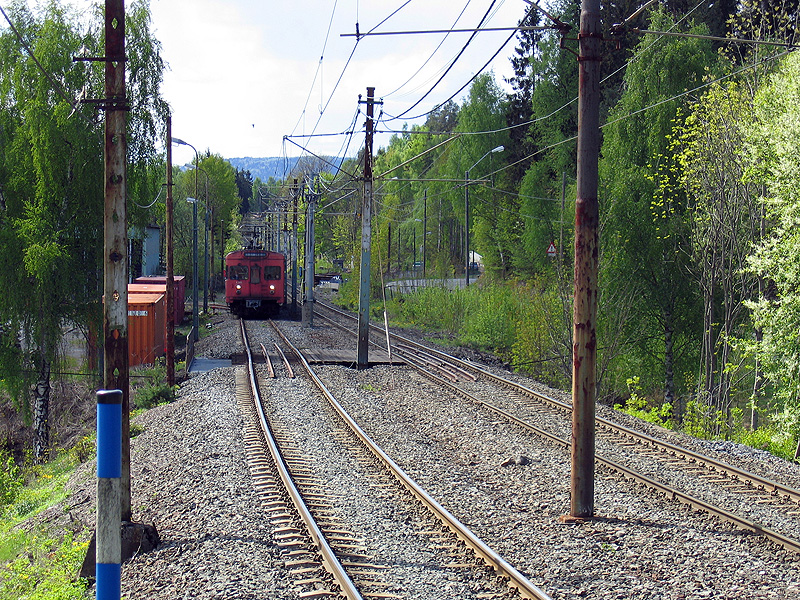
A T1300 train on the Kolsås Line, when the line was still light rail

The following table presents the eleven lines of the Oslo Metro. They are chronologically sorted by the date of the first section of line to open. The service column indicates which of the six numbered services operates on most of the lines. Services are omitted from lines where they serve only one or two stations. The date indicates the official opening date of the line on the section noted in the fourth column. Sections with blue background indicate lines that were opened as tramways, while white background indicates the line was converted to or built as metro standard. The length column indicates the total length of the line at the time of opening or upgrade, and the extension column indicates the length of the extension. The station column indicates the number of stations on the line after the opening of each extension or upgrade. Unless specified otherwise, the lines are metro standard.

*	Light rail

Line	Service	Opened	Section	Length		Extension		Stations
Line	Service	Opened	Section	km	mi	km	mi	Stations
Holmenkollen*	Oslo Metro	31 May 1898	Majorstuen – Besserud*	6.3	3.9	6.3	3.9	14
Holmenkollen*	Oslo Metro	16 May 1916	Besserud – Frognerseteren*	11.7	7.3	5.4	3.4	20
Røa	Oslo Metro	17 November 1912	Majorstuen – Smestad*	1.9	1.2	1.9	1.2	4
Røa	Oslo Metro	24 January 1935	Smestad – Røa*	4.8	3.0	2.9	1.8	10
Røa	Oslo Metro	22 December 1948	Røa – Grini*	5.7	3.5	0.9	0.6	12
Røa	Oslo Metro	3 December 1951	Grini – Lijordet*	6.9	4.3	1.2	0.75	14
Røa	Oslo Metro	16 November 1971	Lijordet – Østerås*	7.5	4.7	0.6	0.4	15
Røa	Oslo Metro	5 February 1992	Metro standard Lijordet – Østerås	7.5	—	10		
Østensjø	Oslo Metro	18 December 1923	Helsfyr – Brynseng*	0.8	0.5	0.8	0.5	2
Østensjø	Oslo Metro	10 January 1926	Brynseng – Oppsal*	4.0	2.5	3.2	2.0	4
Østensjø	Oslo Metro	20 July 1958	Oppsal – Bøler*	5.4	3.4	1.4	0.9	6
Østensjø	Oslo Metro	29 October 1967	Metro standard Tøyen – Bøler	7.1	4.4	1.7	1.1	8
Østensjø	Oslo Metro	26 November 1967	Bøler – Skullerud	9.2	5.7	2.1	1.3	10
Østensjø	Oslo Metro	4 January 1998	Skullerud – Mortensrud	11.5	7.1	2.3	1.4	11
Kolsås	Oslo Metro	3 November 1924	Jar – Avløs*	4.5	2.8	4.5	2.8	8
Kolsås	Oslo Metro	1 January 1930	Avløs – Kolsås*	7.8	4.8	3.3	2.1	12
Kolsås	Oslo Metro	15 June 1942	Jar – Sørbyhaugen*	11.8	7.3	4.0	2.5	17
Kolsås	Oslo Metro	20 August 2008	Metro standard Husebybakken – Åsjordet	2.3	1.4	—	3	
Common	Oslo Metro	28 June 1928	Majorstuen – Nationaltheatret*	2.0	1.2	2.0	1.2	3
Common	Oslo Metro	22 May 1966	Tøyen – Jernbanetorget	1.6	1.0	1.6	1.0	3
Common	Oslo Metro	9 January 1977	Jernbanetorget – Stortinget	2.1	1.3	0.5	0.3	4
Common	Oslo Metro	6 March 1987	Stortinget – Nationaltheatret*	4.8	3.0	0.7	0.4	6
Common	Oslo Metro	5 May 1992	Metro standard Stortinget – Majorstuen	4.8	—			6
Sognsvann	Oslo Metro	10 October 1934	Frøen – Sognsvann*	6.0	3.7	6.0	3.7	11
Sognsvann	Oslo Metro	5 May 1992	Metro standard Majorstuen – Sognsvann	6.0	—	9		
Lambertseter	Oslo Metro	26 April 1957	Brynseng – Bergkrystallen*	5.9	3.7	5.9	3.7	8
Lambertseter	Oslo Metro	22 May 1966	Metro standard Brynseng – Bergkrystallen	5.9	—			8
Grorud	Oslo Metro	16 October 1966	Tøyen – Grorud	9.2	5.7	9.2	5.7	11
Grorud	Oslo Metro	3 March 1974	Grorud – Rommen	10.5	6.5	1.3	0.8	13
Grorud	Oslo Metro	18 August 1974	Rommen – Stovner	12.2	7.6	1.7	1.1	14
Grorud	Oslo Metro	21 December 1975	Stovner – Vestli	13.6	8.5	1.4	0.9	15
Furuset	Oslo Metro	18 November 1970	Hellerud – Haugerud	2.0	1.2	2.0	1.2	2
Furuset	Oslo Metro	15 December 1974	Haugerud – Trosterud	2.9	1.8	0.9	0.6	3
Furuset	Oslo Metro	19 February 1978	Trosterud – Furuset	5.3	3.3	2.4	1.5	5
Furuset	Oslo Metro	8 November 1981	Furuset – Ellingsrudåsen	6.5	4.0	1.2	0.7	6
Ring	Oslo Metro	20 August 2003	Ullevål stadion – Storo	3.3	2.1	3.3	2.1	2
Ring	Oslo Metro	21 August 2006	Storo – Carl Berners plass	5.0	3.1	1.2	0.7	3
Løren	Oslo Metro	3 April 2016	Nydalen – Økern	1.6	0.99	1.6	0.99	1
