= Ammerud station =

Oslo metro station

Ammerud
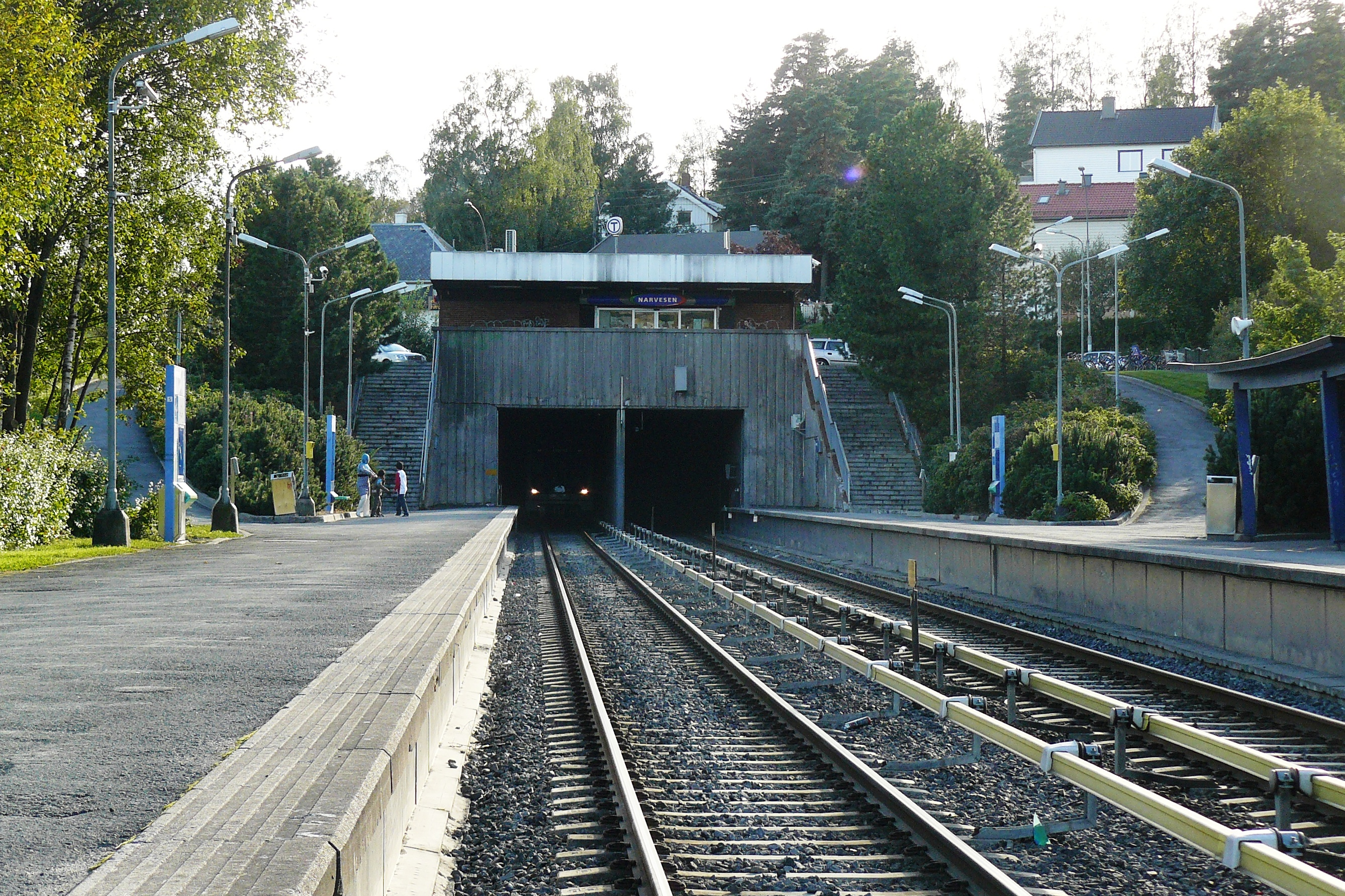

General information
- Location: Ammerud, Oslo; Norway
- Coordinates: 59°57′28″N 10°52′15″E
- Owner: Sporveien
- Operator: Sporveien T-banen
- Line: Grorud Line
- Distance: 10.6 km (6.6 mi) from Stortinget

Construction
- Structure type: At-grade
- Accessible: Yes

History
- Opened: 16 October 1966
Location

Ammerud is the station on Grorud Line of the Oslo Metro between Kalbakken and Grorud. It is located in the Grorud borough. Ammerud is part of the original stretch of Grorudbanen opened 16 October 1966.

The Ammerud neighborhood is mostly residential. The subway station is located on the south side and much of the neighborhood is beyond reasonable walking distance, so a shuttle bus is required. Formerly Oslo University College had their faculty for business, public administration and social work at Ammerud before moving downtown.

Preceding station	Oslo Metro	Following station
Kalbakken towards Bergkrystallen	Line 4	Grorud towards Vestli
Kalbakken towards Ring Line and Sognsvann	Line 5	Grorud towards Vestli
