= Løren Line =

Metro line in Oslo, Norway

Coordinates: 59.9381°N 10.7813°E

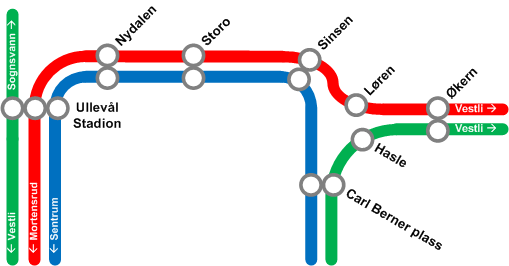
- Schematic of the line

Overview
- Native name: Lørenbanen
- Owner: Sporveien
- Termini: Sinsen (Ring Line); Økern (Grorud Line)
- Stations: 1

Service
- Type: Rapid transit
- System: Oslo Metro
- Operator(s): Sporveien T-banen
- Rolling stock: MX3000

History
- Opened: 3 April 2016

Technical
- Line length: 1.6 km (0.99 mi)
- Number of tracks: Double
- Track gauge: 1,435 mm (4 ft 8 1/2 in) standard gauge
- Electrification: 750 V DC third rail
- Operating speed: 70 km/h (43 mph)

The Løren Line (Norwegian: Lørenbanen) is a 1.6-kilometer (1.0 mi) line of the Oslo Metro. Located entirely underground, it runs through the neighborhoods of Sinsen, Løren and Økern in Bjerke, creating a connection between the Ring Line with the Grorud Line. The line features one station, Løren. It is served by metro trains which run down the Grorud Line and then connect to the Ring Line. It allows for higher capacity on the metro as more passengers a transported via the Ring Line instead of through the congested Common Tunnel. Construction started in June 2013 and the line opened on 3 April 2016.

== Route ==
The Løren Line is a 1.6-kilometer (0.99 mi) long section of Oslo Metro between Sinsen and Økern, connecting the Ring Line with the Grorud Line. It consists of one intermediate station, Løren. The line runs entirely in a tunnel, consisting of 1,400 meters (4,600 ft) of tunnel through bedrock and 170 meters (560 ft) in a concrete culvert. The line runs north a mostly parallel to the mainline Alna Line. In the west the line branches off the Ring Line in a tunnel section south of Sinsen. Each track of the Løren Line forks off in a separate tunnel and then head east while the Ring Line turns southwest. The line runs in two tubes to Løren Station, after which they merge into a single tube. The station is situated 27 meters (89 ft) below the surface in the redevelopment area of Lørenbyen. The station has an area of 6,200 square meters (67,000 sq ft) and has an entrance from each end. The line then makes a U-turn and branches into the Grorud Line between the stations of Hasle and Økern.

== Service ==
The line receives a service which runs along the Grorud Line, cuts along the Løren Line and then runs through the Ring Line. The trains run every fifteen minutes—half the departures along the Grorud Line. The Løren Line allows for ten minutes saved for riders heading from the Grorud Line to stations on the Ring Line, and allows the same travel time to Majorstuen. Løren Station is estimated to receive six thousand daily passengers, making it among the ten busiest on the metro network. The changes will reduce the number of services from the Grorud Line to the Common Tunnel. The increased capacity will allow the Østensjø Line to double the number of services.

== History ==
The Grorud Line was built as part of the original metro network and opened on 16 November 1966. The Ring Line was built in two stages between 2000 and 2006. Oslo Sporveier announced in 2005 that it planned to double the number of services on the Grorud Line, to eight per hour. However, the bottleneck of the system is the Common Tunnel through the city center and services on all branches of the metro are limited by the capacity of that line. With the Ring Line under way, planners started to look at how it could be used to increase traffic flow and capacity of the metro. This would allow traffic to be diverted around the Ring Line instead of through the Common Tunnel, increasing capacity on the system as a whole.

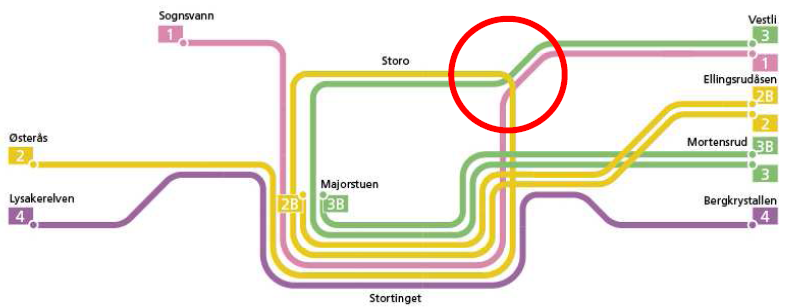
A 2006 schematic which shows the operating principle of the metro with the Løren Line. Since the Holmenkollen Line and the Kolsås Line have both been added to the operating concept.

Five alternatives were proposed in 2007, which considered various ways to connect the Grorud Line and the Ring Line. Variations included building part of the line with single track and whether or not to construct a station at Løren. The latter would increase the price, but would give the area a significantly better transit service. As of 2007 the area was only served by a bus every twenty minutes. Funding of the Løren Line was secured as part of Oslo Package 3. During planning the line was variously known as the Løren Curve (Lørensvingen) and the Hastle Curve (Haslesvingen).

An alternative or supplemental proposals has been to use the Alna Line as a cross-town services of the Oslo Commuter Rail. Both the Norwegian National Rail Administration and Ruter have investigated the possibility to run services from the Trunk Line across the Alna Line and up the Gjøvik Line, but have found a too low traffic potential to carry out the proposal.

The Løren Line is being built at the same time as the Løren, Hasle and Økern area is undergoing a major redevelopment. While the area previously has had some residential areas and has mostly been dominated by industry, it has now been designated a primary site for urban development in Oslo. The area has a potential for 25,000 residences and 2.5 million square meters (25 million sq ft) of commercial area. Oslo Municipal Council approved in May 2013 the construction of 730 apartments in the immediate vicinity of the station.

Planning of the Løren Line is part of a wider concept of building additional rail-based services across Groruddalen. There are three lines, two metro lines and the mainline Trunk Line, which run down the valley, but there is no good system for crossing the valley. This is in part caused by both railways and motorways creating barriers. The municipal authorities are therefore looking at future connections between the metro's Grorud Line and the Furuset Line, with a possible transfer station with the Trunk Line.

The zoning plan allow the line was passed on 14 December 2011.

The contract for the ground work of the line was awarded by Sporveien to Skanska on 13 May 2013 and had a value of 357 million Norwegian krone and construction commenced in June. The project also included upgrade of the stations Rommen, Romsås and Vestli on the Grorud Line. The lower parts of the Grorud Line was closed from September through December to allow construction work on the connection. The Ring Line from Sinsen to Carl Berners plass is similarly proposed closed from June 2014 to March 2015. Construction is scheduled for completion in October 2015 and to be opened in early 2016. Construction was carried out with two crossections, from Anders Winsvoldsvei and Båhusveien at Bilia. In addition, Løres Station was built with the cut-and-cover method, doubling as a crossection.

The line opened on 3 April 2016.
