= Løren station =

Oslo metro station

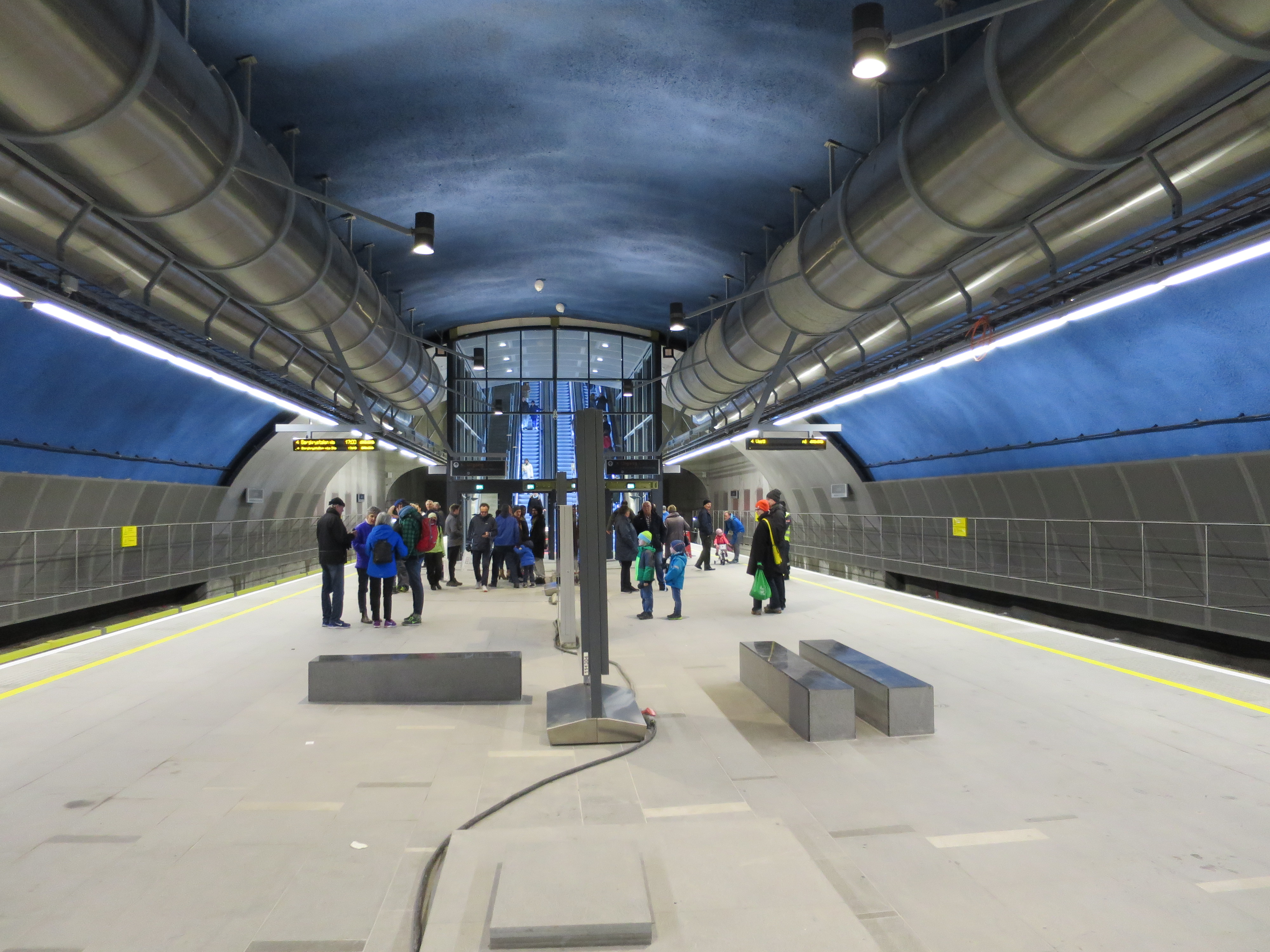
Løren

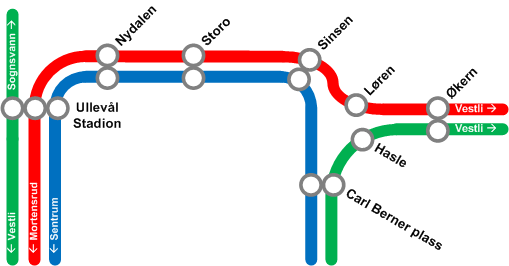
- Map showing the location of the station

General information
- Location: Løren, Oslo; Norway
- Coordinates: 59.9360083°N 10.7883556°E
- Owner: Sporveien
- Operator: Sporveien T-banen
- Line: Løren Line
- Platforms: 1 island platform
- Tracks: 2

Construction
- Structure type: Underground
- Depth: 27 m (89 ft)
- Accessible: Yes
- Architect: Arne Henriksen

Other information
- Fare zone: 1

History
- Opened: 3 April 2016

Passengers
- 2016: 6,000 (weekday average estimate)
Location

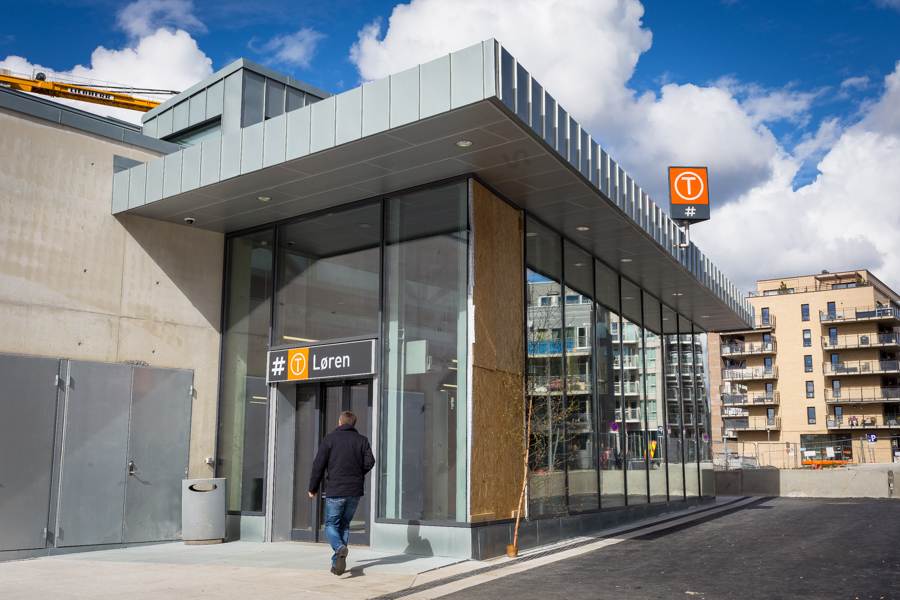
The entrance to Løren Station

Løren station is an underground rapid transit station of the Oslo Metro and the newest on the subway network. Serving the Oslo, Norway, neighborhood of Løren in the borough of Grünerløkka, the station is the only one situated on the Løren Line. Designed by Arne Henriksen, the station is situated 27 meters (89 ft) underground. Construction of the station began in 2013 and was completed in 2016. The station is estimated to have 6,000 daily passengers. It is served every fifteen minutes by trains running along the adjoining Ring Line via the Løren Line to the Grorud Line.

== History ==
The Løren Line is designed to allow higher capacity through the metro system by some trains from the Grorud Line bypassing the Common Tunnel and instead running through the Ring Line. After the Ring Line was completed in 2006, five alternatives were proposed in 2007, which considered various ways to connect the Grorud Line and the Ring Line. Variations included building part of the line with single track and whether or not to construct a station at Løren. The latter would increase the price, but would give the area a significantly better transit service. As of 2007 the area was only served by a bus every twenty minutes. Funding of the Løren Line was secured as part of Oslo Package 3

The Løren, Hasle and Økern area is undergoing a major redevelopment. While the area previously has had some residential areas and has mostly been dominated by industry, it has now been designated a primary site for urban development in Oslo. The area has a potential for 25,000 residences and 2.5 million square meters (25 million sq ft) of commercial area. Oslo Municipal Council approved in May 2013 the construction of 730 apartments in the immediate vicinity of the station. The zoning plan allow the line was passed on 14 December 2011. The winner of the 2012 architecture competition was MDH Arkitekter and Arne Henriksen. Their proposal was backed by structural engineers Aas-Jakobsen. Løren Station was built with the cut-and-cover method, doubling as a cross section.

== Facilities ==
Løren Station is situated in the Løren neighborhood of Bjerke. The station is situated 27 meters (89 ft) below the surface in the redevelopment area of Lørenbyen. The station has an area of 6,200 square meters (67,000 sq ft) and has an entrance from each end.

== Service ==
Service commenced on 3 April 2016. The station is served by line 4 of the Oslo Metro which runs every 15 minutes. It connects both to the Grorud Line and around the Ring Line and to the Common Tunnel. As the only station on the network, passengers from Løren will have to change trains to reach the city center (unless taking a detour around the Ring). Løren Station is estimated to receive six thousand daily passengers, making it among the ten busiest on the metro network.

Preceding station	Oslo Metro	Following station
Sinsen towards Bergkrystallen	Line 4	Økern towards Vestli
