= Romsås (station) =

Oslo metro station

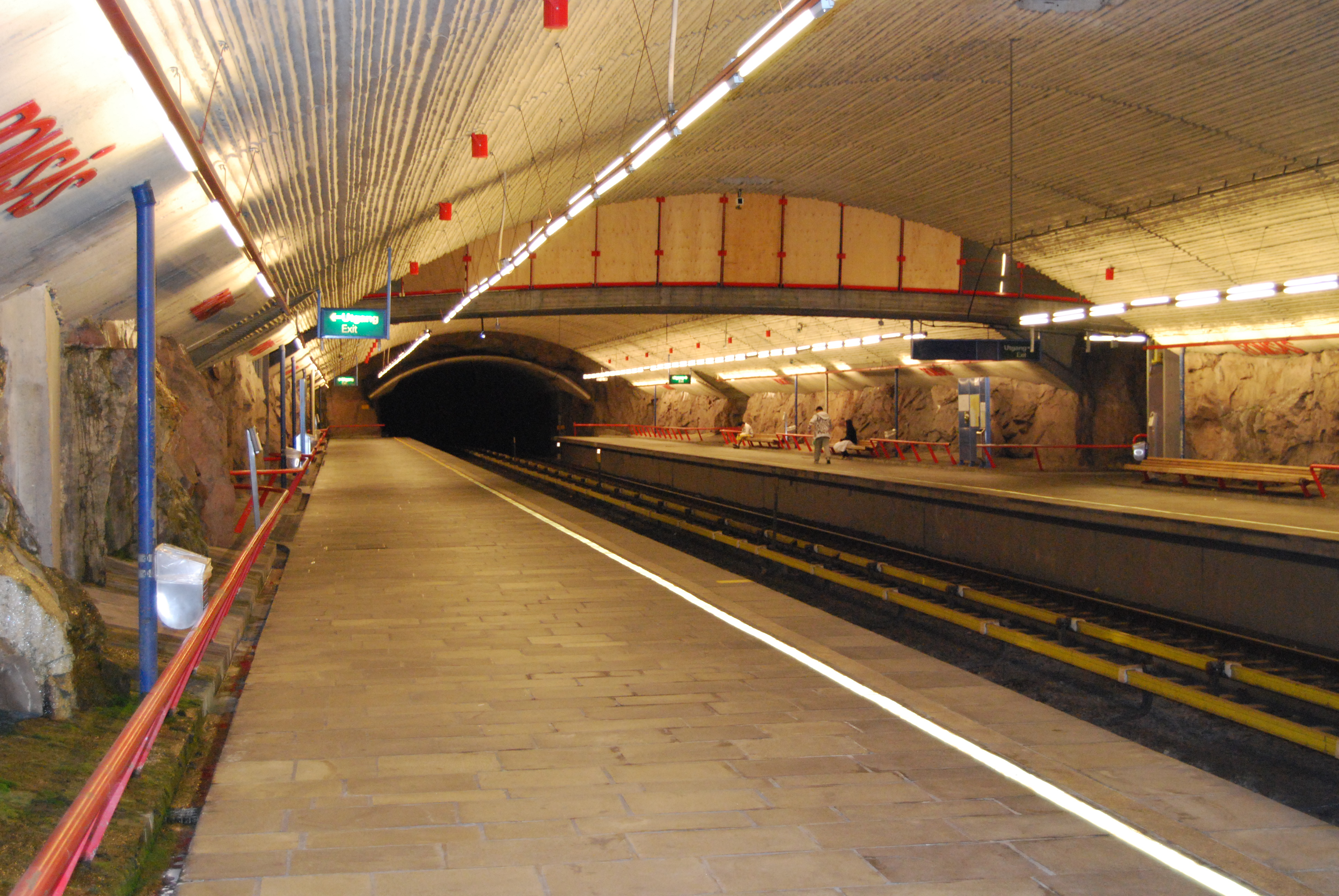

General information
- Location: Romsås, Oslo; Norway
- Coordinates: 59°57′43″N 10°53′26″E
- Elevation: 189.7 m (622 ft)
- Owner: Sporveien
- Operator: Sporveien T-banen
- Line: Grorud Line
- Distance: 12.0 km (7.5 mi) from Stortinget

Construction
- Structure type: Underground
- Accessible: Yes

History
- Opened: 13 March 1974
Location

Romsås is a subway station on the Grorud Line of the Oslo Metro in the Grorud borough. It is located in the tunnel between Grorud and Rommen.

Like Ellingsrudåsen, Romsås has natural mountain walls. The architect Håkon Mjelva together with civil engineer Elliot Strømme and entrepreneur F. Selmer were awarded the Concrete board award for outstanding construction in 1976.

Preceding station	Oslo Metro	Following station
Grorud towards Bergkrystallen	Line 4	Rommen towards Vestli
Grorud towards Ring Line and Sognsvann	Line 5	Rommen towards Vestli
