= Grorud (station) =

Oslo metro station

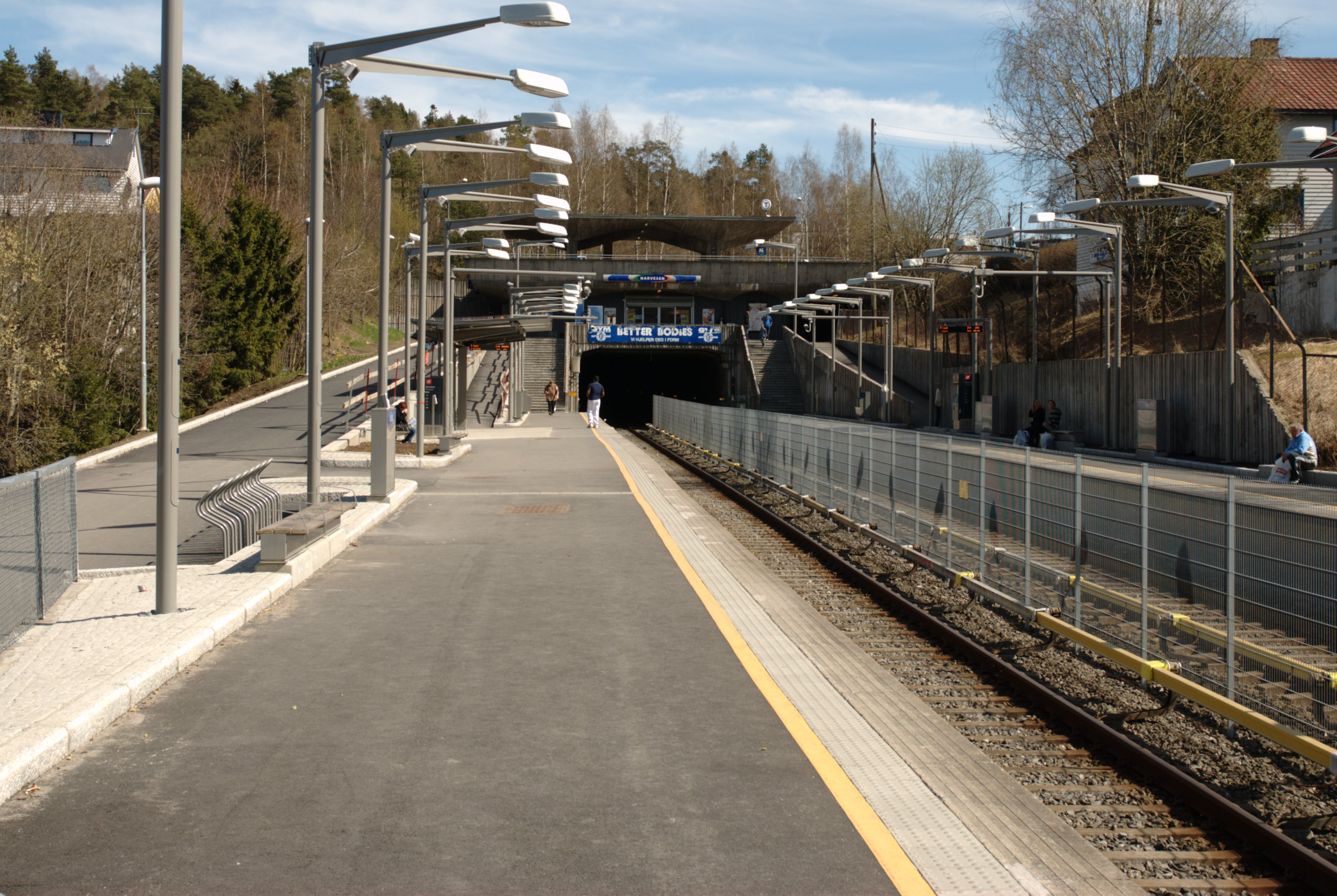

General information
- Location: Grorud, Oslo; Norway
- Coordinates: 59°57′40″N 10°52′53″E
- Elevation: 180.3 m (592 ft)
- Owner: Sporveien
- Operator: Sporveien T-banen
- Line: Grorud Line
- Distance: 11.3 km (7.0 mi) from Stortinget
- Connections: Bus: 31 Fornebu - Snarøya; 62 Ammerud; 63 Romsås Ring; 66 Helsfyr via IKEA; 68 Helsfyr; 79 Åsbråten; 63N Romsås Ring

Construction
- Structure type: At-grade
- Accessible: Yes

History
- Opened: 16 October 1966
Location

Grorud is a rapid transit station on the Oslo Metro. Located between Ammerud and Romsås on Grorud Line, it serves the Grorud borough. The station is located on the south side of a tunnel entrance. Above the station is a small cluster of shops and a small bus terminal.

The station was the end station of the original section of the Grorud Line, which opened 16 October 1966, and remained the end station until it was extended to Rommen on 3 March 1974.

Preceding station	Oslo Metro	Following station
Ammerud towards Bergkrystallen	Line 4	Romsås towards Vestli
Ammerud towards Ring Line and Sognsvann	Line 5	Romsås towards Vestli
