= Stovner (station) =

Oslo Metro station in Norway

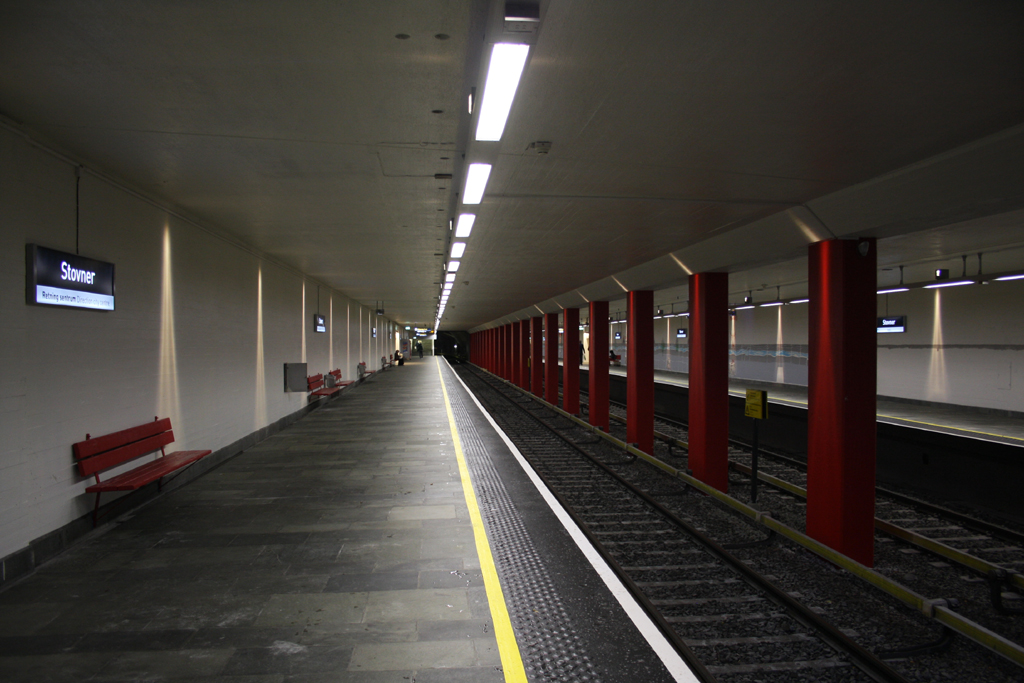

General information
- Location: Stovner, Oslo; Norway
- Coordinates: 59°57′43″N 10°55′23″E
- Owner: Sporveien
- Operator: Sporveien T-banen
- Line: Grorud Line
- Distance: 13.7 km (8.5 mi) from Stortinget
- Connections: 64A Furuset; 64B Furuset; 65 Furuset; 120 Grorud T — Nesåsen; 5N Jernbanetorget — Vestli

Construction
- Structure type: Underground
- Accessible: Yes

History
- Opened: 18 August 1974

Passengers
- 17,096 boarding per weekday
Location

Stovner is a subway station on Grorudbanen (Line 5) on the Oslo Metro, between Rommen and the end station Vestli. It was opened in 1974. The station is underground, at the entry of the tunnel. At or above the station is the large Stovner shopping centre, the Stovner police station, and a small bus terminal. Stovner is mainly a residential area.

Preceding station	Oslo Metro	Following station
Rommen towards Bergkrystallen	Line 4	Vestli Terminus
Rommen towards Ring Line and Sognsvann	Line 5	Vestli Terminus
