= Stovner =

Bydel Stovner
- Borough
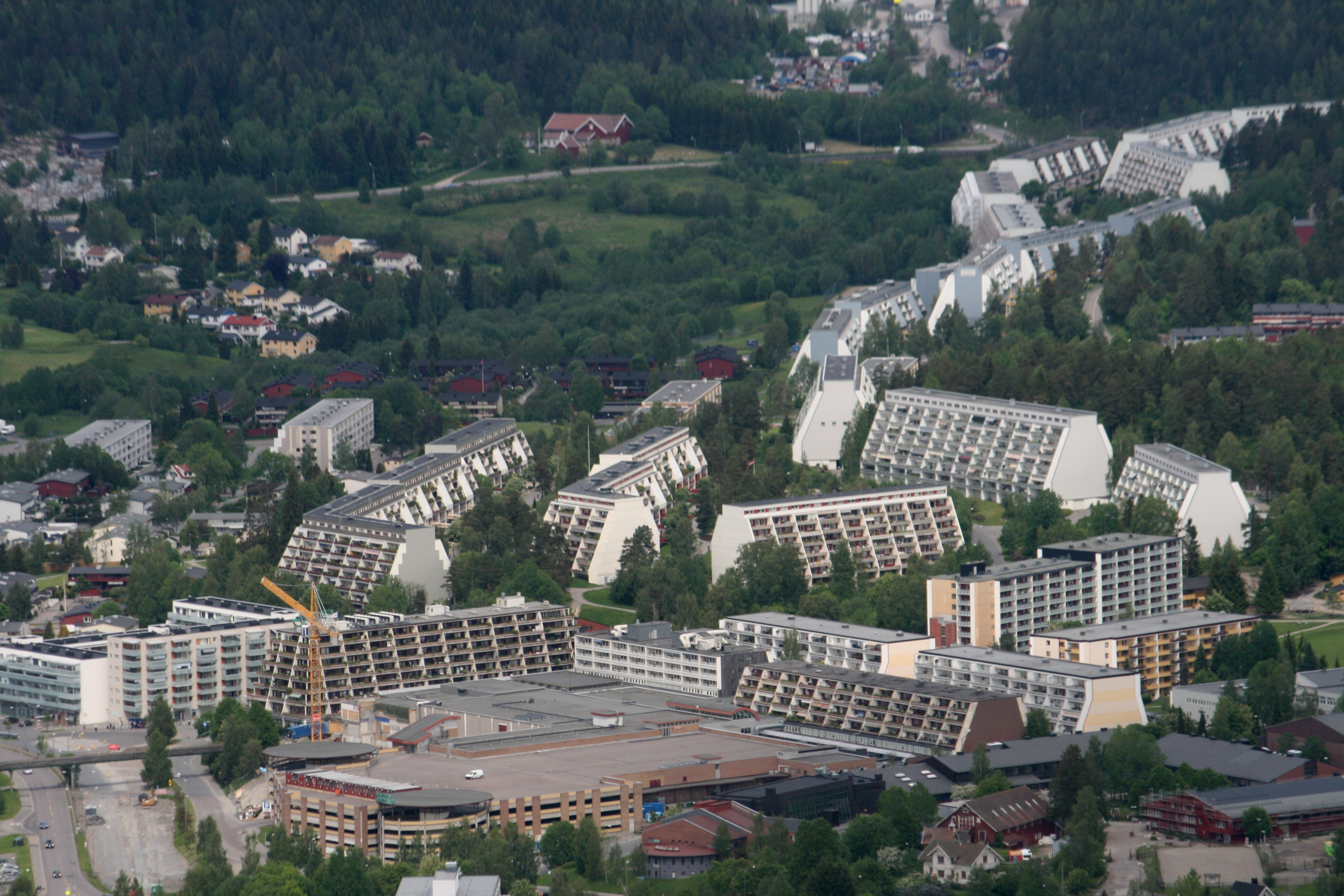

- Coat of arms

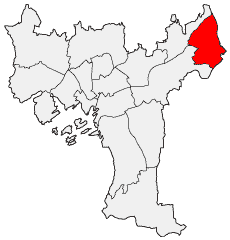
- Coordinates: 59°57′40″N 10°55′36″E
- Country: Norway
- City: Oslo
- District: Grorud Valley

Area
  - Total: 8.250 km^{2} (3.185 sq mi)

Population (2020)
  - Total: 33,316
  - Density: 4,038/km^{2} (10,460/sq mi)
- Time zone: UTC+1 (CET)
  - Summer (DST): UTC+2 (CEST)
- ISO 3166 code: NO-030111
- Website: bydel-stovner.oslo.kommune.no

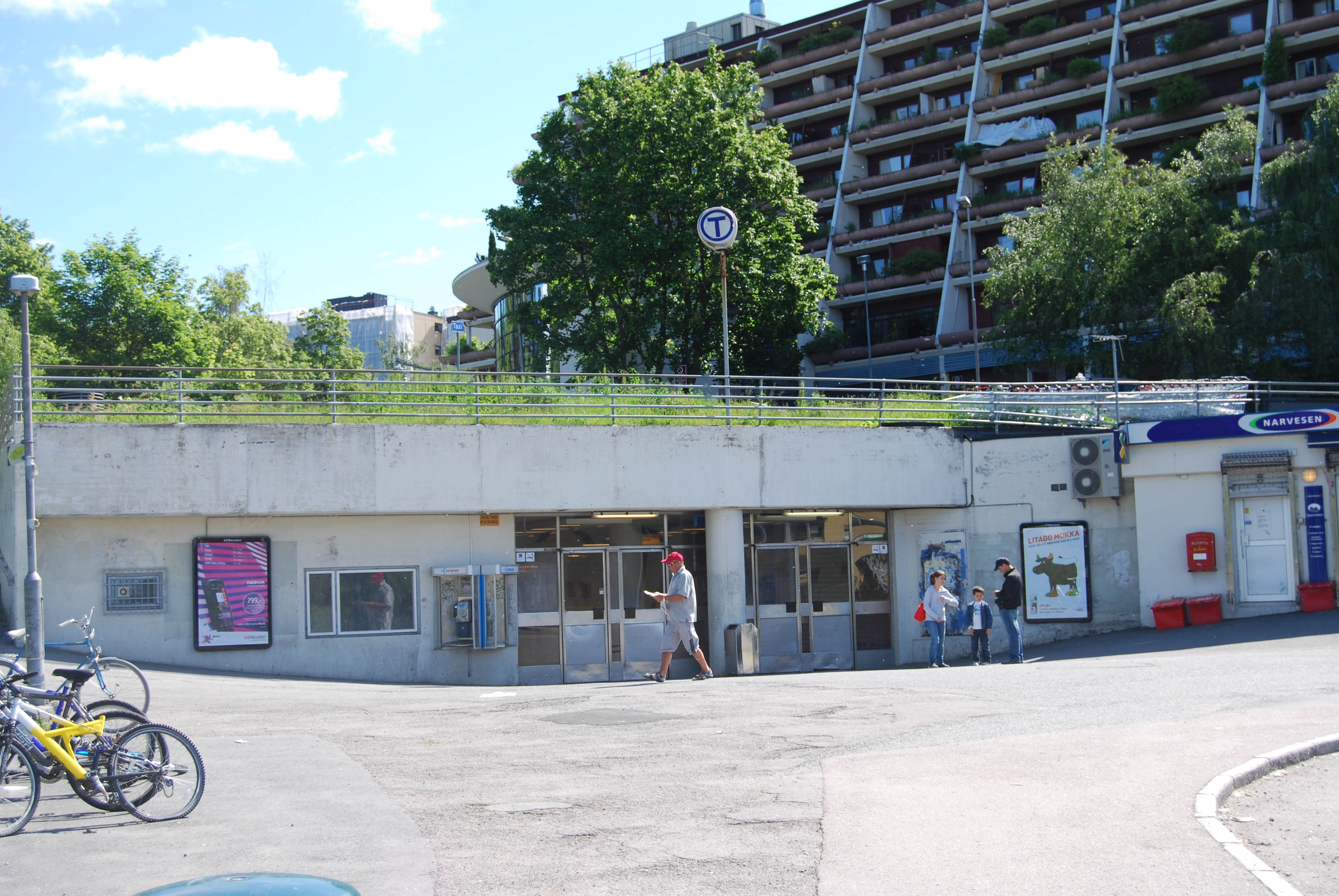
Stovner Station (T-bane)

Stovner (traditionally pronounced Stovner) is a borough located to the far north east of the city of Oslo, Norway.

Historically, Stovner was the name of a farm in the municipal borough "Østre Aker". Østre Aker merged with Oslo in 1948, both instigated and followed by a massive expansion of the city settlement. Today's Stovner borough is constructed atop the home fields of the Stovner farm, the first record of which dates back to the 14th century, as well as on the fields of several other farms that were situated in the area covered by the borough. The bulk of the modern high-rise structures were built by Selvaag and completed in the first half of the 1970s, together with several schools, a subway line into central Oslo, and an administrative center for the borough. The last three stations of Grorudbanen — Rommen, Stovner, and Vestli — are in the Stovner borough.

Stovner is the borough in Oslo and Norway with the highest density of immigrants. The proportion of newborns with an immigrant background was per. 2017 at 80%.

== Notable people ==
- Petter Skogsletten (born 1993), professional football coach
- Marian Abdi Hussein, a politician from the Socialist Left Party.
