= Grorud Line =

Metro line in Oslo, Norway

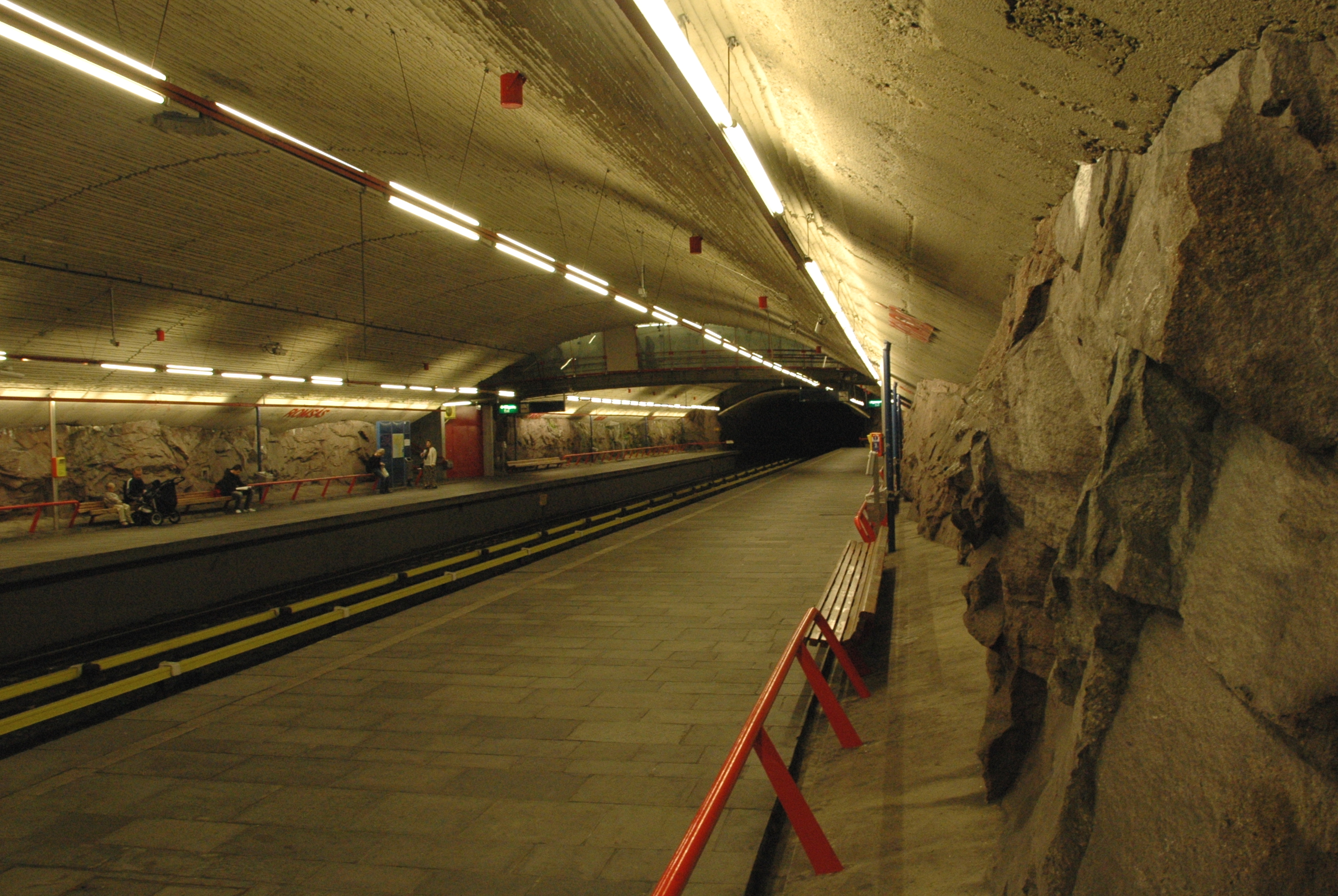
- Romsås Station

Overview
- Native name: Grorudbanen
- Owner: Sporveien
- Termini: Tøyen; Vestli
- Stations: 16

Service
- Type: Rapid transit
- System: Oslo Metro
- Operator: Sporveien T-banen
- Rolling stock: MX3000

History
- Opened: October 16, 1966

Technical
- Line length: 13.0 km (8.1 mi)
- Number of tracks: Double
- Track gauge: 1,435 mm (4 ft 8 1/2 in) standard gauge
- Electrification: 750 V DC third rail
- Operating speed: 70 km/h (43 mph)
- Highest elevation: 195.8 m (642 ft)

The Grorud Line (Norwegian: Grorudbanen) is a 13.0-kilometer-long (8.1 mi) line on the Oslo Metro between Tøyen and Vestli in Oslo, Norway. Built as a mix of underground, at ground level and as an elevated line, it runs through the northern part of Groruddalen, serving such neighborhoods as Grorud, Romsås and Stovner. Line 5 runs along the entire line four times per hour. Line 4 runs between Vestli and Økern before branching off on the Løren Line to get onto the Ring Line. With 40,000 daily riders, the Grorud Line is the busiest branch of the metro.

Proposals for an urban railway through the upper parts of Groruddalen were first articulated in public documents in 1919. Planning started in the late 1940s and the line was politically approved in 1954, along with three other metro lines and the Common Tunnel. Construction started in 1956 and was part of a process to transform Groruddalen into a residential area. The first part of the Grorud Line, from Tøyen to Grorud, was opened on 16 October 1966. The rest of the line opened in three stages: to Rommen on 3 March 1974, to Stovner on 18 August and to Vestli on 21 December 1975. The Ring Line connection opened on 22 August 2006 and on 3 April 2013 the Løren Line opened, connecting the Grorud Line to the Ring Line.

== Route ==
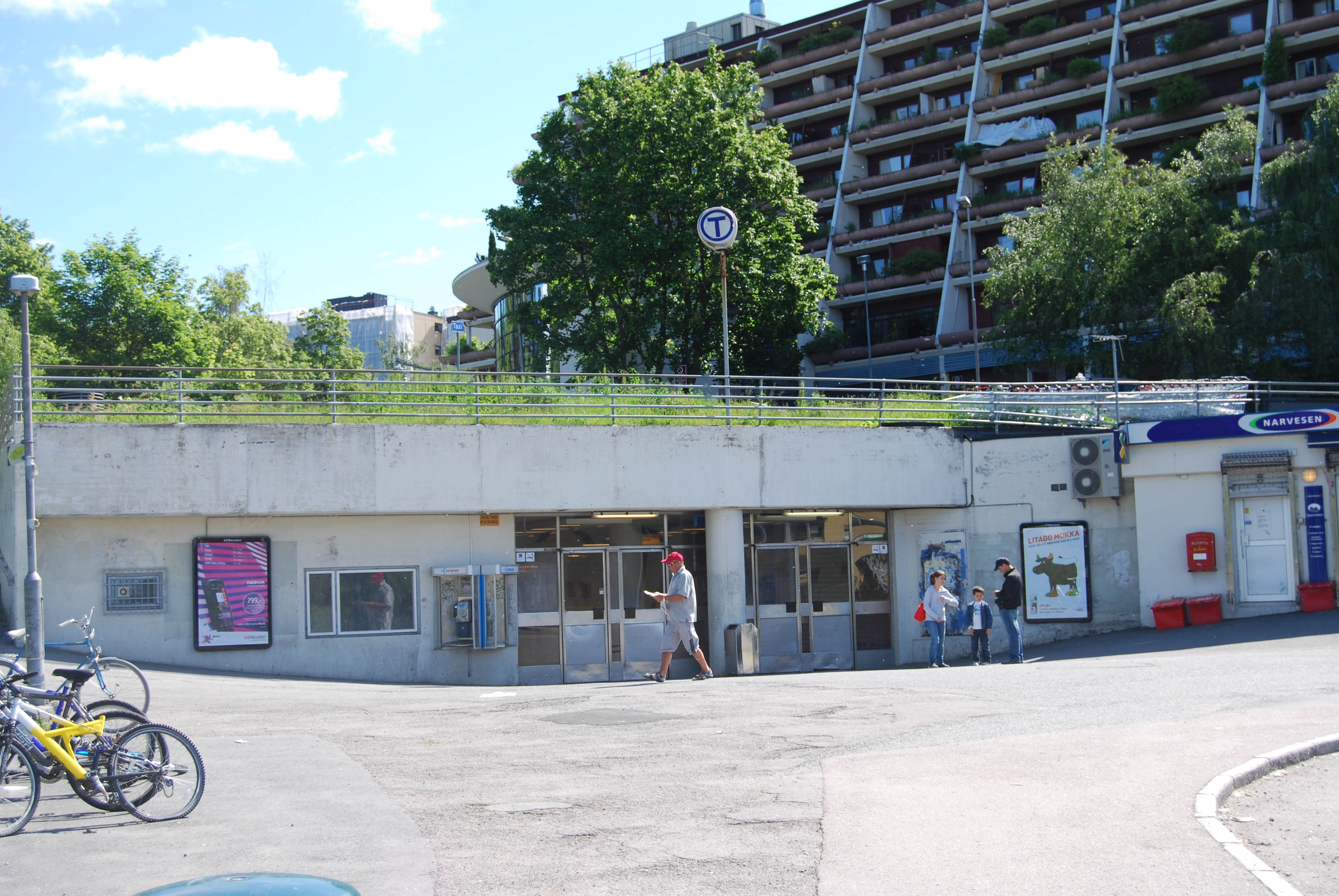
Entrance to Stovner

The Grorud Line is a 13.0 kilometers (8.1 mi) and runs through the northern side of Groruddalen in Oslo. Through the lower section of the line it passes through a mixed residential and commercial area. The Grorud Line branches from the Common Tunnel at Tøyen and continues in a tunnel to Carl Berners plass. At this point there is also a direct, single-track tunnel which allows non-revenue trains access to Ryen Depot. North of Carl Berners plass the Ring Line branches off from the Grorud Line. The latter continues in an S-curve to the neighborhood of Hasle, where it leaves the tunnel and reaches Hasle Station. It continues through a short tunnel under the Alna Line and Ring 3 before reaching Økern Station. Along this section the Løren Line connects to the Grorud Line.

The line continues past Risløkka Station parallel to Østre Aker vei. It continues past Vollebekk Station and Linderud, after which the character of the area changes to residential. The line crosses over to run parallel with National Road 4 from Veitvet Station. The line crosses under National Road 4 and continues past Rødtvet Station and Kalbakken Station. The line then enters a tunnel which it leaves before reaching Ammerud Station.

Next the line reaches Grorud Station and immediately afterwards enters a tunnel. Romsås Station is located within the tunnel, which ends just before reaching Rommen Station. The line continues at ground level until just before Stovner Station, at which time it enters a 1,340-meter (4,400 ft) tunnel. The line continues in this tunnel until reaching the terminus of Vestli Station.

== Service ==
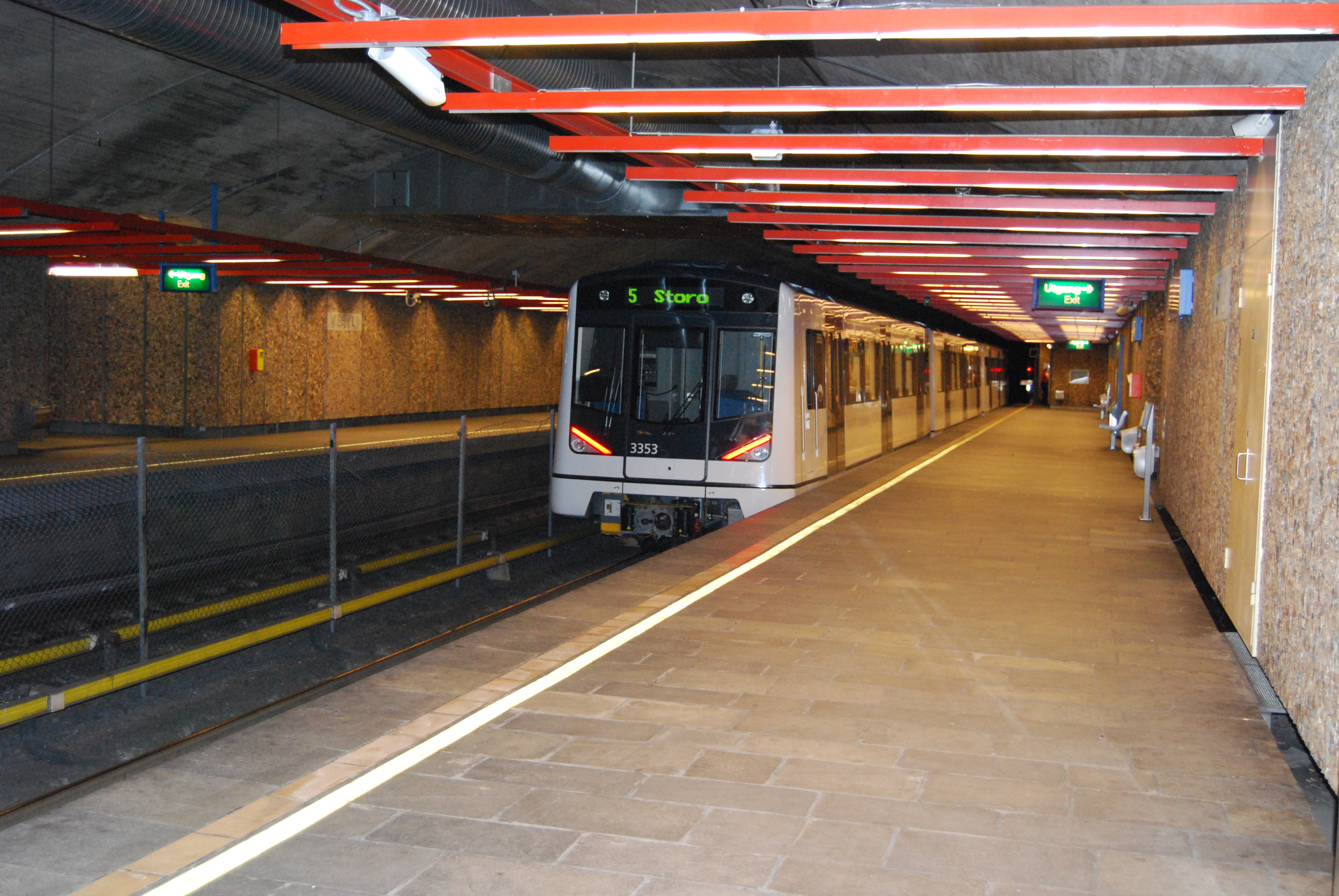
MX3000 train at Vestli

The Grorud line is served by lines 4 and 5 of the Oslo Metro, both lines running four times per hour. All have reduced services during late evenings and parts of the weekends. Line 5 runs the entire section of the Grorud Line, while line 4 runs between Vestli and Økern before branching off on the Løren Line and Ring Line. The two lines use the same amount of time to reach Majorstuen. For journeys to the central stations between Tøyen and Nationaltheateret, line 5 is quicker. For journeys to the stations between Blindern and Sinsen, line 4 is quicker.

Operations of the lines are done by Sporveien T-banen on contract with Ruter, the public transport authority in Oslo and Akershus. The infrastructure itself is owned by Sporveien, a municipal company. Service is provided using MX3000 three- and six-car trains. The line has 40,000 daily passengers, making it the busiest branch of the metro. Travel time along the line, from Tøyen to Vestli, is 23 minutes. Travel time from Vestli to Stortinget in the city center is 27 minutes. Transfer to Ruter buses are available at Tøyen, Carl Berners plass, Hasle, Økern, Linderud, Ammerud, Grorud and Stovner. Transfer to the Sinsen Line of the Oslo Tramway is available at Carl Berners plass.

== History ==
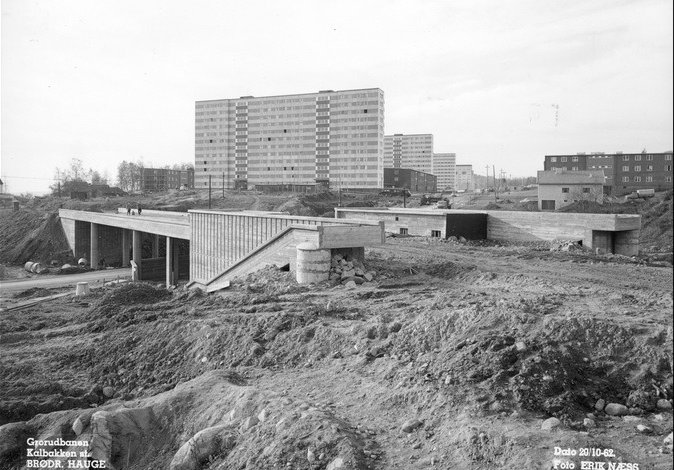
Kalbakken during construction in 1962

=== Planning ===
The first proposals for a line in the upper part of Groruddalen came as part of a 1917 competition issued by Christiana (later Oslo) and Aker Municipality to plan a new rail transport plan for the capital area. The winning design, made by Jørgen Barth, included a series of suburban lines, including one in the northern Groruddaen (contemporary known as Akerdalen). This resulted in a municipal urban rail plan that was passed in 1919. It proposed a somewhat different routing, with the Ring Line running via Grefsen and the Grorud Line running via Ensjø. Other lines were prioritized first, but from the mid 1930s lines through Groruddalen were again considered. A report was published in 1937, but all work was placed on hold following the German occupation of Norway in 1940.

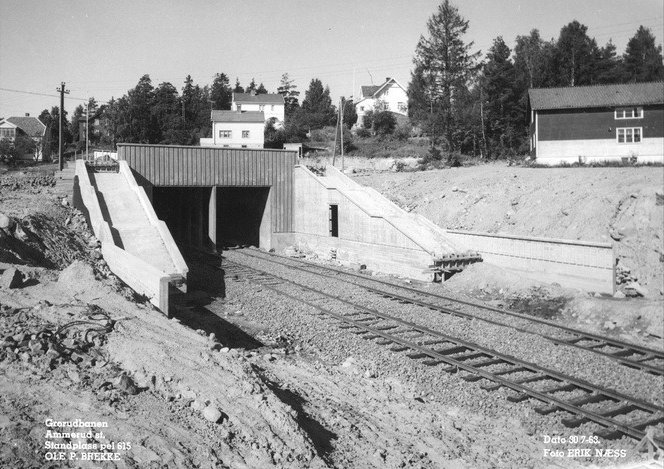
Construction of Ammerud Station in 1963

Work on the plans resumed in 1946. The new committee quickly concluded that an increase in the magnitude of the suburban lines was needed. An overground system was ruled out because of the increased estimates in traffic and an underground route was instead pursued. This part of the line would need to handle a traffic of 20,000 passengers per hour. At this time the Grorud Line was proposed as a branch of the Østensjø Line, which would divert at Etterstad. The municipalities of Oslo and Aker merged in 1948. Preliminary work on the line planning concluded in 1949 and instead a permanent municipal agency was established, the Planning Office For the Suburban and Underground Lines, on 15 September 1949. Instrumental in the change of magnitude was the change of was a shift in the zoning planning. There was a large housing shortage in Oslo and the region was experiencing rapid population growth. The solution was to build a series of commuter towns in Aker, which would be the basis for the traffic on the metro. Plans for both a metro and new housing were substantiated in a 1950 municipal plan.

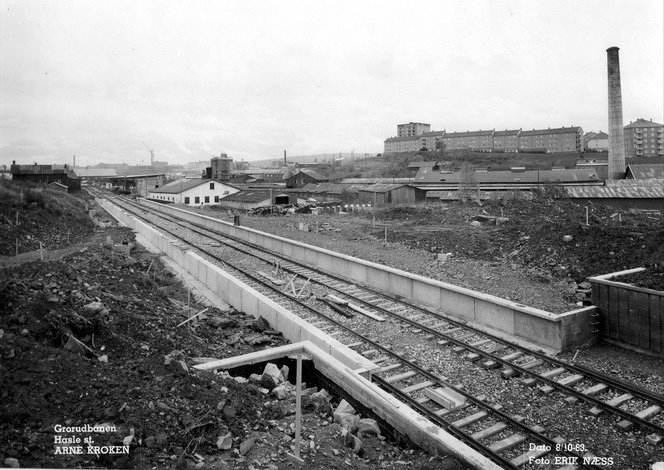
Building of Hasle Station in 1963

The basics for the metro were established in 1951, with a common segment through Enerhaugen with a terminus at Grønlands torg, to avoid having to cross Akerselva. The plans were made such that in the future the line could be extended to connect to Holmenkolbanen's western underground line at Nationalthatret. Four branches would be built, including the Grorud Line; the existing Østensjø Line would be converted to metro. The Lambertseter Line was politically approved on 3 April 1952 and the full four-line network was approved on 9 December 1954. The latter included moving the terminus to Jernbanetorget. Investments were estimated at 221 million Norwegian krone, including rolling stock.

=== Construction ===
Construction of the Grorud Line started in February 1956. Landwork and electrical equipment was contracted to developers, while the trackage was done by the Planning Office. The original plans called for the use of 600 to 650 volt (V) direct current (DC) fed via a pantograph, to allow comparability with the western light rail. This was later changed to 750 V DC via a third rail. This was chosen to allow a higher diameter, and thus a higher ampere, and easier maintenance. The system also took into use cab signaling and moving blocks, which were cutting edge technology at the time, and had only been implemented on the Stockholm Metro in Europe by then. While the permitted headway on the common sections was set to 90 seconds, it was set to 120 seconds on the Grorud Line. The original plans called for a depot on each of the lines, including the Grorud Line, but this was later changed to a central depot at Ryen. Stations were originally planned to be barrier-free and that the operator would employee conductors on board, similar to what was done of the tramway. This was however abandoned in 1958 and instead the stations were "closed" and ticket stands were installed at each station. The decision to allow Oslo Sporveier at the line's operator was taken in 1960.

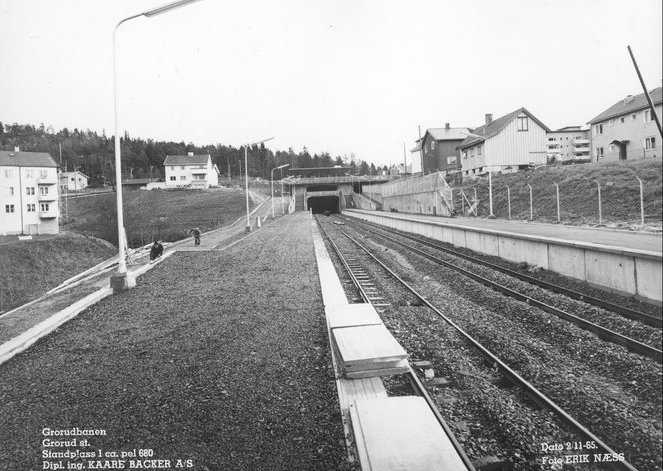
Construction of Grorud Station

The first parts of construction started in February 1956 at Rødtvet. Most of the earthwork was concluded by early 1964 on the 6.7 kilometers (4.2 mi) section from Hasle to Grorud. This included building a 37-million-kroner tunnel under Ring 3 and the Alna Line. The construction of the Grorud Line ran parallel with a large-scale residential construction along the line, especially on the upper sections. Commuter towns with a mix of row housing, condominiums and high-rises were built along the line, often concentrating close to the stations. Some also received small shopping centers.

The Grorud Line was originally planned as the inaugural part of the metro, as it was the line which would receive the most traffic. However, lack of sufficient personnel and technical difficulties caused a last-minute shift in these plans and instead the Lambertseter Line opened on 22 May 1966. Opening of the Grorud Line from Tøyen to Grorud was therefore delayed until 16 November 1966. The line took into use T1000 trains which could be up to six cars long. Originally the service terminated at Jernbanetorget in the city center, in addition to a service which ran via the branch from Carl Berners plass to the Lambertseter Line, and terminated at Ryen.

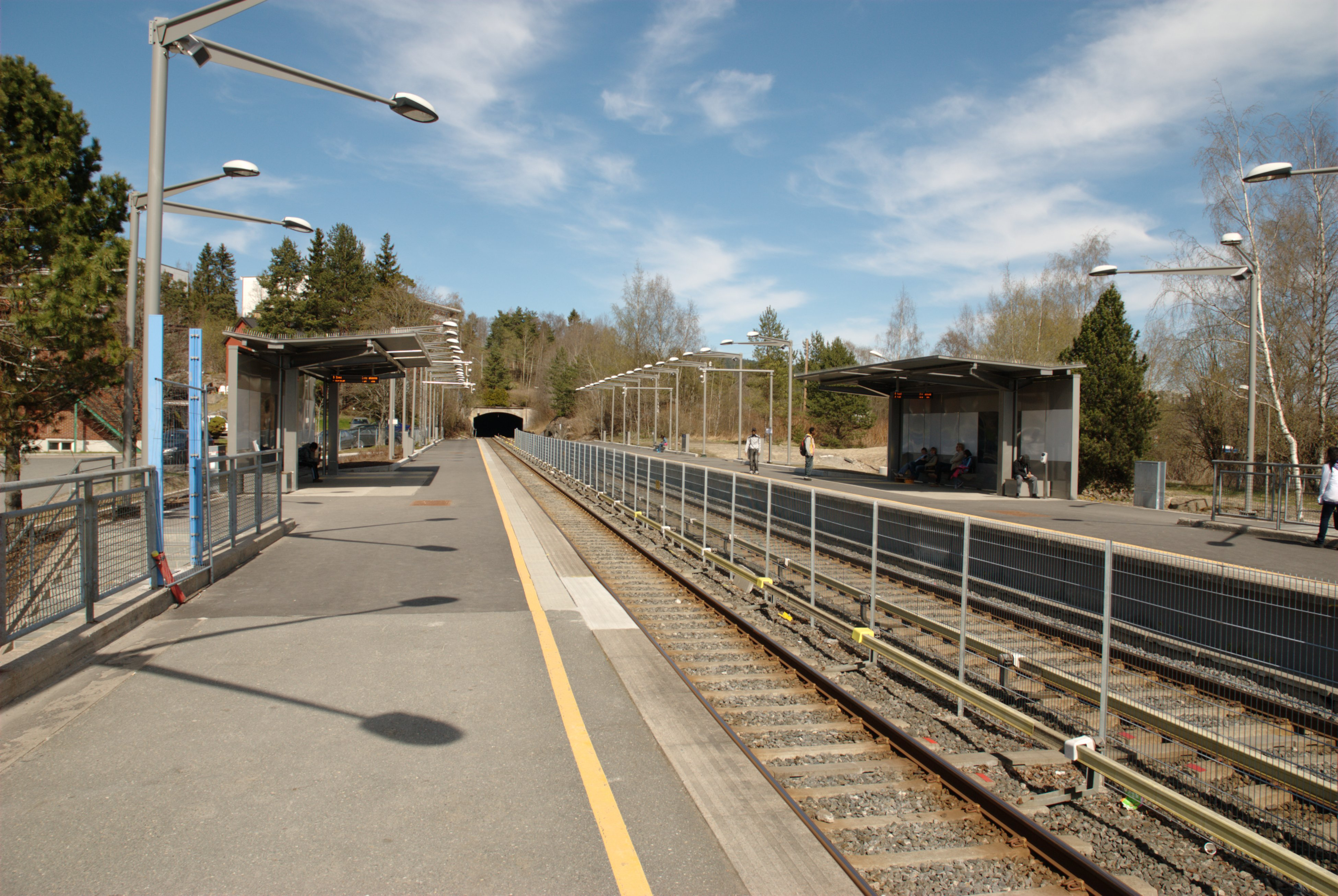
Kalbakken Station

The line was extended three during the 1970s, when new residential areas further northeast in the valley were completed. The first extension opened on 3 March 1974 from grorud to Rommen. Most of this ran through a tunnel, including Romsås Station. However, that station was not completed and for the expansion only Rommen was taken into use. The second extension took place on 18 August, with the tunnel from Rommen to Stovner. On the same date Romsås State opened. The final opening took place on 21 December 1975 when the tunnel past Stovener was extended to Vestli.

=== Operating history ===
On 9 January 1977, the city center service was extended to Sentrum. However, this station was closed from 20 March 1983 to 7 March 1987, and reopened as Stortinget. During the last years of the 1980s the barres and payment stalls were removed and replaced with a proof-of-payment system. This unstaffing of the station allowed for a significant cut in operating costs. From 8 April 1995, the trains on the Grorud Line continued all the way through the Common Tunnel to Blindern on the Sognsvann Line, which serves the main campus of the University of Oslo.

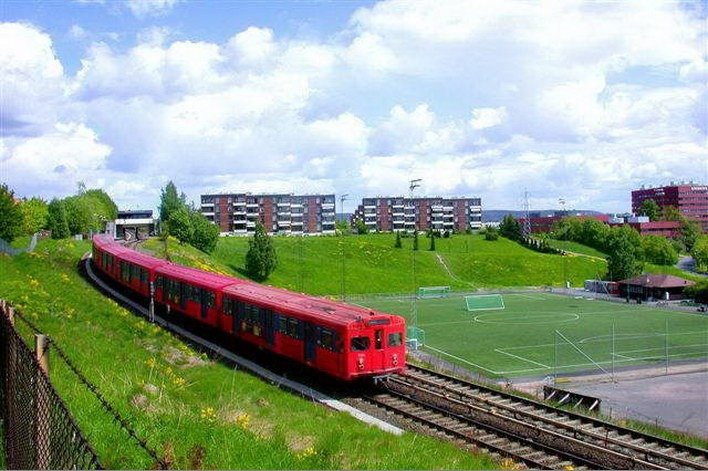
T1000 train passing through Vollebekk in 2000

Line 5 had its western terminus extended to Storo on 20 August 2003, when the first part of the Ring Line opened. In on 17 July 2004, during construction of the Ring Line, part of the tunnel collapsed, causing the Grorud Line to be closed for six months and 40,000 daily passengers had to be bussed around the accident site. The Ring Line was opened from Carl Berners plass to Sinsen on 22 August 2006, and the section from Tøyen to Carl Berners plass started being served by lines 4 and 6. The metro system started taking delivery of the new MX3000 units in 2007, which would replace the old stock. From 18 August 2008, the line's frequency on Line 5 was increased from four to eight trains per hour, although the extra trains terminate at Stortinget. By 2010, all T1000 stock had been retired. From 9 December 2012 the Grorud Line has been connected with the Røa Line in the west. Meanwhile, all services on Line 5 were extended to Røa instead of half terminating at Stortinget.

Construction of the 1.6 kilometers (0.99 mi) Løren Line began in June 2013. It was scheduled for completion in October 2015 and it was opened in 2016. As part of the project three stations, Romsås, Stovner and Vestli, were to receive upgrades. The work involved closing the Grorud Line's southern portion between September and December 2013. Financed through Oslo Package 3 and budgeted to cost 600 million krone, the project will include the new Løren Station. Line 3, which terminates at Storo will be extended to the Grorud Line. It will increase the east–west capacity through the metro system without having to expand the Common Tunnel.

== Future ==
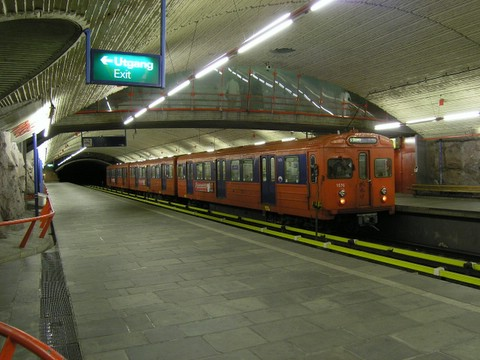
T1000 train at Romsås

Ruter has also proposed building a connection with the Furuset Line, between Furuset and Økern. Trains running on the line will connect to the Ring Line via the Løren Line. Other proposals involve extending the line to Slattum in Nittedal.

In the western end of the Grorudalen, a branch from Stovner has been proposed to connect to the Furuset Line. It would have new stations at Øvre Stovner, Lørenskog Station of the Trunk Line and the Oslo Commuter Rail, and Visperud. Visperud has also been proposed as a location for a park and ride for between 500 and 2,000 cars, as it is located on National Road 159 and European Route E6. Part of the rationale is to serve the new suburb of Skårerødgården, which is planned with 1,200 new houses, located within the catchment area of Lørenskog Station. The line would run entirely underground. The cost of building the 4.8 kilometers (3.0 mi) from Ellingsrudåsen to Stovner is estimated at NOK 2.4 billion.

Independent of the northern extension, is a branch from the Furuset Line to a point on the Grorud Line. The plan is to build a new line from Økern via Breivoll, where there would be an interchange with the Trunk Line, to Trosterud Station on the Furuset Line. Such a cross connection will allow both interconnection between the lower levels of the Grorud Line and the Furuset Line, and at the same time give access from the Furuset Line to the Ring Line. In addition to this, the plans call for a parallel line to the Furuset Line to run through the lower parts of Grurudalen, between the Furuset Line and the Trunk Line. This line could either connect to the Furuset Line at Furuset, or run across the valley, via Grorud Station on the Trunk Line, and connect to the Grorud Line at Rommen.
