= Petter Skogsletten =

Norwegian football coach

Personal information
- Date of birth: 10 March 1993 (age 33)
- Place of birth: Stovner, Norway
- Height: 1.80 m (5 ft 11 in)

Team information
- Current team: FC Roskilde

Managerial career
- Years: Team
- 2019 - 2021: FK Bodø/Glimt (Physical Performance Coach)
- 2021 - 2022: FC Nordsjælland (Physical Performance Coach)
- 2022 - 2023: Havnar Bóltfelag (Assistant Coach)
- 2023: FC Roskilde (Assistant Coach)

Petter Skogsletten (born 10 March 1993) is a Norwegian professional football coach. He now appears as the assistant coach of FC Roskilde, with the previously SC Heerenveen professional Jesper Håkansson as manager.

== Personal life ==
Skogsletten grew up in Stovner, a suburb of Oslo. He started his coaching career in the wake of a heart disease, which forced him out of playing. He early found a passion of coaching, and started his coaching career with the old top league club Lyn Fotball at the age of 16.

Skogsletten has later completed the famous "High Performance Football Coaching" studies in University of Lisbon. The studies were, among others, led by the well known José Mourinho.

== Club career ==
Petter Skogsletten has previously appeared in different professional clubs regarding Norway, Denmark and the Faroe Islands. He began as a physical performance coach for FK Bodø/Glimt during their famous period in between 2019 and 2021. The club had their best spell during these years, where they created the foundation of winning the Norwegian top league Eliteserien in 2021 and 2022, after being a runners up in 2019.

Skogsletten later went on to Denmark and FC Nordsjælland, working one and a half season as their physical performance coach.

During the summer of 2022, Petter Skogsletten decided to sign for the top league club Havnar Bóltfelag as their next assistant coach. The club, led by Dalibor Savic during their spell, ended up third in the Faroe Islands Premier League of 2022, and winning the national VFF Cup.

In the summer of 2023, Petter Skogsletten signed for the Danish club FC Roskilde, where he became the assistant manager of Jesper Håkansson.
