= Rommen (station) =

Oslo metro station

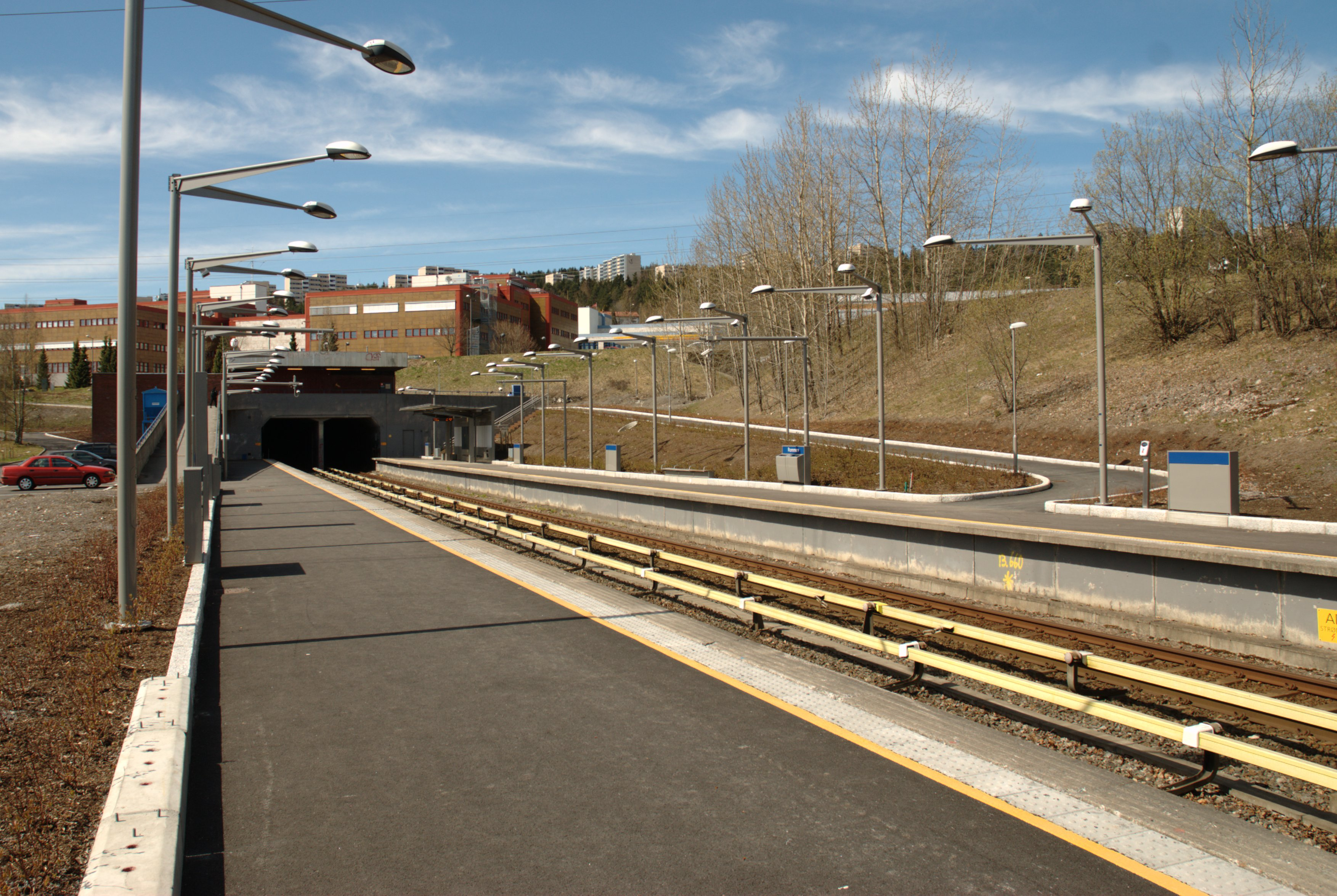

General information
- Location: Romsås, Oslo; Norway
- Coordinates: 59°57′41″N 10°54′28″E
- Owner: Sporveien
- Operator: Sporveien T-banen
- Line: Grorud Line
- Distance: 13.0 km (8.1 mi) from Stortinget
- Platforms: 2
- Tracks: 2

Construction
- Structure type: At-grade
- Accessible: Yes

History
- Opened: 13 March 1974
Location

Rommen is a Norwegian Oslo Metro station on Grorud Line between Romsås and Stovner, 13 km from Stortinget. It is located immediately east of the entrance to the tunnel which runs under the Romsås hill. The station was opened 13 March 1974 and was the end stop for the Grorud Line until it was extended to Stovner on 18 August the same year.

Rommen is located in a fairly industrial area, near industries such as the brush manufacturer Jordan AS. Also near the station is Grorud Fire Station.

Preceding station	Oslo Metro	Following station
Romsås towards Bergkrystallen	Line 4	Stovner towards Vestli
Romsås towards Ring Line and Sognsvann	Line 5	Stovner towards Vestli
