= Oslo Package 3 =

Norwegian transport investment plan

Oslo Package 3 is a political agreement and plan for investments of 53 billion kr in Oslo and Akershus, Norway. It involves financing for road and public transport infrastructure, as well as operating subsidies to public transport in the period 2008–27. It will be part of the National Transport Plan 2010–19. In addition to state grant, the main financing will be through toll ring around Oslo. The plan is a follow-up on its predecessors, the Oslo Package 1 and Oslo Package 2.

== Public transport projects ==
- Upgrade of the Common Tunnel of the Oslo Metro
- New Homansbyen Station on the metro
- Building of Hasle Line and Løren Station on the metro
- 189 new MX3000 electric multiple units for the metro
- Extension of the Furuset Line to Akershus University Hospital
- Extension of the Ekeberg Line to Hauketo

== Highway projects ==
- Norwegian National Road 168 Røa Tunnel
- Norwegian National Road 4 Bjørvika–Økern
- Norwegian National Road 4, Fossum Diagonal
- Norwegian National Road 150 Nydal Junction
- European Route E18, Asker–Skøyen
- European Route E6, Manglerud Tunnel
- European Route E18, Mossevei Tunnel

== Environmental impact ==
Although Oslo Package 3 has been presented as an environmental project that will save the public transport in the Oslo area, doubt has been raised as to the actual impact of the project. In a report ordered by the Norwegian Society of Chartered Scientific and Academic Professionals by the consulting company Civitas that the emission of greenhouse gases will increase with 50% in the period 1991–2025 with Oslo Package 3, despite the Oslo City Council having voted to reduce emissions with 50% from 1990-level by 2030.
