= Vestli station =

Oslo metro station

Vestli
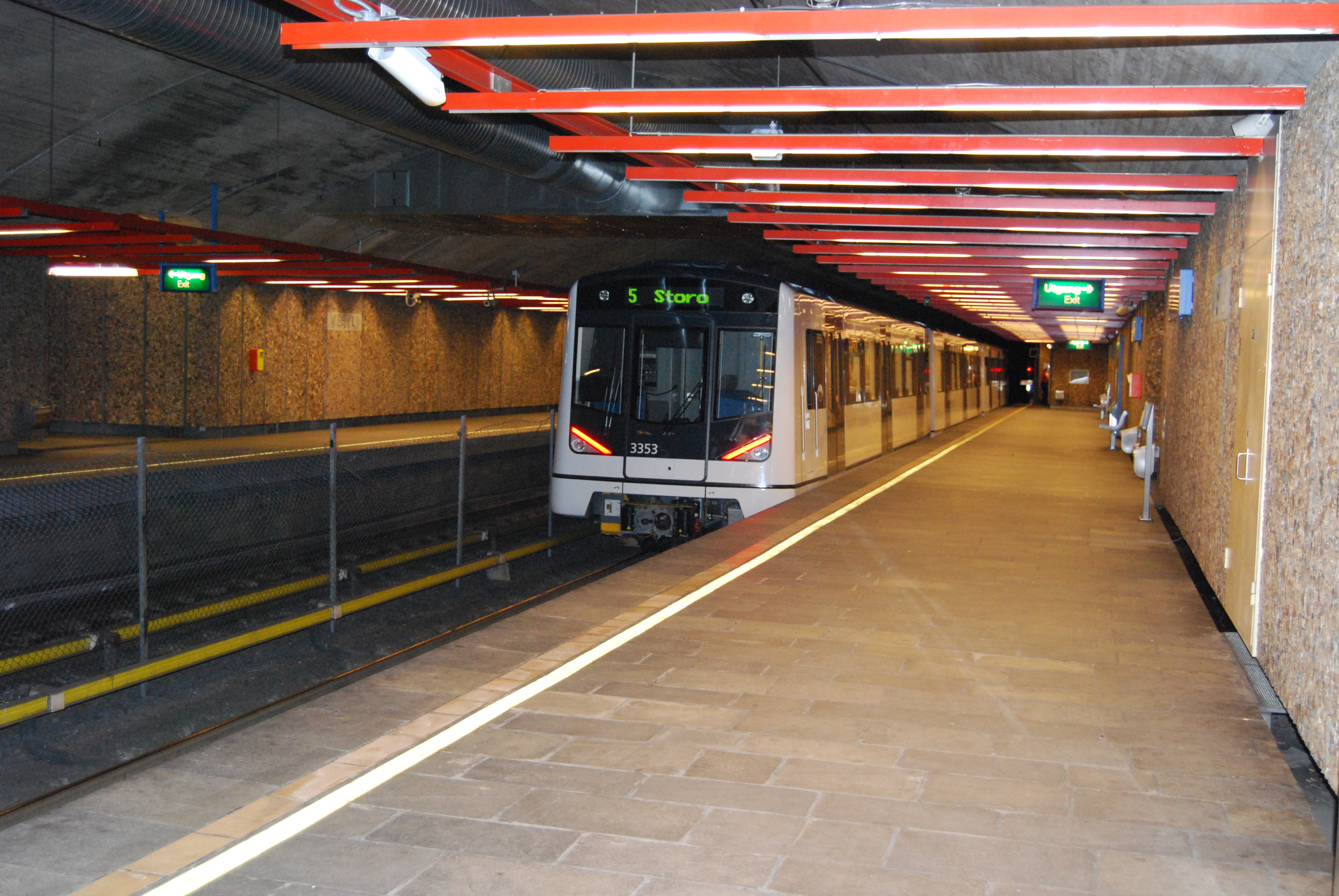

General information
- Location: Vestli, Oslo; Norway
- Coordinates: 59°58′19″N 10°55′42″E
- Elevation: 195.8 m (642 ft)
- Owner: Sporveien
- Operator: Sporveien T-banen
- Line: Grorud Line
- Distance: 15.1 km (9.4 mi) from Stortinget

Construction
- Structure type: Underground
- Accessible: Yes

History
- Opened: 21 December 1975
Location

Vestli is a subway station on Grorud Line of the Oslo Metro. It is the start/end station on the line. It comes after Stovner. The station is located in the Stovner borough. The station opened on 21 December 1975. The station has a small depot for subway carriages beyond the platforms.

The area around Vestli, the northernmost neighborhood of Stovner, is residential. Like the station at Stovner, Vestli is located beneath some shops, though not as large as the shopping centre at Stovner.

Preceding station	Oslo Metro	Following station
Stovner towards Bergkrystallen	Line 4	Terminus
Stovner towards Ring Line and Sognsvann	Line 5	Terminus
