= Sporveien T-banen =

Norwegian transport company

Sporveien T-banen AS
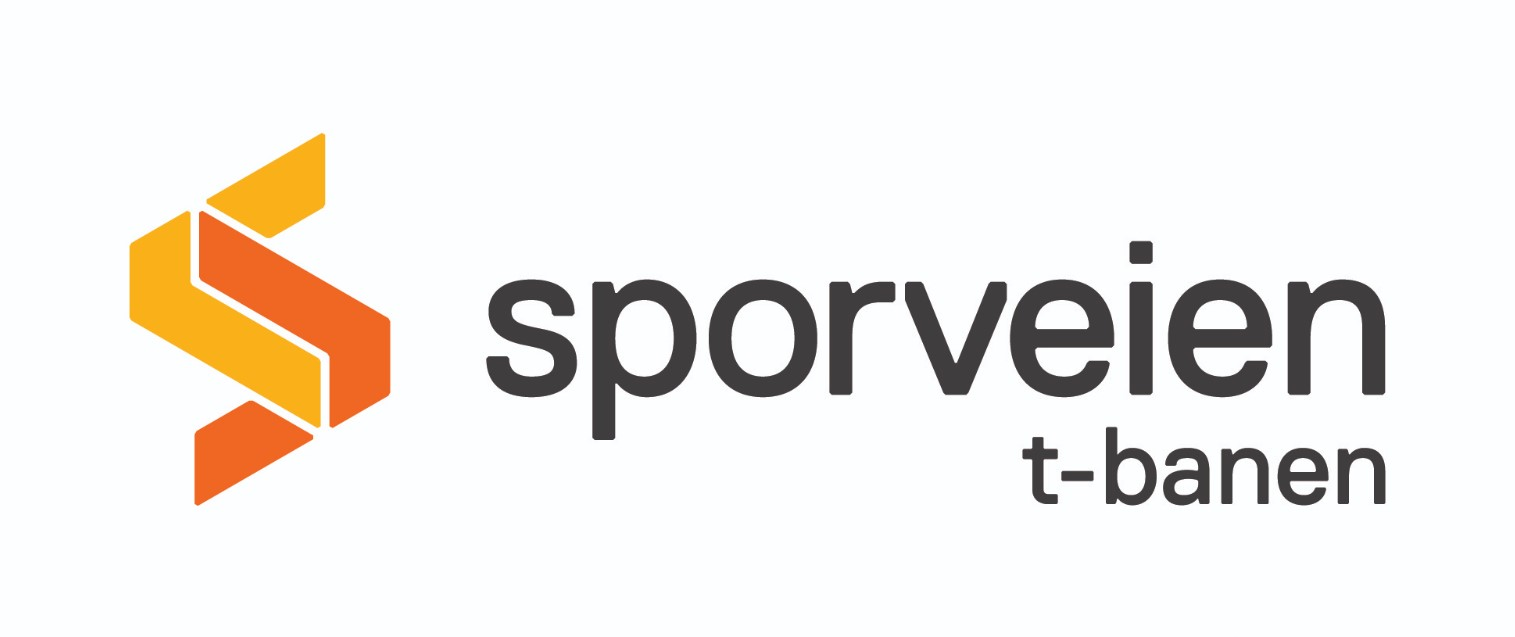
- Company type: Subsidiary
- Industry: Transport
- Headquarters: Oslo, Norway
- Area served: Greater Oslo
- Key people: Per Magne Mathisen (CEO)
- Net income: 52,120,000 Norwegian krone (2018)
- Number of employees: 594 (2022)
- Parent: Sporveien
- Website: www.tbanen.no

Sporveien T-banen AS is a limited company that is responsible for operating Oslo Metro (Norwegian: Oslo T-bane), the rapid transit in Oslo, Norway. The company is owned by Sporveien, which is owned by the municipal Oslo. Sporveien operates on a contract with Ruter, the public transport administration in Oslo and Akershus.

The company has 594 employees, and operates 115 metro cars. A total of 101 million passengers used the rapid transit in Oslo in 2022.
