= Berg metro station =

Oslo metro station

Berg
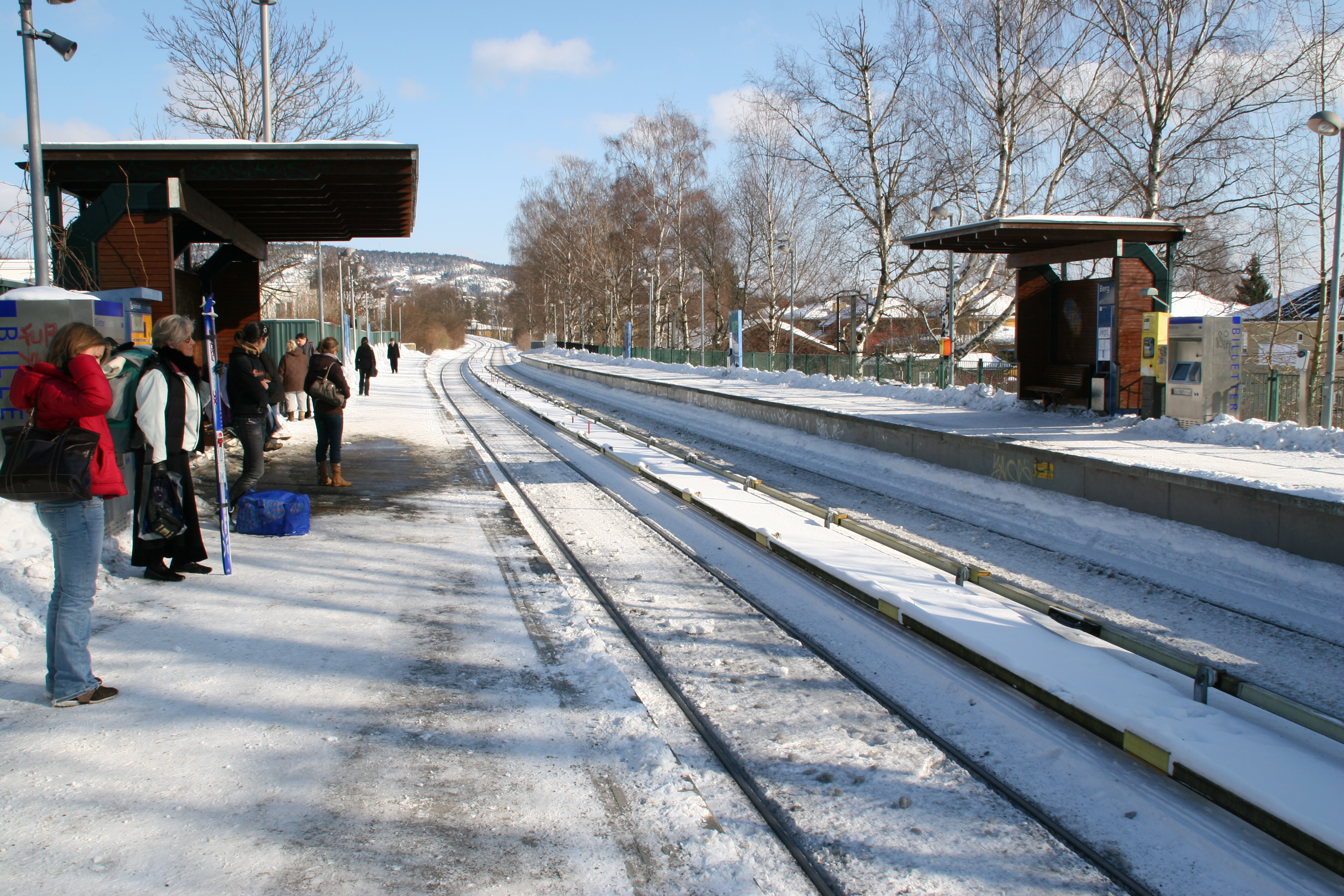
- Berg station on a wintery day

General information
- Location: Berg, Oslo; Norway
- Coordinates: 59°57′2″N 10°44′42″E
- Owner: Sporveien
- Operator: Sporveien T-banen
- Line: Sognsvann Line
- Distance: 6.1 km (3.8 mi) from Stortinget
- Connections: Bus: 23 Lysaker – Simensbråten; 24 Fornebu – Brynseng

Construction
- Structure type: At-grade
- Accessible: Yes

History
- Opened: 10 October 1934

Services
Preceding station	Oslo Metro	Following station
Tåsen towards Sognsvann	Line 5	Ullevål stadion towards Ring Line and Vestli
Location

Berg is a station on the Sognsvann Line (line 6) of the Oslo Metro in Norway. Located between Ullevål stadion and Tåsen stations, it is the first station after the Ring Line leaves the Sognsvann Line. The station is located 6.1 kilometres (3.8 mi) from Stortinget station. Berg is amongst the original stations on the line, and was opened on 10 October 1934. It was upgraded and rebuilt in the 1990s, when the Sognsvann Line was upgraded from light rail to rapid transit standard. Three accidents have taken place at Berg station, the latest in 2008. The area around the station is mainly residential. Berg Upper Secondary School is located approximately 100 metres (330 ft) from the station.

== History ==
Berg station was opened on 10 October 1934, when the municipally owned company Akersbanerne had completed the Sognsvann Line from Majorstuen to Sognsvann. Residential areas at Sogn, Tåsen and Berg were starting to grow, in pace with a larger suburban development plan. Akersbanerne bought new property along the line, upon which new houses were to be designed by the Norwegian architect Kristofer Lange (1886–1977).

The line was originally double-tracked from Majorstuen to Korsvoll (now Østhorn) station and single-tracked from Korsvoll to Sognsvann. On 21 February 1939, the section from Korsvoll to Sognsvann was upgraded to double tracks, and Korsvoll station had its name changed to Østhorn.

In the 1980s, the stations on the Sognsvann Line were rebuilt. The platforms were lengthened from fitting two-car to fitting four-car trains and the platform height was increased. The third rail made it impossible to cross the line at-grade; a new path to an existing road underpass was therefore created. The station was also redesigned in concrete with steel columns and wooden sheds designed by architect Arne Henriksen.

In 1991, Oslo Sporveier presented plans involving a rapid transit circle line in Oslo, connecting the newly built hospital Rikshospitalet with the rest of the city. A detailed suggestion was presented by Oslo Sporveier in August 1996. In the local newspaper Aftenposten Aften there was a debate on whether there should be a ring line from Berg along the National Road 150 towards Gaustad over Rikshospitalet, or whether the Ullevål Hageby Line should be extended from John Colletts plass to Rikshospitalet, thereby creating a correspondence with the Sognsvann Line at the new station Forskningsparken. In the first plans, Berg was meant to be a station on the new ring line. This plan was discarded since local residents feared noise pollution and destroyed lawns. Even though Berg was not made a station on the Ring Line, noise shields were put up along the Sognsvann Line.

Berg station has seen many accidents and almost-accidents. In 1965, a deadly accident occurred between Ullevål and Berg stations, when a train ran over a 33-year-old man walking in the tracks. In 2002, a 24-year-old man was run over by a metro train approaching the station. The man survived the accident with minor wounds. In 2008, a 21-year-old drunk man was found crawling around on the tracks between the platforms. The police removed him from the station and sent him home in a taxi.

== Service ==
Berg is served by line 5 on the Sognsvann Line, operated by Oslo T-banedrift on contract with Ruter. The rapid transit serves the station every 15 minutes, except in the late evening and on weekend mornings, when there is a 30-minute headway. Travel time along the 6.1-kilometre (3.8 mi) portion to Stortinget in the city center is 11 minutes.

The station provides correspondence to the bus lines 23 and 24 at a nearby bus stop in Kaj Munks vei.

== Facilities ==
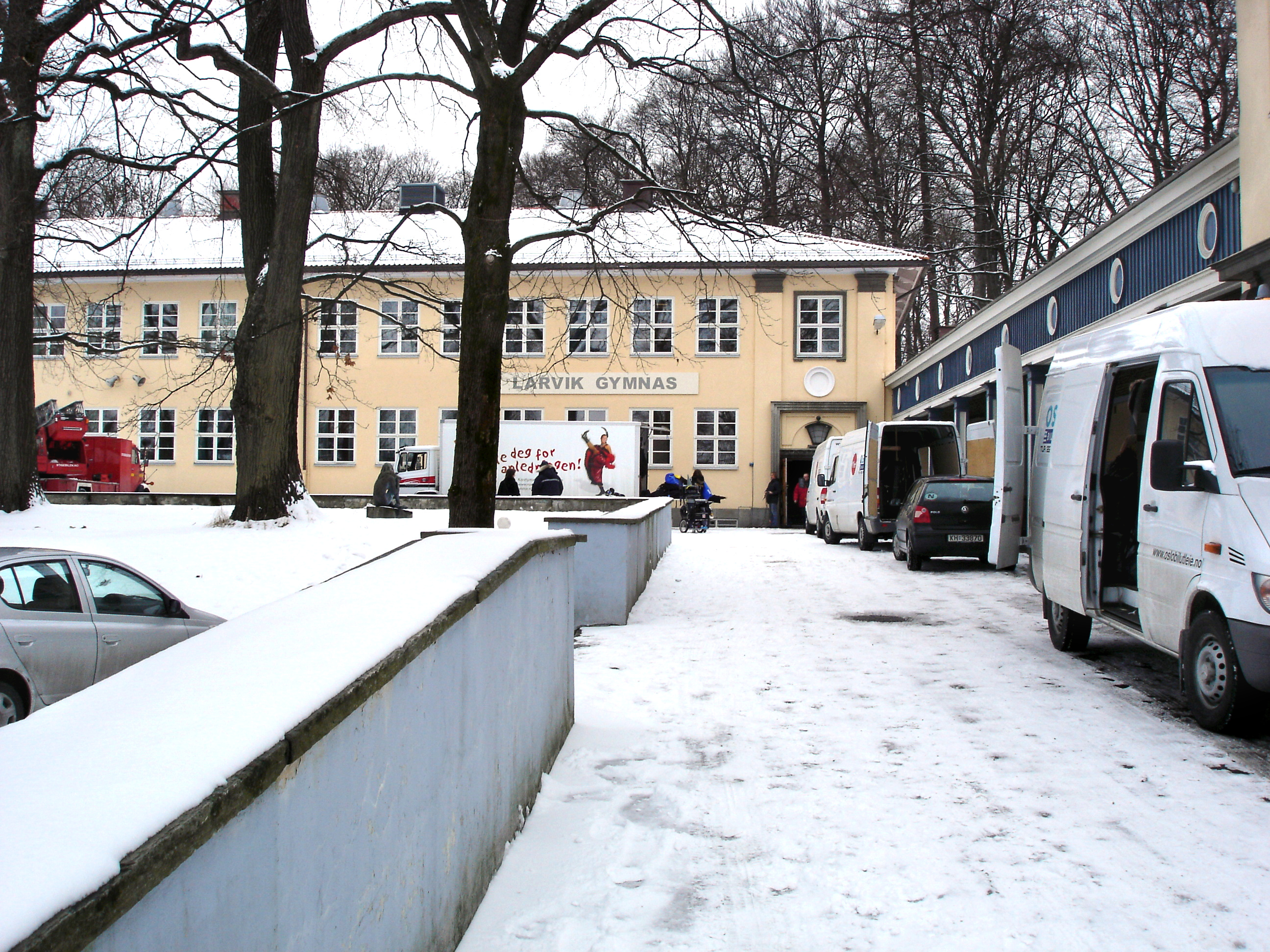
Berg Upper Secondary School

Berg has two platforms, each with a wooden shed and ticket machines. The sheds are designed by Arne Henriksen in a minimalistic and standardised style with constructions of wood and steel.

=== Location ===
Berg is located in the borough of Nordre Aker, northeast of the residential area Ullevål Hageby, northwest of Voldsløkka, west of Tåsen, south of Nordberg and east of Sogn. The area Berg is named after an old farm from 1264 with the same name. The street John Colletts allé, starting from John Colletts plass in Ullevål Hageby, ends at Berg station. Kaj Munks vei, as part of the Norwegian National Road 150, runs parallel with the line from Ullevål stadion via Berg to Tåsen, and continues thereafter towards Nydalen. There are many Swiss chalet and functionalist style houses in the residential area around the station. Berg Upper Secondary School is located 100 metres (330 ft) from the station.
