= Nordre Aker =

Borough of Oslo, Norway

Bydel Nordre Aker
- Borough
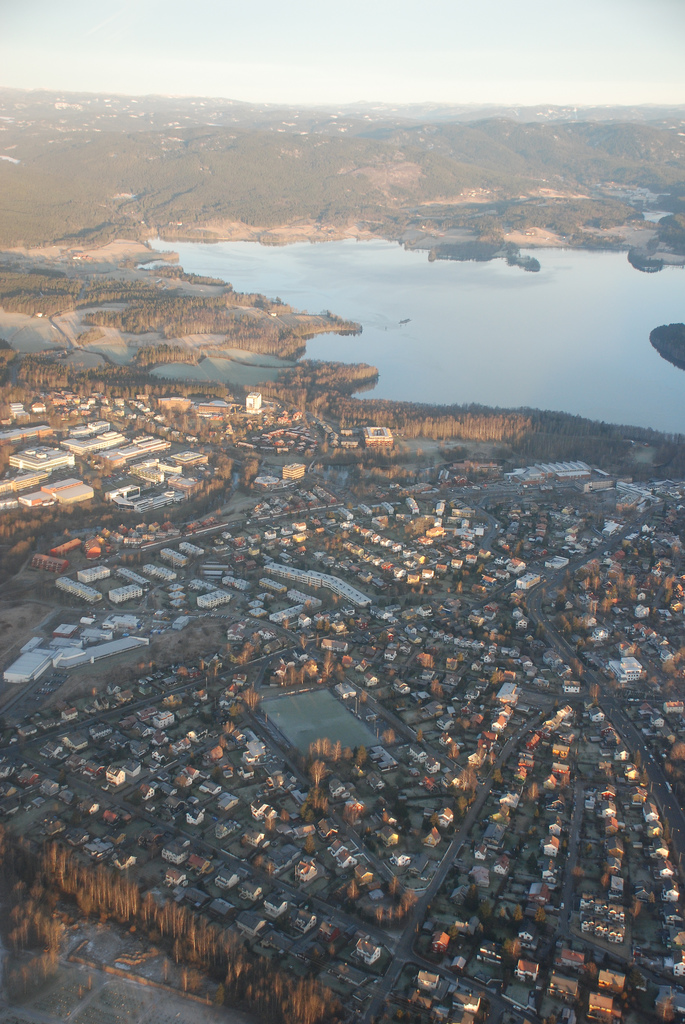

- Coat of arms

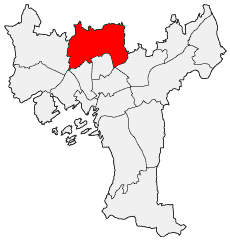
- Country: Norway
- City: Oslo

Area
  - Total: 13.57 km^{2} (5.24 sq mi)

Population (2020)
  - Total: 52,327
  - Density: 3,856/km^{2} (9,990/sq mi)
- Time zone: UTC+1 (CET)
  - Summer (DST): UTC+2 (CEST)
- ISO 3166 code: NO-030108
- Website: bydel-nordre-aker.oslo.kommune.no

Nordre Aker (Northern Aker) is a borough of the city of Oslo, Norway.

== History ==
This area became part of the city of Oslo in 1948. Before that it was a part of the former Aker municipality in Akershus county.

== Demographics and housing ==
With a population of 52,327 (1 January 2020) Nordre Aker ranks fifth among the boroughs.

Detached housing dominates the western part of the borough. There are also high-rise student blocks at several locations, including Vestgrensa, Sogn, Fjellbirkeland and Kringsjå.

== Geography ==
The borough is north of the city centre, and represents the last major settlement before the northern forested area starts. It is bordered by Marka in the north and east, Vestre Aker in the west, Frogner in the southwest, St. Hanshaugen, Sagene and a small part of Grünerløkka in the south and Bjerke in the east.

The borough consists of several neighborhoods, from west to east: Gaustad, Øvre Blindern, Ullevål Hageby, Sogn, Kringsjå, Nordberg, Korsvoll, Tåsen, Ullevål, Berg, Nydalen, Storo, Frysja, Disen, Kjelsås, Grefsen and Nordre Åsen.

The major body of water in the borough is the river Akerselva. The western border of the borough is formed by a creek, Sognsvannsbekken. The lake Sognsvann is not located in Nordre Aker, albeit the parking lot and metro leading to it is.

== Transportation ==
The area is well covered with public transportation. Part of the Sognsvann Line of the Oslo Metro is in Nordre Aker, exactly beginning at the station Blindern in the south to the terminus Sognsvann in the north. The line runs northeast from Blindern, but between Berg and Tåsen it turns to the northwest and north. At the station Forskningsparken the Sognsvann Line overpasses the light rail Ullevål Hageby Line, which comes from the southeast. The terminus of this line being John Colletts plass for many years, it was extended to Rikshospitalet in 1999.

Branching off from the Sognsvann Line between Ullevål stadion and Berg since 2006 is the Ring Line of the Metro. The Ring Line stops at Nydalen before heading southwards and converging with the borough border towards St. Hanshaugen. The station Storo is on the border between the boroughs. Storo is also a light rail station; the terminus of the Grünerløkka–Torshov Line and the start of the Kjelsås Line. Opened in 1934, the Kjelsås Line runs northwards towards the terminus at Kjelsås. Lastly, Kjelsås is also a station on the Gjøvik Line railway, so is Nydalen. The Gjøvik Line runs from Storo via Akerselva towards Kjelsås, and northwards into Marka.

Road transport is also important in the borough. The largest ring road in the city, Ring 3, cuts through Nordre Aker. The portion of Ring 3 located in Nordre Aker starts, in the west, exactly at the underpass of Gaustadalléen under Ring 3 (at Gaustadalléen station), and ends in the east at the Sinsen Interchange. It runs eastward until after Nydalen, when it turns steeply to the south. The road it crosses at the Sinsen Interchange is not located in Nordre Aker.

== Culture ==
The local newspaper is Nordre Aker Budstikke. It is distributed freely and weekly. Also, student newspapers such as Universitas are headquartered in the borough; Universitas is also distributed to institutions in other boroughs.

=== Sports ===
Nordre Aker is best known as the site of Ullevål Stadion, the stadium of the Norway national football team. Tenants on club level have been Vålerenga Fotball, and FK Lyn before the latter club faced a series of relegations. Vålerenga originally has no connection to Nordre Aker, whereas Lyn origins from the north of the borough, around Kringsjå. Ullevål is traditionally the area of Ullevål IL, and though this club has dropped association football from its programme, it operates the bandy field Bergbanen adjacent to Ullevål Stadion. Other bandy clubs in the borough are Tåsen IL and Skeid Bandy. Skeid Bandy, a part of the multi-sports-club Skeid, has a headquarters at Nordre Åsen, but the club has a geographic connection to Sagene borough. Lyn is also a multi-sports club, SFK Lyn, which in addition to football is involved in Nordic skiing. Other skiing clubs in the borough are IL Koll (which also professes in volleyball), Kjelsås IL (which also professes in football) and Nydalen SK (which also professes in orienteering). Korsvoll IL is best known for football and handball. IK Akerselva is a floorball club competing on the highest national level.

In addition, the students' sports club Oslostudentenes IK (OSI) has a connection to Nordre Aker, as it uses the indoor arena Domus Athletica in Ullevål Hageby, although the club originated in Sentrum in the milieu of the old university campus. Domus Athletica is owned by, and houses the headquarters of, the Foundation for Student Life in Oslo.

Track and field athletics is weak as far as clubs go; Koll, OSI, Lyn and Kjelsås are minor clubs. On the other hand, the Norwegian School of Sport Sciences (see also Education) includes a multi-use indoor arena as well as a red rubber track, tennis fields, ice sports fields, football fields, a bobsleigh training track and more. The facilities at the School of Sports Sciences are used by national and international sportspeople, much because the national Olympic training scheme, Olympiatoppen and the elite sports centre, Toppidrettssenteret are located north of the School of Sports Sciences.

Federations such as the Norwegian Olympic and Paralympic Committee and Confederation of Sports, the Football Association of Norway and the Norwegian Athletics Association are headquartered in Idrettens Hus at Ullevål Stadion.

== Churches and hospitals ==
The "National Hospital" of Norway, Rikshospitalet, was moved to Gaustad in 2000. Its location is west across the street of Gaustad Hospital, founded in 1855. Gaustad was originally chosen as a location because of the rural seclusion of the time. Inhabitants in the east of Nordre Aker live closer to Aker Hospital, but this hospital is located slightly outside the borough.

In the Church of Norway, Nordre Aker is a deanery whose borders does not correspond with the borough border (they are more widespread). The parishes in the deanery are Torshov, Tonsen, Sofienberg, Paulus, Lilleborg, Sagene, Iladalen and Grefsen.

== Education and business ==
Nordre Aker is the center of higher education in Oslo and therefore Norway, with the main campus of the University of Oslo located at Blindern since the post-war years. In addition, there is a campus for medicine and odontology at Rikshospitalet, and buildings belonging to the university in Forskningsparken ("the Research Park") northwest of Blindern. In addition, the Norwegian School of Management is headquartered in Nydalen since 2005. Near Sognsvann, the Norwegian School of Sport Sciences is located. A newer institution of higher education is the Norwegian College of Acupuncture. Other institutions in the area include the Norwegian Meteorological Institute and the National Archives of Norway.

Upper secondary schools in the borough are Blindern and Nydalen. One folk high school, Rønningen Folk High School, is located in the extreme northeast of the borough.

Forskningsparken contains several research-based businesses, but these are located outside of the borough. Major commercial buildings include Sogn Arena, owned by Bertel O. Steen Eiendom. Major shopping malls in the vicinity are Ullevål Stadion Shopping, Tåsen Senter and Storo Storsenter.

== Politics ==
As a borough of Oslo, Nordre Aker is governed by the city council of Oslo (in a parliamentary system) as well as its own borough council. The borough council leader is Bent Gether-Rønning from the Conservative Party, and the deputy leader is Erik Borge Skei of the Liberal Party. The 15 seats are distributed among the following political parties:

- 1 from the Socialist Left Party (Sosialistisk Folkeparti)
- 5 from the Labour Party (Arbeiderpartiet)
- 2 from the Liberal Party (Venstre)
- 6 from the Conservative Party (Høyre)
- 1 from the Progress Party (Fremskrittspartiet)
