= Tåsen accident =

1992 railway incident in Oslo, Norway

Coordinates: 59°57′12″N 10°45′09″E

Details
- Date: February 24, 1992; 12:55 p.m. EDT (06:55 UTC +1)
- Location: Between Tåsen and Østhorn stations at Nordberg, Oslo
- Country: Norway
- Line: Sognsvann Line
- Operator: Oslo Sporveier
- Incident type: Collision between passenger train and excavator

Statistics
- Trains: One T1300 train and one excavator
- Deaths: 1
- Injured: 10

The Tåsen accident was a collision between a T1300 train and an excavator on the Sognsvann Line of the Oslo Metro in Oslo, Norway. The accident happened February 24, 1992 just north of Tåsen Station.

== Accident ==
At 12:55 p.m. EDT (06:55 UTC) on Monday, On February 24, 1992, a double-wagoned T1300 train of the 8 series, bound from Stortinget on line no. 13 for Sognsvann left Tåsen Station. A few seconds later, in the same minute, it crashed into an excavator that was performing maintenance work on the line, just after having gained speed. The excavator's tilting bucket smashed into the front window of the first wagon and destroyed the whole front part of the train.

A 26-year-old woman sat with her 6-year-old daughter in the front of the train when the bucket hit the train's left part. She died after a few seconds, while her child was seriously wounded, and sent to Ullevål University Hospital.
