= Tåsen (station) =

Oslo metro station

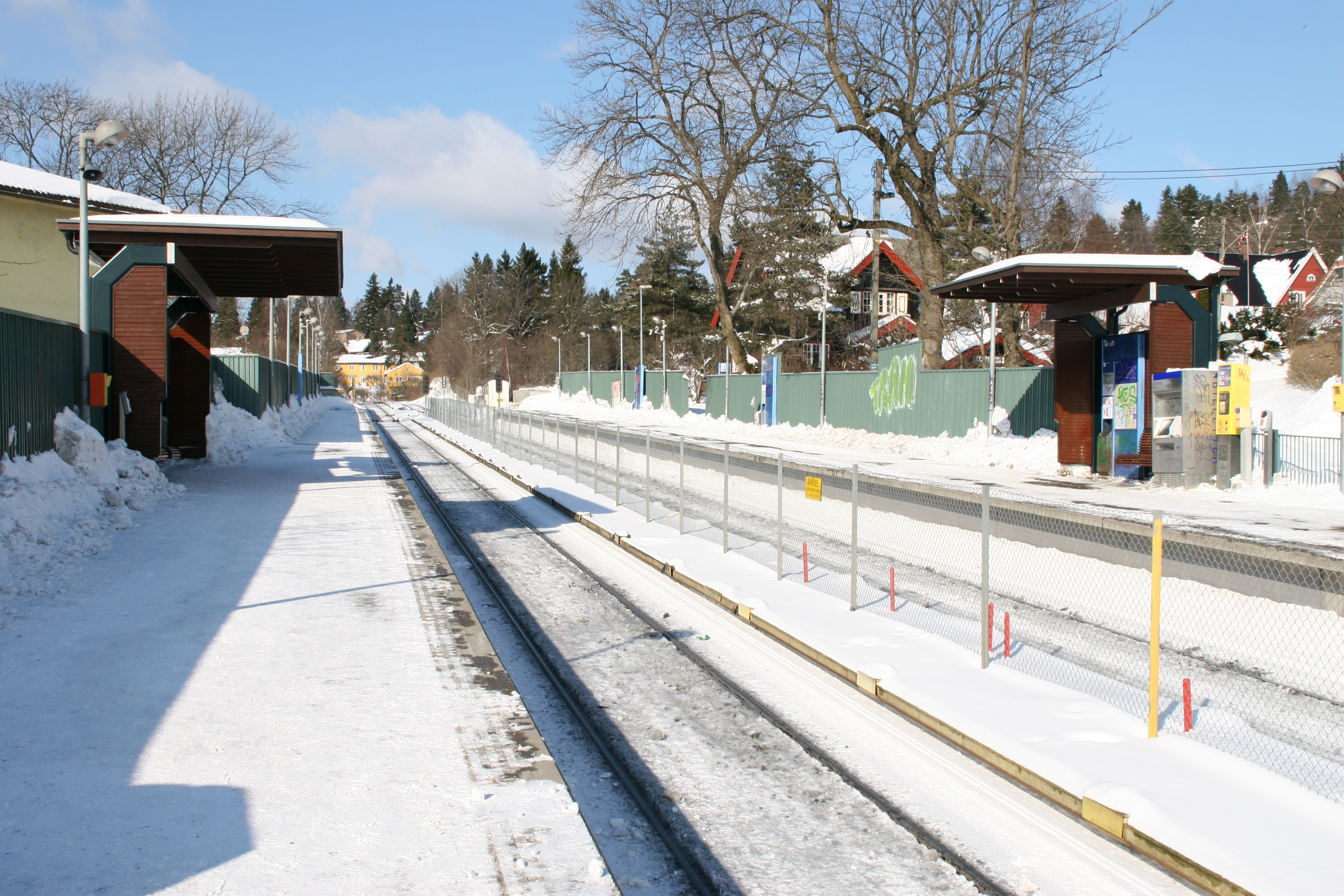

General information
- Location: Tåsen, Oslo; Norway
- Coordinates: 59°57′12″N 10°45′05″E
- Elevation: 123.3 m (405 ft)
- Owner: Sporveien
- Operator: Sporveien T-banen
- Line: Sognsvann Line
- Distance: 6.8 km (4.2 mi) from Stortinget
- Connections: Bus service: 23 Lysaker – Simensbråten; 24 Fornebu – Brynseng; 34 Tåsen – Ekeberg hageby

Construction
- Structure type: At-grade
- Accessible: Yes

History
- Opened: 10 October 1934

Services
| Preceding station | Oslo Metro | Following station |
|---|---|---|
| Østhorn towards Sognsvann | Line 5 | Berg towards Ring Line and Vestli |
Location

Tåsen is a station on the Sognsvann Line (line 5) of the Oslo Metro in Oslo, Norway. The station is located between Berg and Østhorn stations and is 6.8 kilometres (4.2 mi) from Stortinget. As one of the original stations on the line, Tåsen was opened on 10 October 1934. The station was moved 150 metres (490 ft) north in the 1990s, when the line was upgraded from light rail (with overhead wires) to rapid transit standard (third rail). In 1992, a fatal accident occurred when a T1300 train collided with a snow plowing car ahead of the station.

The station is located near a bridge over the circumferential highway Ring 3 and the roundabout of the Tåsen road intersection. The area around Tåsen is mainly residential, and there is a small shopping centre named Tåsen senter near the station.

== History ==
Tåsen station opened 10 October 1934, when Akersbanerne had built the line from Majorstuen to Sognsvann. The line was double-tracked from Majorstuen to Østhorn (then called Korsvoll), and single-tracked from there to Sognsvann. In 1939, the section Korsvoll–Sognsvann was upgraded to double track, and the station Korsvoll had its name changed to Østhorn.

Tåsen was part of Holmenkolbanen's network until 1973, when the municipality of Oslo bought all the company's stocks. In 1993, the stations were upgraded to metro standard, which involved a heightening and lengthening of the platforms, and installation of third rail power supply and a new signaling system.

== Service ==
Tåsen is served by line 5 on the Sognsvann Line, operated by Oslo T-banedrift on contract with Ruter. The rapid transit serves the station every 15 minutes, except in the late evening and on weekend mornings, when there is a 30-minute headway. Travel time along the 6.8-kilometre (4.2 mi) portion to Stortinget in the city center is 13 minutes.

The station provides correspondence to the bus lines 34, 23 and 24 in two stops near the roundabout in Rolf Wickstrøms vei. The subsidiary of NOR-WAY Bussekspress, Flybussekspressen, provides a connection to Oslo Airport, Gardermoen from Tåsen.

== Facilities ==
Tåsen has two platforms, each with a wooden shed. The sheds are drawn by Arne Henriksen in a minimalist and standardized style with constructions of wood and steel. The station is located in Tåsenveien, near Tåsen school, shortly after a bridge over the circumferential highway Norwegian National Road 150. There is an underpass that was constructed in the 1960s on the other side of the bridge, that allows pedestrian access to the Tåsen senter mall. Tåsen serves mainly the residential area Tåsen, but also Korsvoll and Nordberg.
