= Berg, Oslo =

Neighborhood in Oslo, Norway

Coordinates: 59°57′05″N 10°44′45″E

Berg is a neighbourhood in the west side of Oslo. It is located in the borough Nordre Aker, and is surrounded by the neighbourhoods Nordberg in the north, Tåsen in the east and Ullevål Hageby in the southwest. Berg is named after an abandoned farm with the same name. Berg is mainly a residential area, and is served by the station Berg on the Sognsvann Line.

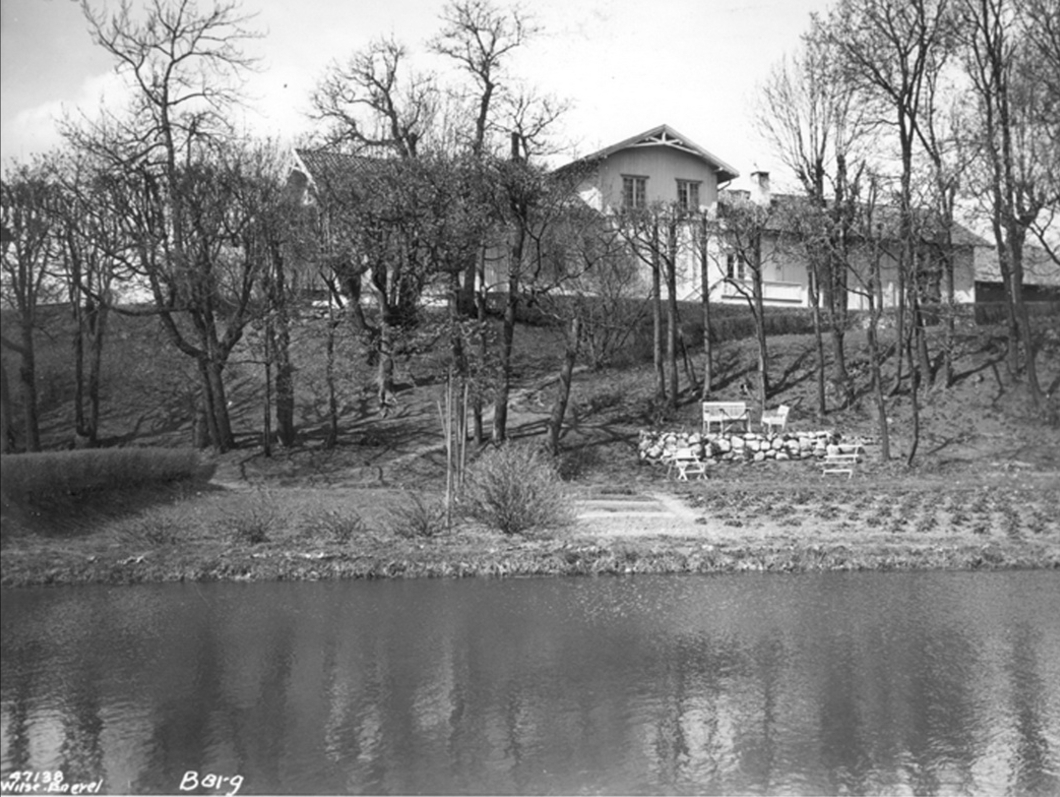
Berg farms main building, 1939
