= Kristofer Lange =

Norwegian architect (1886–1977)

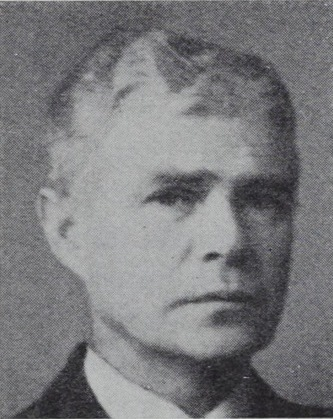
Kristofer Lange

Kristofer Andreas Lange (6 September 1886 – 27 April 1977) was a Norwegian architect.

He was born in Kristiania (now Oslo), Norway. He was son of architect Balthazar Lange (1854-1937) and his wife, Elise Klöcker (1857-1934). He attended the Royal Arts School (1905–09) and Kristiania Technical School (1909). He continued his studies at Königliche Technische Hochschule, Charlottenburg in Berlin (1911–12). He worked as an assistant of architect Henrik Bull (1909–11) and (1912–13). He established his own practice in Kristiania during 1915.

He received a number of municipal government assignments and is most associated with the regulation plan Solgryten for the area Sogn along the Sognsvann Line in Oslo during the 1920s.

== Gallery ==
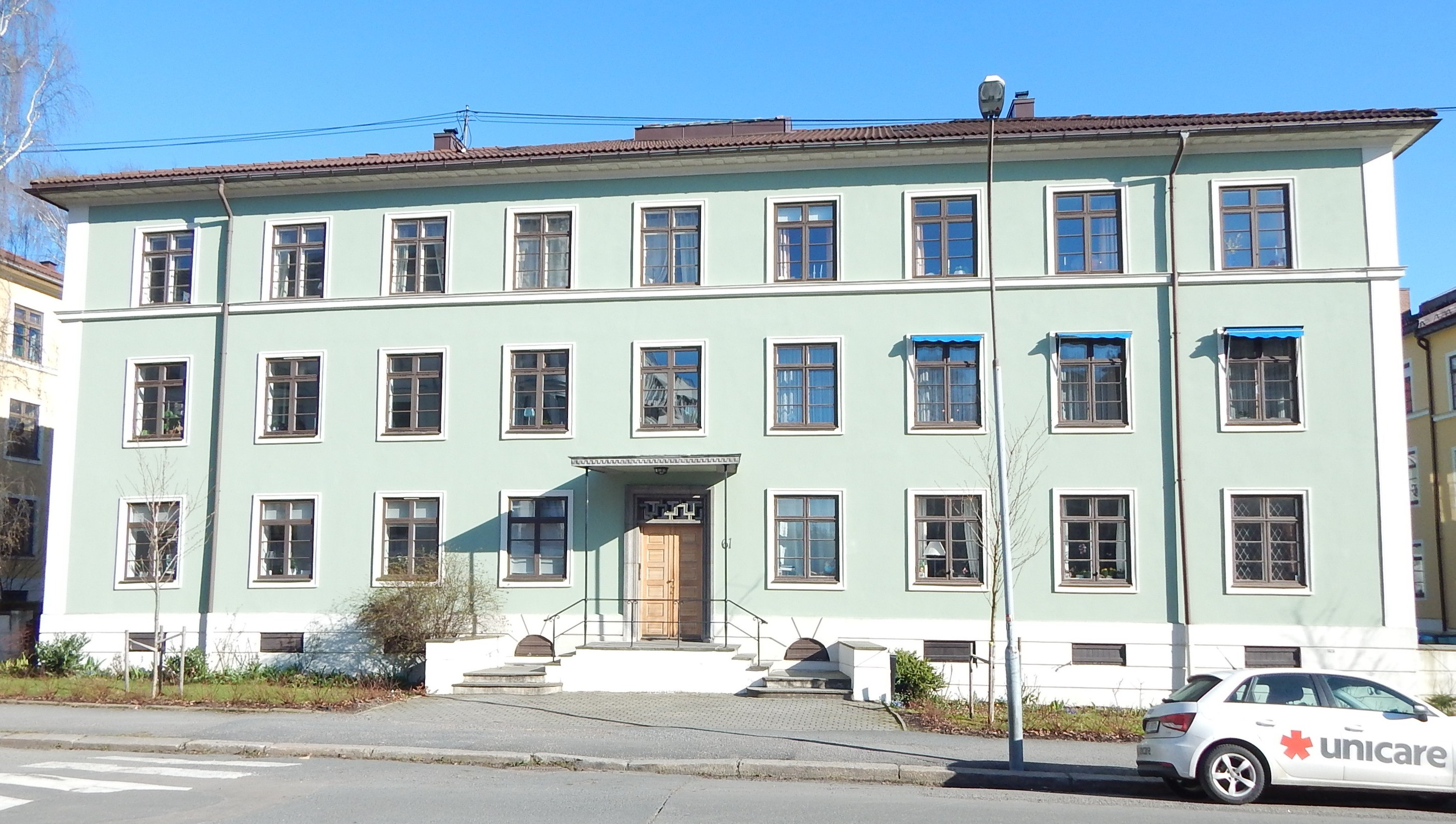
Eckersbergs gate 61

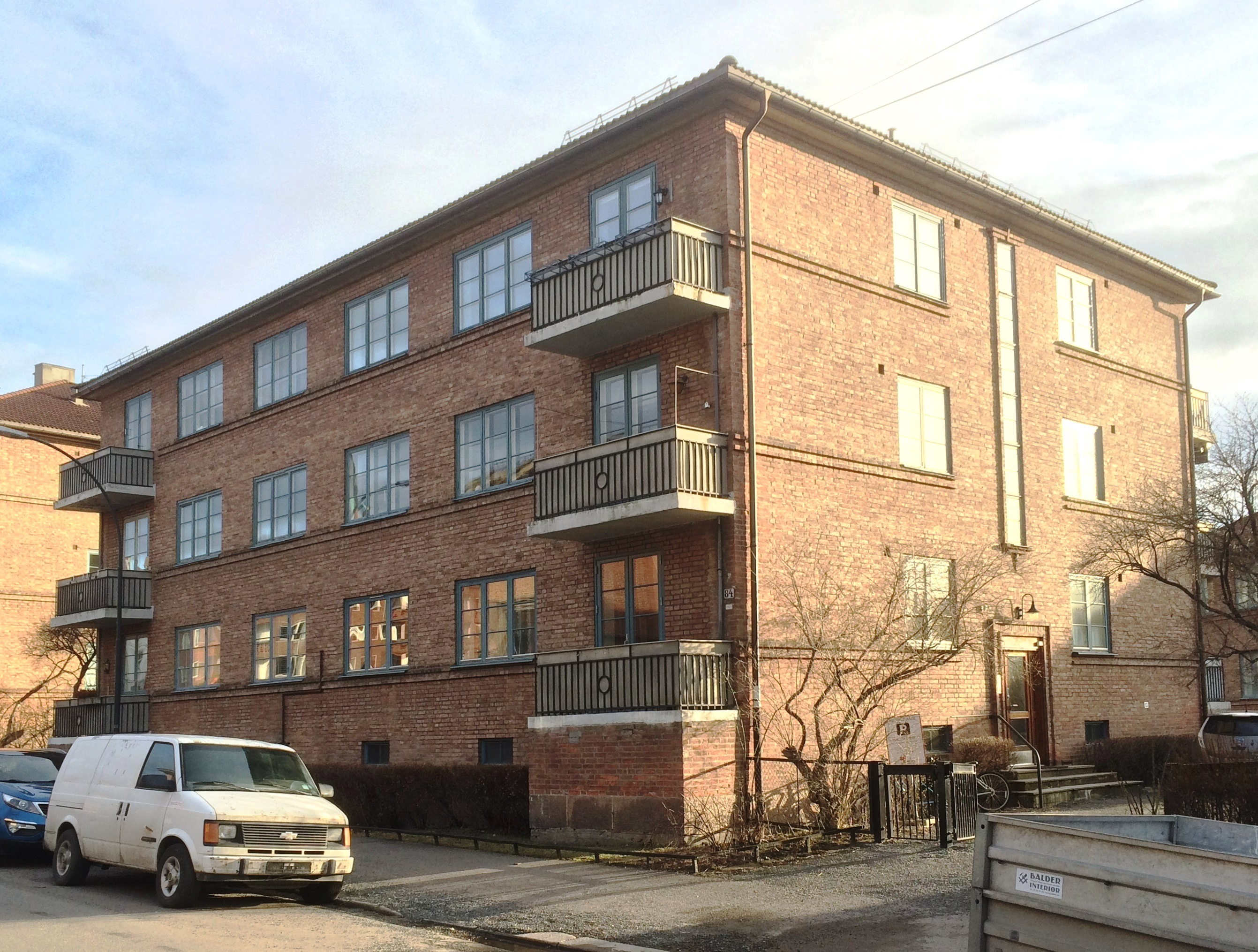
Briskebyveien 84

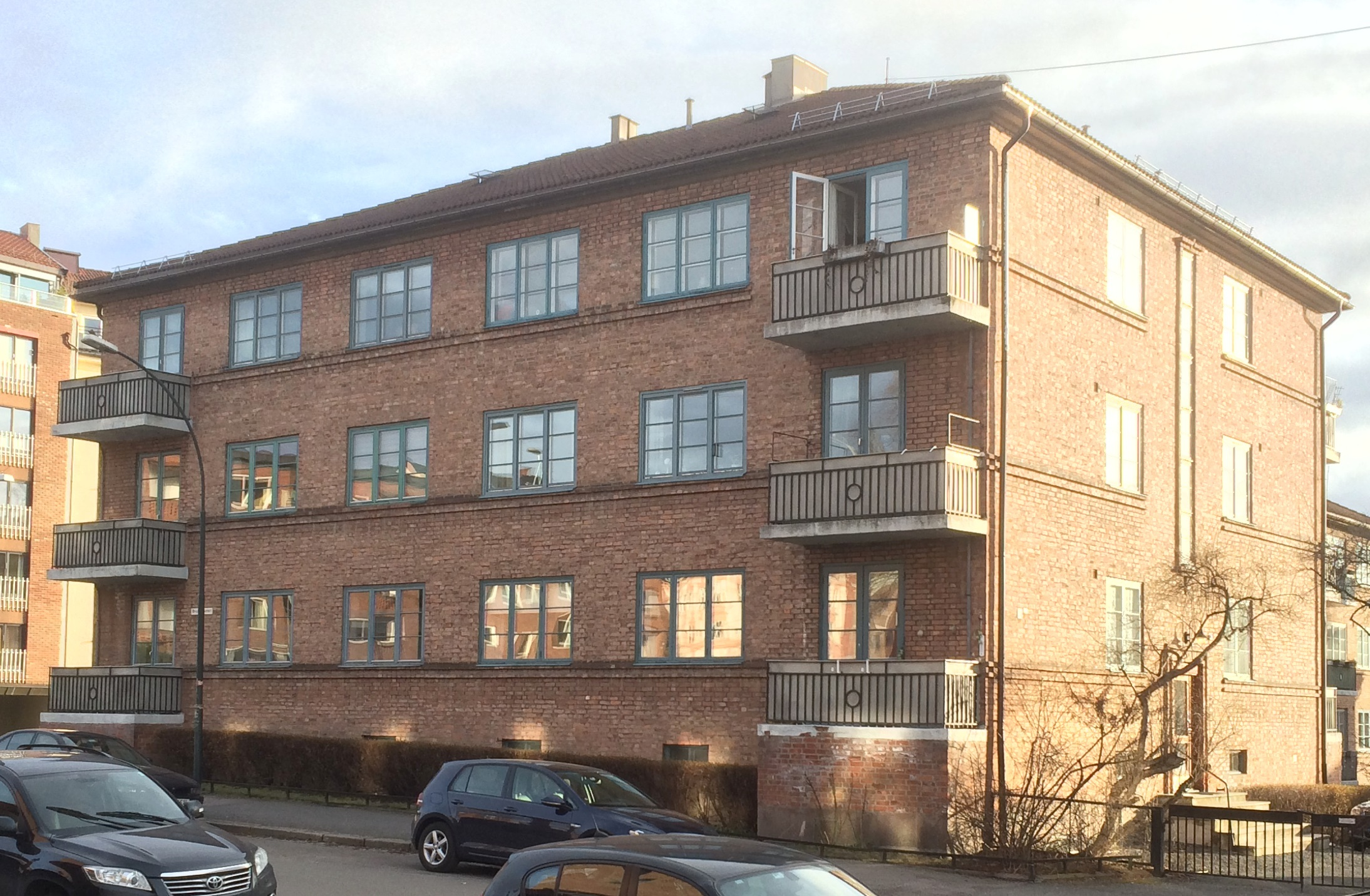
Løvenskiolds gate 24

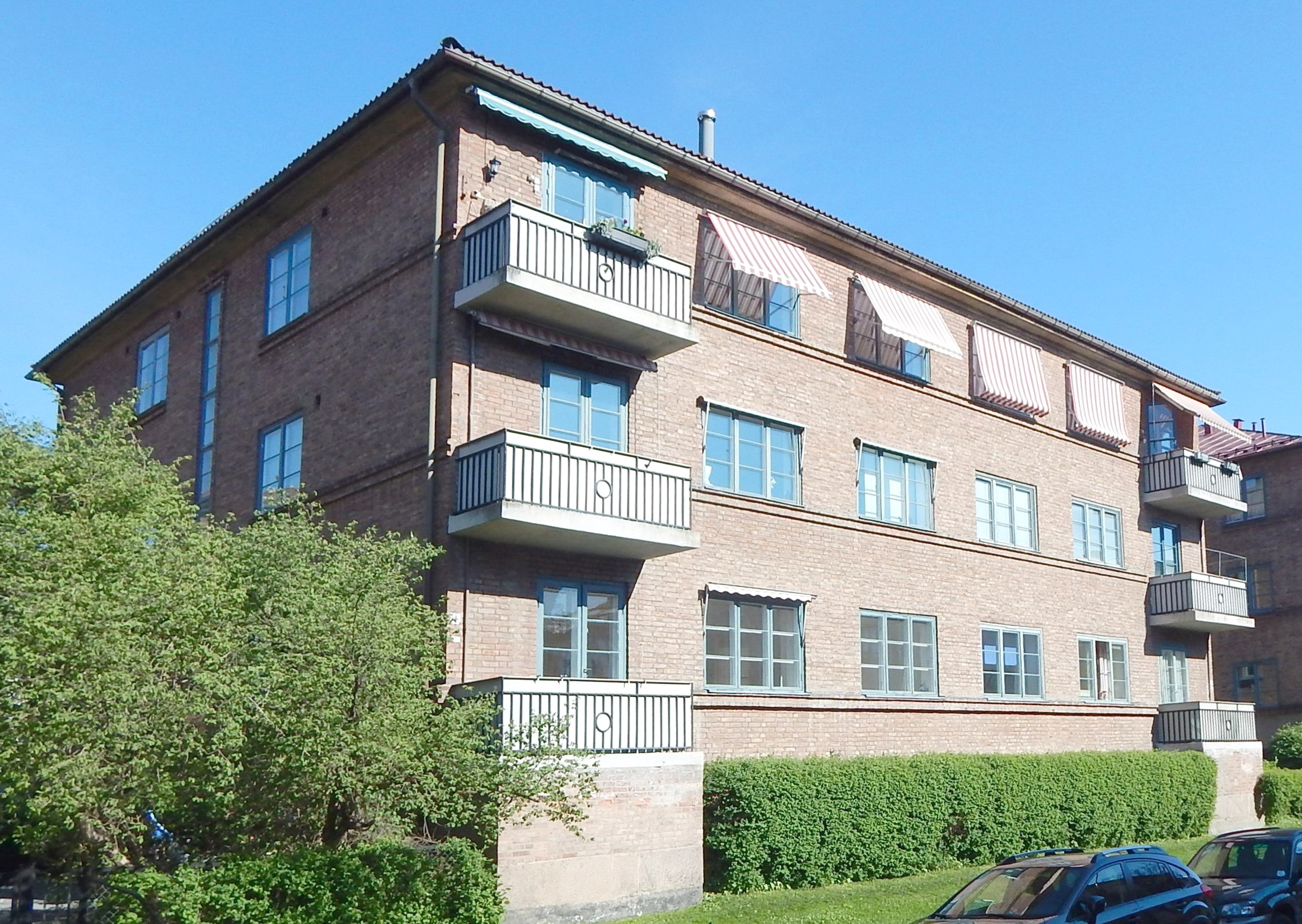
Schives gate 1

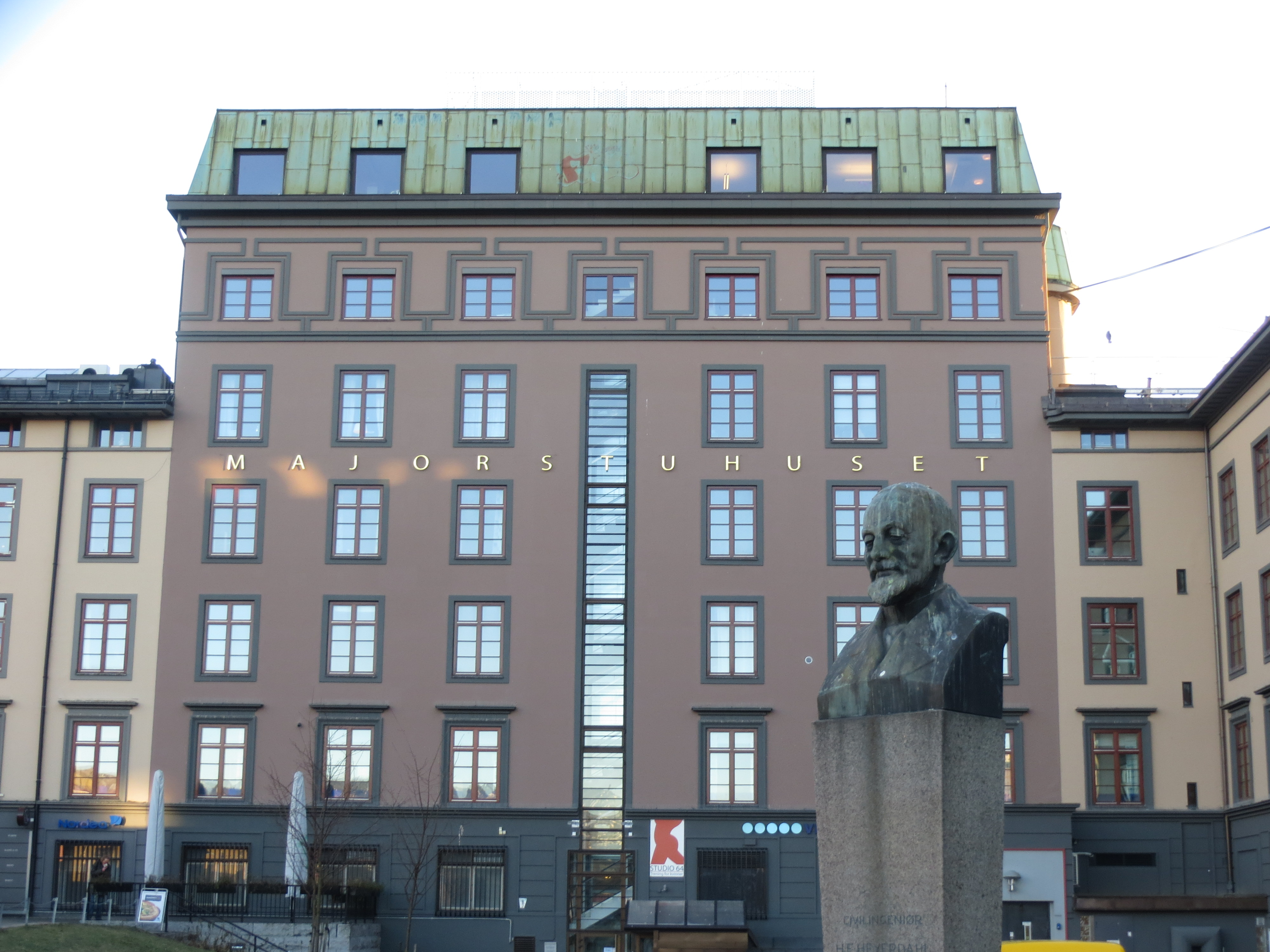
Majorstuhuset in Oslo
