= Sognsvann line =

Rapid transit line in Oslo, Norway

Sognsvann Line
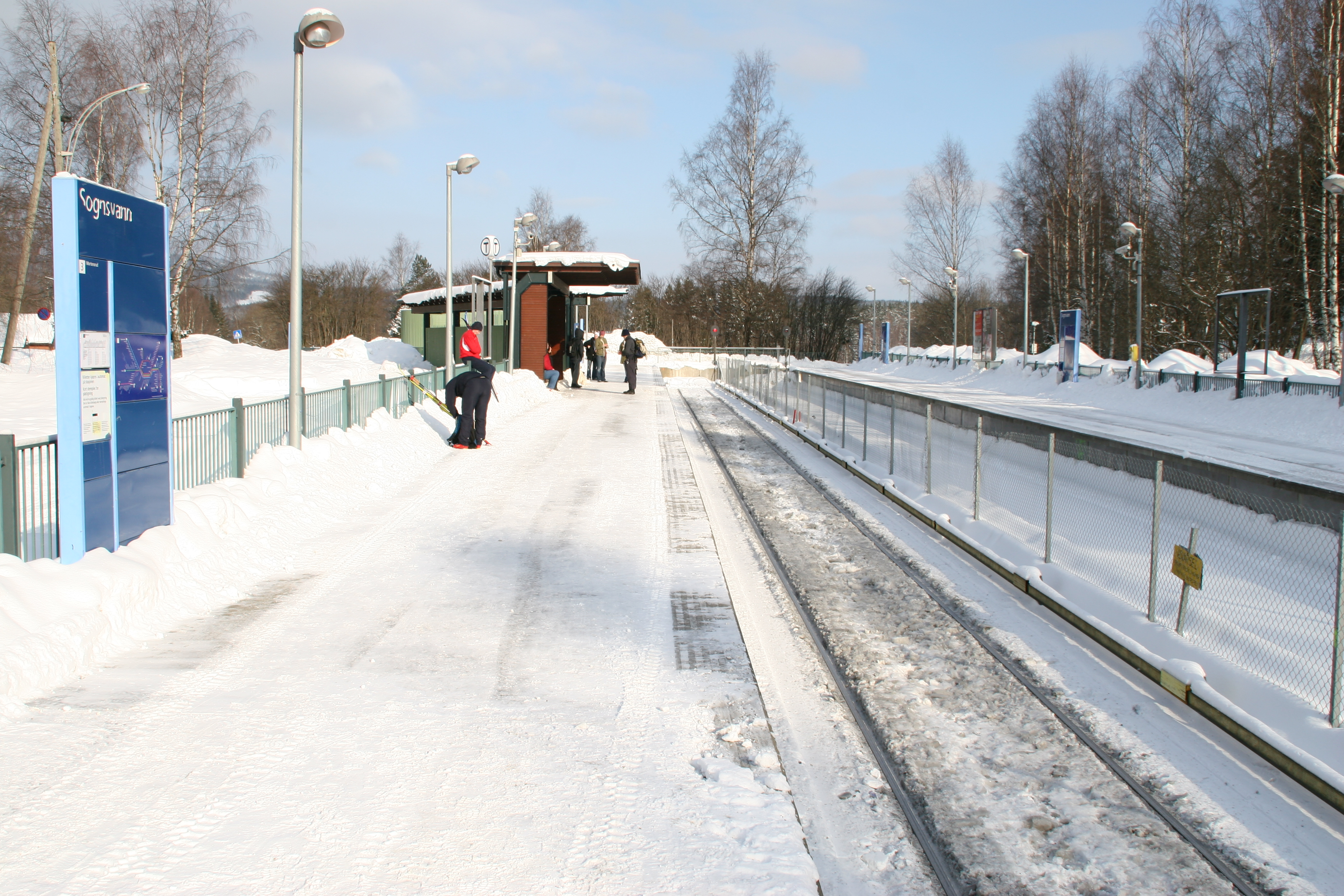
- Sognsvann is the terminus of the Sognsvann Line

Overview
- Native name: Sognsvannsbanen
- Owner: Sporveien
- Termini: Majorstuen; Sognsvann
- Stations: 9

Service
- Type: Rapid transit
- System: Oslo Metro
- Operator: Sporveien T-banen

History
- Opened: 10 October 1934

Technical
- Line length: 6 km (3.7 mi)
- Number of tracks: Double
- Track gauge: 1,435 mm (4 ft 8 1/2 in) standard gauge
- Electrification: 750 V DC third rail
- Operating speed: 70 km/h (43 mph)
- Highest elevation: 198.1 m (650 ft)

The Sognsvann Line (Norwegian: Sognsvannsbanen) is a rapid transit line on the Oslo Metro of Norway. It branches from the Common Tunnel at Majorstuen and runs 6.0 kilometers (3.7 mi) to Sognsvann. After Ullevål stadion, the Ring Line branches off. The Sognsvann Line serves the northwestern and northern neighborhoods of Oslo, mostly within the borough of Nordre Aker. The line is owned and maintained by Kollektivtransportproduksjon and has nine stations. The western end of line 5 serves the entire line. Line 4 and the eastern end of line 5 serve the southern part of the line up to Ullevål stadion before branching off and continuing along the Ring Line. This gives an average five-minute headway on the southern part and an average fifteen-minute headway on the northern part of the line.

The line opened on 10 October 1934 as a light rail. In 1993, it was upgraded to metro standard as the first light rail west of Oslo, with two stations being closed. The Ring Line opened in 2003. Forskningsparken has transfer to the Oslo Tramway and serves Rikshospitalet. Forskningsparken and Blindern both serve the University of Oslo, while Ullevål stadion serves Norway's largest football venue. North of there the line mainly serves residential areas. Sognsvann serves the Norwegian School of Sport Sciences and the recreational area Nordmarka.

== History ==
The first plans for a light rail along the route of the Sognsvann Line were launched by Holmenkolbanen in 1904. They called for a branch from Gaustad Station on the Holmenkoll Line to Geitmyren and onwards to Sagene. The next proposal for a line was launched in 1917, when Aker Municipality established the company Akersbanerne. It started work planning the Østensjø Line as well as the Sognsvann Line. The neighborhoods of Sogn and Tåsen were being built, and the municipality wanted to establish a good transport system to make the areas more attractive. Holmenkolbanen stated that they should be prioritized to build the system, since they already had a line in the area, but the municipality wanted to have political control over the development of the area.

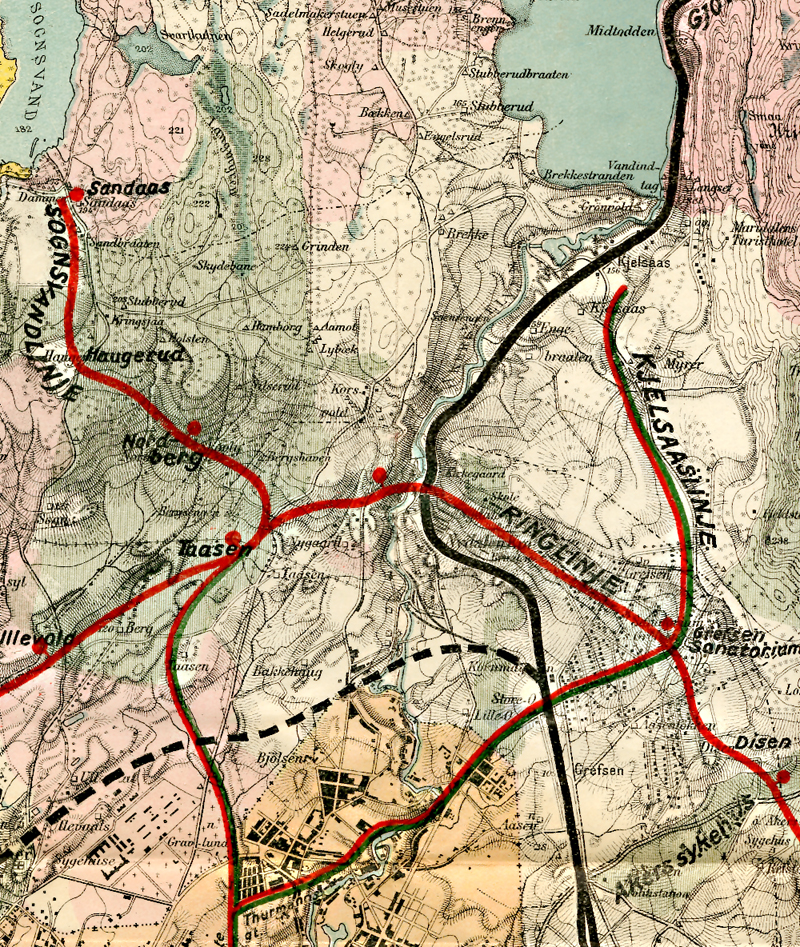
Map of various proposals for lines in northern Oslo

In 1920, Holmenkolbanen applied to build a branch from Frøen via Tåsen to Nydalen and Grefsen, along what is today the Ring Line. This proposal included a branch to Sognsvann. The Ministry of Labour granted the concession to Akersbanerne, who started construction in January 1922. However, due to a labor conflict, the work was put on hold in 1924. In 1924, the Røa Line (at the time called the Smestad Line) was taken over by Akersbanerne, but Holmenkolbanen retained the operation. After the first part of the Common Tunnel, from Majorstuen to Nationaltheatret, opened in 1928, Holmenkolbanen was in financial distress, and in 1932 Akersbanerne took over the majority of the shares of Holmenkolbanen. At the same time, the Røa and Sognsvann Lines were merged into Holmenkolbanen.

Work commenced again in 1933 and the line opened on 10 October 1934. At first the line was built with double track from Frøen to Østhorn and single track to Sognsvann. Between 1937 and 1939, the upper section was converted to double track. The construction spurred a massive residential construction along the line giving a good foundation for ridership.

After the municipal merger between Oslo and Aker in 1948, Akersbanerne was merged into Oslo Sporveier, although Holmenkolbanen remained a partially owned subsidiary. In 1973, Oslo Sporveier bought the remaining shares, and two years later the operations were transferred to Oslo Sporveier, with Holmenkolbanen remaining a pure real estate company. The municipal take-over resulted in an upgrade to both the track and the rolling stock. New overhead wires and new and heavier track were laid. From 1978, the T1300 trains were taken into use. With the take-over, the lines were numbered, and the Sognsvann Line designated 81, although this was quickly changed to 13.

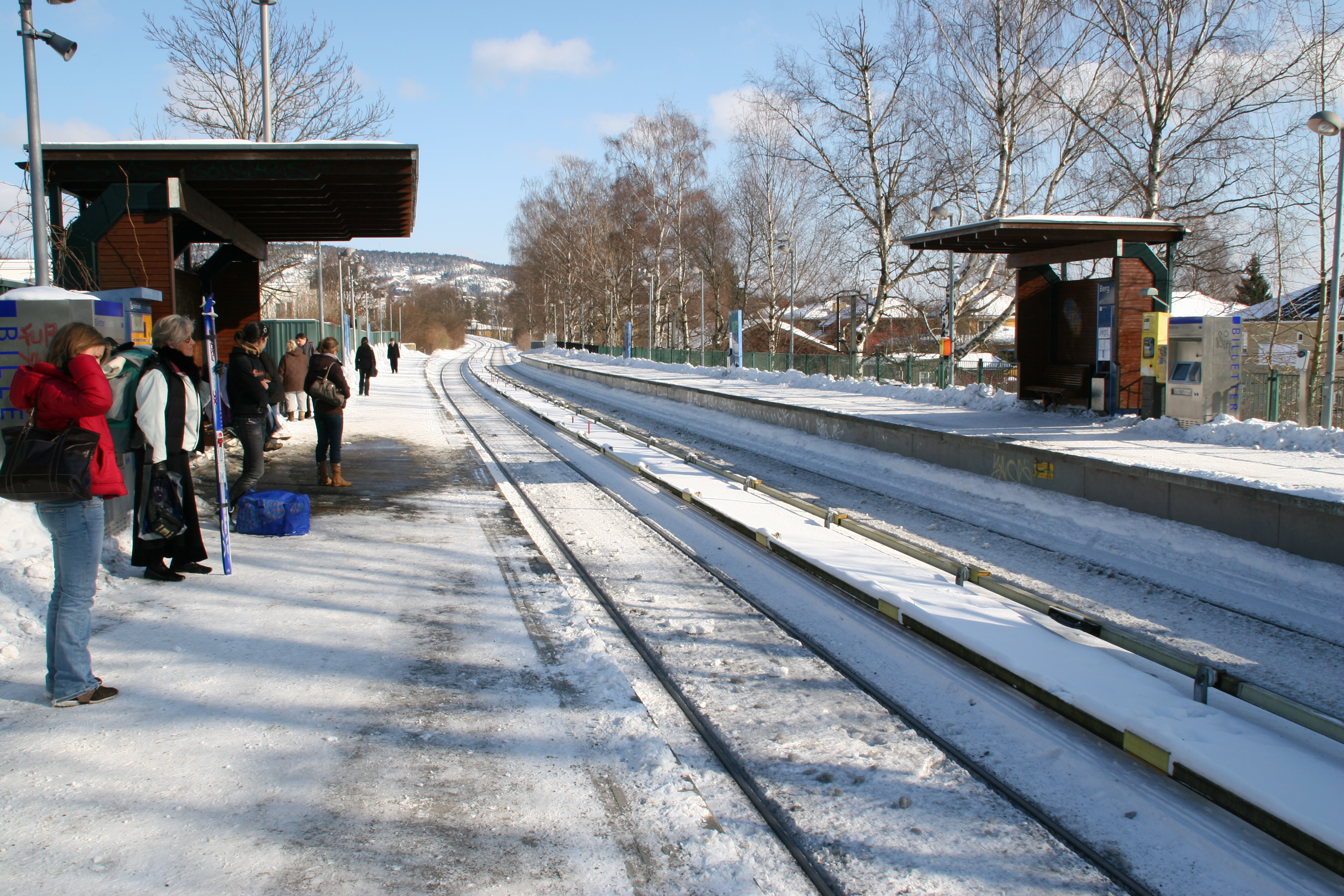
Berg

During the 1980s, the city decided to connect the four suburban lines west of the city center with the Oslo Metro. The Sognsvann Line was selected as the first line to be upgraded, so the two systems would become compatible. The line was upgraded to metro standard by replacing the overhead wire with a third-rail power supply and installing automatic train protection. All the stations were rebuilt, with platforms lengthened from fitting two-car to fitting four-car trains, and the platform height increased. The third rail required all level crossings to be removed, resulting in the line being rebuilt several places to allow the road to underpass or overpass. The light rail permitted passengers to cross the lines at the stations, but this was made impossible with metro standard. Because of this, underpasses or overpasses were built at the stations.

Frøen Station was rebuilt so only the trains on the Holmenkollen Line would stop there, while Nordberg Station was closed. All the stations, except Ullevål stadion, were built in the same architectural style. They are constructed in concrete with steel columns and wooden sheds and fences. All platforms have a shed; Ullevål stadion has a larger weather cover and has a design inspired by football. The upgrade also included the installation of third-rail from Majorstuen to Stortinget in the Common Tunnel. From 10 January 1993, the Sognsvann Line re-open, and from 4 April, the line started operating through the Common Tunnel and connected to the Lambertseter Line. The new service became operated with T1000 rolling stock.

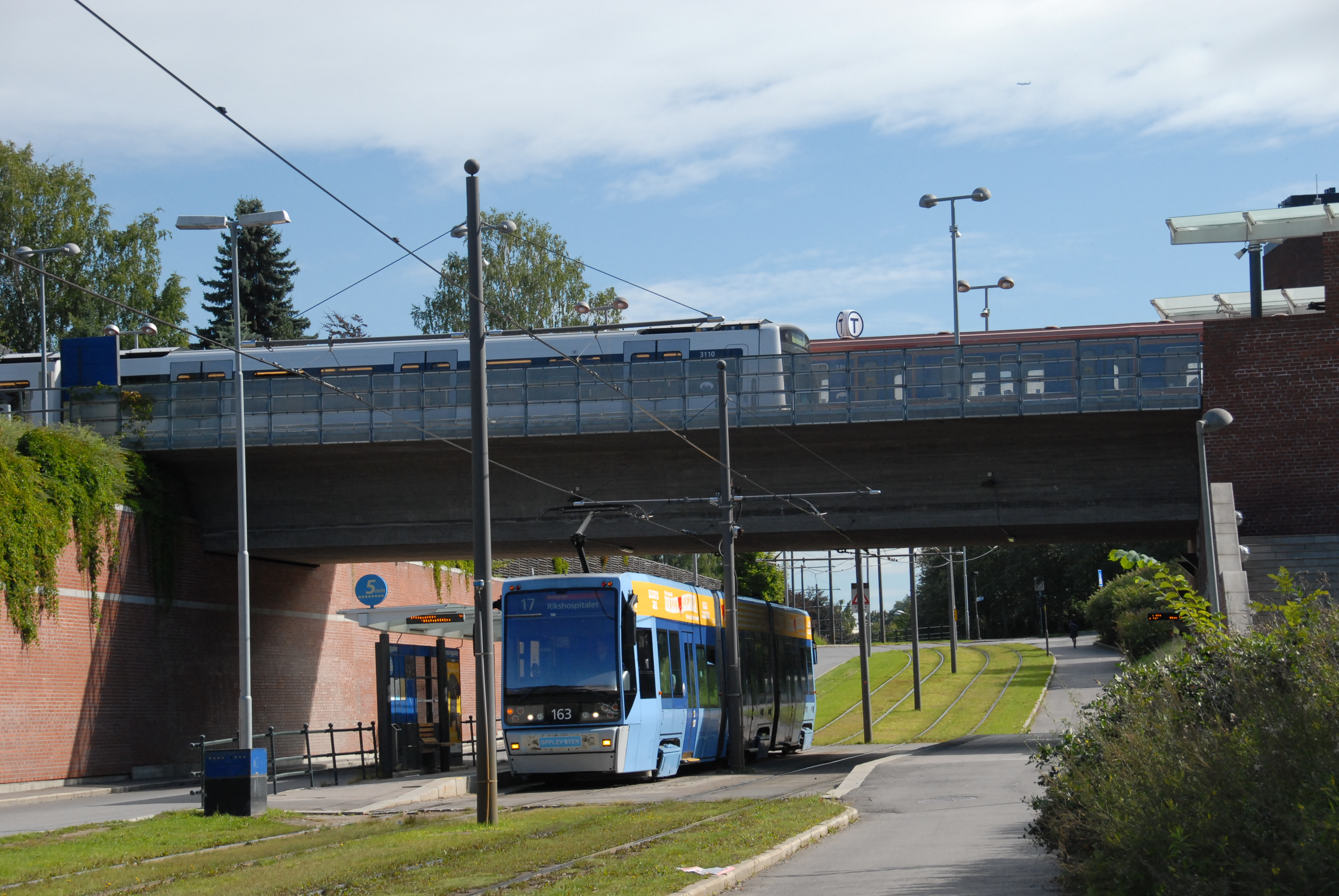
SL95 tram meets metro at Forskningsparken

Following the 1991 decision to build a new Rikshospitalet at Gaustad, it was decided to extend the Ullevål Hageby Line of the tramway there, which would pass under the Sognsvann Line. Plans called for a transfer station at Blindern, but this was later discarded in favor of a new station, Forskningsparken. It would replace Vestgrensa, which was considered too far away to be a suitable transfer point. Forskningsparken would also serve the northern part of the Blindern campus. Not until 1998 were the necessary political agreements in place to allow construction to start. The new light rail started services on 1 June 1999, and the rapid transit station opened on 22 August. With the opening, Line 4 of the metro was extended from Blindern, via Forskningsparken, to Ullevål stadion. There were complaints from local residents that the increased traffic on the line was causing too much noise, and neighbors demanded that noise shields be built.

In 1991, Oslo Sporveier presented plans to connect the Sognsvann Line to the Grorud Line with a new Ring Line. The company also considered building the ring as part of the tramway, and have combined operation with both tram and metro on the Sognsvann Line. This was later discarded, despite the higher investment costs with a metro, since the tramway would give higher operating costs and longer travel time. A detailed suggestion was presented by Oslo Sporveier in August 1996. It became clear that Berg would not be served by the Ring Line. Many neighbors to the Sognsvann Line complained about the proposal, stating that they had hoped that the section from Majorstuen to Berg would have been rebuilt as a tunnel. They also argued that it was irrational that the line was running at-grade in densely populated areas, while it would run in a tunnel through the then mostly unpopulated Nydalen. To compensate, Oslo Sporveier stated that they would build noise screens along the line.

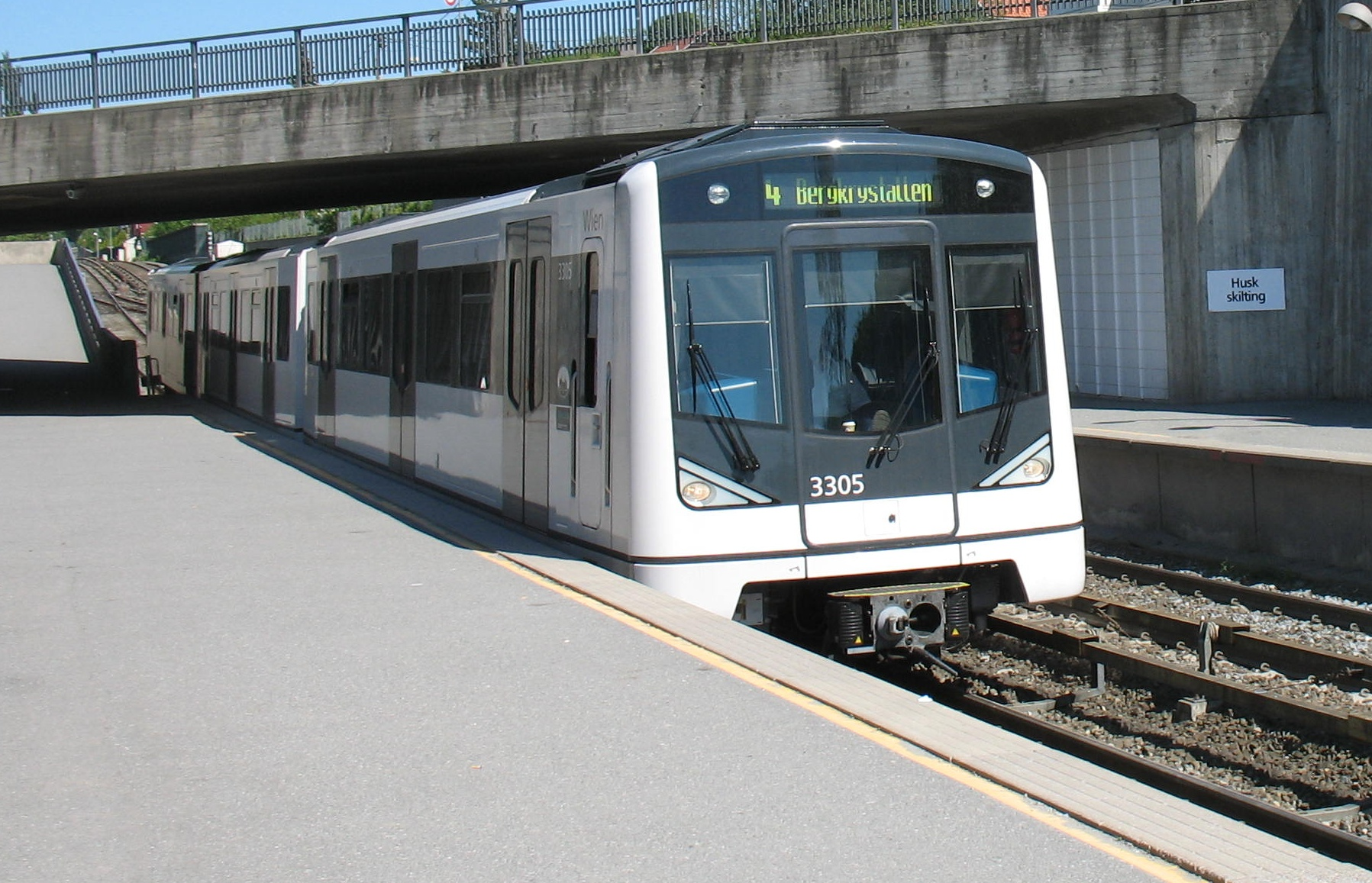
An MX3000 unit at Ullevål stadion

The city council voted in favor of building the Ring Line on 25 June 1997, against the votes of the Progress Party. Financing was partially ensured in December, when a political agreement was reached for Oslo Package 2, a financing plan for investments in public transport in Oslo and Akershus between 2002 and 2011. Construction started in June, with the Agency for Road and Transport of the municipality responsible for construction. The first section opened from Ullevål stadion via Nydalen to Storo on 20 August 2003. With the opening, Line 4 was extended from Ullevål stadion to Storo. On 20 August 2006, the final section opened, from Storo via Sinsen to Carl Berners plass.

In 2002, the Sognsvann Line was closed during the summer vacations due to improvements of the track and third rail. In 2008, the line was closed for approximately one week, due to leaves that had covered the tracks. The operation of the line was replaced by buses that served temporary stops in Nordbergveien and Sognsveien. In 2010, a truck was stuck under the train bridge between Holstein and Kringsjå over Carl Kjeldsens vei. The bridge was damaged, and allowed for only one-way-traffic for two weeks. Half the trains had to stop at Berg in the meantime.

== Route ==
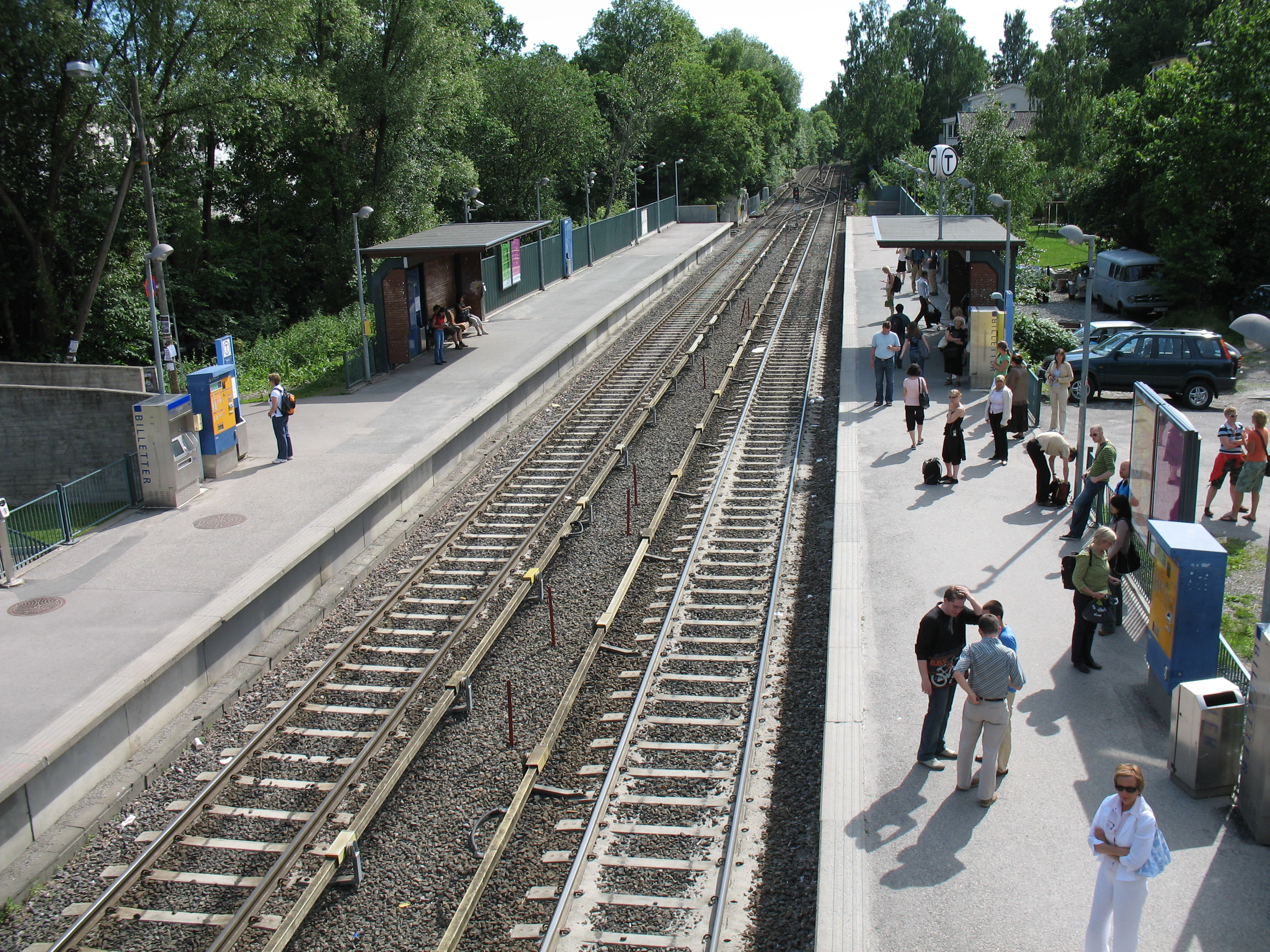
Blindern serves the main campus of the University of Oslo

The line branches off from the Common Tunnel after Majorstuen, and heads northwards through the borough of Nordre Aker. The first two stations, Blindern and Forskningsparken, serve the Blindern campus of the University of Oslo. At Forskningsparken, there is transfer to the Ullevål Hageby Line of the Oslo Tramway, which allows connection with the two largest hospitals in the country: Rikshospitalet and Ullevål University Hospital. Ullevål stadion serves Norway's largest sports venue, Ullevål Stadion, the home ground of Norwegian Premier League side Vålerenga and the national football team.

North of Ullevål stadion, just before reaching Berg, the Ring Line with services 3 and 4 branches off. The Ring Line serves three stations, Nydalen, Storo and Sinsen before reaching the Grorud Line. From Berg to Tåsen, the line runs parallel to the motorway Ring 3. North of Berg, the Sognsvann Line mainly serves residential areas, including student dormitories at Sogn and Kringsjå. The Norwegian School of Sport Sciences and the National Archives of Norway is served by Sognsvann Station. The station also serves the recreational area Nordmarka and the lake Sognsvann.

== Service ==
The Sognsvann Line is served by lines 4 and 5 of the Oslo Metro. Half of line 5 trains operate the full length of the Sognsvann Line, while line 4 and the other half of the line 5 trains branch off after Ullevål stadion and serve the Ring Line. All services operate with a fifteen-minute headway, except during late evenings and weekend mornings. This gives the stations Blindern, Forskningsparken and Ullevål stadion an average five-minute headway to the city center and all stations in the Common Tunnel, and an average ten-minute headway to Nydalen and Storo. On the east side of the city, Line 5 connects with the Ring Line, and makes a full loop before it leaves Oslo on the Grorud Line. Line 4 connects with the Lambertseter Line. Travel time from Stortinget to Sognsvann is 18 minutes. The Oslo Metro is operated by Oslo T-banedrift on contract with Ruter.

Transfer to the Kolsås, Røa and Holmenkollen Lines is possible at Majorstuen. Transfer to Oslo Central Station, which serves all mainline trains in Eastern Norway, is available at Jernbanetorget. Most west-bound mainline trains can also be reached at Nationaltheatret. The Oslo Tramway can be reached from Majorstuen and Forskningsparken, as well as in the city center from Jernbanetorget, Stortinget and Nationaltheatret.
