= Korsvoll =

Neighborhood in Oslo, Norway

Coordinates: 59°57′45.65″N 10°45′4.77″E

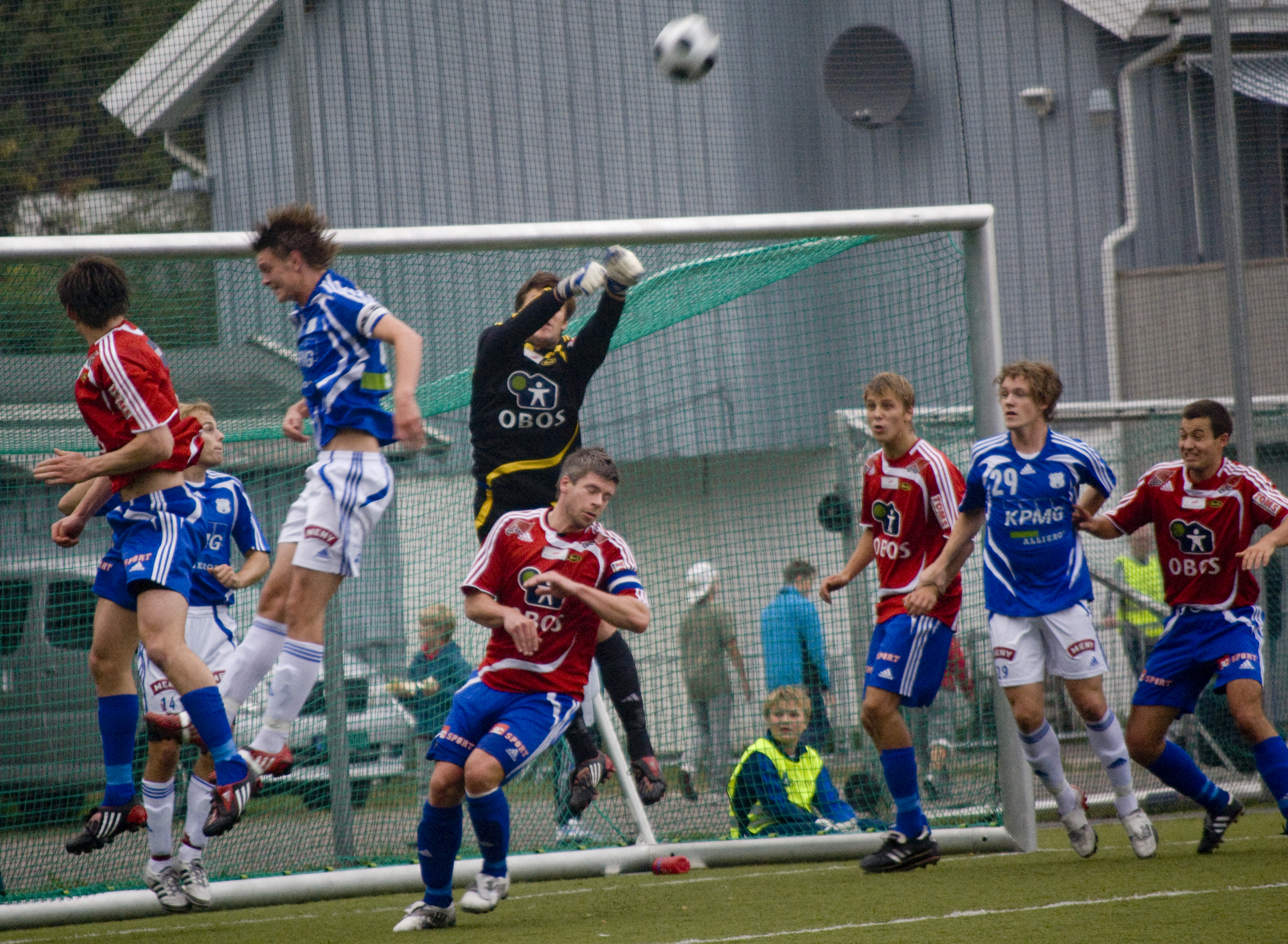
Korsvoll IL - Skeid Fotball, Norwegian second division group 2, 7 September 2008

Korsvoll is an area in the borough Nordre Aker in Oslo, Norway.

The area is located between the areas Brekke and Nordberg, northwest of the old industrial area Nydalen. The area borders on the forest area Nordmarka, and is a popular residential area for families. The local sports club is Korsvoll IL. The local school is Korsvoll primary school, placed close to the forest area.
