= Berg Upper Secondary School =

- Berg videregående skole
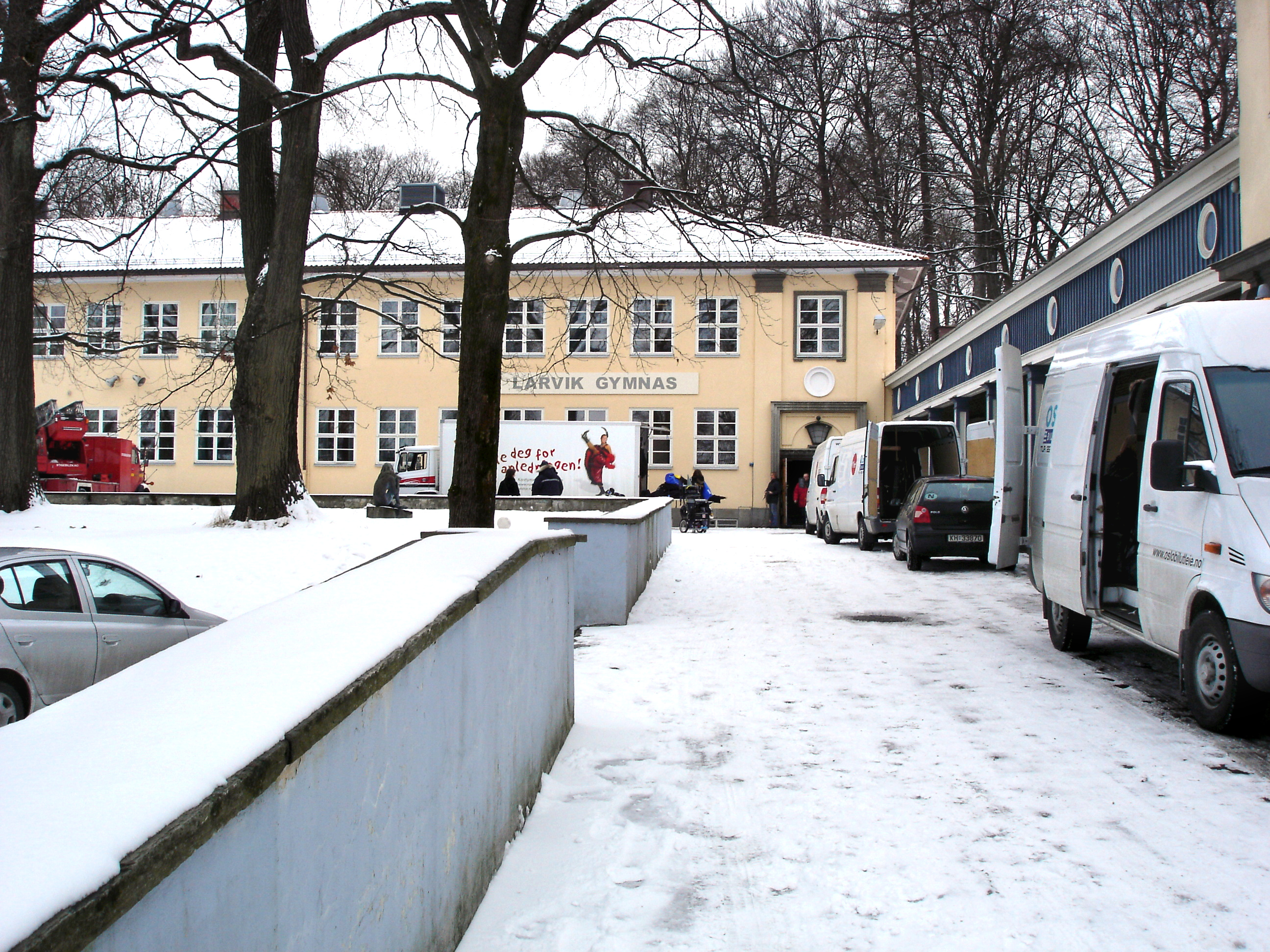
- The school was used during the filming of Dag Solstad's Gymnaslærer Pedersen

Location
- John Colletts allé 106; Oslo; Norway
- Coordinates: 59°56′58.07″N 10°44′29.48″E

Information
- School type: Public secondary school
- Motto: Knowledge, culture and tradition
- Founded: 1925
- Closed: 2014
- Grades: 11–13
- Age range: 16–19
- Classes offered: General education International Baccalaureate
- Language: Norwegian; English
- Campus: Suburban

Berg Upper Secondary School (Norwegian: Berg videregående skole) was an upper secondary school located in Oslo, Norway. The school was established in 1925 and provided education leading to the International Baccalaureate (IB) Diploma as well as the college preparatory "studiespesialisering" of the Norwegian school system. The school was closed in 2014, and most programs and employees moved to the new Blindern Upper Secondary School. The buildings are now the location of Berg skole.

In its final years, the school had around 465 students - 108 graduating in the Norwegian system and 55 graduating with IB Diplomas each year. About 70 faculty members worked at the school.

It was the first Norwegian educational institution to offer the IB Diploma (in 1978) and was a leading institution in several educational reforms. The school was ranked among the best performing schools in the International Baccalaureate system.

Berg had several winners of the national science competitions. Among these are Magnus Deli Vigeland and Nina Holden, who both have won the Abel Competition.

== Notable alumni ==
- Arvid Storsveen (1915–1943), engineer and founder of the WWII resistance/intelligence organisation XU
- Erik Diesen (1922–1999), journalist and television pioneer
- Nils Christie (1928–2015), sociologist and criminologist
- Helge Reiss (1928–2009), actor
- Ole Peter Kolby (born 1939), diplomat and former president of the UN Security Council
- Jon Skolmen (born 1940), actor and comedian
- Finn Wagle (born 1941), former primate in the Church of Norway and bishop in Nidaros (Trondheim)
- Else Bugge Fougner (born 1944), lawyer and former minister of justice
- Trond Kirkvaag (1946–2007), comedian
- Ivar Formo (1951–2006), Olympic gold medalist
- Lars Saabye Christensen (born 1953), novelist, recipient of the Nordic Council Prize for Literature
- Per Christian Ellefsen (born 1954), actor
- Per Boye Hansen (born 1957), Director of Bergen International Festival
- Siri Bjerke (born 1958), Divisional Director in Innovation Norway, former Minister of Environment
- Torstein Bieler (born 1959), musician
- Vigdis Hjorth (born 1959), novelist
- Lars Fredrik Beckstrøm (born 1960), musician (deLillos)
- Gabriel R. G. Benito (born 1960), Dean and Professor BI Norwegian Business School
- Rune Bjerke (born 1960), President and CEO of DnB NOR
- Ida Hjort Kraby (born 1960), lawyer
- Vetle Lid Larssen (born 1960), novelist
- Jonas Gahr Støre (born 1960), Norwegian Minister of Foreign Affairs, former Secretary General of the Norwegian Red Cross and Executive Director in the World Health Organization (WHO)
- Inger Marie Sunde (born 1961), former Chief Public Prosecutor (førstestatsadvokat), prosecutor in the case against "DVD-Jon"
- Hege Duckert (born 1962), journalist and editor of Dagbladet
- Henrik Mestad (born 1964), actor
- Helene Uri (born 1964), novelist
- Fredrik Skavlan (born 1966), journalist, illustrator and television personality
- Simen Agdestein (born 1967), International chess grandmaster and National Team player in soccer
- Bård Folke Fredriksen (born 1967), head of the Conservative Party in Oslo City Council
- Henrik H. Langeland (born 1972), novelist
- Håvard Homstvedt (born 1976), New York based painter
- Nikolai Astrup (born 1978), Member of the Norwegian Parliament, vice chairman of Oslo Conservative Party and former editor of the Minerva political magazine
- Elisabeth O. Sjaastad (born 1978), film director
- Petrit Selimi (born 1979), Foreign Minister of Kosovo
- Simen Hegstad Krüger (born 1993), Olympic gold medalist, cross country skiing

== The International Baccalaureate Diploma ==
IB at Berg requires a student to study languages, social sciences, natural sciences and mathematics over two years. It is based on the first year of Norwegian videregående skole, or similar academic preparation. The IB Diploma course which is taught in English, is designed to cater for internationally mobile student applicants and Norwegian students interested in a secondary school education offering notably a somewhat greater in-depth study in three of the university preparatory subjects, taught in English.

Berg was authorized to teach the IB Diploma in 1978.
