= Sognsvann station =

Oslo metro station

Sognsvann
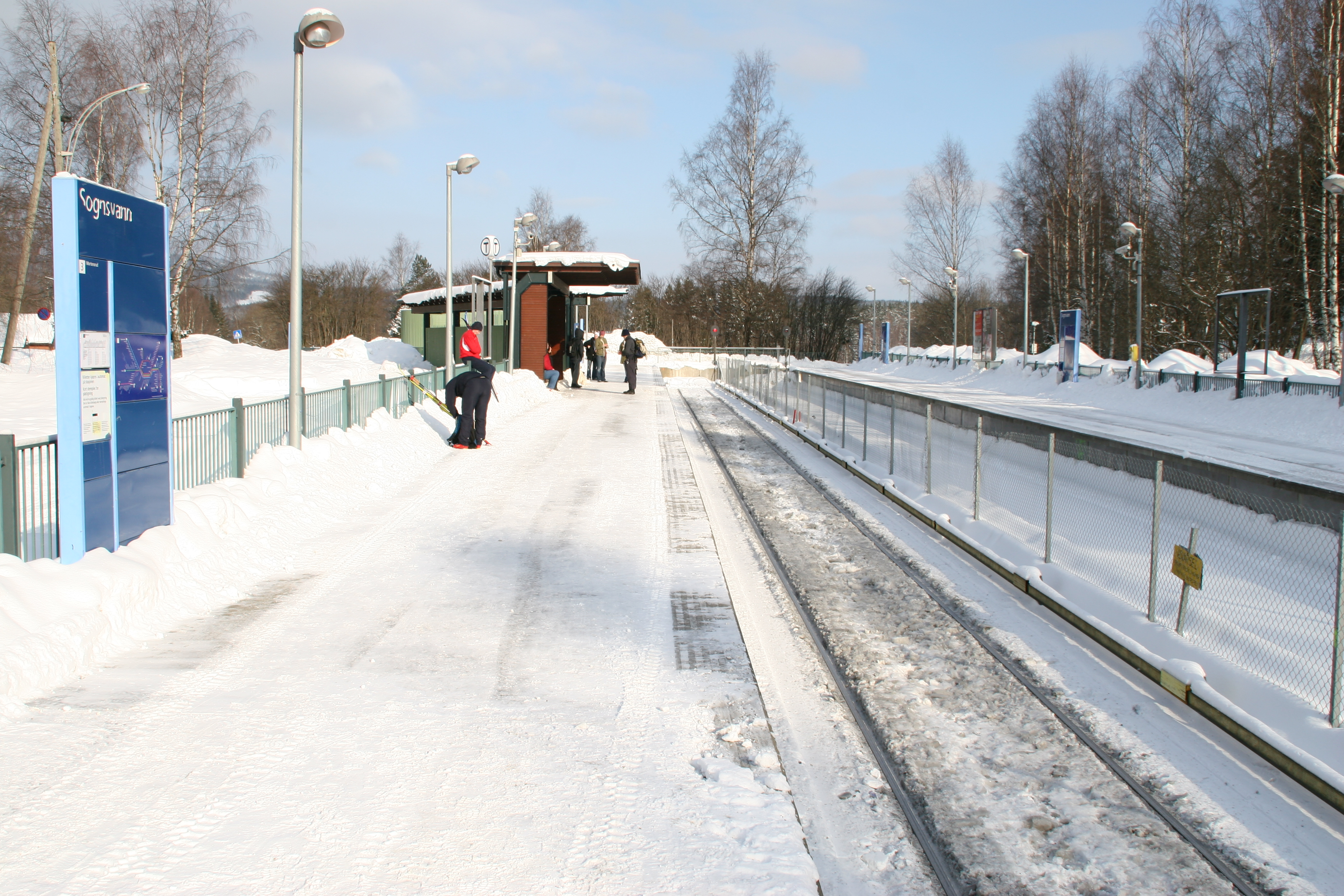
- Sognsvann Station on a wintery day

General information
- Location: Sognsvann, Oslo; Norway
- Coordinates: 59°58′01″N 10°44′2″E
- Elevation: 198.1 m (650 ft) AMSL
- Owner: Sporveien
- Operator: Sporveien T-banen
- Line: Sognsvann Line
- Distance: 8.7 km (5.4 mi) from Stortinget
- Platforms: 2 side platforms

Construction
- Structure type: At-grade
- Accessible: Yes
- Architect: Arne Henriksen

History
- Opened: 10 October 1934
- Rebuilt: 1993

Passengers
- 2002: 854 (boarding weekday average)

Services
Preceding station	Oslo Metro	Following station
Terminus	Line 5 Sognsvann Line	Kringsjå towards Vestli
Location

Sognsvann is a rapid transit station of the Oslo Metro's Sognsvann Line. It is situated Kringsjå neighborhood of the Oslo, Norway, borough of Nordre Aker. Located 8.7 kilometers (5.4 mi) from Stortinget, the station is served by Line 5 of the metro every fifteen minutes. Travel time to Stortinget is sixteen minutes.

The station opened on 10 October 1934 at the same times as the rest of the Sognsvann Line. The station received a major upgrade in 1993, in which it received longer platforms. The new station was designed by Arne Henriksen. The station is located next to and serves the Norwegian School of Sport Sciences and the National Archives of Norway, as well as the recreational area around the lake of Sognsvann.

== History ==
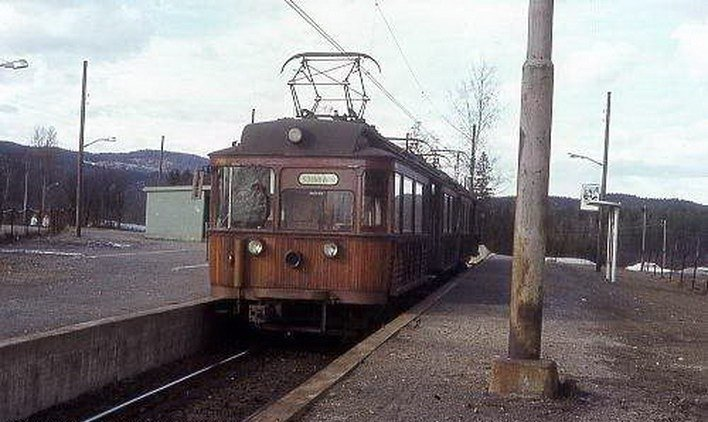
Tram at Sognsvann Station in 1976

The station was built as the original terminus of the Sognsvann Line. Construction started in 1933 and the station and line opened on 10 October 1934. The area around the station was originally a recreational area around the lake Sognsvann. At the station there were two cafés, which were demolished in the 1960s to allow for new developments. For decades the station was mostly used to reach recreational areas. The Norwegian School of Sport Sciences took its new campus next to the station into use in 1968, followed by the National Archives in 1978.

During the 1980s, the city decided to connect the four suburban lines west of the city center with the Oslo Metro. The Sognsvann Line was selected as the first line to be upgraded, so the two systems would become compatible. The line was upgraded to metro standard by replacing the overhead wire with a third-rail power supply and installing automatic train protection. For Sognsvann this also meant that the single track was replaced with a double track. From 4 April 1993 trains along the Sognsvann Line were connected to the eastern part of the metro, initially connected with the Østensjø Line.

== Service ==
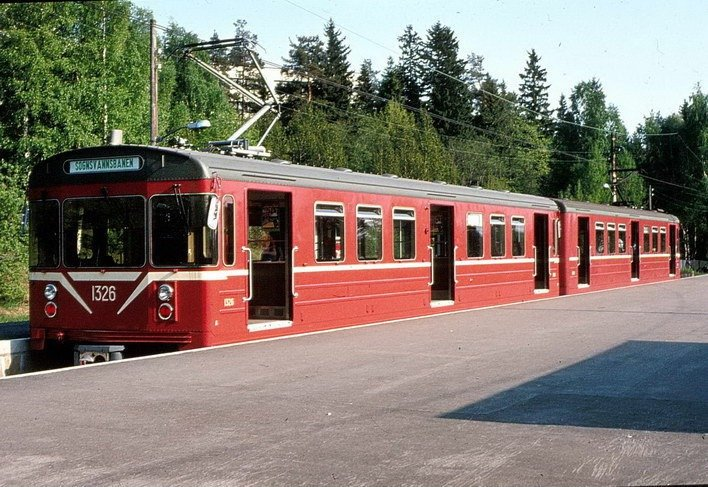
T1300 train at the station in 1983

The station is served by Line 5 of the Oslo Metro. During regular hours, it operates at a 15-minute headway. Travel time to Stortinget is sixteen minutes. Operations are carried out by Sporveien T-banen on contract with Ruter, the public transport authority in Oslo and Akershus. The infrastructure itself is owned by Sporveien, a municipal company. Service is provided using MX3000 three- and six-car trains. The station had an average 854 boarding passengers in 2002. Sognsvann is located in fare zone 1.

== Facilities ==
Kringsjå is a rapid transit station situated on the Sognsvann Line, 8.7 kilometers (5.4 mi) from Stortinget in the city center. It is situated at an elevation of 198.1 meters (650 ft) above mean sea level. It is open ground station featuring two side platforms. The station meets the metro standard of the Oslo Metro. This includes two 120-meter (390 ft) side platforms. The station is designed by Arne Henriksen and features a small steel and glued laminated timber roof on the one platform. As a terminal station, only the one platform is in regular use. It has a similar design to most of the other stations on the line.
