= Akersbanerne =

Norwegian tram operator

A/S Akersbanerne
- Company type: Municipal owned
- Industry: Transport
- Founded: 7 June 1917
- Headquarters: Aker, Norway
- Owner: Municipality of Aker

A/S Akersbanerne was a municipal owned company that operated tramways in the former Municipality of Aker in current Oslo, Norway. The company was established in 1917, and opened the suburban Østensjø Line tramway in 1926; it took over the majority ownership of Holmenkolbanen in 1933, that owned the Holmenkoll Line, Sognsvann Line and the Røa Line. Akersbanerne merged with Oslo Sporveier in 1949, following the merger of the municipalities.

== History ==
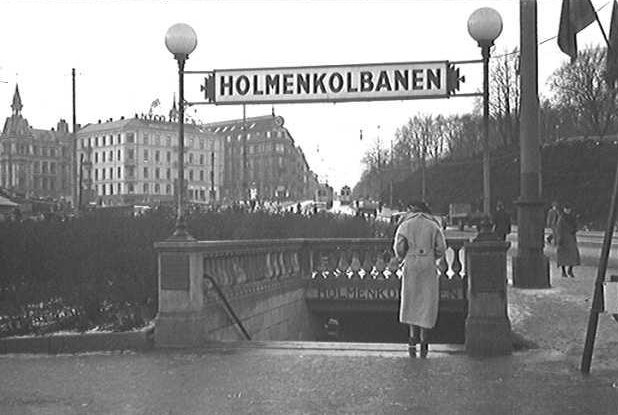
Nationaltheatret was the terminus for three of the Akersbanerne lines.

The company was founded on 7 June 1917 to coordinate the construction of new suburban tramways from Kristiania (now Oslo) to the new suburbs in Aker. The company planned to build several lines from the end of the street tramways in the city, and extend them on grade-separated right-of-way. The first project was the Østensjø Line; with construction starting in 1922 it opened from Vålerenga to Bryn on 18 December 1923 and to Oppsal on 10 January 1926. For the first three years street trams operated by Kristiania Sporveisselskab went the 1.5 km route to Bryn, but after the full line opened, Akersbanerne could never reach agreement with Oslo Sporveier, and not until 1937 did they run trams into the city center.

Also in 1922 the company started building the Sognsvann Line, and in 1924 it bought the Smestad Line from A/S Holmenkolbanen. In 1928 the Sognsvann Line and the Holmenkoll Line were extended from Majorstuen to Nationaltheatret, but the builder A/S Holmenkolbanen had acquired so much debt in the process that they on 16 November 1933 were forced to save the company by merging the Sognsvann and Smestad Line into Akersbanerne—giving the latter a majority ownership stake in the former. From 4 January 1937 Bærumsbanen took over the operation of trams on the Østensjø Line, though the ownership of the line remained with Akersbanerne.

On 1 January 1948 the municipalities of Oslo and Aker merged, and on 31 May 1949 the two municipal owned companies merged, taking the name of Oslo Sporveier.
