= Sognsvann =

Lake in Norway

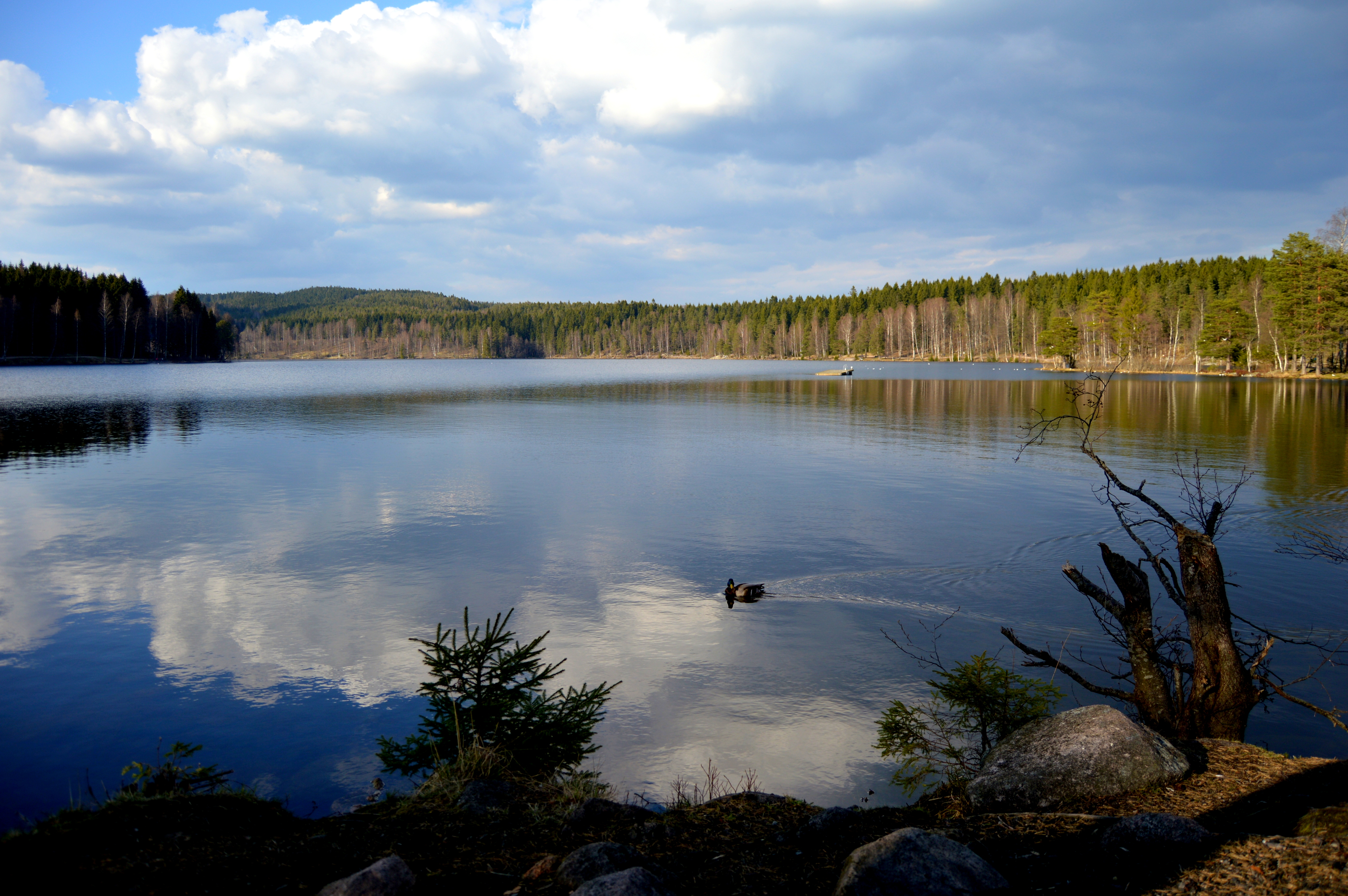
- The lake in April 2014

- Location within Norway
- Location: Oslo
- Coordinates: 59°58′31″N 10°43′39″E
- Basin countries: Norway
- Surface elevation: 183 m (600 ft)
- References: NVE

Sognsvann (or Sognsvannet) is a 3.3 km circumference lake just north of Oslo, Norway.

Lying just within the greenbelt around Oslo, the lake is a popular recreational area, used as a camping, picnicking and bathing destination for the residents of Oslo during the summer, as well as a cross-country skiing, skating and ice fishing destination in the winter. The trail around it is used for walking or jogging all year. Every year in August, swimming and running take part in Sognsvann as part of the Oslo Triathlon.

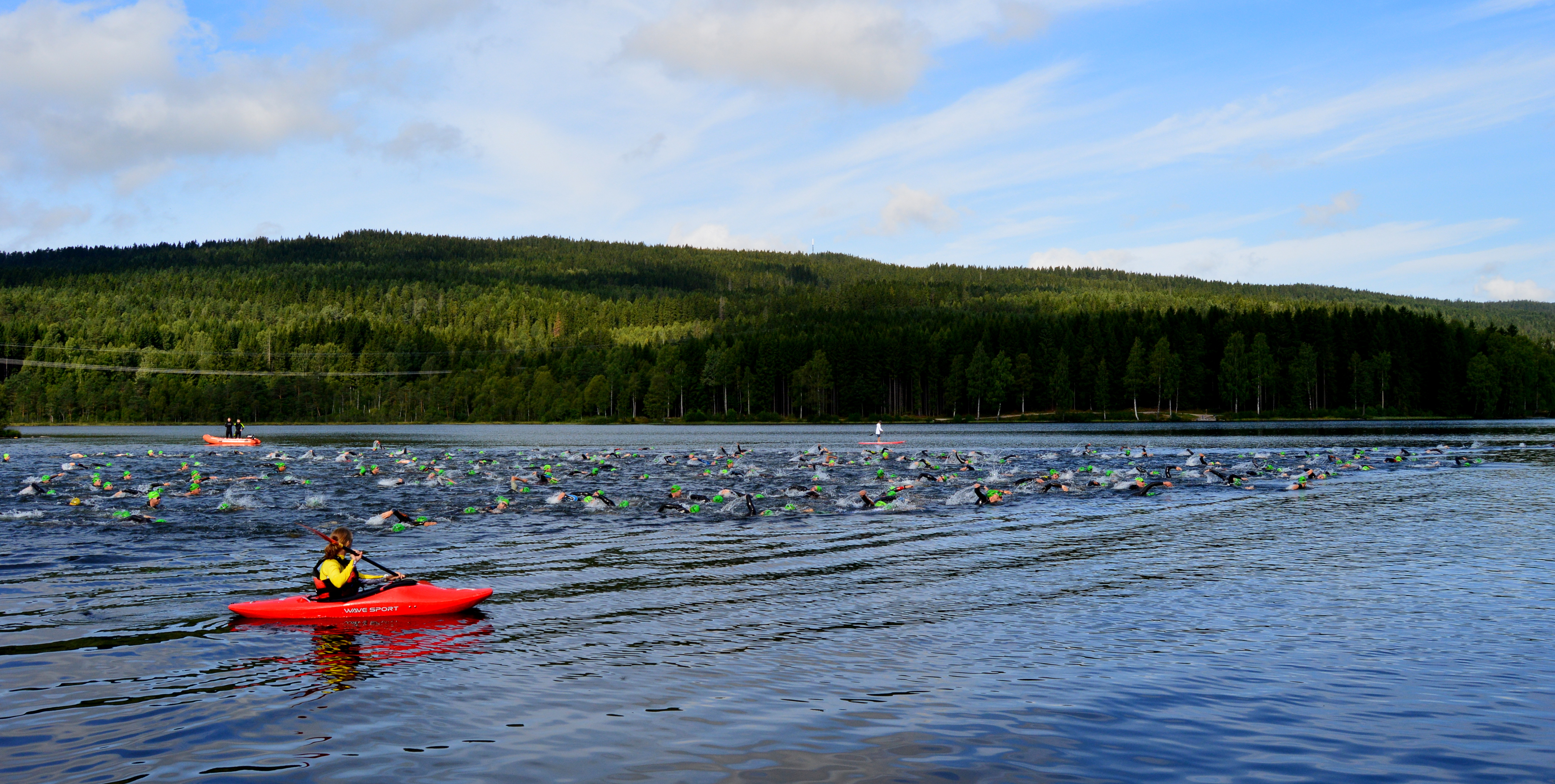
Every August, swimming and running takes part at Songsvann Lake as part of a Triathlon consisting of cycling, running and swimming

Cycling on the footpath around the lake is prohibited; however there is a dedicated cycling trail. Disabled access is good to and around the lake.

Part of the lake's popularity stems from its easy access from Oslo; Sognsvann station, located on the south end of the lake, is the final stop on the Sognsvann line.

Svartkulp ("The black pool"), a small forest lake which is one of three nudist beaches in Oslo, lies a few hundred meters to the east of Sognsvann.

Nedre Blanksjø ("The lower shining lake") is an even smaller lake a few hundred meters to the north of Svartkulp. A pyramid marking the geographical center of Oslo municipality and county is installed on the east side of it, alongside Ankerveien.

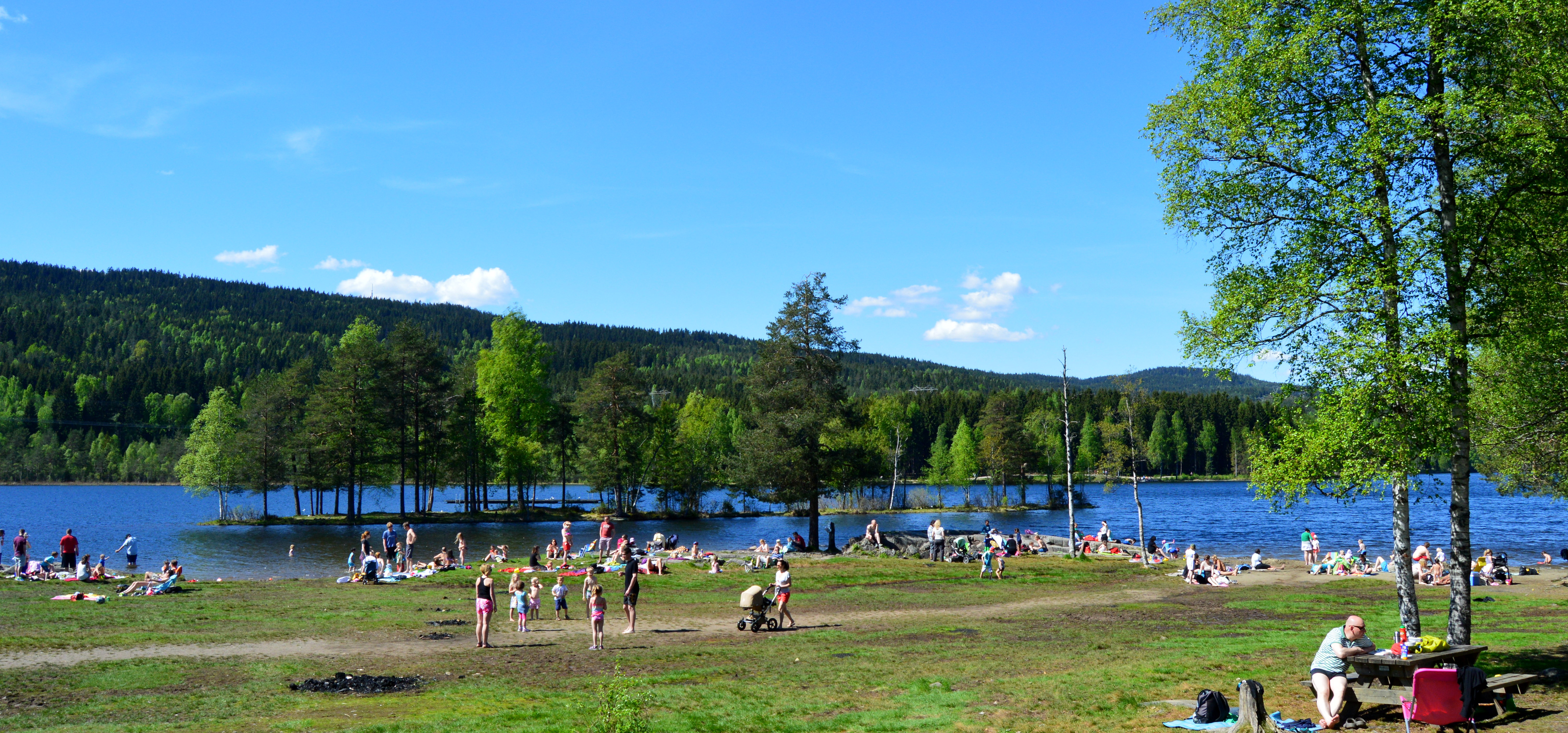
People enjoying a warm weather at Sognsvann Lake

The geographical center of Oslo

== See also ==
- List of lakes of Norway
