= Norwegian School of Sport Sciences =

University

- Norges idrettshøgskole
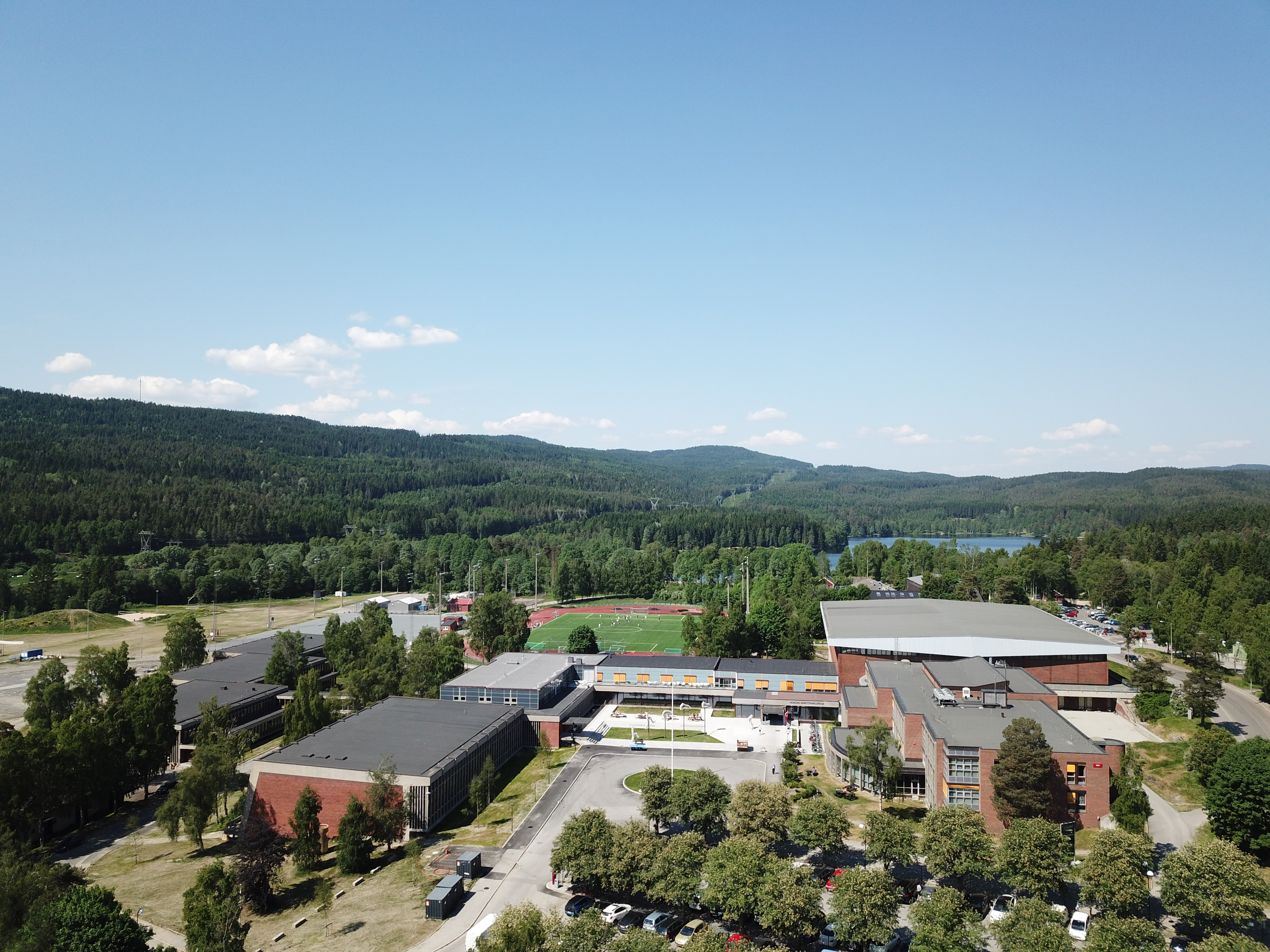
- Campus of the Norwegian School of Sport Sciences
- Motto: Moving Knowledge Forward
- Type: Public University
- Established: 1968; 58 years ago
- Affiliations: Universities Norway
- Rector: Aage Radmann
- Administrative staff: 240
- Students: 2,030
- Location: Oslo, Norway; 59°58′0.48″N 10°43′57.21″E
- Website: www.nih.no

The Norwegian School of Sport Sciences Norwegian: Norges idrettshøgskole or NIH is a state-owned university college with a national directive for education and research in the sport sciences. NIH is located at Sognsvann in Kringsjå, Oslo, Norway.

NIH was established in 1968 and is Norway's premier institution for education and research in sports sciences, physical activity and outdoor life. NIH's mission is to provide higher education, conduct research, and disseminate results within areas related to sport science, public health, outdoor life, movement and physical activity.

Areas of research and study include organized sports, physical education, outdoor activities, and other forms of movement and activity. The institution takes a multidisciplinary approach to teaching and researching physical activity, addressing topics relevant to all the stages of life, including children, teens, adults, seniors, and people with disabilities.

NIH is committed to offering practical and relevant educational programs to students and to making its research available to the public. Multidisciplinary research from NIH demonstrates that physical activity and sports has a significant role in education, learning, and development for both groups and individuals.

The current rector of NIH is Aage Radmann, and the managing director is Unn-Hilde Grasmo-Wendler.

== History ==
In 1870, The National Gymnastics School, was founded under the name "The Central Gymnastics School for Physical Exercise and Weapon Training." Renamed in 1915, it operated as the National Gymnastics School and ceased operations on July 1, 1968.

The Norwegian School of Sport Sciences (NIH) opened on August 12, 1968 and succeeded the National Gymnastics School. At the dedication ceremony, Norway's Prime Minister Per Borten famously inaugurated the school by firing a start pistol.

The first master's degree was awarded in 1973 and the first doctoral degree was successfully completed in 1990.

Thor Volla served as the school's director from 1968 to 1999. The introduction of a new university college law in 1990 led to NIH appointing its first rector, Professor Kari Fasting.

In 2016, NIH ended a long-standing collaboration with the Norwegian Armed Forces. That department relocated to Akershus Fortress and was integrated into the Norwegian Armed Forces.

In 2018, the school celebrated its 50th anniversary.

== Rectors ==
Originally, rectors would serve for a period of six years, for a maximum of two terms. Since 2013, rectors serve for a period of four years, for a maximum of two terms.

- 2025– present: Aage Radmann
- 2017–2025: Lars Tore Ronglan
- 2013–2017: Kari Bø
- 2005–2013: Sigmund Loland
- 1999–2005: Gunnar Breivik
- 1993–1999: Per Wright
- 1990–1993: Kari Fasting

== Directors ==
- 2021–present: Unn-Hilde Grasmo-Wendler
- 2012–2021: Lise Sofie Woie
- 2000–2012: Baard Wist
- 1968–1999: Thor Volla

== Academic Programs ==
As a university college, NIH currently offers 4 bachelor programs, 6 master programs, and a doctoral program. The continuing education programs and online courses support career development and lifelong learning.

Areas of study and specialization include:

- Sports and Social Sciences
- Physical Education and Pedagogy
- Sport Management
- Sports Psychology
- Coaching
- Sports Medicine
- Sports Physiology and Biomechanics
- Sports Physiotherapy
- Health and Physical Activity
- Outdoor Life
- Training and Fitness
- Physical Performance

== Rankings ==
Since 2017, NIH has maintained its position as one of the top three global schools out of 300 for sport science as determined by Shanghai Ranking. The report includes both departments within a university and sports universities.

== Sports Facilities ==
Between 2016 and 2018, the indoor and outdoor facilities at NIH underwent extensive renovations. The facilities are primarily for educational purposes. However, the public can rent spaces, depending on availability. The facilities include:

- Sports hall and courts marked for various ball sports
- Halls for gymnastics, acrobatics, dance, and other physical activities
- 25-meter swimming pool
- Diving towers at 1, 3, and 5 meters
- Fitness center and training studio
- Spinning studio
- Artificial turf field, primarily for football
- A tartan track for track and field events
- A gravel field for javelin, shot put, hammer, and discus
- Tennis courts
- Beach volleyball courts

== Organization ==
NIH has four academic departments:

- Sports Medicine
- Sport and Social Sciences
- Teacher Education and Outdoor Studies
- Physical Performance

== Student Council at NIH ==
The Student Council's primary role is to represent students both internally and externally. By participating in key committees such as the University College Board, the Study Committee, the Equality Committee, and the Learning Environment Committee, the Student Board ensures that students' voices are heard in important decision-making processes.

Additionally, the council works to enhance the student environment by funding events, coordinating student organization activities, and providing information about student life and career opportunities. The council also oversees the system of student representatives, fostering collaboration between students and the school's leadership.

The Student Council is elected annually by all registered students and consists of five members. It is affiliated with the Norwegian Student Organization (NSO) and actively advocates for students' interests on and off campus.

== Literature in Norwegian ==
- 100 år. Den Gymnastiske Centralskole 1870–1915, Statens gymnastikkskole 1915–1968, Norges idrettshøgskole 1968–1970: Referat fra jubileumssymposiet 2.-4. januar 1970. Oslo: NIH. 1970.
- Volla, Thor (1929–2008) (1993). Norges idrettshøgskole: 25-års jubileumsskrift. Oslo: Norges idrettshøgskole. ISBN 8250202961.
