= Nydalen =

Neighborhood in Oslo, Norway

Coordinates: 59°56′55″N 10°46′10″E

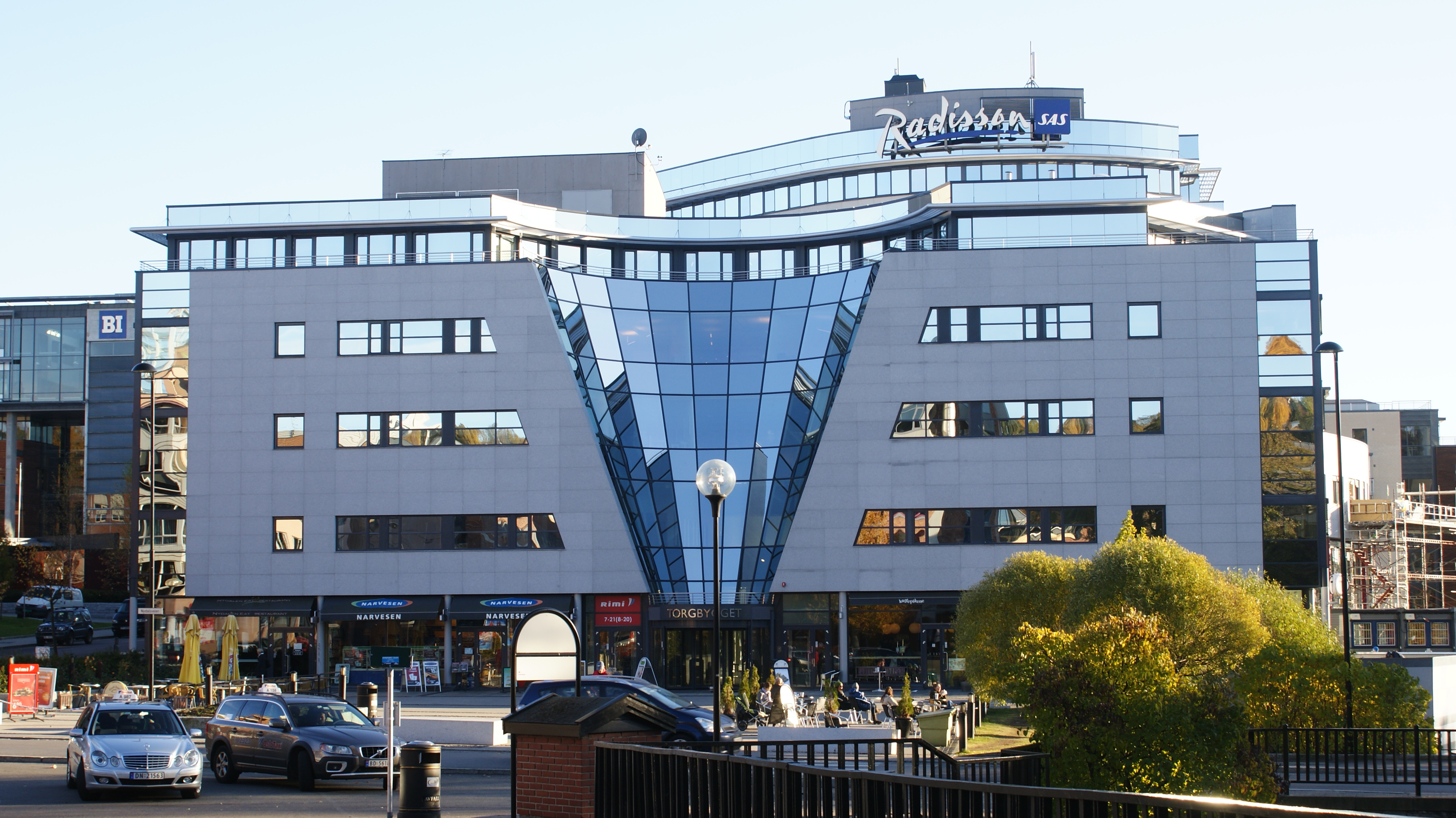
Torgbygget shoppingmall with Radisson BLU behind it.

Nydalen is a neighbourhood in the Nordre Aker borough in northern Oslo, Norway.

== History ==
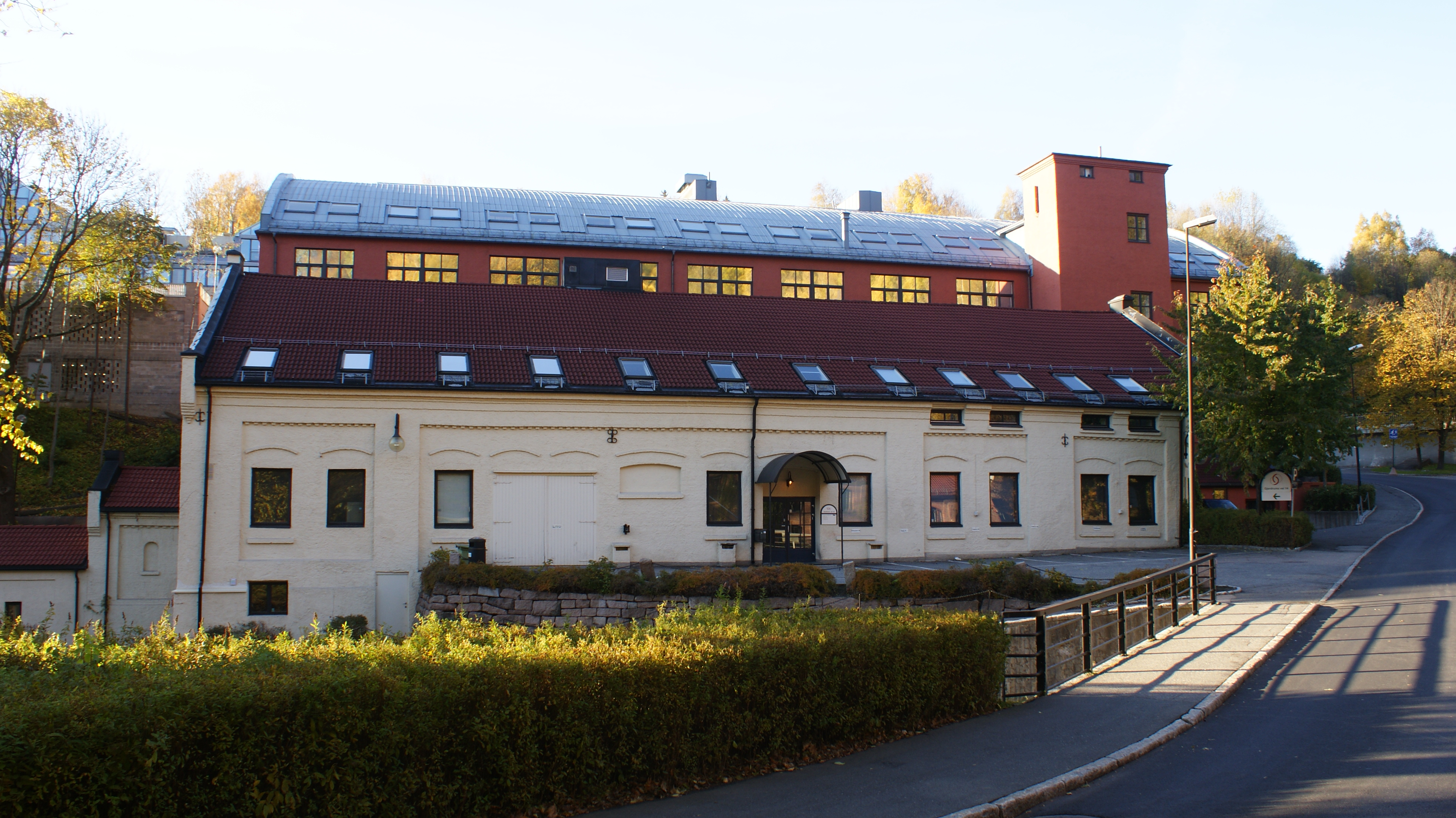
Nydalen industrial park

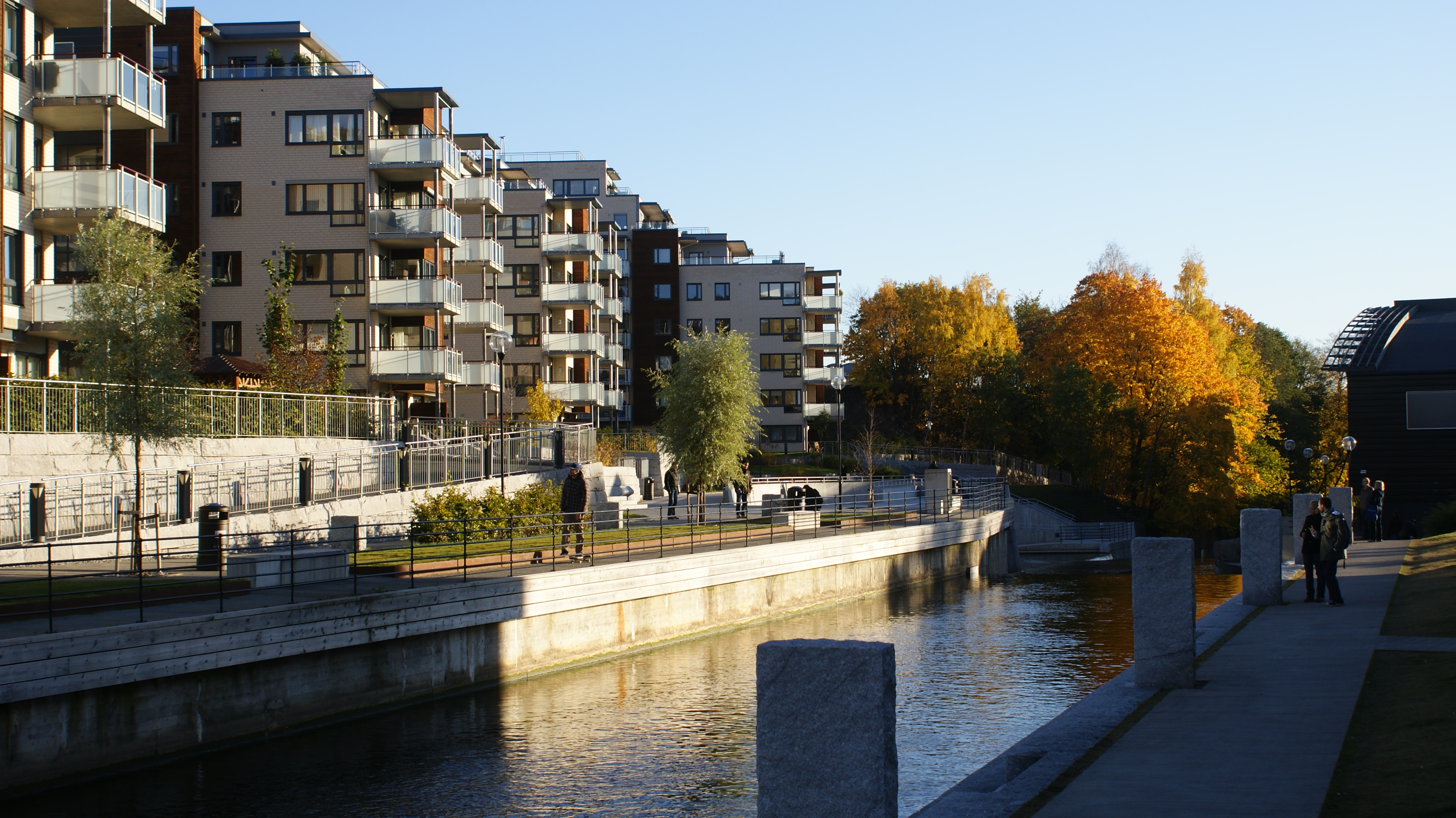
New apartment blocks at the redeveloped banks of Akerselva

In the late 19th century, the banks of the Akerselva River were dotted with various industrial buildings, Nydalen included. However, a transformation soon occurred. Beginning in the 1990s, Nydalen evolved into an urban hub of sorts with modern residential buildings, commercial and service establishments, shopping centres, eateries, and numerous corporate offices.

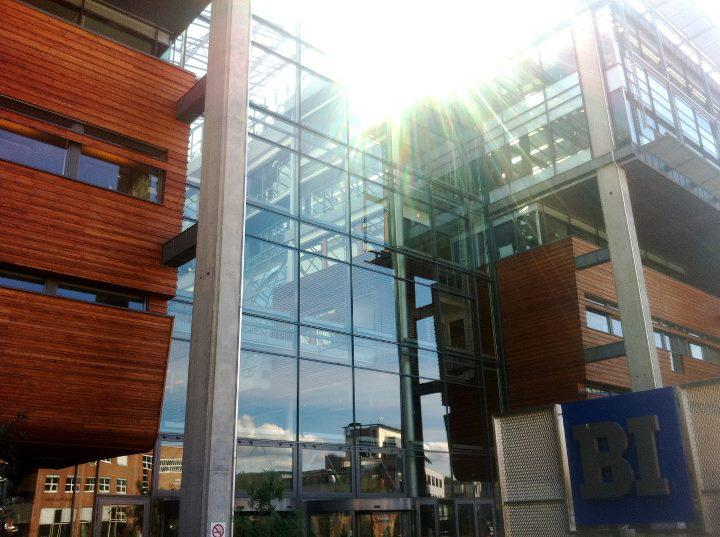
BI Norwegian Business School Nydalen Campus

The relocation of the BI Norwegian Business School to the area in 2004 further boosted the area's development. In 2003, a new subway station, Nydalen (station) opened in Nydalen. Many people have moved into new residential buildings in the late 2000s. Today, the area is a lively, trendy and well-connected neighbourhood with the Akerselva River flowing through its heart.

== Geography ==
The neighbourhood is located on both sides of the Akerselva river in the southeastern part of Nordre Aker, to the south of Kjelsås, to the west of Grefsen, and to the north of the Sagene borough.

== The name ==
Nydalen is a shortened form for *Nygårdsdalen 'the dale/valley belonging to the farm Nygård'. The name of the old farm Nygård (Norse Nýgarðr) is a compound of nýr 'new' and garðr m 'farm'. The farm is first mentioned in 1578.
