= Sogn, Oslo =

Former district of Oslo, Norway

Sogn was a district of the city of Oslo, Norway until January 1, 2004, when it became part of the Nordre Aker district.

The name was chosen in 1972, as the city council decided to divide Oslo into 34 districts. Each district had 13 members of a district committee, elected by the city council for four years. The district committee decided on the local name Sogn.

Sogn and Berg are probably the oldest known farm estates in the district. Hovedbølet on Berg farm estate is placed outside of the district limits today. Sognsvann gave its name to the farm estate Sogn, which was divided into three Sogngårder: Østre Sogn, Vestre Sogn and Lille Sogn (Nordberg). Known names were taken by other areas or institutions: Nordberg (parish), Tåsen school district / voting district, and Korsvoll school district / voting district. Berg-area is divided by its district border to the west, with Berg school (and farm estate) just outside its district border.
