= Tåsen =

Neighborhood in Oslo, Norway

Coordinates: 59°57′09″N 10°45′01″E

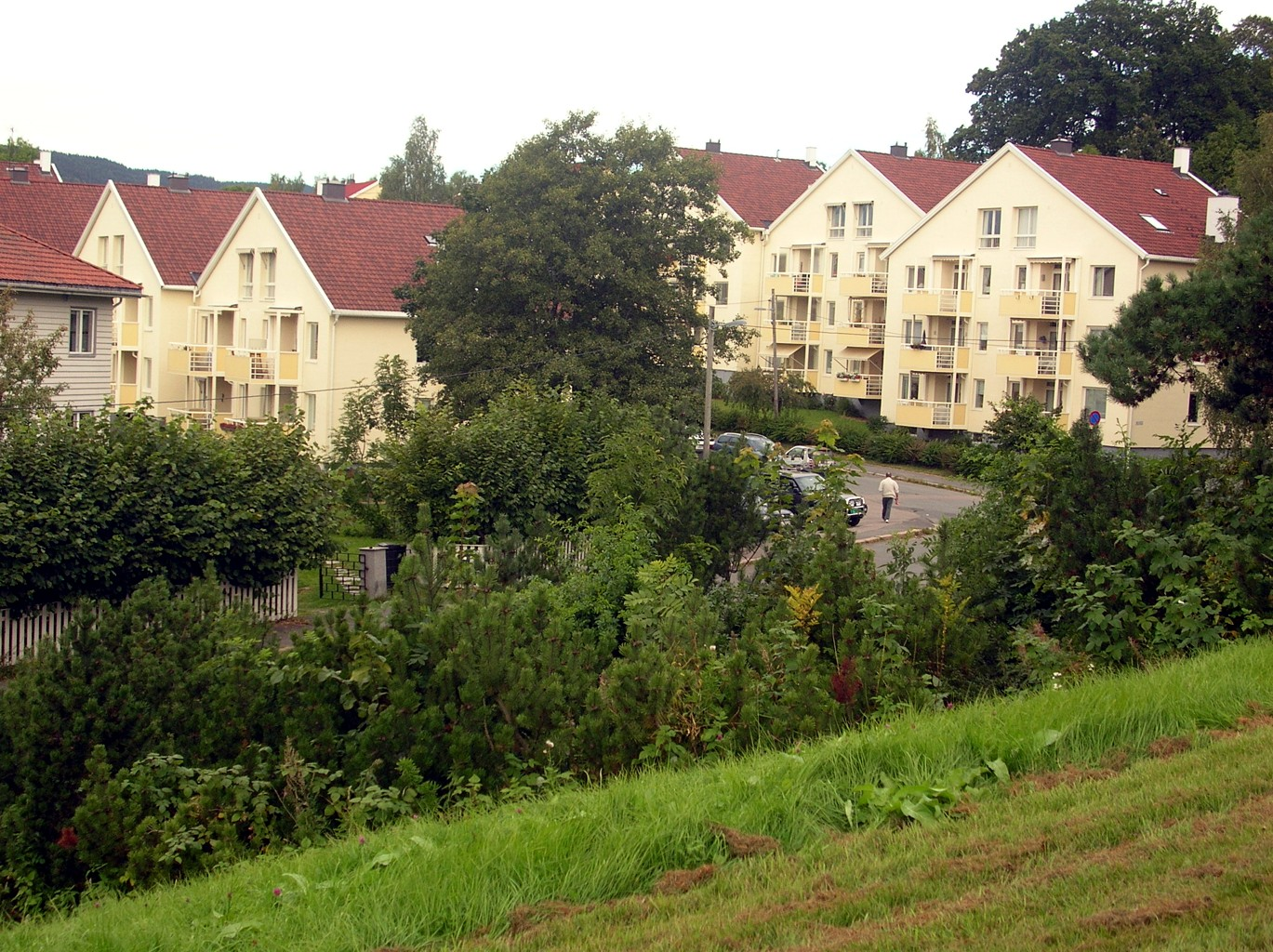
Tåsen

Tåsen is a neighborhood in the west side of Oslo, Norway, approx. four 4 kilometres (2.5 mi) north of the city centre. The name originates from the Norse name Tásvin. The Tåsen station serves the area.
