= Vestgrensa (station) =

Former Oslo metro station

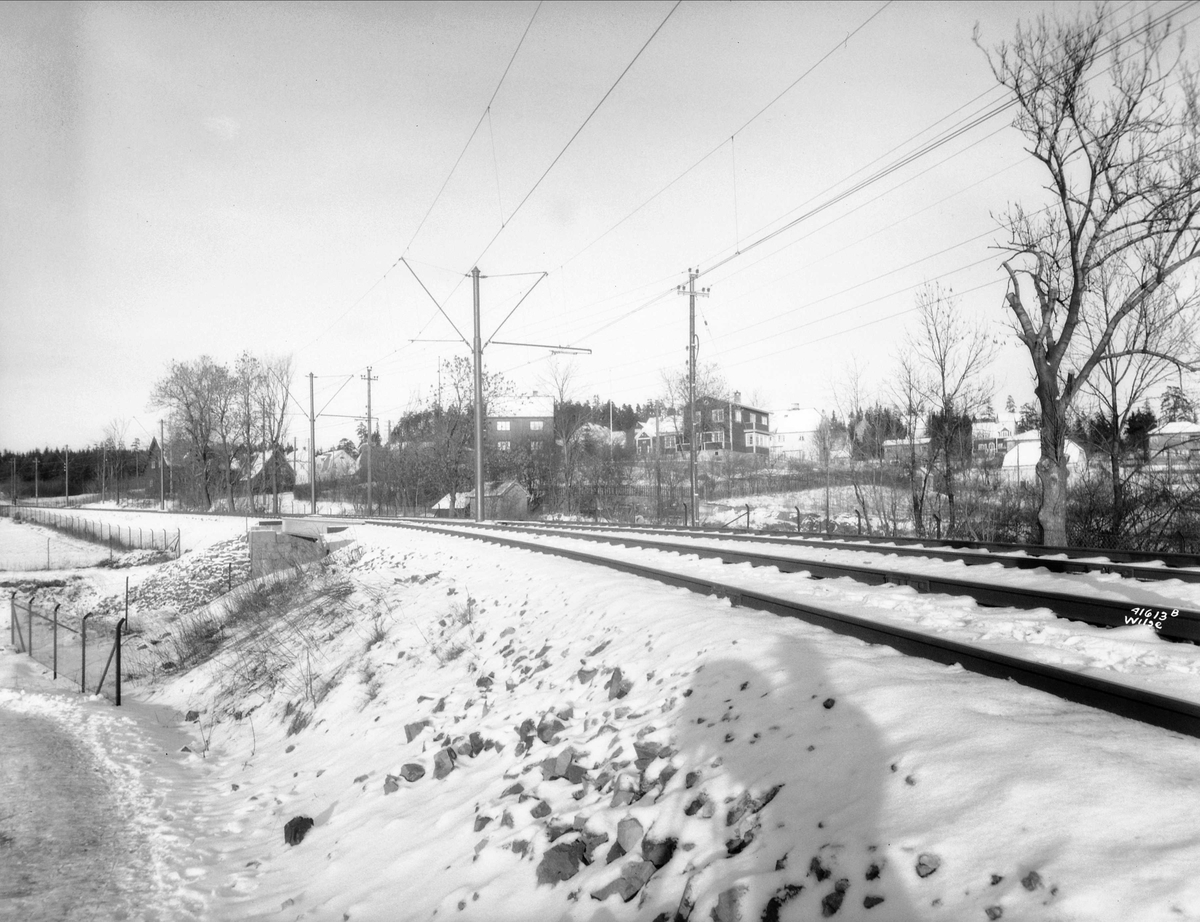
- 1935 photo of the Sognsvann Line near Vestgrensa, taken by Anders Beer Wilse shortly after the opening of the line

General information
- Location: Ullevål Hageby, Nordre Aker, Aker (1934–1948); Oslo (1948–); Norway
- Coordinates: 59°56′40″N 10°43′30″E
- Line: Sognsvann Line

Construction
- Structure type: Elevated

History
- Opened: 10 October 1934
- Closed: 22 August 1999
Location

Vestgrensa (originally Ullevål Haveby) was a light rail station on the Sognsvann Line of the Oslo Metro in Norway. It opened on 10 October 1934, and was located between Blindern and Ullevål stadion stations. In the early 1990s, when the Sognsvann Line was upgraded from light rail to full metro standard, the station was reconstructed. It was closed on 22 August 1999, when it was replaced by the new station Forskningsparken.

== History ==
Ullevål Haveby station opened on 10 October 1934, when Akersbanerne had built a light rail line from Majorstuen to Sognsvann. The line was double-tracked from Majorstuen to Korsvoll (now Østhorn), and single-tracked from there to Sognsvann. On 21 February 1939, the section from Korsvoll to Sognsvann was upgraded to double tracks, and the station Korsvoll had its name changed to Østhorn. Ullevål Haveby station changed also name, to Vestgrensa, to avoid confusion with the northbound Ullevål stadion station.

Vestgrensa was part of Holmenkolbanen's operating network until 1975, when the municipality of Oslo bought all the company's stock. In the early 1990s, the stations on the Sognsvann Line were upgraded to metro standard, which involved a heightening and lengthening of the platforms, and installation of a third rail power supply and a new signaling system. The electrified third rail made it impossible for passengers to cross at track level, and under- or overpasses had to be built at all stations.

In 1992, the transport authorities of Oslo decided to close Nordberg and Frøen stations, (Note: Frøen Station was only closed on the Sognsvann Line, and is still served by the Holmenkollen Line.) on the grounds that these stations were too expensive to maintain. The platforms at Vestgrensa were moved a few metres to adjust to the metro trains. Seven years later, on 22 August 1999, Vestgrensa was closed and replaced with the newly opened Forskningsparken Station.

== Location ==
Vestgrensa was located in the Ullevål Hageby neighbourhood in Oslo, between the Oslo Innovation Center (Norwegian: Forskningsparken) and the football stadium Ullevaal Stadion. The station was positioned on an elevated embankment, some metres from a bridge over a pedestrian walkway also named Vestgrensa. The station served the residential area in Ullevål Hageby, as well as the University of Oslo at Blindern. A scout hut was in many years located close to the station.

== Notes ==
External image
- Pictures at the Norwegian Railway Club

== Bibliography ==
- Andersen, Bjørn (1993). Holmenkollbanen: Kort historikk fra 1898 til 1993 (in Norwegian). Oslo: Lokaltrafikkhistorisk forening. ISBN 82-91223-01-7.
- Arntzen, Jon G.; Hansen, Stig A. (2009). OSLO 1925–45 (in Norwegian). Oslo: Kom forlag. ISBN 978-82-92496-80-0.
- Aspenberg, Nils C. (1995). Neste stopp Makrellbakken: Historien om Røabanen (in Norwegian). Oslo: Baneforlaget. ISBN 82-91448-18-3.
- Hartmann, Eivind; Mangset, Øistein (2001). Neste Stopp! : Verneplan for bygninger (in Norwegian). Oslo: Baneforlaget. ISBN 82-91448-17-5.
- Nilsen, Knut A. (1998). Nordmarkstrikken: Holmenkollbanen gjennom 100 år (in Norwegian). Oslo: Aschehoug. ISBN 82-03-22262-5.
