= Forskningsparken station =

Oslo metro station

Forskningsparken
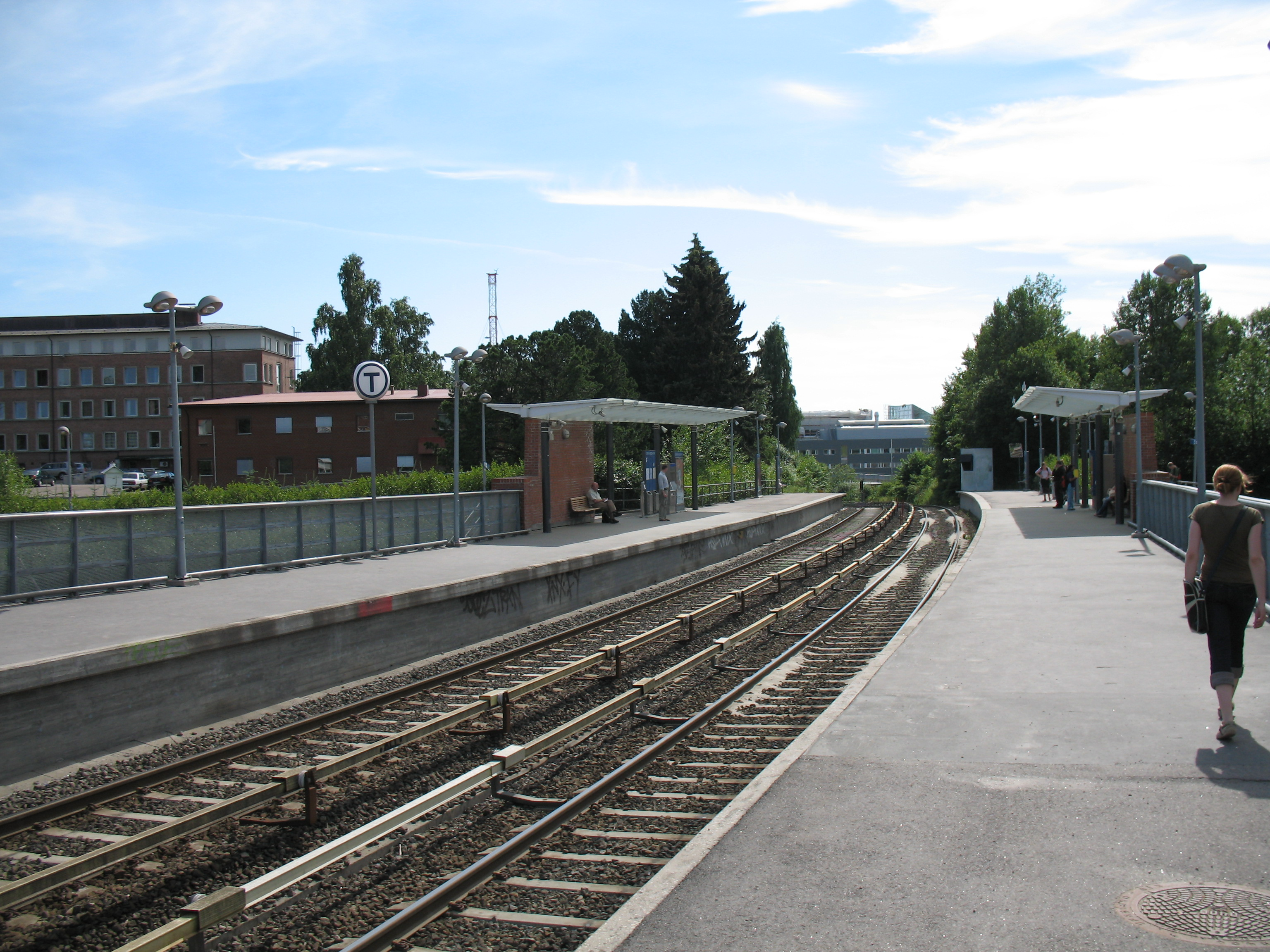

General information
- Location: Blindern, Nordre Aker, Oslo; Norway
- Coordinates: 59°56′37″N 10°43′16″E
- Owner: Sporveien
- Operator: Sporveien T-banen
- Line: Sognsvann Line
- Distance: 4.6 km (2.9 mi) from Stortinget
- Connections: Tram:

Construction
- Structure type: At-grade
- Accessible: Yes

History
- Opened: 22 August 1999

Services
Preceding station	Oslo Metro	Following station
Ullevål stadion towards Vestli	Line 4	Blindern towards Bergkrystallen
Ullevål stadion towards Sognsvann	Line 5	Blindern towards Vestli
Preceding station	Trams in Oslo	Following station
Gaustadalléen towards Rikshospitalet	Line 17	Universitetet Blindern towards Grefsen
Gaustadalléen towards Rikshospitalet	Line 18	Universitetet Blindern towards Grefsen
Location

Forskningsparken is a rapid transit station on the Sognsvann Line of the Oslo Metro. It also serves as a light rail station for the Ullevål Hageby Line of the Oslo Tramway. It is located at the north of the Blindern campus of the University of Oslo in the Nordre Aker borough of Oslo, Norway. The decision to build the station was made in 1998, and it opened in 1999, replacing the former station Vestgrensa, and allowed interchange between the metro and the tramway. The Ullevål Hageby Line was at the same time extended to serve the new Rikshospitalet. Forskningsparken is served by lines 4 and 5 of the metro, each operating every 15 minutes and providing services along both the Sognsvann Line and the Ring Line. Lines 17 and 18 of the tramway serve Forskningsparken, operating to Rikshospitalet and the city center.

== History ==
Vestgrensa had served the area now served by Forskingsparken since the opening of the Sognsvann Line on 10 October 1934. In 1991, the Norwegian Parliament decided to build a new facility for Rikshospitalet at Gaustad, and to serve the hospital by an extension of the Ullevål Hageby Line. Gaustad Station on the Holmenkoll Line of the rapid transit is located within a few hundred meters of the hospital. Vestgrensa was deemed too far away by planners, and a transfer station would need to be established between the light rail and the Sognsvann Line. At first, Blindern was considered, but instead it was later decided that there should be an all-new station.

By 1994, the tram route to the new hospital appeared to have political support, but by 1996 local politicians instead wanted to use Gaustad Station and buses to serve the hospital. There also arose a disagreement between the city and the state as to who should be paying for the light rail line, should it should be built. Not until 1998 were the necessary political agreements in place to allow construction to start. The new light rail started services on 1 June 1999, and the rapid transit station opened on 22 August. With the opening, line 4 was extended from Blindern, via Forskningsarken, to Ullevål stadion. There were complaints from local residents that the increased traffic on the line was causing too much noise, and neighbors demanded that noise shields be built. On 20 August 2003, the Ring Line of the metro opened, and line 4 started to also serve Nydalen and Storo.

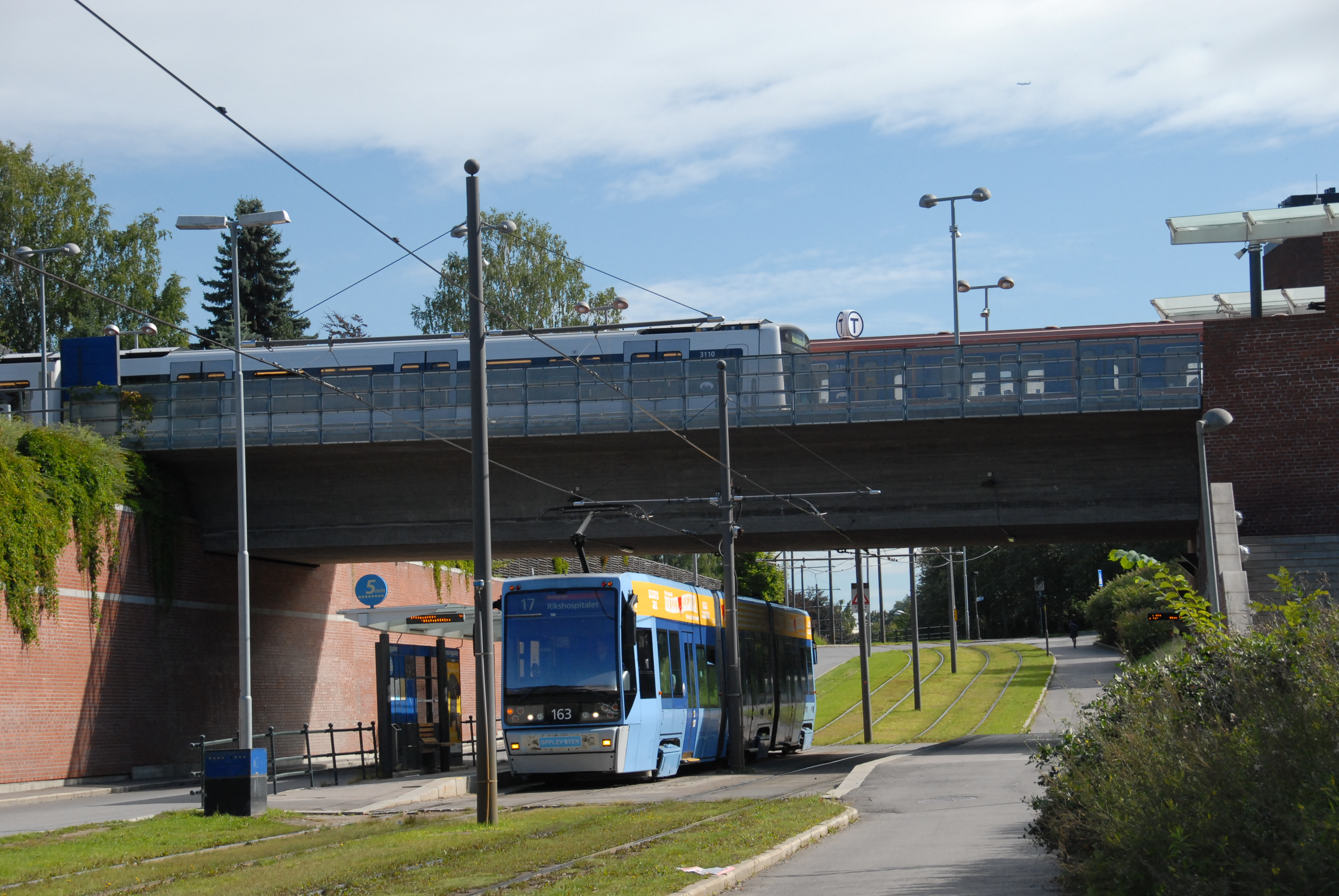
The tram station located under the T-bane station

== Facilities ==
The station is named after the Oslo Innovation Center (Norwegian: Forskningsparken). It serves the northern side of the University of Oslo campus at Blindern. The campus is also served by the light rail station Universitetet Blindern and the rapid transit station Blindern. To the north of the station is Rikshospitalet. The light rail offers transfer service to the hospital, but it is still within walking distance from Forskningsparken. The rapid transit line runs on an elevated section. The light rail station is located directly below the station, on Problemveien. Designed by the architect firm Arkitektskap, both stations are open to the air and have sheds in both directions.

== Service ==
The rapid transit station is served by lines 4 and 5 of the Oslo Metro. Each line has a 15-minute headway during the day, with reduced frequency in the late evenings. Heading north, line 5 Sognsvann serves the Sognsvann Line, that includes many student housing areas. Line 4 serves Vestli and line 5 Ringen serves the Ring Line, with line 5 Ringen making a full loop. All three lines head south into the Common Tunnel that serves the city center. Travel time to Stortinget is 8 minutes, while it is 5 minutes to Nydalen and 9 minutes to Sognsvann. Forskningsparken is 4.6 kilometres (2.9 mi) from Stortinget. The metro is operated by Oslo T-banedrift on contract with Ruter.

The light rail station is served by lines 17 and 18 of the Oslo Tramway. Each line has a ten-minute headway during the day, with half the frequency during evenings and in the weekends. Travel time to Rikshospitalet is 2 minutes, while it is 14 minutes to Stortorvet. The service is provided using SL95 (& SL18) trams operated by Oslo Sporvognsdrift on contract with Ruter. Forskningsparken is one of eight transfer points between the tramway and rapid transit systems.
