= Sinsen station =

Oslo metro station

Sinsen
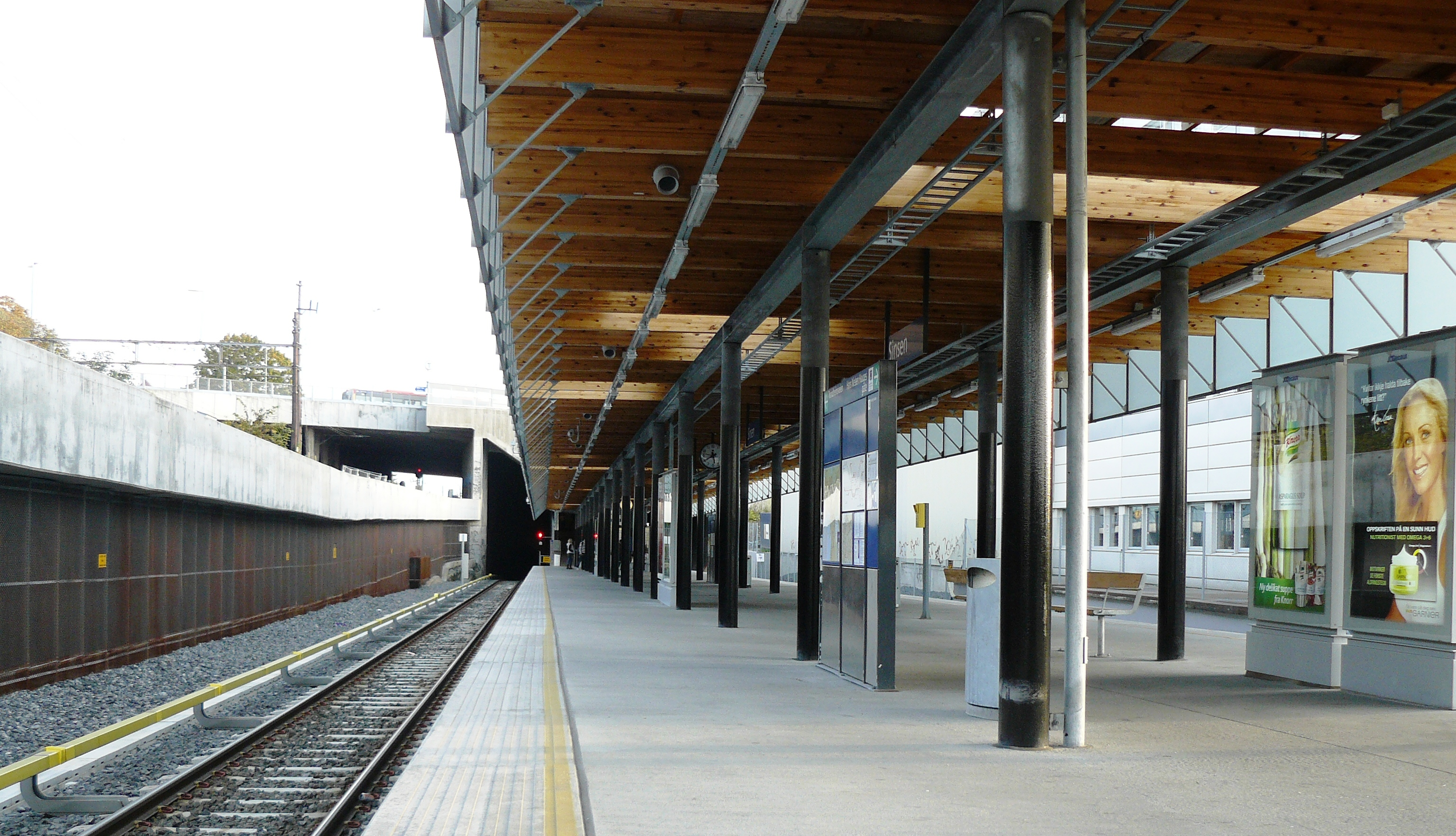

General information
- Location: Sinsen, Torshov, Oslo; Norway
- Coordinates: 59°56′14″N 10°46′55″E
- Owner: Sporveien
- Operator: Sporveien T-banen
- Line: Ring Line
- Connections: Tram: Bus service: 23 Lysaker–Simensbråten; 24 Brynseng–Fornebu; 31 Grorud T-Tonsenhagen-Fornebu-Snarøya; 33 Ellingsrudåsen–Filipstad; 58 Nydalen–Tveita

Construction
- Structure type: At-grade
- Accessible: Yes

History
- Opened: 20 August 2006

Services
Preceding station	Oslo Metro	Following station
Storo towards Bergkrystallen	Line 4	Løren towards Vestli
Storo towards Sognsvann	Line 5	Carl Berners plass towards Vestli
Preceding station	Trams in Oslo	Following station
Sinsenterrassen towards Rikshospitalet	Line 17	Grefsen Terminus
Track layout
Location

Sinsen is a rapid transit station on the Ring Line of the Oslo Metro. It is located at Sinsen in the Sagene borough of Oslo, Norway. Next to the station is the tram station Sinsenkrysset, that has been part of the Sinsen Line of the Oslo Tramway since 1939. The station opened on 20 August 2006, as part of the first section of the Ring Line. The station is served by line 4 and 5 of the metro, as well as several local bus services. Sinsen is a mixed residential and commercial area.

== History ==
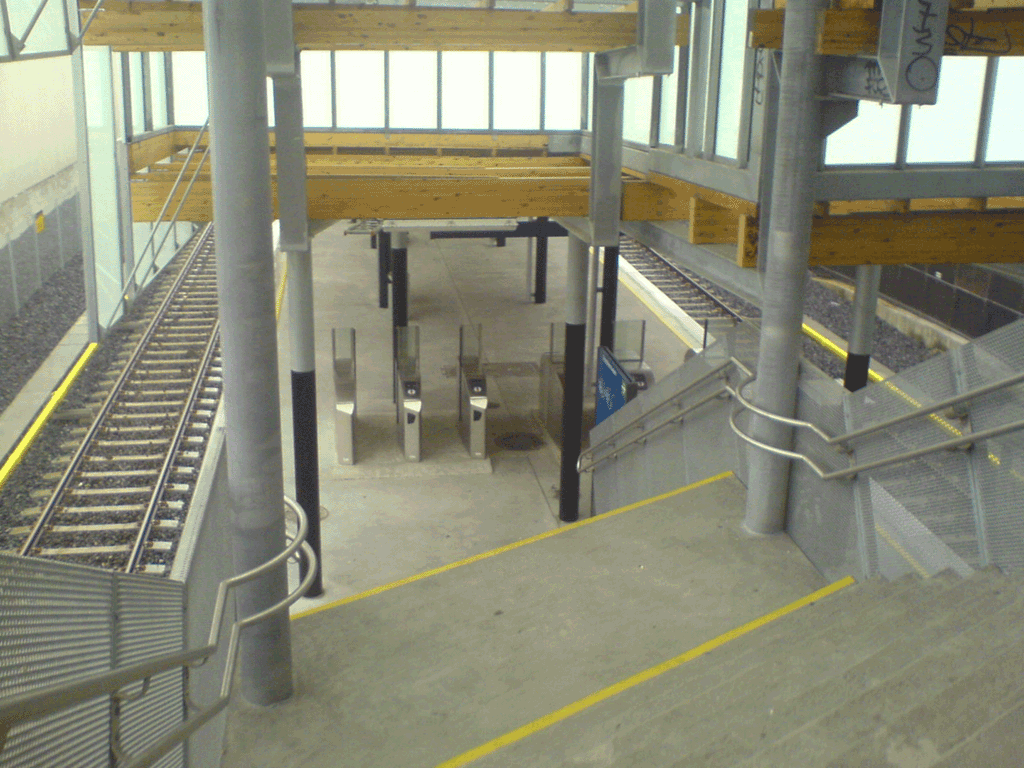
Stairs to the island platform from the Trondheimsveien entrance

Storo opened as a tram station as part of the extension of the Sinsen Line to Grefsen in 1939. The tram station was built adjacent to the Sinsen Interchange, between Ring 3 and National Road 4. In 1992, the Sinsen Line was moved redirected to go outside the interchange.

The process of establishing a Ring Line to serve the northern parts of Oslo started in the late 1980s. The plans were passed by the city council in 1997, and financing was secured in 2000 through Oslo Package 2. Construction started in June 2000, and the first section to Nydalen and Storo opened on 20 August 2003. The ring was completed and Sinsen opened on 20 August 2006. The station is owned by Sporveien.

== Facilities ==
The rapid transit station was designed by architects Jensen & Skodvin Architects, and is visually and structurally very similar to Storo. It features a center platform, a roof, and incorporates wood, steel and concrete as construction materials. To the south, the station is located just outside the tunnel that connects the Ring Line to the Grorud Line. To the north, the line runs parallel to the mainline Gjøvik Line. Sinsen is located just beside the Sinsen Interchange, in a mixed residential and commercial area.

== Service ==
Line 4 and 5 of the Oslo Metro operate to Sinsen, with a 15-minute headway. The line operate clockwise through the eastern part of town into the Common Tunnel towards Vestli (4), Sognsvann (5), while it operates counterclockwise via the western part into the Common Tunnel towards Bergkrystallen (4) and Vestli (5). Travel time from Sinsen to Stortinget is 9 minutes clockwise and 16 minutes counterclockwise. The service is operated by Oslo T-banedrift on contract with Ruter.

The tram station is served by line 17 of the Oslo Tramway. It operates on a ten-minute headway to the city center. Travel time to Jernbanetorget is 13 minutes. Northwards, the line continues to the final station, Grefsen. While the tram and rapid transit stations are within walking distance of each other, they are not marked as transfer stations on the schedules. The trams are operated by Oslo Sporvognsdrift on contract with Ruter.

The station serves several bus routes. Lines 23 and 24 along Ring 3 from Lysaker to Simensbråten, and Brynseng to Fornebu stop at Sinsen. Line 31 runs via Sinsen from Grorud-Tonsenhagen to Fornebu-Snarøya, as does line 33 from Ellingsrudåsen to Filipstad, and line 58 from Tveita to Nydalen.
