= Storo station =

Oslo metro station

Storo
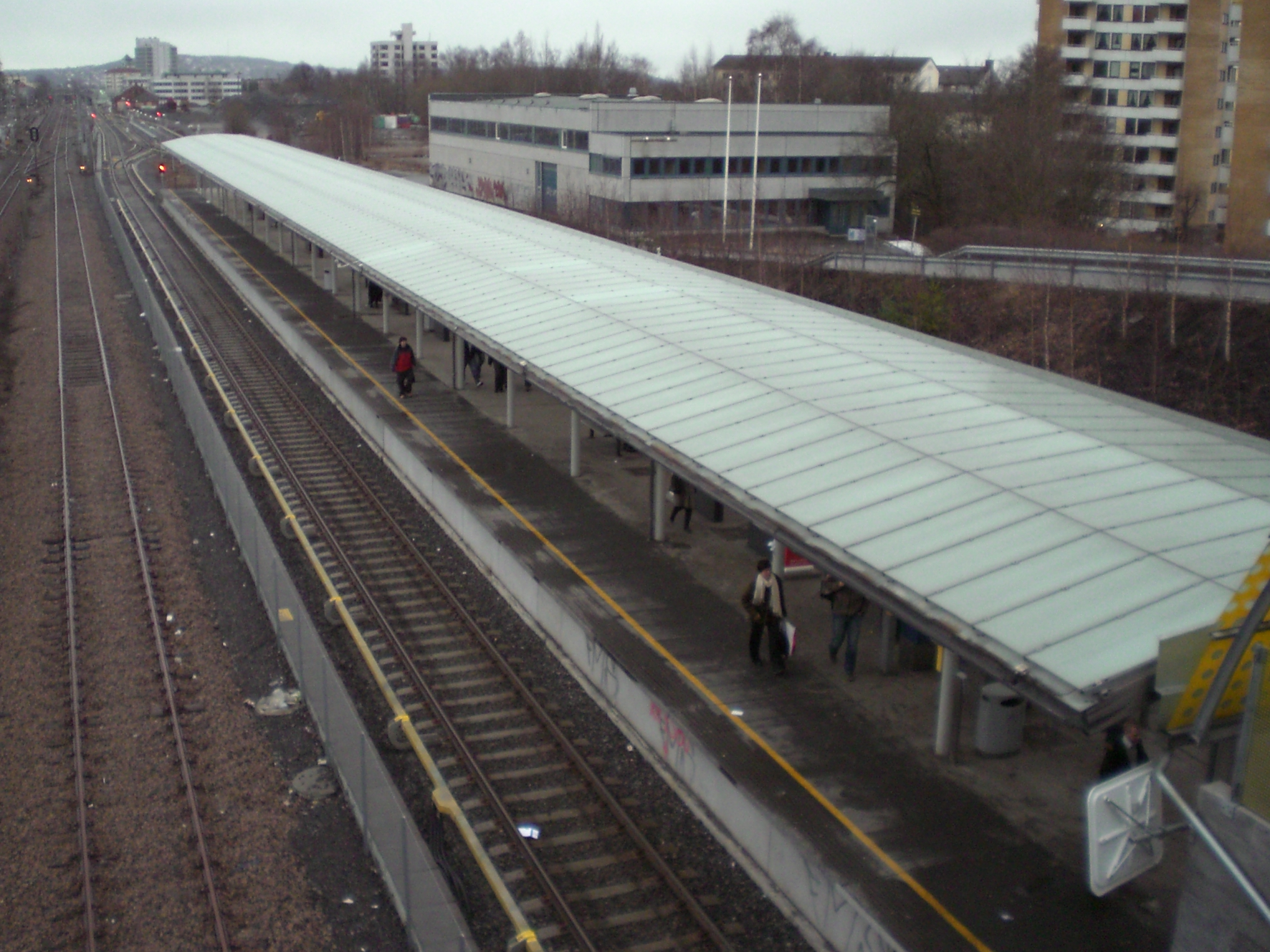

General information
- Location: Storo, Oslo; Norway
- Coordinates: 59°56′39″N 10°46′43″E
- Owner: Sporveien
- Operator: Sporveien T-banen
- Line: Ring Line
- Connections: Tram: Bus service: 23 Lysaker–Simensbråten; 24 Brynseng–Fornebu; 56 Solemskogen–Nydalen; 56B Grefsenkollen–Nydalen; 58 Nydalen–Tveita

Construction
- Structure type: At-grade
- Accessible: Yes

History
- Opened: 22 August 2003

Services
Preceding station	Oslo Metro	Following station
Nydalen towards Vestli	Line 4 Ring Line	Sinsen towards Bergkrystallen
Nydalen towards Sognsvann	Line 5 Ring Line	Sinsen towards Vestli
Preceding station	Trams in Oslo	Following station
Grefsenveien towards Majorstuen	Line 11	Disen towards Kjelsås
Grefsenveien towards Majorstuen	Line 12	Disen towards Kjelsås
Grefsenveien towards Rikshospitalet	Line 18	Grefsen Terminus
Track layout
Location

Storo is a rapid transit station on the Ring Line of the Oslo Metro, and a tram station on the Grünerløkka–Torshov Line of the Oslo Tramway. It is located at Storo in the Nordre Aker borough of Oslo, Norway. The tram station opened on 28 November 1902, and the rapid transit station on 20 August 2003. Metro lines 4 and 5 run to the station. The tram station serves lines 11, 12 and 18. The station is within walking distance of Grefsen Station on the Gjøvik Line. The station also functions as a bus hub, being located along Ring 3. Storo is a mixed commercial and residential area, and a shopping center is located just north of the subway station.

== History ==
Storo opened as a tram station as the terminus of the Grünerløkka–Torshov Line on 28 November 1902. The line was extended northwards as the Kjelsås Line to Kjelsås on 25 September 1934, and south-eastwards as an extension of the Sinsen Line in 1939.

The process of establishing a Ring Line to serve the northern parts of Oslo started in the late 1980s. The plans were passed by the city council in 1997, and financing was secured in 2000 through Oslo Package 2. Construction started in June 2000, and the station building and platforms were completed in December 2002. Until the opening, work continued on amenities and the tracks. Storo Station was opened on 20 August 2003, at the same time as Nydalen.

== Facilities ==
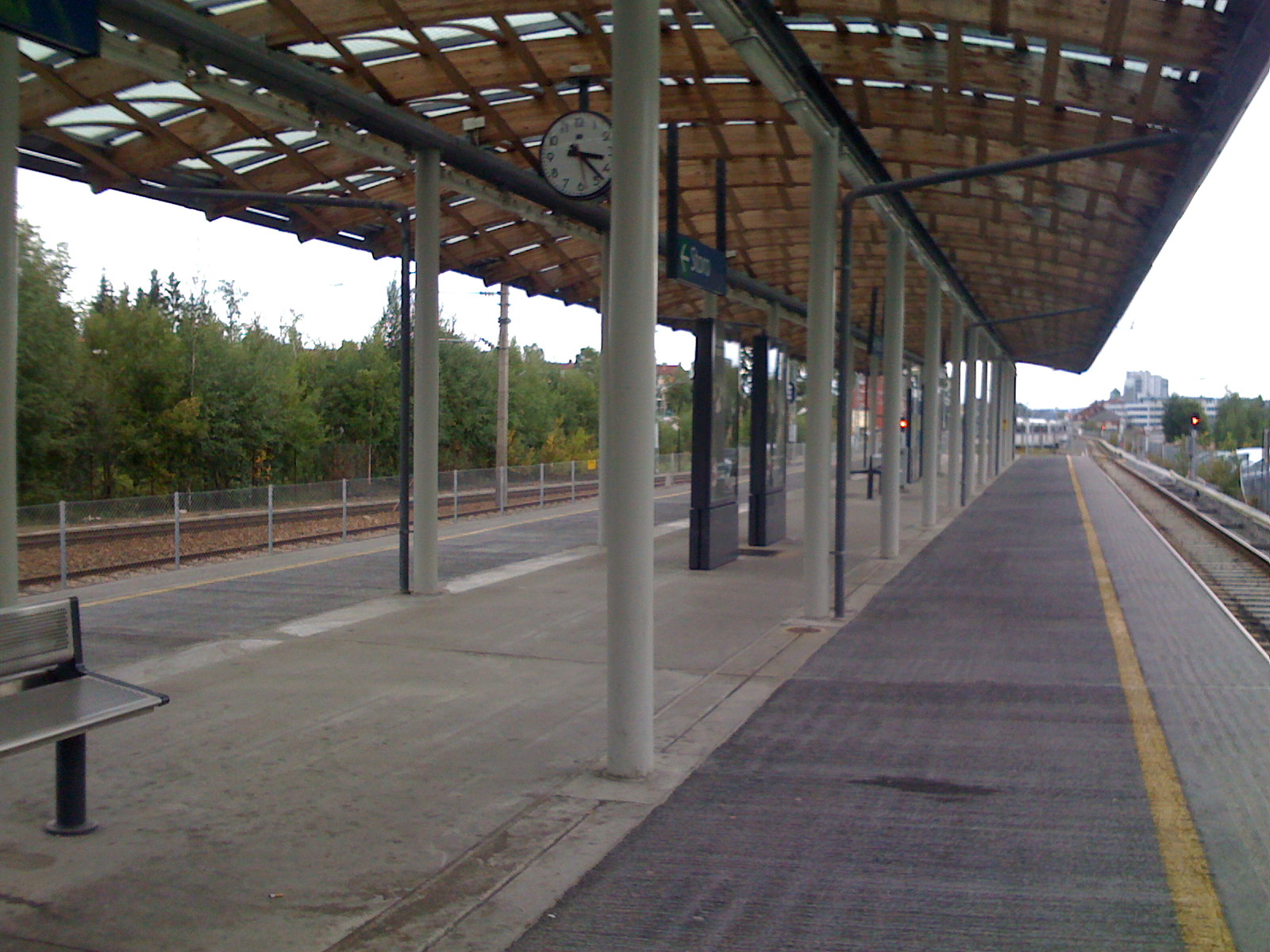
The platform

The rapid transit station was designed by architects Jensen & Skodvin Architects, and is visually and structurally very similar to the Sinsen Station, also one of their projects. It features a center platform with a roof, and uses wood, steel and concrete. The station is located just outside the tunnel that runs all the way to the connection with the Sognsvann Line. South of Storo, the metro tracks run parallel with the Gjøvik Line. The station is owned by Kollektivtransportproduksjon.

On the other side of the tracks, about 200 metres (660 ft) away is Grefsen Station on the Gjøvik Line. It is served every 40 minutes by NSB Gjøvikbanen services of the Oslo Commuter Rail towards Nittedal, Hadeland and Gjøvik. The Norwegian National Rail Administration is planning to move the station platform to allow direct transfer.

Storo is a mixed residential and commercial area. It has traditionally been easily accessible by car due to being located along Ring 3, a major highway. The shopping center Storo Storsenter is located just beside the station. Following the opening of the rapid transit station, a new housing complex was built on the west side of the station, on a former freight yard owned by the Norwegian State Railways. The first stage with 260 apartments was finished in 2006; when finished, it will feature 900 apartments. The area, named Stasjonsbyen ("the Station City") was developed by ROM Eiendom. Ridership at Storo increased from 2,060 per day to 3,630 per day from 2003 to 2007.

== Service ==
As of 2021, lines 4 and 5 of the Oslo Metro operate to Storo, each with a 15-minute headway. Line 4 connects the Grorud Line in the northeast with the Lambertseter Line in the southeast via the Løren Line and Ring Line. Line 5 connects the Grorud Line with the Sognsvann Line in the northwest, and travels one full loop around the Ring Line en route.

The tram station is served by lines 11, 12 and 18 of the Oslo Tramway. Southbound, all three follow the Grünerløkka–Torshov Line to the city center. Travel time to Jernbanetorget is 15 minutes. Northwards, line 11 and 12 continue on the Kjelsås Line. Line 18 branches off and heads one stop to Grefsen. The tram service is provided by Oslo Sporvognsdrift on contract with Ruter. Storo is one of eight transfer points between the tramway and rapid transit systems.

The station serves several bus routes. Lines 23 and 24 along Ring 3 from Lysaker to Simensbråten, and Brynseng to Fornebu stops at Storo. So does line 56 from Nydalen to Solemskogen. Most of the buses stop at a stop located on the motorway Ring 3.
