= Ullevål stadion station =

Oslo metro station

Ullevål stadion
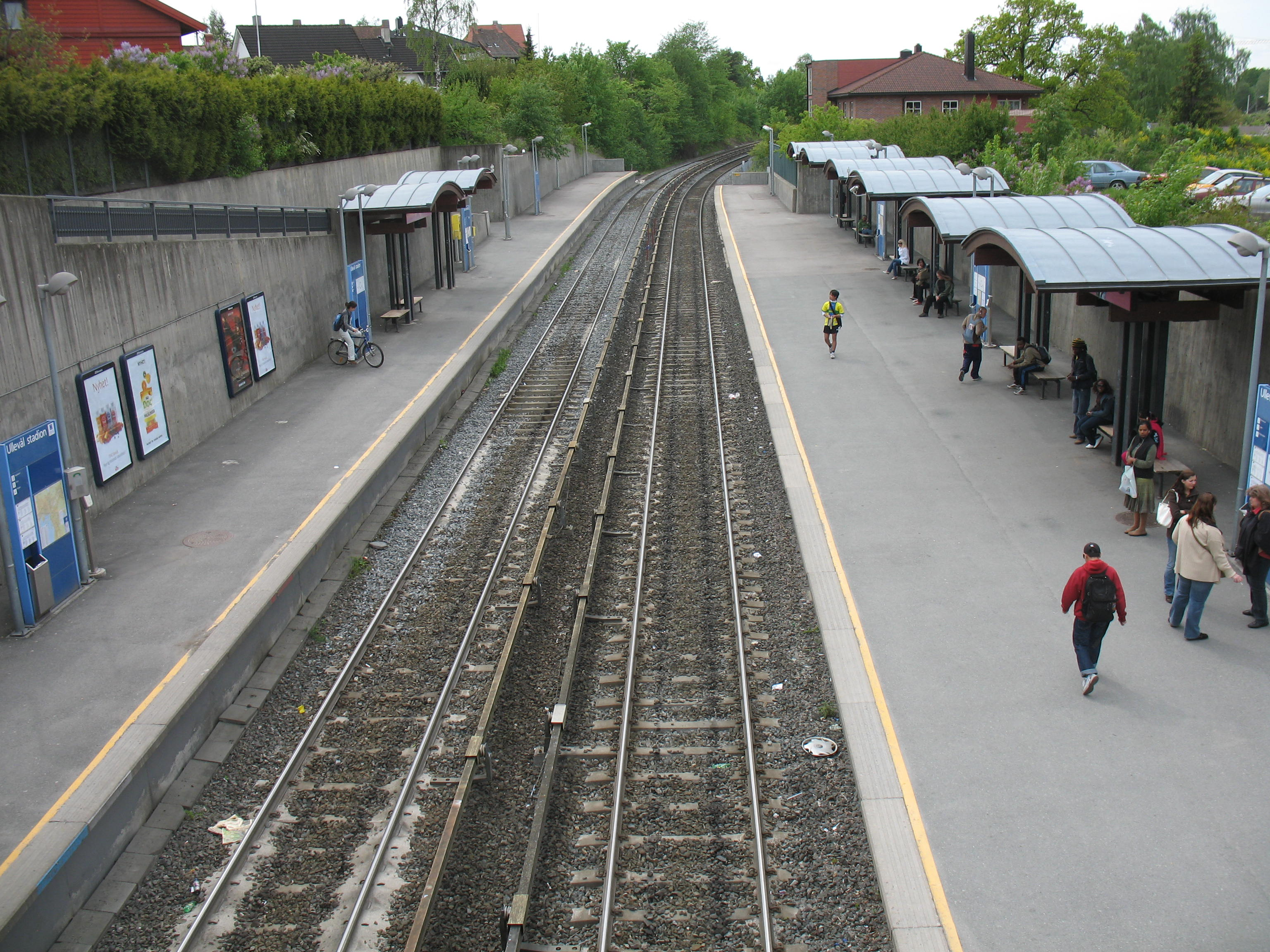

General information
- Location: Ullevål, Nordre Aker, Oslo; Norway
- Coordinates: 59°56′47″N 10°43′54″E
- Elevation: 98.3 m (323 ft) AMSL
- Owner: Sporveien
- Operator: Sporveien T-banen
- Line: Sognsvann Line
- Distance: 5.3 km (3.3 mi) from Stortinget
- Platforms: 2 side platforms
- Connections: Bus: 23, 24, 25, 22

Construction
- Structure type: At-grade
- Accessible: Yes

Other information
- Fare zone: 1

History
- Opened: 10 October 1934
- Rebuilt: 1993

Passengers
- 2002: 2,009 (boarding weekday average)

Services
Preceding station	Oslo Metro	Following station
Nydalen towards Vestli	Line 4 Ring Line	Forskningsparken towards Bergkrystallen
Nydalen towards Sognsvann	Line 5 Ring Line	Forskningsparken towards Vestli
Berg towards Sognsvann	Line 5 Sognsvann Line	Forskningsparken towards Vestli
Location

Ullevål stadion is a rapid transit station of the Oslo Metro's Sognsvann Line. It is situated between the Sogn and Ullevål Hageby neighborhoods of the Oslo, Norway, borough of Nordre Aker. Located 5.3 kilometers (3.3 mi) from Stortinget, the station is served by lines 4 and 5 of the metro, with a combined five-minute headway. Travel time to Stortinget is nine minutes. It is named for and serves Ullevaal Stadion, a football venue home to Vålerenga and the Norway national football team.

The station opened on 10 October 1934 at the same times as the rest of the Sognsvann Line. The station received a major upgrade in 1993, in which it received longer platforms and an overpass. The new station was designed by Arne Henriksen. Since 2003 the Ring Line has branch off from the Sognsvann Line north of Ullevål stadion.

== History ==
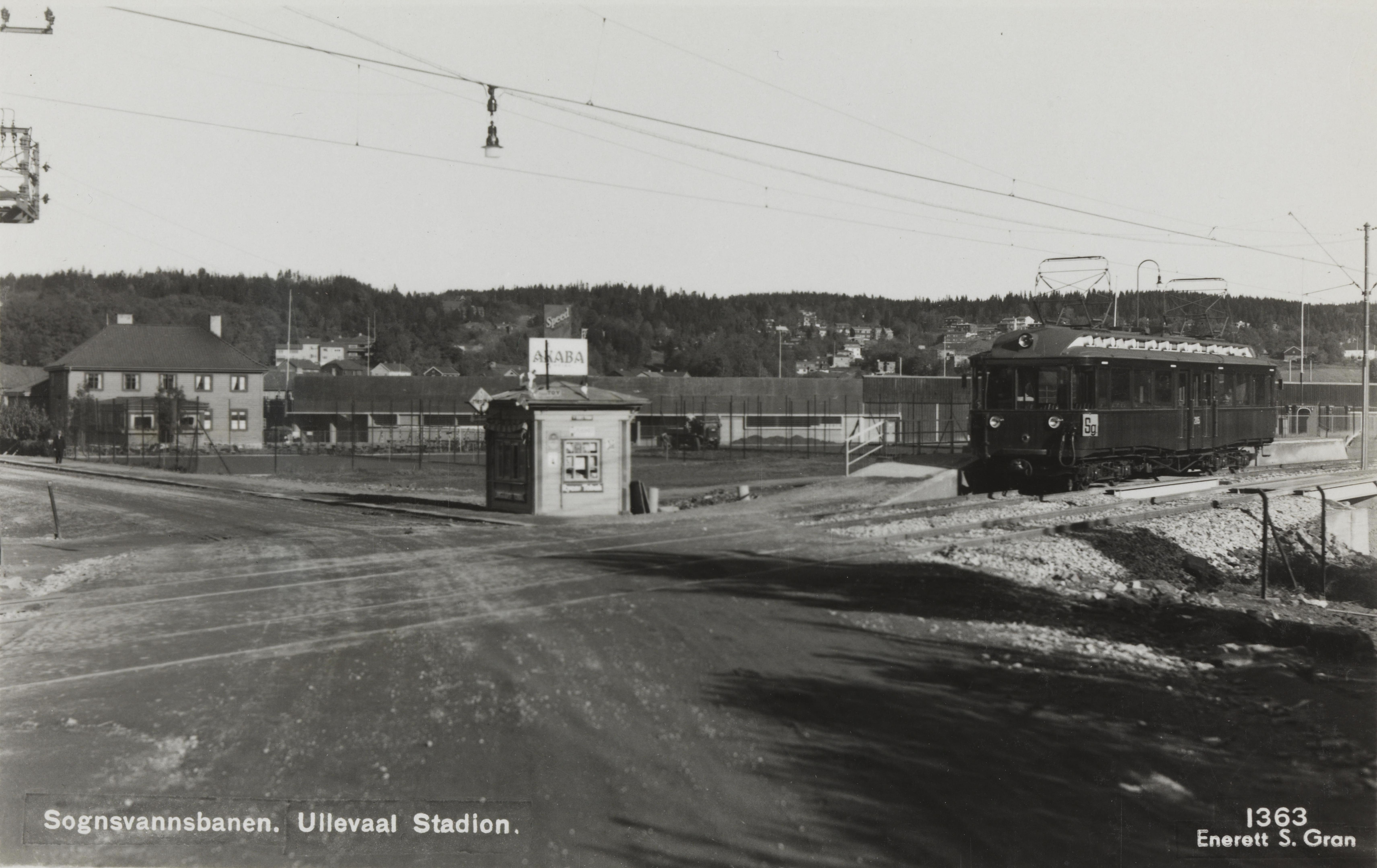
Train at Ullevål stadion between 1934 and 1936

The Ullevål area had residential development from 1855. However, first in the 1920s was there a large-scale construction. Ullevål Hageby was served by the Ullevål Hageby Line of the Oslo Tramway from 1925. Ullevaal Stadion opened the following year, but initially lacked any proper public transport. Aker Municipality worked with plans for construction of a suburban railway which would serve the area. Holmenkolbanen was granted permission in 1922 to build a line, but the plans were placed on hold. Work commenced again in 1933 and the line opened on 10 October 1934.

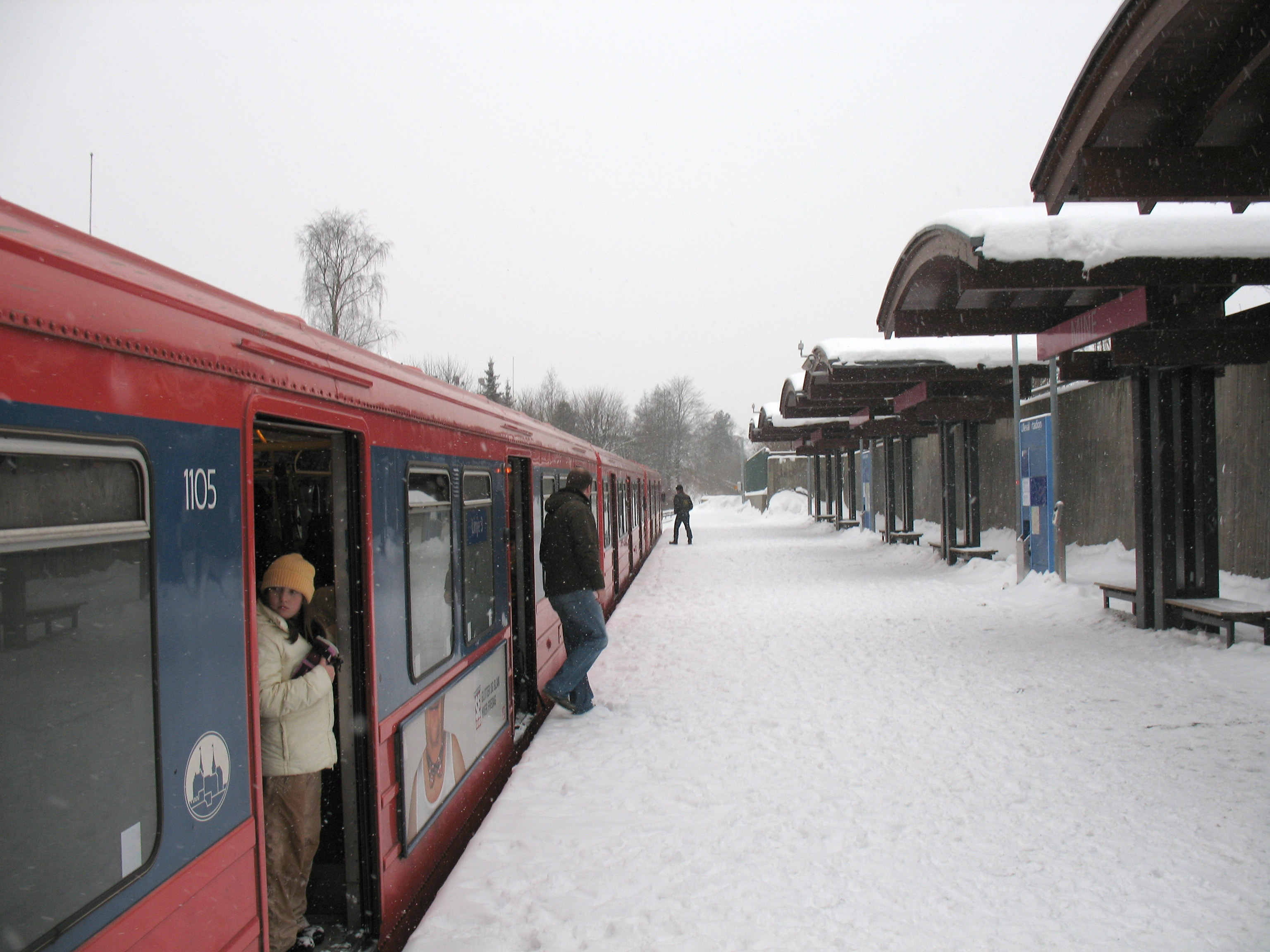
Passengers disembarking a T1000 train in 2006

During the 1980s, the city decided to connect the four suburban lines west of the city center with the Oslo Metro. The Sognsvann Line was selected as the first line to be upgraded, so the two systems would become compatible. The line was upgraded to metro standard by replacing the overhead wire with a third-rail power supply and installing automatic train protection. From 4 April 1993 trains along the Sognsvann Line were connected to the eastern part of the metro, initially connected with the Østensjø Line. From 20 August 2003 the new Ring Line opened and Line 5 continued through it.

== Service ==
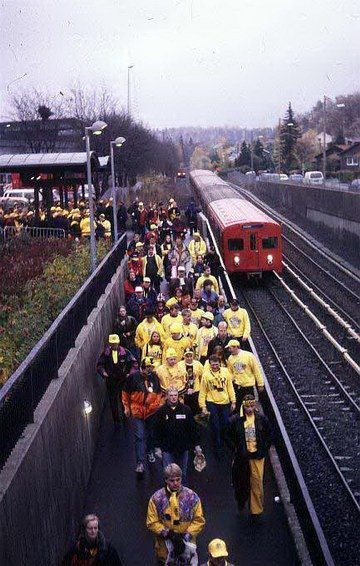
A group of Lillestrøm SK fans disembarking at the station to attend the 2005 Norwegian Football Cup Final at Ullevaal Stadion

The station is served by lines 4 and 5 of the Oslo Metro. During regular hours, each operates at a 15-minute headway. Line 5 passes twice through the Ring, so that there are services every five minutes to the city center and twice every fifteen minutes to the Ring Line. Travel time to Stortinget is nine minutes. Operations are carried out by Sporveien T-banen on contract with Ruter, the public transport authority in Oslo and Akershus. The infrastructure itself is owned by Sporveien, a municipal company. Service is provided using MX3000 three- and six-car trains. The station had an average 2,009 boarding passengers in 2002, ranking ninth among the metro stations that year. It is located in fare zone 1.

== Facilities ==
Ullevål stadion is a rapid transit station situated on the Sognsvann Line, 5.3 kilometers (3.3 mi) from Stortinget in the city center. It is open ground station featuring two side platforms. The station meets the metro standard of the Oslo Metro. This includes two 120-meter (390 ft) side platforms and an overpass. The station is designed by Arne Henriksen and features shelters on each platform. A particularity of the station is that it has few passengers on regular days, but sees very high patronage connection with matches at Ullevaal Stadion. As such, it has the largest roofed waiting areas of any of the stations on the Sognsvann Line. These are built with a mix of steel and glued laminated timber, with a repeating curved roof. There is also a bicycle parking lot and a portal building at the walkway down to the platforms. The station is located south of Ullevål Stadion.
