= Nydalen metro station =

Oslo metro station

Nydalen
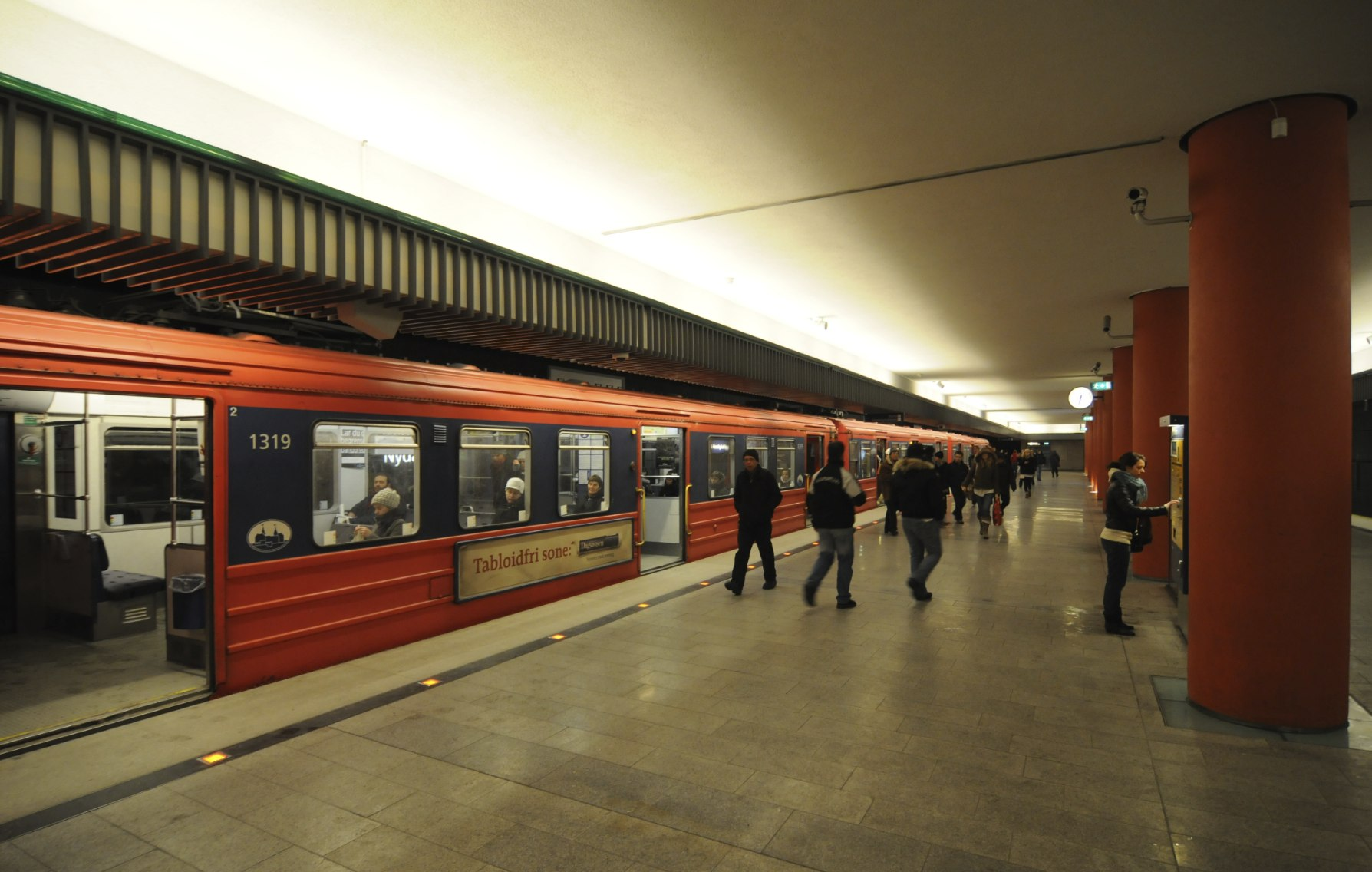

General information
- Location: Nydalen, Nordre Aker, Oslo; Norway
- Coordinates: 59°57′00″N 10°45′50″E
- Owner: Sporveien
- Operator: Sporveien T-banen
- Line: Ring Line
- Connections: Bus service: 30 Bygdøy via Torshov and Bygdøynes; 37 Helsfyr via Jernbanetorget and Etterstad; 51 Maridalen; 56 Solemskogen; 58 Tveita

Construction
- Structure type: Underground
- Accessible: Yes

History
- Opened: 20 August 2003

Services
Preceding station	Oslo Metro	Following station
Storo towards Vestli	Line 4	Ullevål stadion towards Bergkrystallen
Storo towards Sognsvann	Line 5	Ullevål stadion towards Vestli
Location

Nydalen is a rapid transit station on the Ring Line of the Oslo Metro. It is located at Nydalen in the Nordre Aker borough of Oslo, Norway. The station opened on 20 August 2003, as part of the first section of the Ring Line to Storo. The station is served by lines 4 and 5 of the metro, as well as several local bus services. Artistic effort was put into the construction of the station, and the escalators were built into the Tunnel of Light exhibition. Close by the station is the BI Norwegian Business School (BI) campus and several large working places.

== History ==
The process of establishing a Ring Line to serve the northern parts of Oslo started in the late 1980s. The plans were passed by the city council in 1997, and financing was secured in 2000 through Oslo Package 2. Construction started in June 2000, and Nydalen was opened on 20 August 2003, at the same time as Storo.

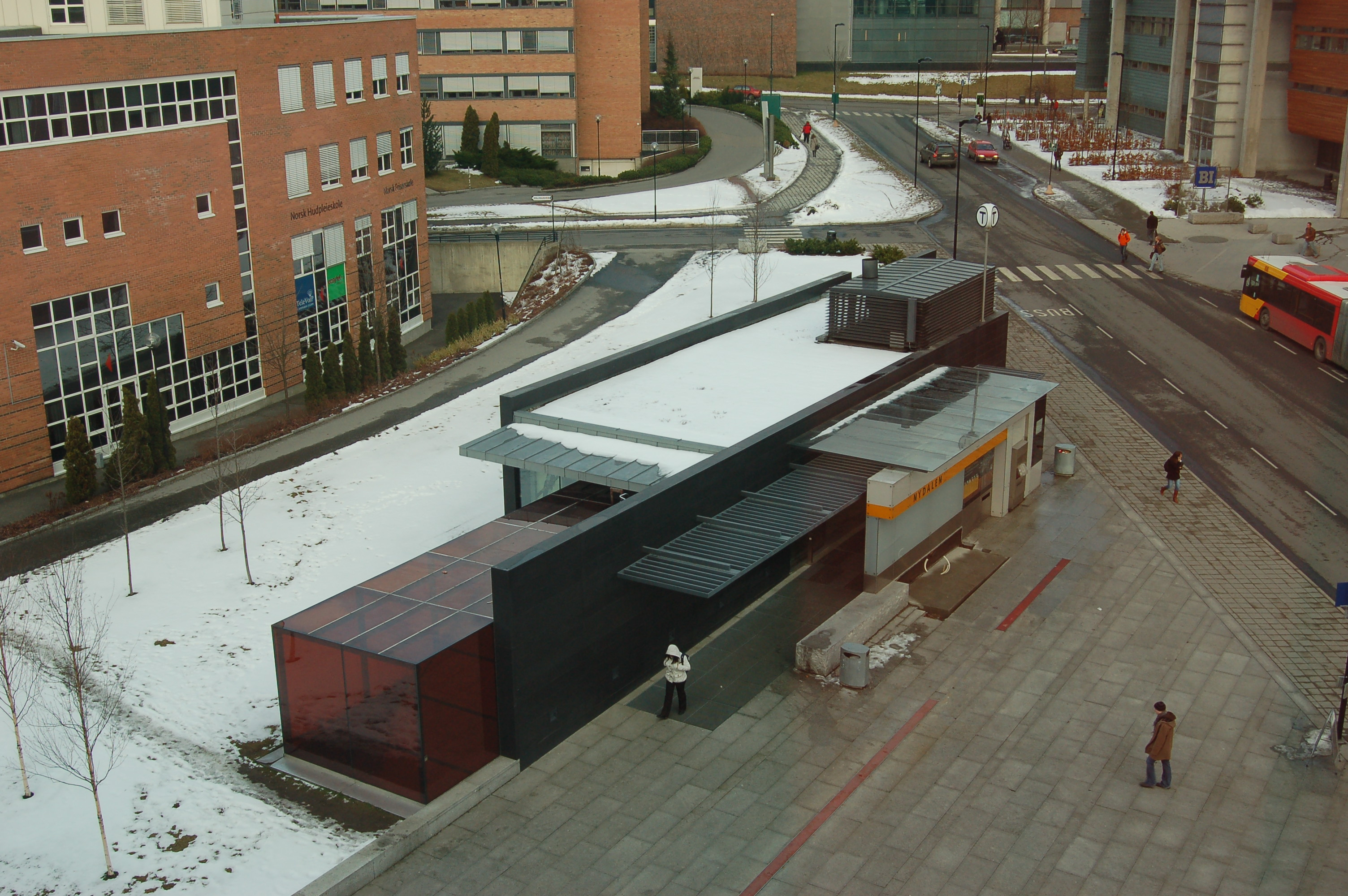
The station entrance

The background for building the rapid transit system to Nydalen, was the urban redevelopment from an industrial to a mixed residential and commercial area during the 1990s and 2000s. About 200 companies have moved to the vicinity of the station, and by 2007 there were 14,800 jobs in the area. The area has several large information technology and telecommunication companies, including ErgoGroup, Agresso, EDB Business Partner, Visma, TDC and NetCom. Large cultural institutions in the area include the national touring theater Riksteatret and the national touring concerts Concerts Norway, the publishing companies Hjemmet Mortensen, De Norske Bokklubbene and Schibsted's printing press. Public offices include the offices of the Nodre Aker Borough and the Norwegian Police Security Service.

In 2005, BI Norwegian Business School moved into their new campus across the street from Nydalen Station. Seven thousand students plus faculty work at the school, of which 85% use public transport. From 2011, the new Nydalen Upper Secondary School will also be located in Nydalen.

== Facilities ==
Nydalen Station is an underground station located on the tunnel section of the Ring Line between Tåsen and Storo. The 4,000 square metres (43,000 sq ft) station was drawn by architect Kristin Jarmund. The station's center platform is located 12 metres (39 ft) underground, with an entrance pavilion at street level. The pavilion has a composition of horizontal and vertical levels and planes. Between these, which are dynamically cast in relation to each other, are the modes of descent down to the platform area: i.e. elevators, escalators and staircases. The planes were built of black basalt, supplemented with large glass spaces that opens up the pavilion. A red glass box, that symbolizes the red trains, stands as a "signal". The platforms is 110 metres (360 ft) long, allowing for six-car trains, and is covered with white granite and a paneled ceiling. The rail area has black concrete walls. There is effect lighting around the columns and recessed spotlights horizontally along the platform. The station is owned by Kollektivtransportproduksjon.

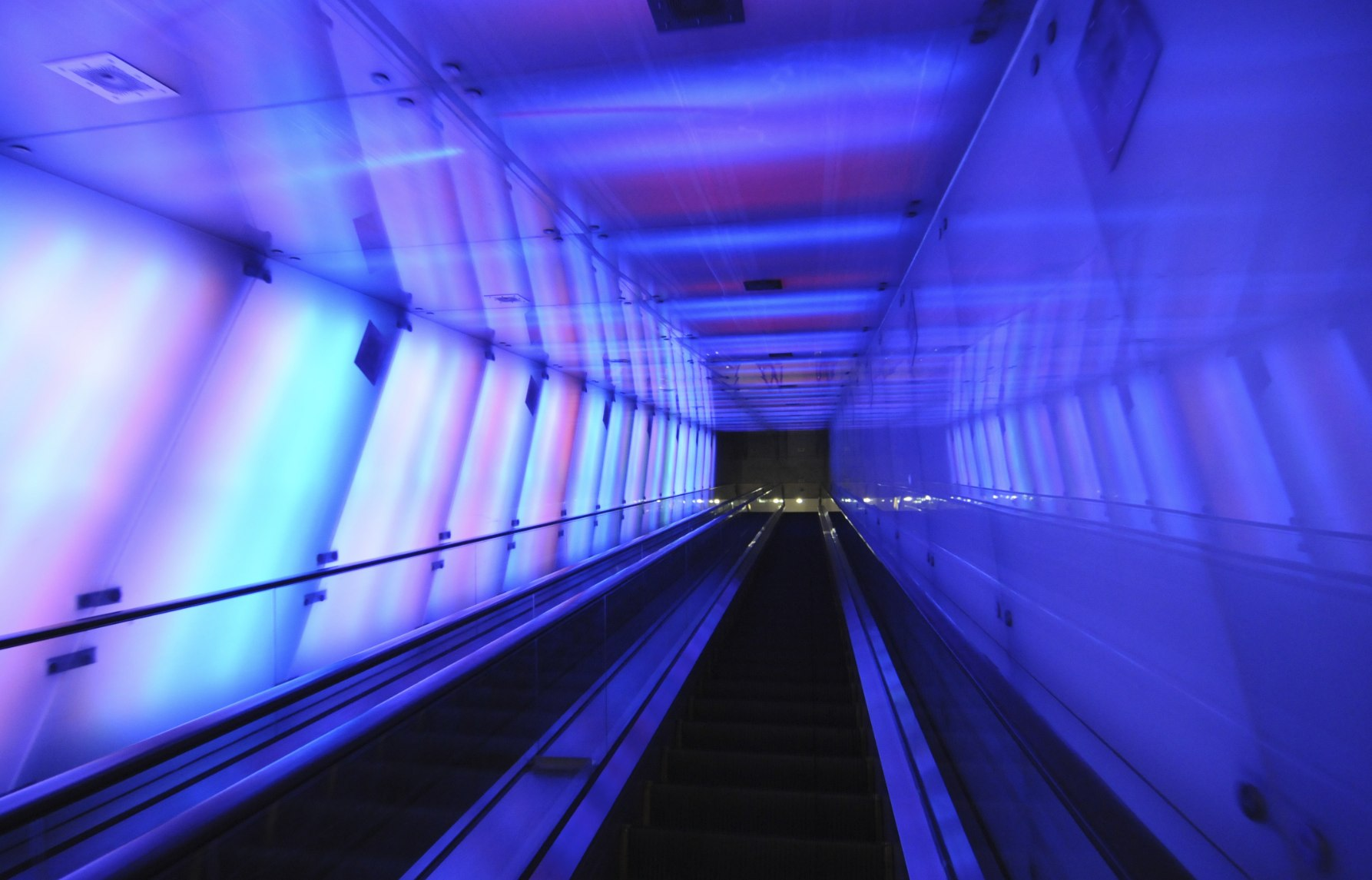
The tunnel of light

The Tunnel of Light is an artistic display of color and sound surrounding the escalator at the station. 1800 fluorescent lamps and 44 speakers are installed behind a layer of glass along the corridor, steadily changing color and mood. The theme is based on different experiences of travel in time and place. There are light and sound combinations for all seasons and all phases of life. The project was initiated by Kristin Jarmund. The light system was developed by Per Åge Lyså at Intravision System, and the software that mixes sound and color was developed by Yngve Sandboe. The music was composed by Bjarne Kvinnsland, mainly based on recorded samples. Among these are text written and performed by Beate Grimsrud.

== Service ==
Lines 4 and 5 of the Oslo Metro operate to Nydalen, each with a 15-minute headway. Lines 4 and 5 operate counterclockwise through the ring via the western part of town into the Common Tunnel, while line 6 operates clockwise via the eastern part into the Common Tunnel. Line 5 continues eastwards only to Storo before stopping; lines 4 and 6 swap numbers between Nydalen and Storo. Travel time from Nydalen to Stortinget is 13 minutes clockwise and 12 minutes counterclockwise. Therefore, any traveler heading for the city center can get on the first train, independent of its direction (except line 5 to Storo), and can be certain it will be the quickest connection to the downtown area.

There is a railway station on the Gjøvik Line also called Nydalen, that is served by NSB Gjøvikbanen as part of the Oslo Commuter Rail. It is located many hundred meters from the metro station, and the two do not offer interconnections. There is a shorter connection to the Gjøvik Line at Storo (that connects with Grefsen Station). Nydalen also serves several bus routes. Line 37 via the city center to Helsfyr operates from across the street at Nydalen, while additional buses are located somewhat further away. They consist a feeder service to Lillo Terrasse (line 55) as well as lines 30 to Bygdøy, 51 to Maridalen and 58 to Helsfyr.

Preceding station	Oslo Metro	Following station
Ullevål stadion towards Bergkrystallen	Line 4	Storo towards Vestli
Ullevål stadion towards Vestli	Line 5	Storo towards Sognsvann
