= Ullevaal Stadion =

Football stadium in Oslo, Norway

Ullevaal
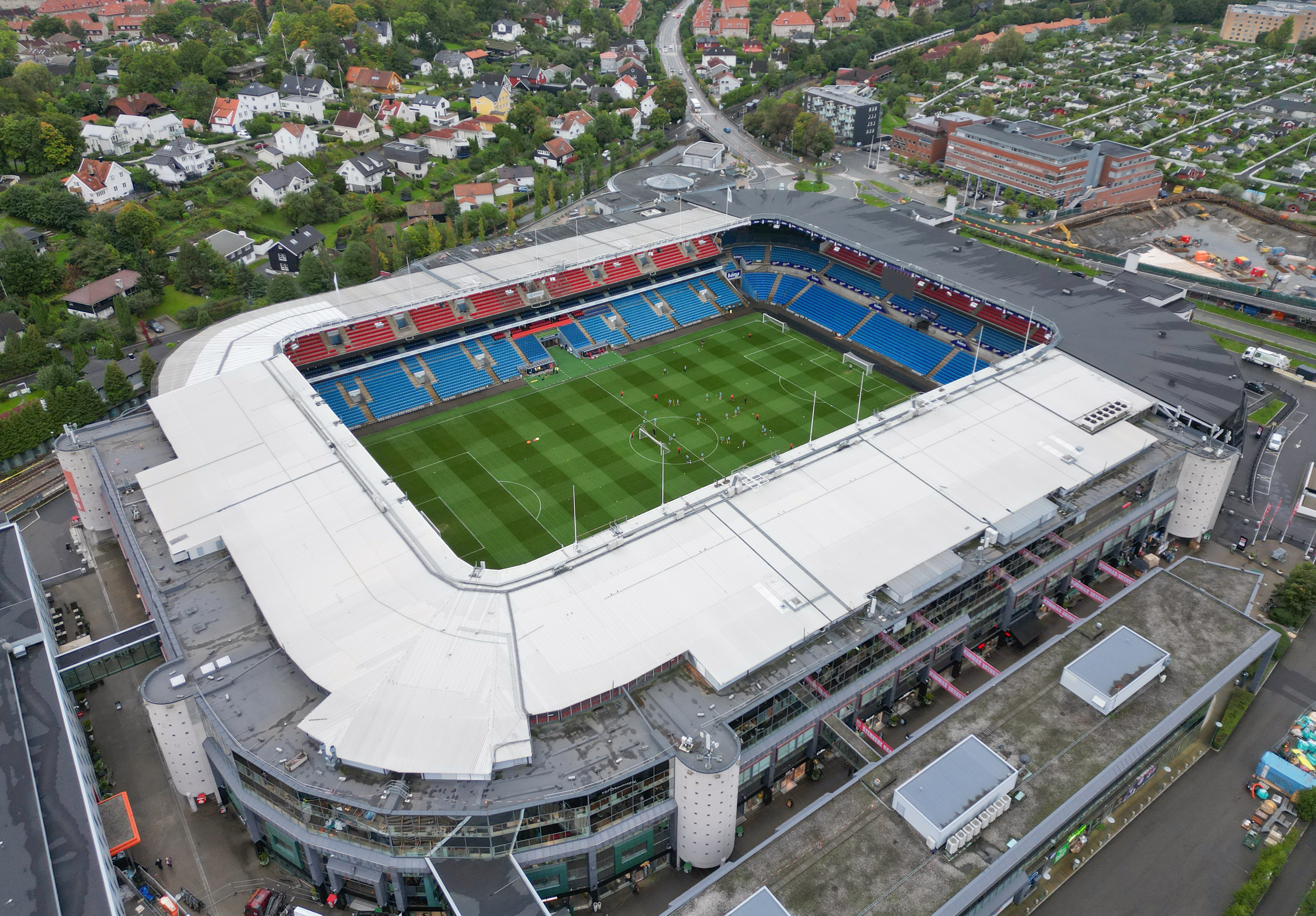
- Aerial view in 2023
- Interactive map of Ullevaal
- Full name: Ullevaal Stadion
- Location: Sognsveien 75; Oslo, Norway
- Coordinates: 59°56′56″N 10°44′3″E
- Owner: Football Association of Norway
- Operator: Ullevaal Stadion Idrett AS
- Capacity: 27,182
- Surface: Natural grass
- Record attendance: 35,495
- Field size: 105 m × 68 m (115 yd × 74 yd)

Construction
- Groundbreaking: 1925
- Opened: 26 September 1926
- Renovated: 1938, 1967, 1985, 1991, 1998, 2013

Tenants
- FK Lyn (1926–2009); Norway national football team (1927–present); Vålerenga IF (1999–2017)

Ullevaal Stadion (Norwegian pronunciation: [ˈʉ̀lːəvɔɫ]) is an all-seater football stadium located in Oslo, Norway. It is the home ground of the Norway national football team, and the site of the Norwegian Cup Final. From its opening in 1926 to 2009 it was the home ground of FK Lyn and from 1999 to 2017 was a home ground of Vålerenga IF. With a capacity of approximately 28,000, it is the largest football stadium in Norway. The national stadium is fully owned by the Football Association of Norway (NFF).

The stadium opened on 26 September 1926 as the home ground for Lyn and several other local teams. The first international match was played in 1927, and NFF started gradually purchasing part of the stadium company. The peak attendance dates from 1935, when 35,495 people saw Norway play Sweden. Since 1948, Ullevaal has hosted the finals of the Norwegian Football Cup, and in 1967 the Japp Stand was completed. A new renovation started with the completion of the single-tier West Stand in 1985, and continued with the two-tier North and East Stands in 1990 and the South Stand in 1998. Ullevaal hosted the finals of the UEFA Women's Euro in 1987 and 1997. It also hosted the UEFA Women's Champions League final in 2026.

In conjunction with the stadium is the head office of many sports federations, a bandy field, and commercial property including a conference center, hotel and shopping mall. The stadium is located adjacent to Ullevål Stadion Station of the Oslo Metro and the Ring 3 motorway. Plans call to replace the West Stand to increase capacity to 30,000 and perhaps add a retractable roof and artificial turf.

== History ==
=== Construction and early years ===
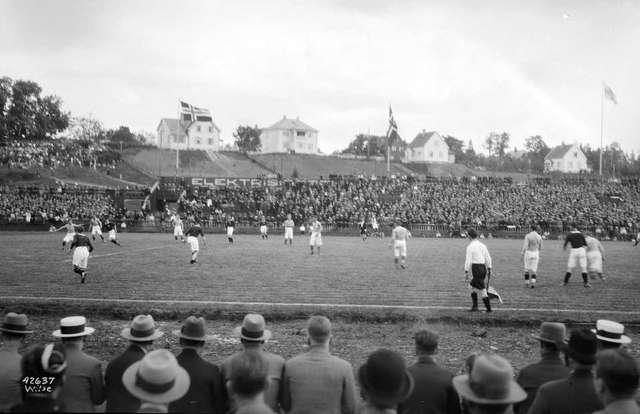
The stadium in 1935

The first suggestions for a stadium at Ullevaal were launched by members of Lyn in 1917, but not until 1924 was a committee appointed to look into the matter. Lyn had also considered building their stadium at Holmenkollåsen, Hoff, Tåsen, Frogner, Berg and Marienlyst.

The club made an agreement with the tram operator Akersbanerne to purchase land they had acquired as part of the construction of the Sognsvann Line. It was decided that a limited company was to be established, with a share capital of NOK 100,000. Aker Municipality agreed to purchase 30% and partially pay via access roads and utilities. All sports clubs in Aker were given the right to purchase up to 10% of the shares, whilst the rest was to be bought by Lyn. Any costs exceeding the capital was to be paid for through loans and donations. At the same time, Lyn acquired land to build a training field which they would own themselves and was estimated to cost NOK 20,000. Both plans were passed by the club annual meeting on 23 May 1924.

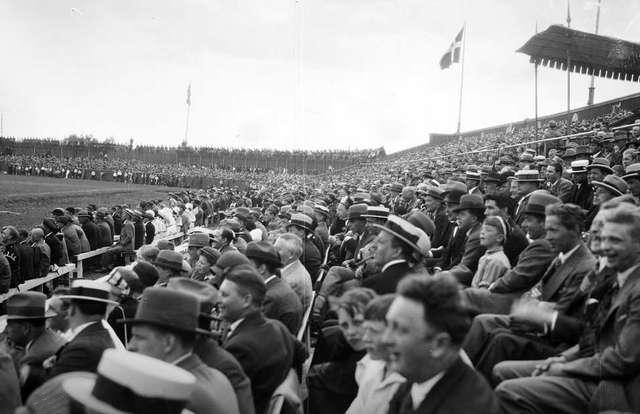
Spectators at a match in 1935

A/S Ullevaal Stadion was founded on 27 January 1925. The company was owned 73.5% by Lyn, 24% Aker Municipality and 5.1% by the clubs Ullevaal, Tåsen, Nydalen and Heming. The stadium was built with a running track, allowing the stadium to also be used for track and field, and had a capacity of about 35,000 spectators. The stadium cost NOK 416,000. The grand opening was held on 26 September 1926 by Crown Prince Olav. It was followed by a friendly match between a reinforced Lyn and Örgryte IS of Sweden, where Lyn won 5–1. In the opening game, tickets cost NOK 3 for seats, NOK 2 for standing places and NOK 1 on the end stands. The stadium became both the home ground for Lyn and hosted track and field events. The first international match was held on 29 May 1927 and featured Norway losing 0–1 against Denmark. The match against Sweden from the Nordic Football Championship 1933/36 on 22 September 1935 was held in front of a crowd of 35,495, which still stands as the spectator record. The stadium was served by the Oslo Metro with the opening of the Sognsvann Line in 1934. In 1938, a new East Stand (Klokkesvingen) was opened.

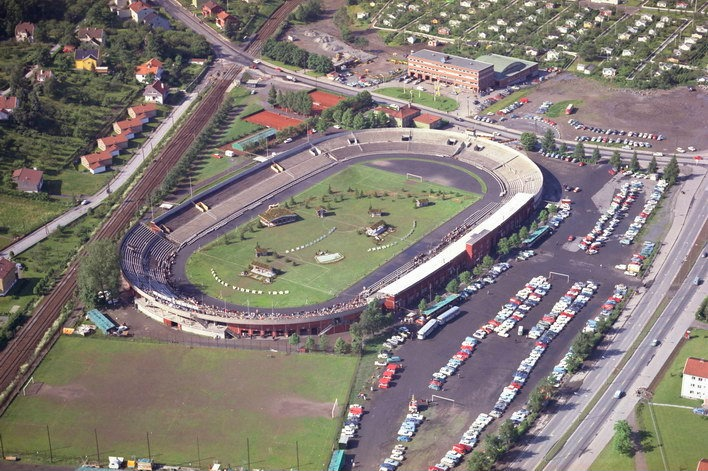
Ullevaal in 1965

The Football Association bought Aker's share of the stadium during the 1930s, and in 1945 also part of Lyn's share. From 1948, the Cup Final was held at Ullevaal, and has been held there since. Other activities held during the first decades included boxing, and a revival meeting hosted by Billy Graham in front of 40,000 people in 1955. In 1960, NFF bought more shares from Lyn and became the majority shareholder with 50.7%, while Lyn retained 44.2%. The reason was the planned expansion could not receive public grants with such a strong tie to a single club, but the state was willing to give grants to the stadium if it was controlled by the federation. In 1967, a new South Stand was opened, and the following year NFF moved into offices at the stadium.

=== Two-tier upgrades ===
In the early 1980s, the owner company presented plans for an upgraded stadium, which would have capacity for 40,000 spectators, of which 25,000 would be seated and 15,000 would stand. In 1984, a new pitch was installed. The first renovation was an all-new West Stand, which would be single-tier and have capacity for 8,800 spectators, of which 3,800 could be seated under a roof. Costs were estimated at NOK 56 million. The costs were covered by Sogn Næringsbygg, who built the stands and then received free ground to build 12,000 square meters (130,000 sq ft) of commercial property. Because of the height, the new stand was met with protests from locals who felt the six-story structure would wreck the idyllic neighbourhood. The stand was completed in 1985. On 14 June 1987, Ullevaal was the host of the final of the 1987 European Competition for Women's Football, where Norway beat Sweden 2–0 in front of 8,408 spectators.

Plans for a new two-tier stand to the north and east were presented next. The plans had called for 24,500 sitting places in the new and south stands, and 5,500 standing places in the west stand. However, in 1989, the plans were modified, as the FIFA made new rules, requiring that only seating places could be used for international qualification matches from 1992. It was thereby decided that Ullevaal would become an all-seater. The renovations included a new turf with under-soil heating, luxury boxes, VIP-seating, a section for the royal family, new change rooms and 5,000 square meters (54,000 sq ft) of restaurant and meeting area. The upgrade involved the removal of the running track, making Ullevaal a pure football stadium.

Construction of the two stands started after the cup final in November 1989, and started with the demolishing of the north stand from 1926 and the east stand from 1938. After construction was completed, Lyn played its first home game on Ullevaal for the season on 13 September 1990, after having played most of the season in the Second Division at Voldsløkka Stadion. The construction included 32,000 square metres (340,000 sq ft) of commercial properties built beneath the stands. Total investment costs for the new stands and commercial area was NOK 350 million, of which NOK 100 million was for the stands. Plans for a NOK 40-million underground squash court were discarded.

=== NFF and Lyn dispute ===
In 1993, Lyn was in deep financial difficulties after having been promoted to the Elite League after the 1991 season. To create additional liquidity, the club sold its 44% share in Ullevaal to the Football Association for NOK 4.4 million in January 1993. At the same time, NFF bought the 5.1% stake owned by the other clubs, making NFF the sole owner of the stadium. In October, the limited company Lyn Fotball AS was founded to take over the elite football teams in Lyn. At the same time, the club announced that it planned to purchase back their shares in Ullevaal Stadion, by letting the club take up a loan.

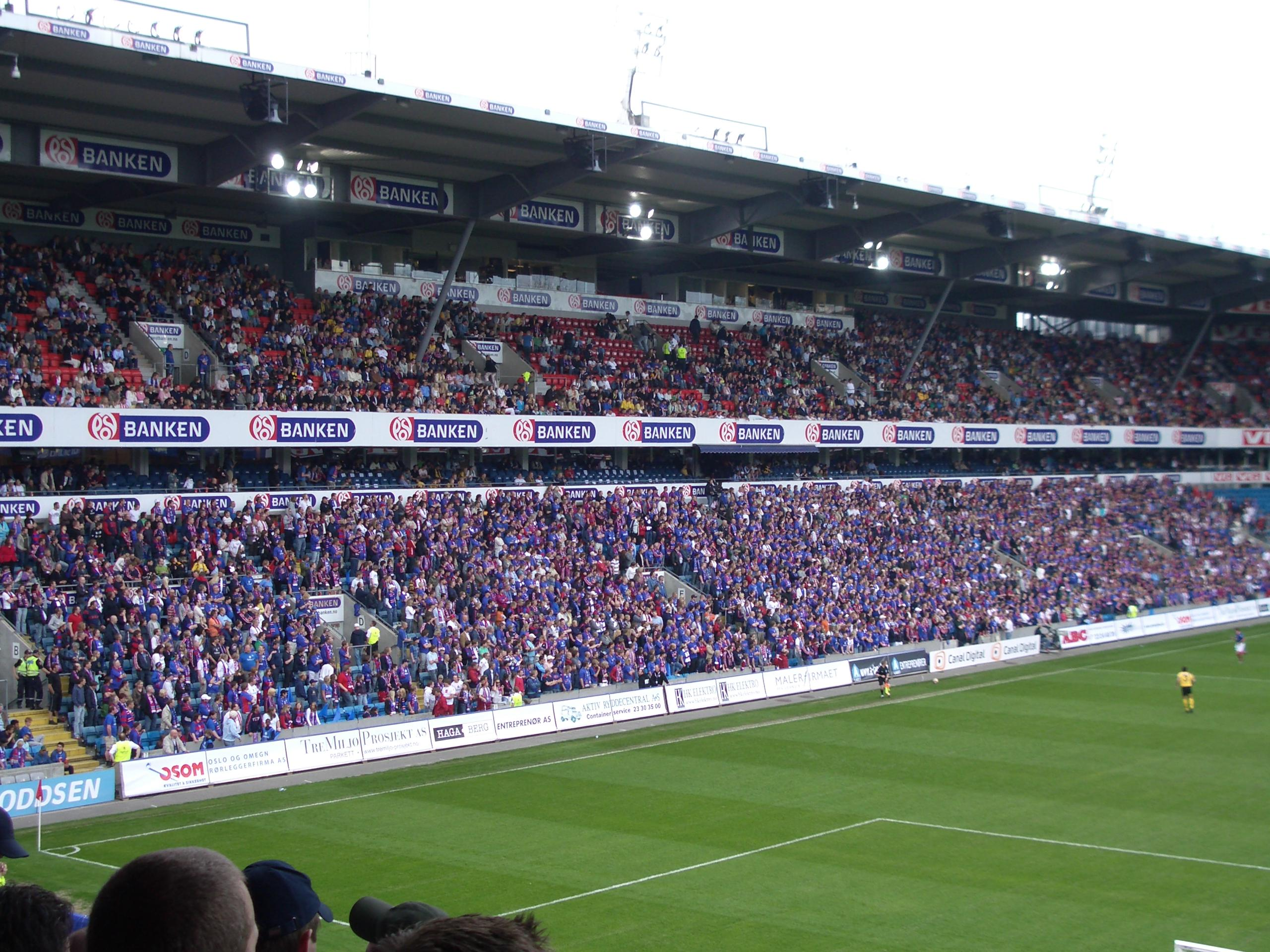
Vålerenga supporters on the North Stand, which opened in 1990

In November, Lyn stated that they wanted to purchase the shares in Ullevaal from NFF, who stated that they were now worth NOK 10 million. NFF also raised questions if it was actually Lyn or the newly created limited company who were actually going to buy the shares. NFF stated that they were opposed to anyone but the federation and clubs owning the national stadium and that they were opposed to private investors. The federation hoped to use the high incomes generated from the recent success of the national team, including from participation in the 1994 FIFA World Cup, to allow the stadium company to charge high rent for the international matches and Cup Finals, thus quickly eliminating the stadium's debt. NFF felt it was unfair that they were in practice subsidizing Lyn by not having similar rent increases for the club, and that this should be reflected in the share value. In March 1994, Lyn sued NFF for the right to purchase the shares for NOK 4.4 million plus interest.

In May, it was stated that the matter would not be handled in the courts, but instead by the Football Association's Tribunal, with the possibility to appeal to the Norwegian Confederation of Sports' Tribunal. This was because FIFA's regulations forbade a club from suing their own federation. In January 1995, the tribunal decided that Lyn had the right to purchase the shares for NOK 4.4 million plus interest. By February, it became clear that Lyn did not have sufficient liquidity to purchase the shares. In December 1995, three months before the purchase option became invalid, the club bought back the shares. In 2001, it became clear that Lyn had given false information about the deal, and that the club had signed an agreement with Lyn Fotball AS which was later criticized by club members as a "raid" by the investors to secure the main asset in Lyn. The loan had a high interest rate and had clauses that made a refinancing expensive, it gave the investors a right of pre-emption for the shares, the right for the investors to terminate the load on short notice, and the right for the investors to take over the shares should the club not be able to manage the debt.

In February 1996, Lyn and NFF stated that they had agreed that Lyn would sell their shares in Ullevaal to NFF for about NOK 5 to 6 million, plus support for Lyn's new training facility at Kringsjå. The parties stated that with the plans for expanding and making new investments in Ullevaal, Lyn's lack of financial backing would become a hindrance for financing the projects and that the sale would allow Lyn to concentrate on playing football. On 25 March, NFF and Lyn stated the sale was terminated by NFF, because it was considered too lucrative for Lyn by other clubs in Norway. In 1996, the stadium featured a cross-country skiing event with 5,500 spectators. On 12 July 1997, Ullevaal was the host of the final of the UEFA Women's Euro 1997, where Germany beat Italy 2–0 in front of 2,221 spectators.

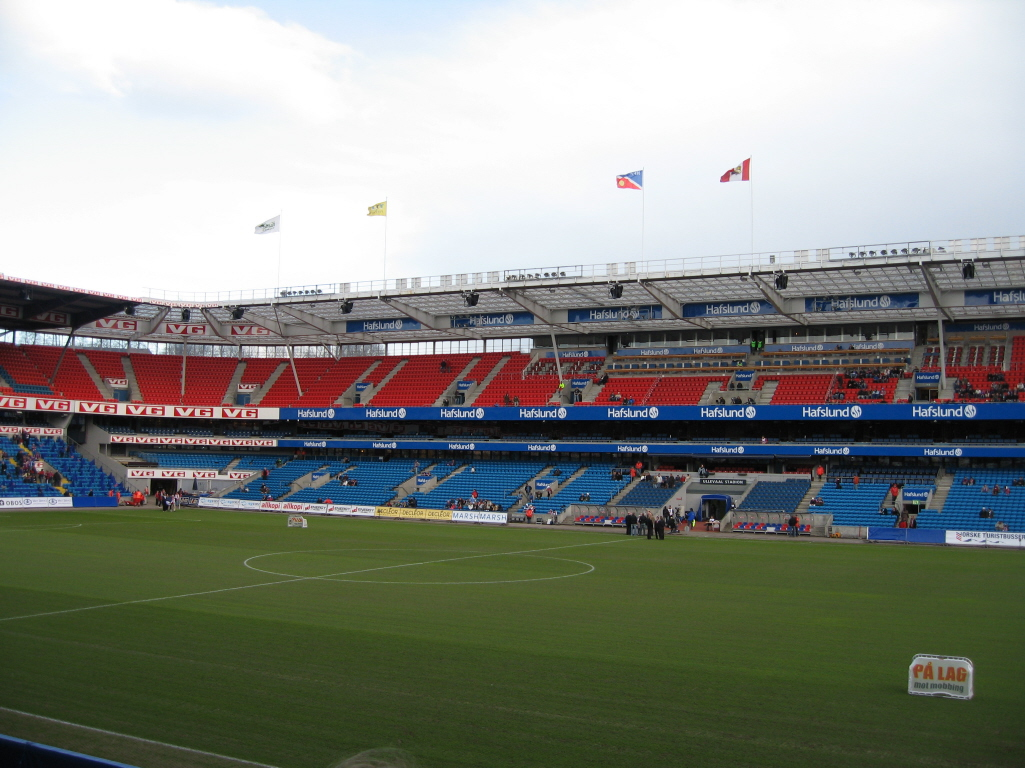
The South Stand (right) was built to meld seamlessly with the older East (VG) Stand.

In 1997, NFF and Lyn agreed to renovate and expand the stadium. The plans called for new stands which would increase the capacity to 30,000 spectators. The size of the field would be reduced by 350 square meters (3,800 sq ft), from 107 by 70 meters (117 by 77 yd) to 105 by 68 meters (115 by 74 yd) to make the stadium more intimate. The new grass would be lowered 130 centimetres (51 in), allowing two more rows of chairs to be added. The South Stand (Japp) would be demolished and a new two-tier stand would be built, in the same style as the northern and eastern stands. This would give three sides two-tier height, although the western stand would remain single-tier. The South Stand received 30 luxury boxes and press quarters for 192 people. The project involved the demolishing of the four light masts and instead installing the lights along the roof. The cost of the whole project was estimated at NOK 300 million.

The project also included 44,000 square metres (470,000 sq ft) of commercial real estate, to be located behind the south stands. Because public grants of about NOK 90 million could only be given to non-profit entities, the ownership of the stadium was split in two. The stands and other core areas of the stadium remained owned by the stadium company, while a separate company was created to own the commercial areas. NFF wanted the profits from the commercial company to go to the stadium company to pay for operating expenses, while Lyn wanted the profits to be paid as dividend to the owners so Lyn could pay interests on their debt. Construction started in January 1998, after Lyn had lost a court case regarding the dividend structure.

The Norwegian Olympic Committee and Confederation of Sports, including the federations for many smaller sports, chose to move to Ullevaal and establish their offices in conjunction with the stadium, in Dråpen located at the south side. The Norwegian Football Museum was established and received 250 square metres (2,700 sq ft) in the southern stand building.

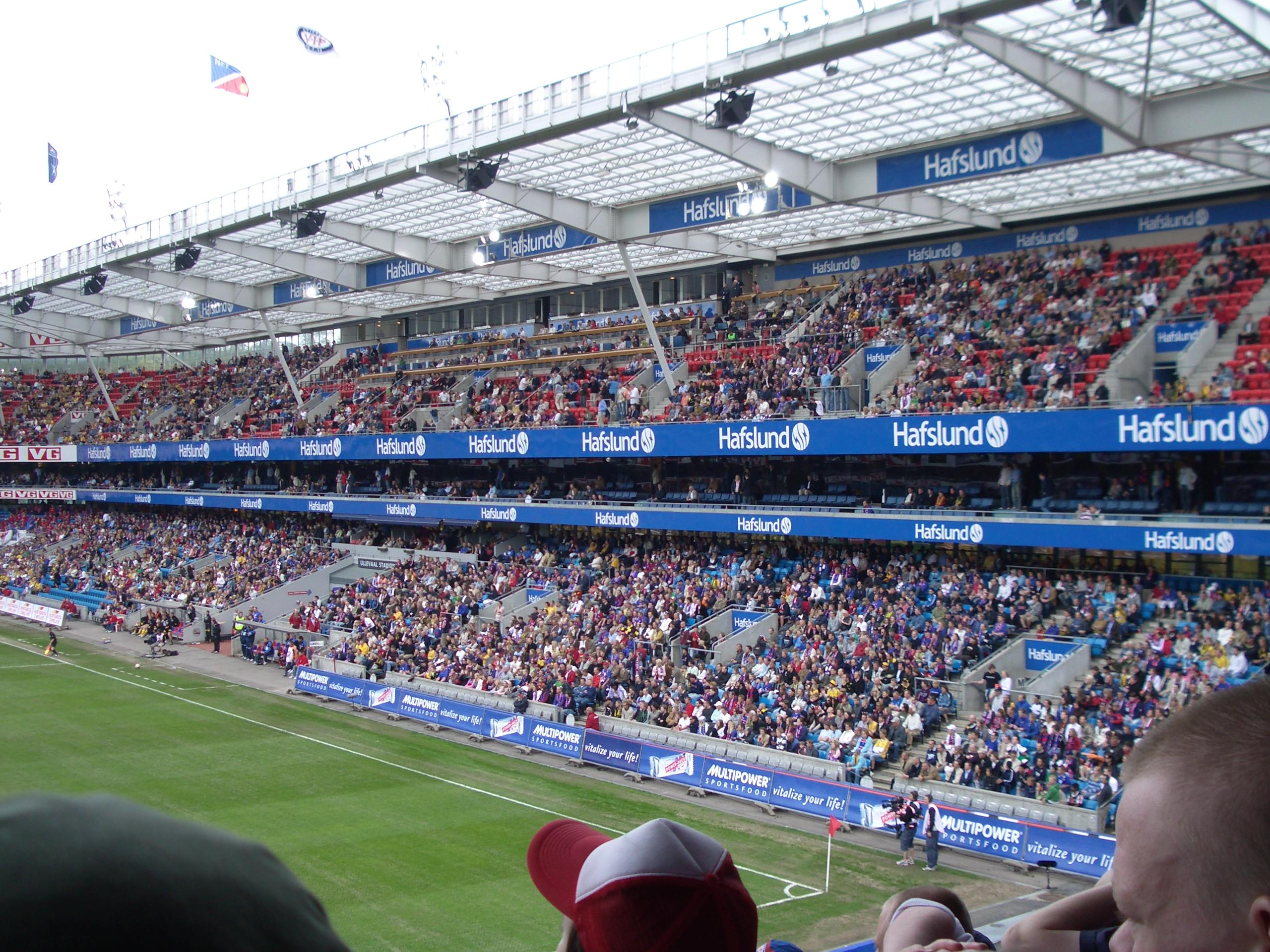
South Stand

During construction in 1998, Lyn and the national team played their games at Bislett Stadion—the home venue for Vålerenga—while Ullevaal was being rebuilt. Prior to the 1999 season, where Lyn would have to play in the First Division, Lyn applied to play all their matches at Bislett to cut rental costs at Ullevaal. However, this was rejected by the municipality, who owned Bislett, because there was not vacant capacity at Bislett.

=== Vålerenga enters ===
In late 1998, Vålerenga considered moving their matches to Ullevaal from 1999. Although they stated that they had a better economic proposal from Ullevaal, the team stayed at Bislett to have more influence on the design of the new stadium that would replace the existing structure. Oslo's other Premier League team, Skeid Fotball, stated that they had also considered playing at Ullevaal, but wanted to keep the more "intimate feeling" at Voldsløkka Stadion. However, Vålerenga were forced to move some of their 1999 matches to Ullevaal because the dilapidated standards at Bislett. Prior to the 2000 season, Vålerenga signed a three-year contract with Ullevaal, making the national stadium their home.

In 2000, Ullevaal Stadion AS bought the West Stand, including the commercial areas. In March 2001, NFF gave Lyn a loan for NOK 12.5 million, on the condition that if it was not paid back within two years, NFF would take over Lyn's ownership in the stadium. This made it possible for Lyn to pay their investment company back the debt for the loan, which had increased to this amount in five years, and to purchase the stadium and secure NFF the right of pre-emption. On 4 July 2002, Lyn and NFF announced that NFF would make a private placement of NOK 27 million in Ullevaal Stadion AS and at the same time terminate Lyn's debt. In exchange, Lyn's ownership was reduced to 15%.

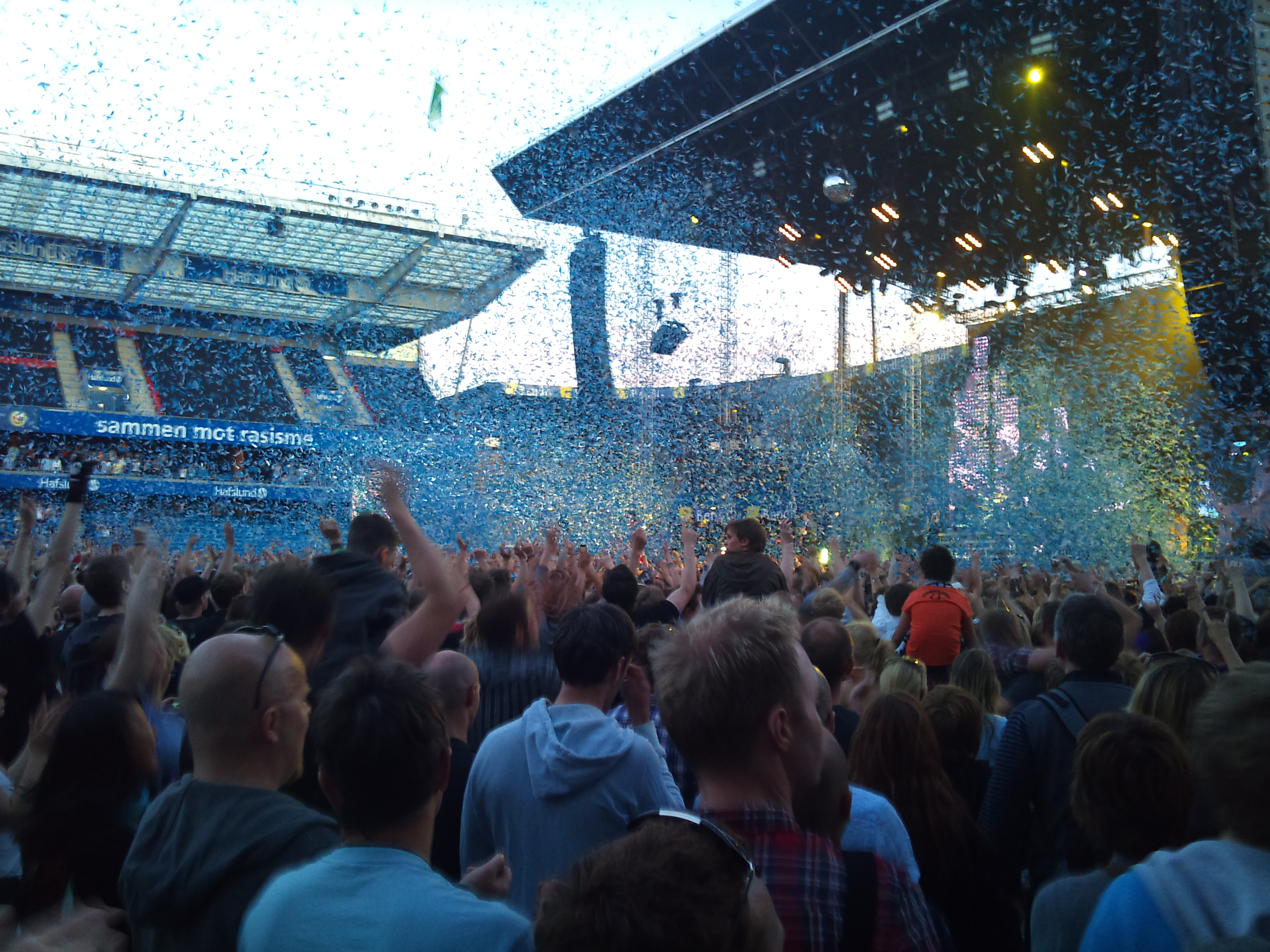
Concert with Green Day in 2010

In 1998, Vital Forsikring bought the real estate located between the east of the stadium, Ring 3 and the Sognsvann Line. The lot covered 30,000 square metres (320,000 sq ft), including the commercial properties under the stands. A new zoning plan was rejected by the municipality in 2000, but in 2005 the plans were passed. In 2008, Vital started constructing a hotel and more commercial spaces at the site. The hotel had 144 rooms and would be operated by Thon Hotel; other investments included a congress hall for 800 people and a reconstruction of the sports facility Bergbanen. Total area was 24,000 square meters (260,000 sq ft), including 1,500 square meters (16,000 sq ft) for the congress center, 5,000 square meters (54,000 sq ft) for the four-story hotel, and a 6,300-square-meter (68,000 sq ft) expansion of the shopping center by. The shopping center area thus became 53,000 square meters (570,000 sq ft). The investments cost NOK 550 million and were scheduled for completion in 2009. The project also included the bandy field Bergbanen and a new club building for Ullevål IL. Ownership of the bandy venue was transferred to the municipality.

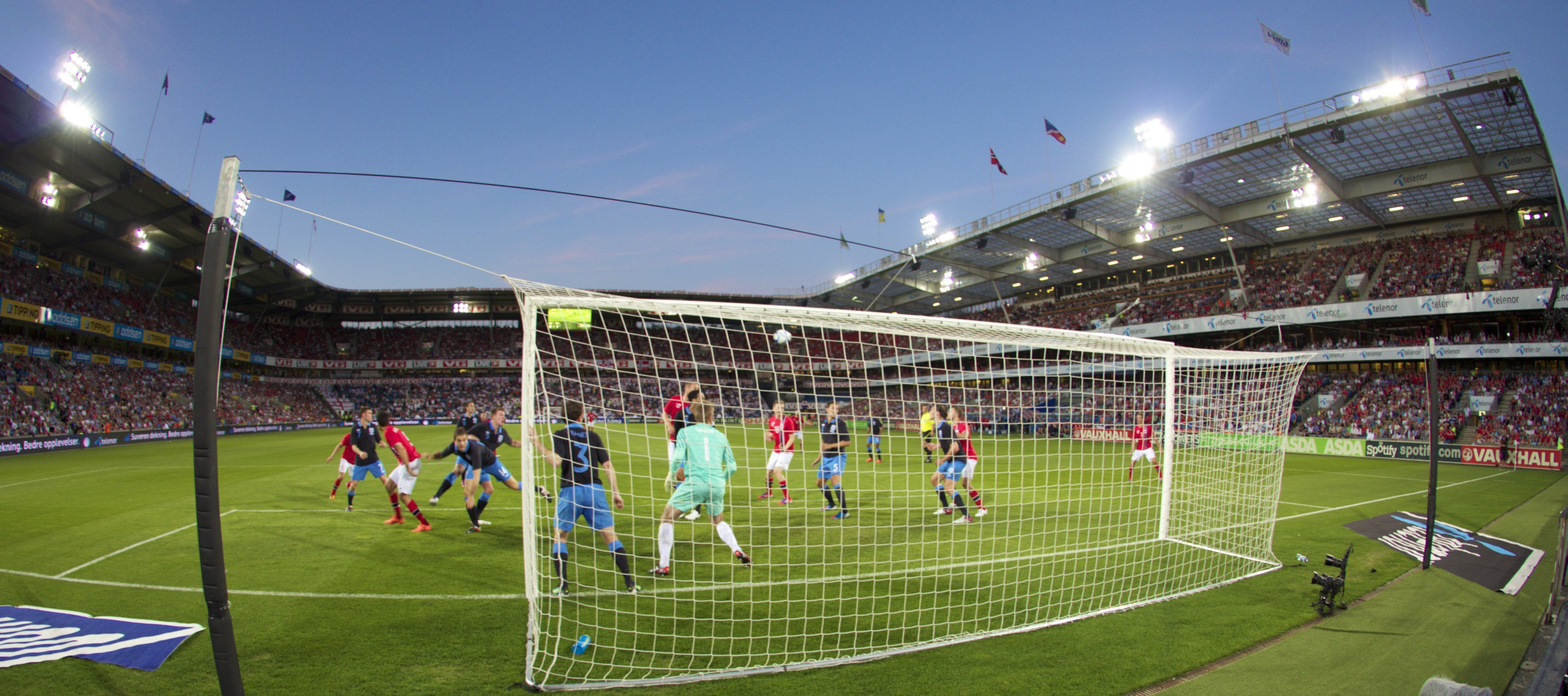
Norway playing England in 2012

On 23 October 2005, Vålerenga set its attendance record of 24,894 in a league match against Rosenborg BK. On 23 March 2007, NFF bought Lyn's remaining 13.07% share of Ullevaal, securing the federation full control of the national stadium. Lyn was paid NOK 32.5 million for the transaction. Following Lyn's relegation from the Norwegian Premier League after the 2009 season, the club decided to move its home games from Ullevaal to Bislett. This was to avoid the high costs that the club had renting Ullevaal, which cost the club NOK 150,000 per game, compared to a similar fee per season at Bislett. Lyn played its last home game at Ullevaal on 3 November, when it lost 0–5 against Fredrikstad FK. In the 2009 season of the Premier League, Vålerenga had the fourth-highest average attendance at 10,788, while Lyn had the lowest at 4,187. Lyn's least-seen game attracted 2,092 people. After it was decided that the Eurovision Song Contest 2010 was to be held at Stabæk's home venue Telenor Arena, Stabæk was forced to rent Ullevaal to play three of its home games during April and May 2010. In a 2012 survey carried out by the Norwegian Players' Association among away-team captains, Ullevaal was found to be the league's best stadium, with a score of 4,47 on a scale from one to five.

=== Vålerenga leaves ===
Vålerenga had long stated that they wanted to relocate and had conducted plans to build a new stadium at Valle Hovin, where the club currently have their administration and training facilities. Plans existed for stadiums for 22,000 spectators, which would be expandable to 32,000. Part of the rationale for their own stadium is that Vålerenga traditionally is the east side team, while Ullevaal is located in the heart of the west side. As an alternative, Vålerenga considered moving back to Bislett, at least as a temporary solution, though this did not occur. Vålerenga eventually ended up completing their plan and moved out mid-season to Intility Arena in September during the 2017 Eliteserien season, rendering the Norway men's national football team and the men's and women's cup finals the only permanent tenants of Ullevaal.

In the 2024 Norwegian First Division, Ullevaal hosted its Vålerenga-Lyn men's derby as the two teams were in the same division for the first time since Lyn's 2009 relegation, despite both teams having moved out of Ullevaal for their regular matches and that the teams were now playing in tier 2. Vålerenga were playing in Eliteserien until being relegated after the 2023 season, whereas Lyn went bankrupt in late 2010 and were moved to tier 7 (6. divisjon) and worked their way up through the divisions.

== Facilities ==
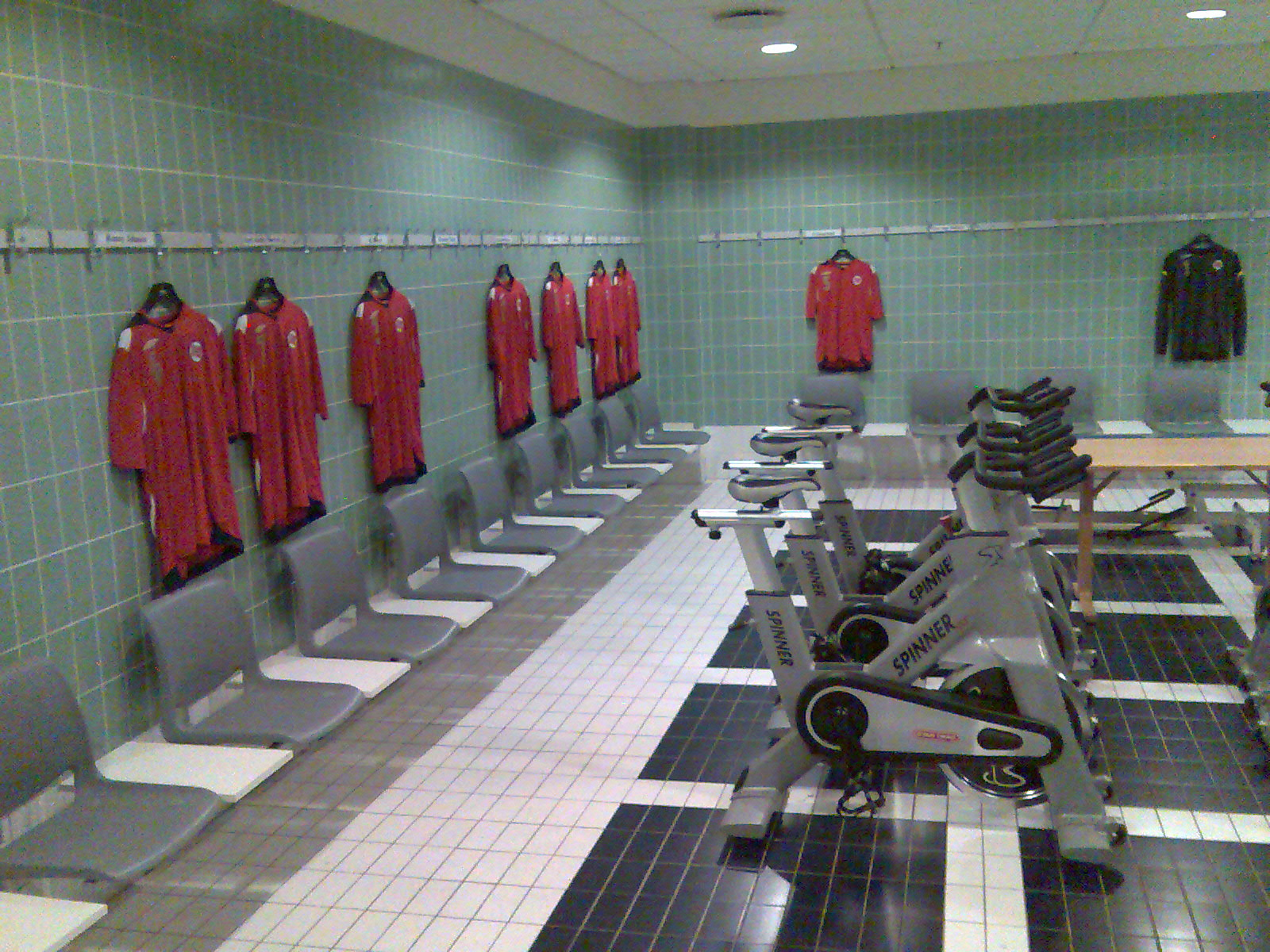
Changing room

The stadium is owned by AS Ullevaal Stadion, a limited company wholly owned by the Norwegian Football Association. Operations of the stadium is performed by the subsidiary Ullevaal Stadion Idrett AS, while the NFF-owned Ullevaal Business Class AS (UBC) is responsible for operating the luxury boxes, the conference centre and VIP-services. The commercial area in the North and East Stands, plus that located north and east of the stadium, is owned by Vital Forsikring.

The stadium has a capacity of 25,572 spectators, of which 1,470 are VIP seats and 28 are for wheelchair users. There are four stands: to the north the Postbanken Stand, to the west the VG Stand, to the south the Hafslund Stand and to the west the Bendit Stand. The stadium has 16 entrances with 40 counters, five VIP entrances, one ticket office with twelve booths, 40 toilets, 20 kiosks and three emergency rooms. The stadium building is 202 by 162 meters (663 by 531 ft) long and the height of the roof is 23 meters (75 ft). The sound system provides 66,000 watts, and the flood lighting has 160 lamps that give 1,400 lux. Ullevaal Business Class offers 29 boxes and 1,418 VIP seats directly accessible from the boxes. In addition, in part in conjunction with the hotel, UBC has a number of conference rooms, of which the largest can hold 800 people.

The pitch is 105 by 68 meters (115 yd × 74 yd), and the area within the stands is 122 by 82 meters (133 yd × 90 yd), of which grass covers 112 by 78 meters (122 yd × 85 yd). The grass is a combination of Lolium perenne, Poa pratensis and Poa annua, with 3% artificial grass sown inn. The pitch features a sprinkler system and under-soil heating with an effect of 750 kW located 25 to 30 centimeters (9.8 to 11.8 in) under the surface. The pitch has a plastic cover which can cover the full size and which, powered by a fan, hovers 4.5 meters (15 ft) above the ground.

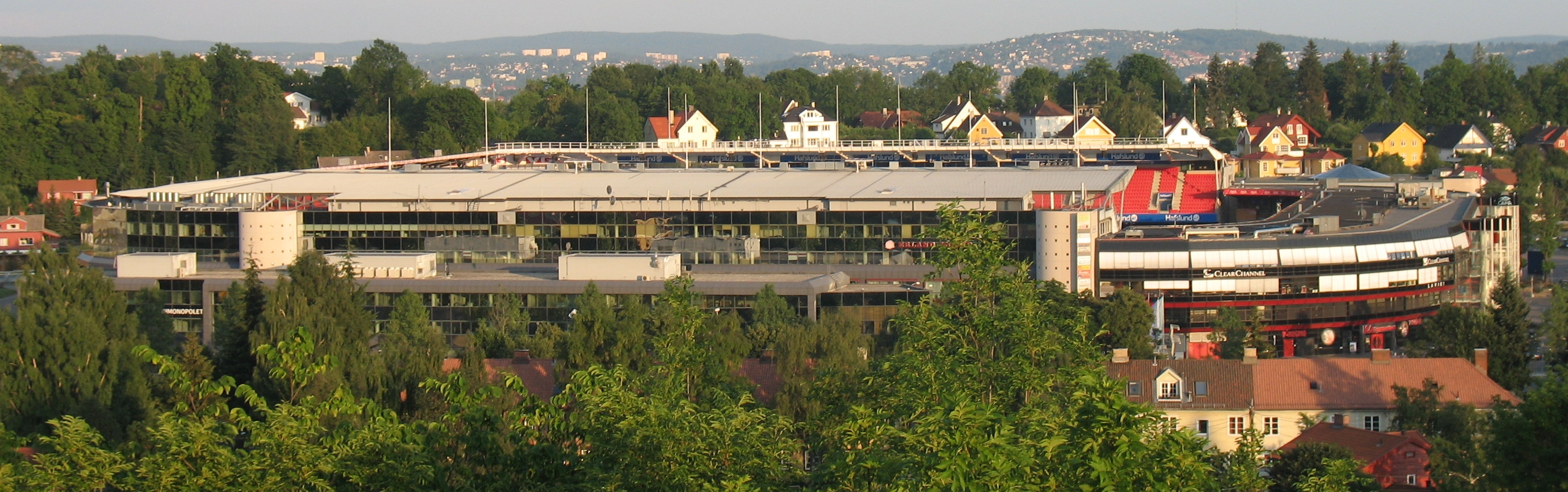
The stadium seen from afar, with the West Stand to the left

The stadium contains 39 square meters (420 sq ft) of press room, a television studio, 16 commentator boxes and 130 square meters (1,400 sq ft) of working space for journalists. There is a photography room, a separate section for photographers on the stand, and a press conference room with place for 96 people. All the press facilities are in the South Stand. There are similar facilities in the North Stand, allowing a television team from the opposing nation to make a double production. They can film and send with advertisements from the other side of the stadium and thus increase advertisement income.

Both NFF, the Norwegian Olympic and Paralympic Committee and Confederation of Sports and many sport federations have their head offices at Ullevaal. At Ullevaal is the Norwegian Football Museum, which offers tours of the stadium. Just east of the stadium is Bergbanen, a municipal bandy field used by Ullevål IL. The pitch is located on top of a parking house. NFF owns 40,000 square meters (430,000 sq ft) and Vital owns 53,000 square meters (570,000 sq ft) of commercial property at Ullevaal, including a shopping centre and office space.

== Concert venue ==
As a concert venue, Ullevaal Stadion has played host to a-ha in 2002 and 2010. Several other international artists has also performed there, including Rammstein, Kygo, Green Day, Bon Jovi, Iron Maiden and Bruce Springsteen. a-ha has also filmed two music videos at the venue. The music videos for the songs Did Anyone Approach You? and the 2003 live version of the classic The Sun Always Shines on T.V.

== Transport ==
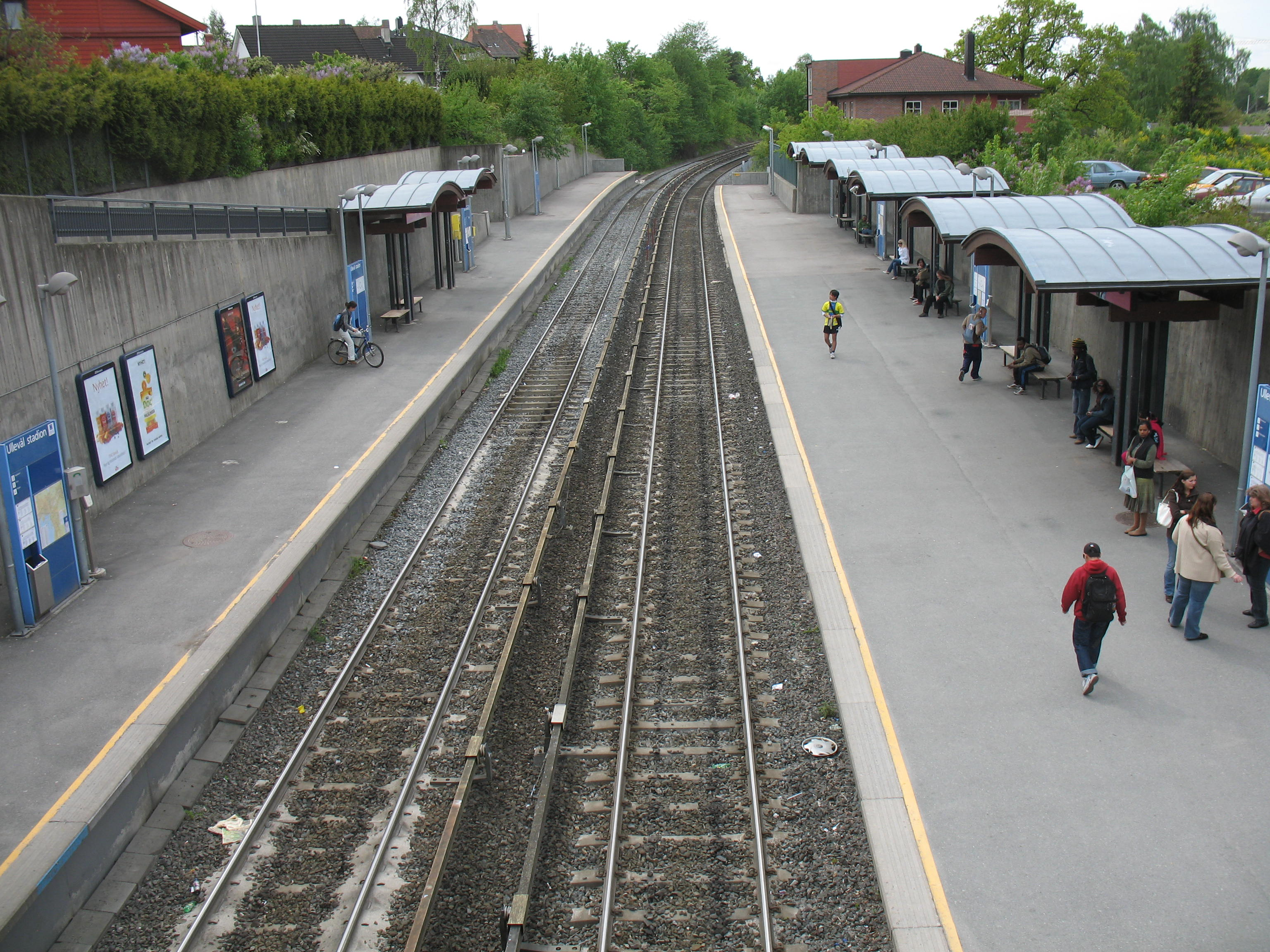
Ullevaal is served by the station Ullevål stadion of the Oslo Metro

The stadium is located next to the Ullevål stadion station of the Oslo Metro, and is served by lines 4 and 5 (the Sognsvann Line and the Ring Line). The stadium is also within a ten-minute walk from Rikshospitalet station of the Oslo Tramway, located on the Ullevål Hageby Line and served by trams 17 and 18. In addition, the motorway Ring 3 runs nearby. Parking is available at Rikshospitalet, Domus Atletica and Sogn Upper Secondary School; these are within a five minutes walk.

== Future ==
In 2005, NFF launched plans for a redevelopment of Ullevaal, including artificial turf, a retractable roof and redevelopment of the West Stand to increase total capacity to 30,500 spectators. The combination of the three would allow Ullevaal to become a multi-purpose venue and allow more matches to be played, grant the teams more practice time on their home pitch, make room for sponsor events, allow more concerts and potentially allow non-football sports, such as sprint skiing, to be held.

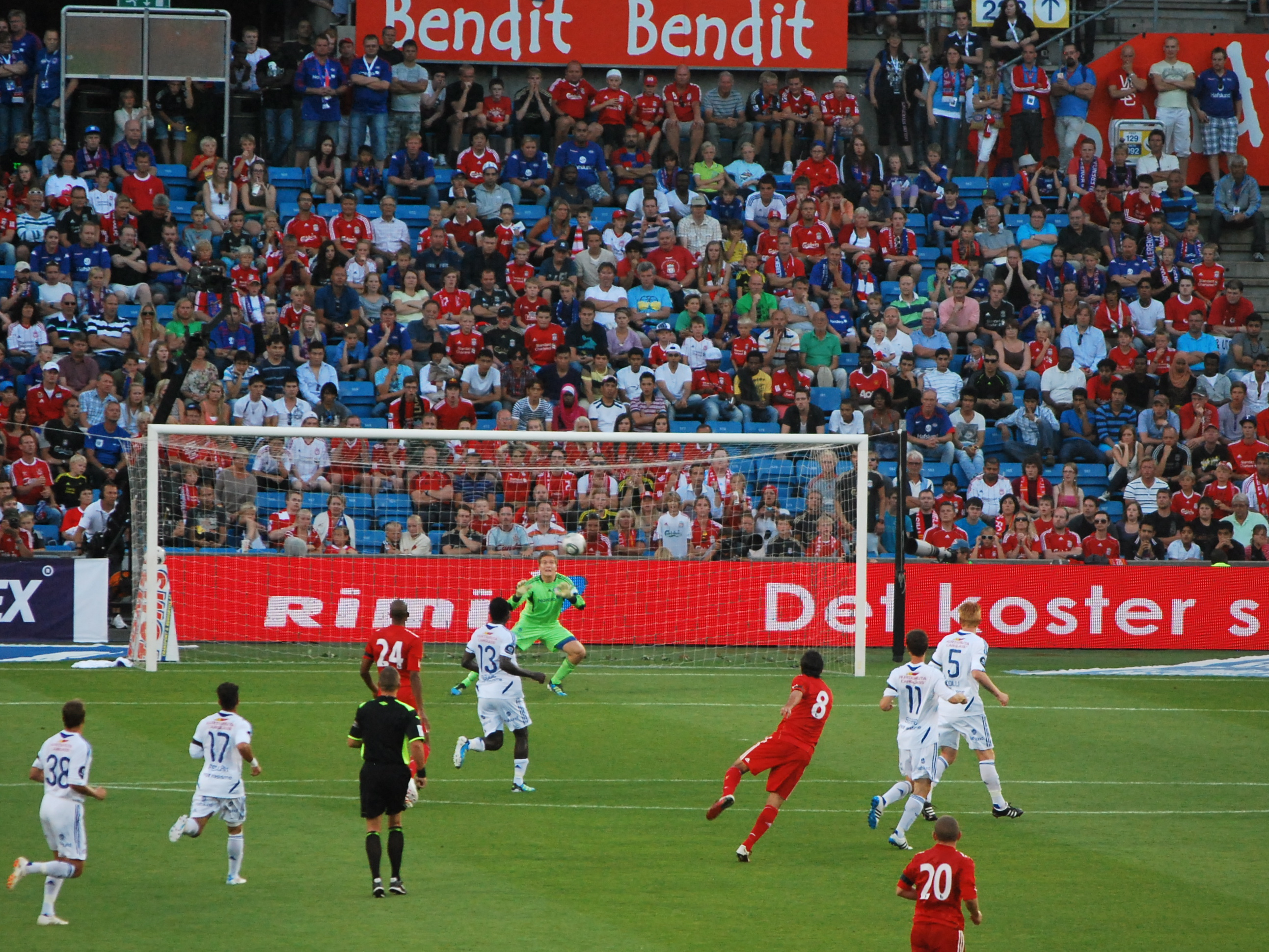
Vålerenga playing Liverpool in 2011

To make it easier to attract good international teams, the management of Ullevaal considered coordinating the laying of artificial turf with Parken Stadium in Copenhagen and Råsunda Fotbollstadion in Stockholm, the home of the Danish and Swedish national teams, respectively. Plans for artificial turf were rejected by both Lyn and Vålerenga, who both threatened to move elsewhere should the stadium install artificial turf. Commentators have stated that among older footballers there is opposition against artificial turf, but that long Norwegian winters cause pitches to be extremely bad during the early parts of the season. It has been argued that younger Norwegian players are used to artificial turf and that in the future they will need better pitches to play "finer" football. In 2010, seven of sixteen premiership stadiums used artificial turf; commentators have stated that if Ullevaal converted, it could be a pivoting point for other clubs to do the same.

NFF has launched plans for a new national football stadium. Inspired by the new Friends Arena to be built in Stockholm, a new venue would have a capacity for 52,000 spectators and was part of the joint Norwegian–Swedish bid for UEFA Euro 2016. To finance a new stadium, NFF would have to sell Ullevaal. NFF stated that expanding Ullevaal beyond 31,000 spectators would be excessively expensive and that the location poses limitations in transport infrastructure to handle so large crowds. In 2008, Ullevaal, including the 40,000 square meters (430,000 sq ft) of commercial area owned by NFF, was valued to about NOK 1 billion, of which the commercial area was valuated at NOK 750 million. In 2006, Ullevaal Stadion AS had NOK 522 million in debt.

| Preceded by Two-legged final | UEFA Women's Euro; Final Venue; 1987 | Succeeded by Stadion an der Bremer Brücke; Osnabrück |
| Preceded by Fritz-Walter-Stadion; Kaiserslautern | UEFA Women's Euro; Final Venue; 1997 | Succeeded by Donaustadion; Ulm |
