= Blindern station =

Metro station in Oslo, Norway

Blindern
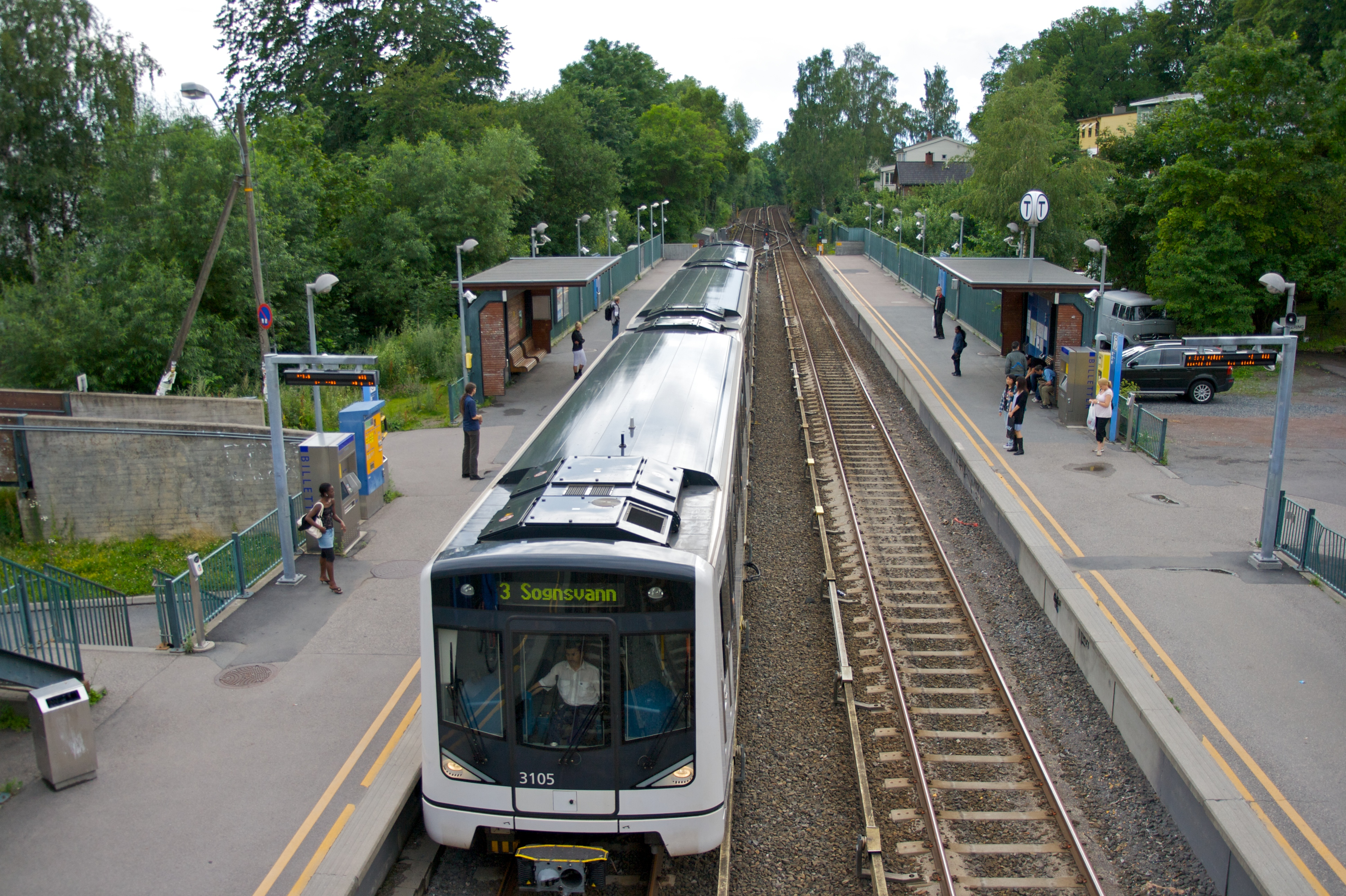
- MX3000 train at Blindern

General information
- Location: Blindern, Nordre Aker, Oslo; Norway
- Coordinates: 59°56′24″N 10°42′58″E
- Elevation: 74.8 m (245 ft)
- Owner: Sporveien
- Operator: Sporveien T-banen
- Line: Sognsvann Line
- Distance: 4.0 km (2.5 mi) from Stortinget

Construction
- Structure type: At-grade
- Accessible: Yes

Other information
- Fare zone: 1

History
- Opened: 10 October 1934
- Rebuilt: 1993

Passengers
- 2002: 4,989 (weekday boarding average)

Services
Preceding station	Oslo Metro	Following station
Forskningsparken towards Vestli	Line 4 Sognsvann Line	Majorstuen towards Bergkrystallen
Forskningsparken towards Sognsvann	Line 5 Sognsvann Line	Majorstuen towards Vestli
Location

Blindern is a rapid transit station on the Oslo Metro's Sognsvann Line. It is situated in the Blindern neighborhood of the Nordre Aker borough of Oslo, Norway. Located 4.0 kilometers (2.5 mi) from Stortinget, the station is served by lines 4 and 5 of the metro, with a combined five-minute headway. Travel time to Stortinget is seven minutes. Along with Forskningsparken, it serves the campus of the University of Oslo.

The station opened on 10 October 1934 along with the rest of the Sognsvann Line. Until 1994 the station was called Blindernveien, named for the road which crossed the line at a level crossing. The station received a major upgrade in 1993, in which longer platforms and an overpass for pedestrians were installed.

== History ==
Construction of single dwellings in the area commenced in the 1920, starting off with the Blindern Haveby estate. In 1920 the Parliament of Norway decided that the area would be the main campus for the University of Oslo. Meanwhile, Aker Municipality worked with plans for construction of a suburban railway which would serve the areas around Blindern. Holmenkolbanen was granted permission in 1922, but the plans were placed on hold. Work commenced again in 1933 and the line opened on 10 October 1934. It was originally called Blindernveien.

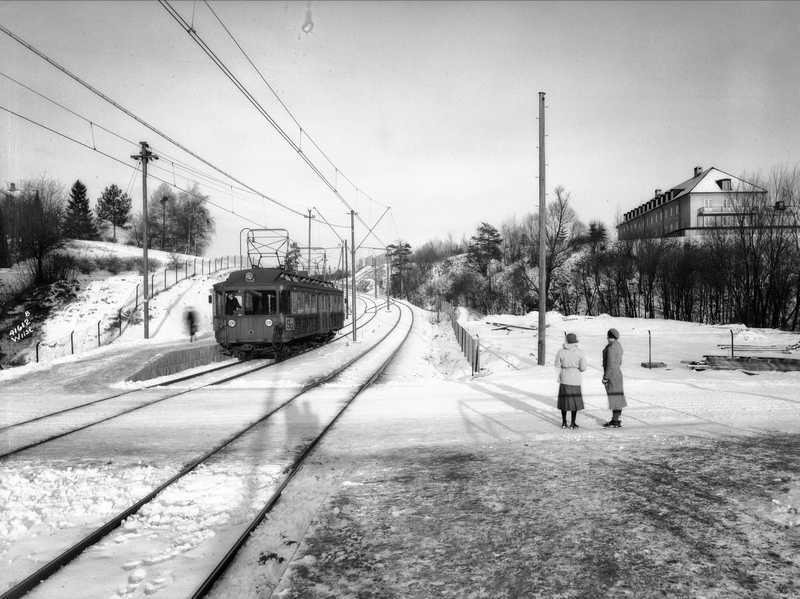
Blindernveien Station in 1935, at a time when the eponymous road still crossed the line at the station

The Norwegian Meteorological Institute moved to Blindern in 1937, but large-scale development of the campus did not take place until the 1960s. During the 1980s, the city decided to connect the four suburban lines west of the city center with the Oslo Metro. The Sognsvann Line was selected as the first line to be upgraded, so the two systems would become compatible. The line was upgraded to metro standard by replacing the overhead wire with a third-rail power supply and installing automatic train protection. The upgrade also involved standardizing the design on all the stations on the Sognsvann Line. The station cut off the road Blindernveien, as it could not longer cross the tracks. Originally the plans had called for the street to be carried over the station on an overpass. This was protested by local residents, and eventually led to a much smaller overpass being built which only carried a combined pedestrian and bicycle path.

The station took the new name Blindern from 1994. From 4 April 1993 trains along the Sognsvann Line were connected to the eastern part of the metro, initially connected with the Østensjø Line. From 8 April 1995 the trains from the Grorud Line terminated at Blindern. From 20 August 2003 the new Ring Line opened and Line 5 continued through it. The university was working for renovation of the station for its bicentennial anniversary in 2011, but this was never carried out due to lack of funding. The project would have seen new platforms and a new overpass with separate bicycle and pedestrian pathways.

== Service ==
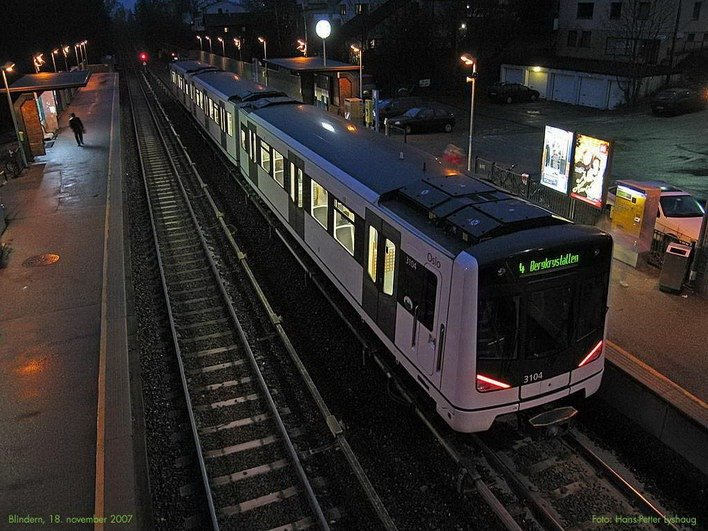
Evening MX3000 train

The station is served by lines 4 and 5 of the Oslo Metro. During regular hours, each operates at a 15-minute headway. Line 5 passes twice through the Ring, so that there are services every five minutes to the city center and twice every fifteen minutes to the Ring Line. Travel time to Stortinget is seven minutes. Operations are carried out by Sporveien T-banen on contract with Ruter, the public transport authority in Oslo and Akershus. The infrastructure itself is owned by Sporveien, a municipal company. Service is provided using MX3000 three- and six-car trains. The station had an average 4,989 boarding passengers in 2002, ranking ninth among the metro stations that year. It is located in fare zone 1, which overlaps with the borders of Oslo Municipality.

== Facilities ==
Blindern is a rapid transit station situated on the Sognsvann Line, 4.0 kilometers (2.5 mi) from Stortinget in the city center. It is an open ground station featuring two side platforms. The station meets the metro standard of the Oslo Metro. This includes two 120-meter (390 ft) side platforms and an overpass. The station is designed by Arne Henriksen and features a short shelter on each platform. The station is located on the western side of the Blindern campus of the University of Oslo, from which the station derives a significant portion of its traffic.
