= Oslo Package 2 =

Public transport investment package in Norway

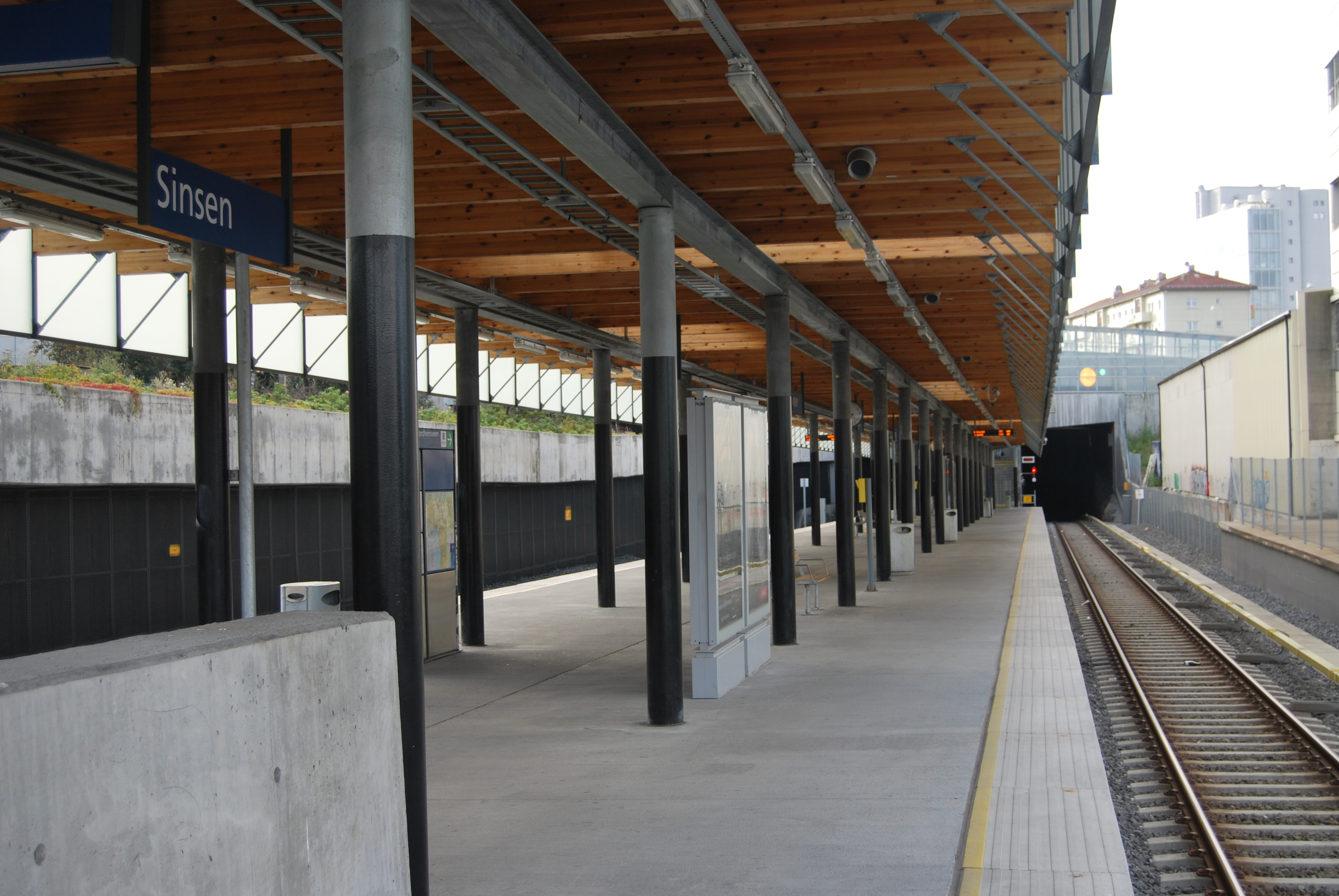
Sinsen Stasjon in Oslo

The Oslo Package 2 (Norwegian: Oslopakke 2) or O2 is a political agreement for financing investments in public transport in Oslo and Akershus, Norway. The program ran from 2001 to 2011, and includes many large and small investments in railways, the Oslo Tramway, the Oslo Metro and infrastructure for buses. Total budget is 15.6 billion kr. The project is a cooperation between the transit authorities Oslo Sporveier and Stor-Oslo Lokaltrafikk, Oslo Municipality and Akershus County Municipality, and the government agencies of the Norwegian National Rail Administration and the Norwegian Public Roads Administration.

Large infrastructure projects include the Ring Line of the metro, along with new MX3000 rolling stock, and the new Asker- and Follo Lines of the national railways. Other projects include new train and bus stations, bus lanes and an upgrade of the Kolsås Line of the T-bane to metro standard. The project is a continuation of Oslo Package 1, that focuses on building motorways around Oslo. It will be supplemented by Oslo Package 3 that has both road and rail infrastructure in it.

== History ==
The first Oslo Package was initiated in 1986, when the politicians in Oslo and Akershus decided to use NOK 11 billion in road toll money to build a motorway network around the city. The company Fjellinjen was established to collect the money. 20% of the money in the first package went to public transport. In 1996 an initiative was started to create a similar project to finance infrastructure investments for public transport. The package was passed by the Oslo City Council and the Akershus County Council in 2001, and lasts until 2011.

In 2006, the Office of the Auditor General in a report criticized Oslo Package 2 for not being able to focus on increased public transport efficiency and sustainability, and also criticized lack of cooperation between the many participants, who failed to find an optimal portfolio of investments.

== Financing ==
The package was created to increase financing for public transport. Sources include a range of public and private funds, including redistribution along existing budgets. In addition to disposition of local and state funding, the package increased the road tolls by NOK 2 per car passing, and NOK 0.75 per passenger on all public transport in Oslo and Akershus. Table values in NOK billion:

Source	Amount
State railway budget—lines	9.1
State railway budget—stations	0.3
State grant—Fornebu	0.6
Property developers, Fornebu	0.5
Alternate use of state road budget	1.3
Local budgets	0.7
Road toll fees	1.8
Passenger payments for rolling stock	1.3
