= Storgata tram stop =

Oslo tram stop

Storgata
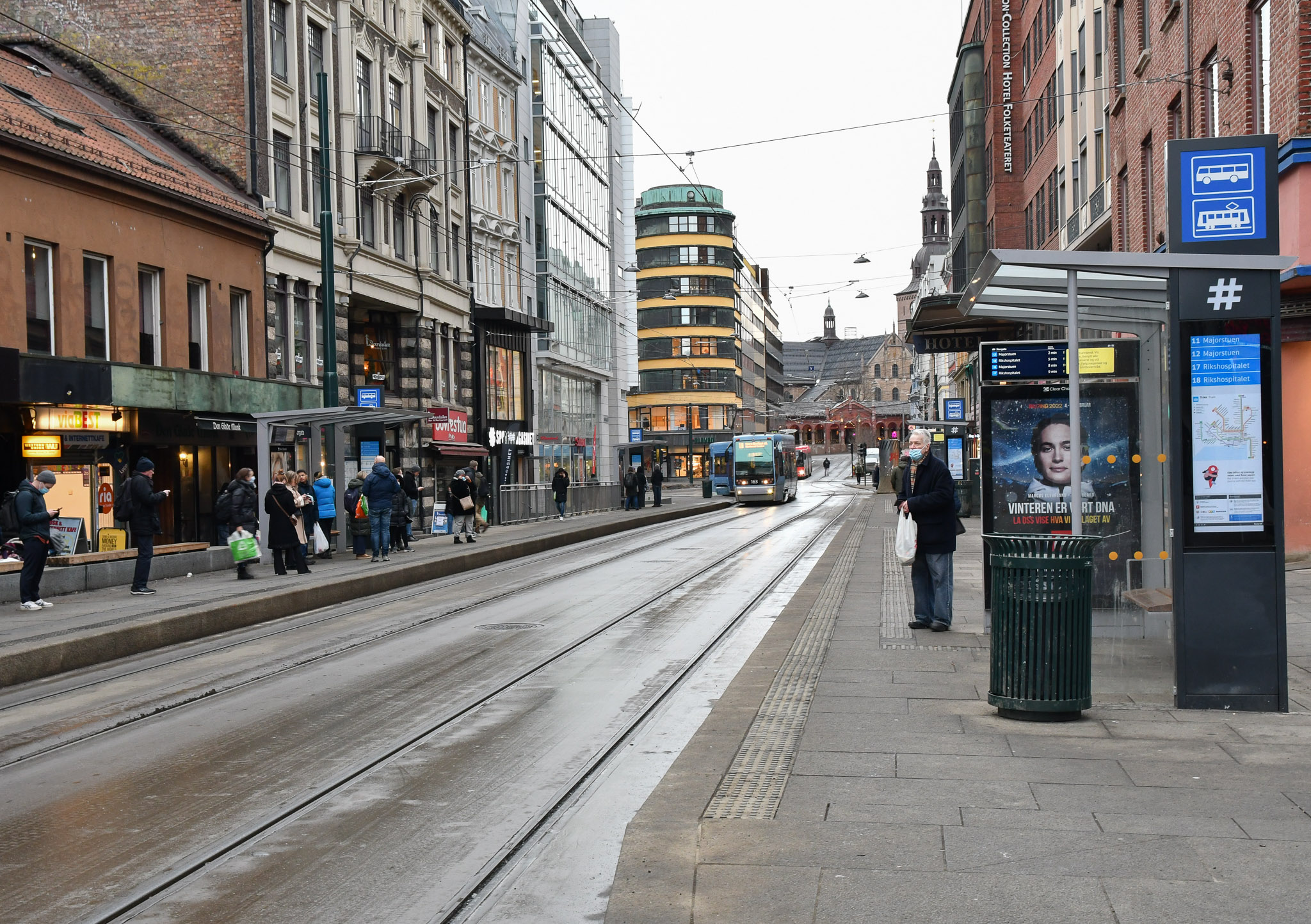
- A picture of Storgata tram station, looking towards Jernbanetorget station and Kirkeristen.

General information
- Location: Oslo; Norway
- Owner: Sporveien
- Operator: Sporveien Trikken
- Lines: Grünerløkka–Torshov Line; Sinsen Line
- Connections: Tram: Bus: 34, 54; Regional Buses: Hammersborggata

Other information
- Fare zone: Zone 1

History
- Opened: 21 June 2021

Services
Preceding station	Trams in Oslo	Following station
Jernbanetorget towards Majorstuen	Line 11	Nybrua towards Kjelsås
Jernbanetorget towards Majorstuen	Line 12	Nybrua towards Kjelsås
Jernbanetorget towards Rikshospitalet	Line 17	Nybrua towards Grefsen
Jernbanetorget towards Rikshospitalet	Line 18	Nybrua towards Grefsen
Route map
Location

Storgata tram stop is located on the Grünerløkka–Torshov Line and the Sinsen Line, between the stations of Jernbanetorget and Nybrua. It is served by four tram lines, two bus services and two night bus services. SL79, SL95 and SL18 trams serve the station. Storgata is also nearby the Folketeateret, which is a cultural theatre and the Gunerius shopping centre. It is also in close proximity to the Oslo Cathedral. There are Narvesen kiosks on both sides of the tram stop (they are not on the platforms.)

== History ==
Storgata was opened on 21 June 2021, and was accompanied by the closure of Lilletorget (a temporary tram station to replace the old station of Brugata). Storgata was constructed near the defunct tram station of Brugata, which closed in late 2019 for repairs. Trams first ran through the street of Storgata in October 1875, as part of the Gamlebyen Line to Gronland. These were horse-powered trams, the earliest type of tram. These preceded the electric trams that started operating in Oslo in the late 19th and early 20th century. Trams only went up to towards the north (i.e. Grünerløkka, Rodeløkka and Sinsen), after the Gamlebyen Line was shifted to run through Biskop Gunnerus gate in 1960.

== Reconstruction ==
The street of Storgata was renovated and rebuilt between November 2018 and June 2021, spanning a three year period. The causes for this is the quality of the street, with narrow sidewalks and poor road surface. It is also heavily trafficked and is prone to vehicle accidents. An example of this is that in 2014, a tram collided into a person. The injuries were fatal and the person died. In May 2018, the City Council approved the regulation plan to improve Storgata. Another factor is that throughout the city, various projects were adopted to improve the tracks in time for the new trams. A temporary tram route was established to bypass Storgata, this involved trams running through Hausmanns gate, Christian Kroghs gate and Stenersgata, with a temporary stop at Lilletorget. Then they would reconnect with the existing tracks in front of the Oslo City shopping centre.
