= Nybrua tram stop =

Tram station in Oslo, Norway

Nybrua
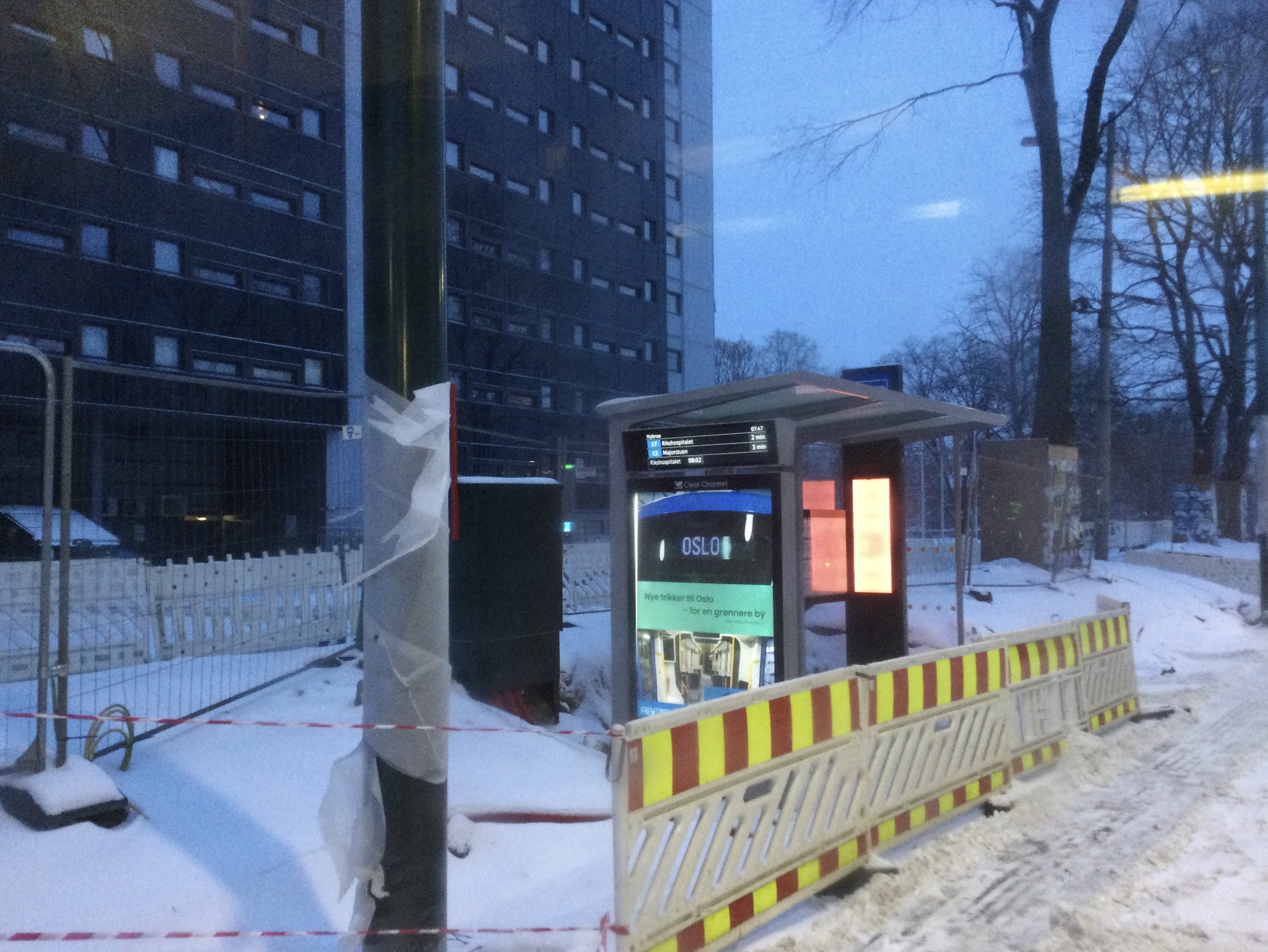
- Nybrua station

General information
- Location: Oslo; Norway
- Coordinates: 59.9170687°N 10.7583409°E
- Owner: Sporveien
- Operator: Sporveien Trikken
- Lines: Grünerløkka–Torshov Line; Sinsen Line
- Tracks: Double
- Connections: Tram:

Other information
- Fare zone: Zone 1

History
- Opened: 15 February 2021

Services
Preceding station	Trams in Oslo	Following station
Storgata towards Majorstuen	Line 11	Schous plass towards Kjelsås
Storgata towards Majorstuen	Line 12	Schous plass towards Kjelsås
Storgata towards Rikshospitalet	Line 17	Heimdalsgata towards Grefsen
Storgata towards Rikshospitalet	Line 18	Schous plass towards Grefsen
Route map
Location

Nybrua is a tram station which was opened in February 2021. It is served by lines 11, 12, 17 and 18. It is located near where the old tram station, Hausmanns gate stood. It is located between Storgata (westbound) and Schous plass (Grünerløkka-Torshov Line) and Heimdalsgata (Sinsen Line). It is served with both SL79 and SL95 trams. SL18 trams also serve the station on routes 17 and 18.

== History ==
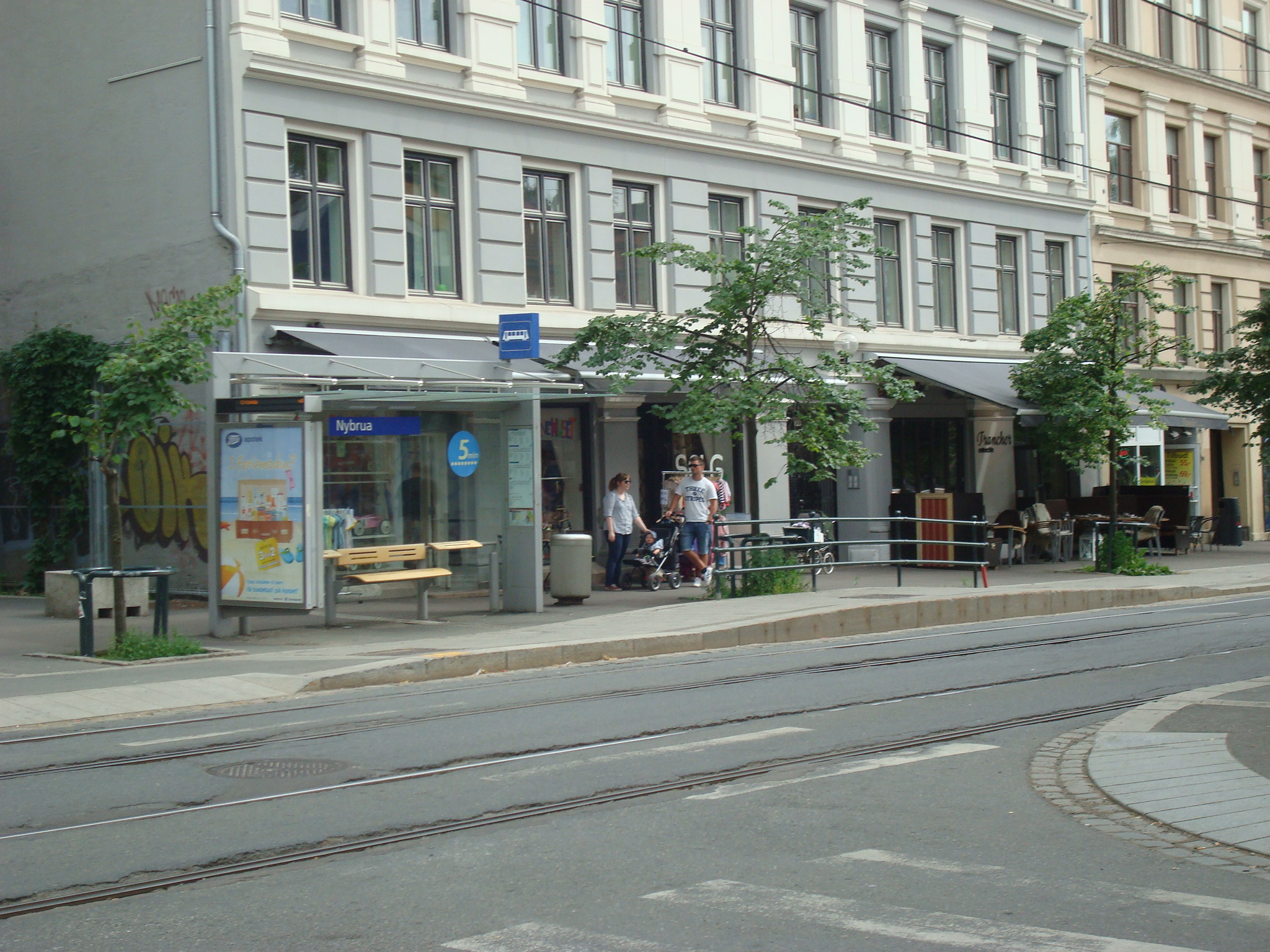
This is the eastbound platform at the original Nybrua station.

In the past, a station called Nybrua was served by lines 11, 12 and 13 and it was located on Thorvald Meyers gate. It was closed temporarily in 2012 and again in 2015 permanently due to its proximity to other stations nearby. In the late 2010s, the street of Storgata was closed for repair and Hausmanns gate was disestablished in the process. Between 2018 and 2021, a replacement tram track was constructed and Lilletorget was created, which temporarily replaced both Brugata and Hausmanns gate. On the 15th of February, the current stop outside of the former Legevakten was opened.
