= Schous plass =

Square in Oslo, Norway

Coordinates: 59°55′14″N 10°45′37″E

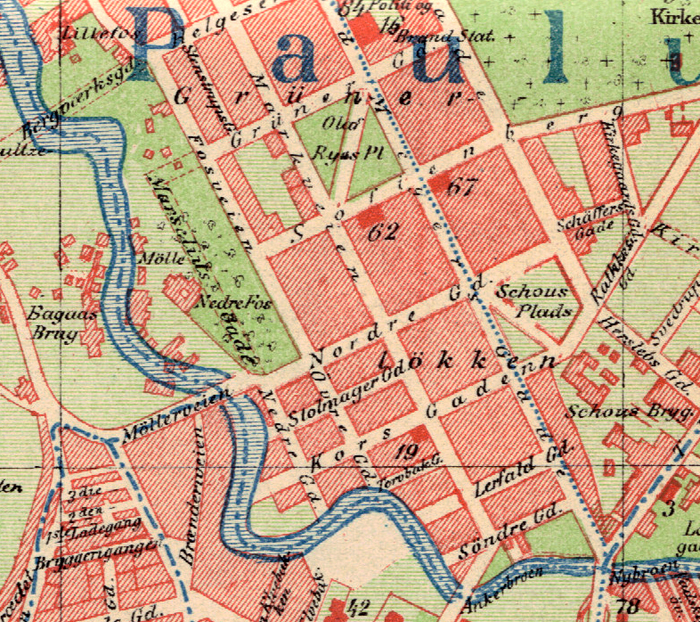
Map of the district, 1900. "Schous Plads" (archaic spelling) is near the right edge.

Schous plass (Schou Square) is a square in the southern part of the borough of Grünerløkka in Oslo, Norway.

== History ==
The area belonged to Aker municipality until 1858, when it was incorporated into Christiania (Oslo). It was laid out in 1873, and got its name in 1874. Its namesake was brewery owner Christian Schou, who died in the same year. Not far away, at the property Schousløkken in the street Trondheimsveien, he had established production facilities of his company, the Schou Brewery, between 1872 and 1874. A park was established at the square between 1915 and 1916, and renovated in 1986.

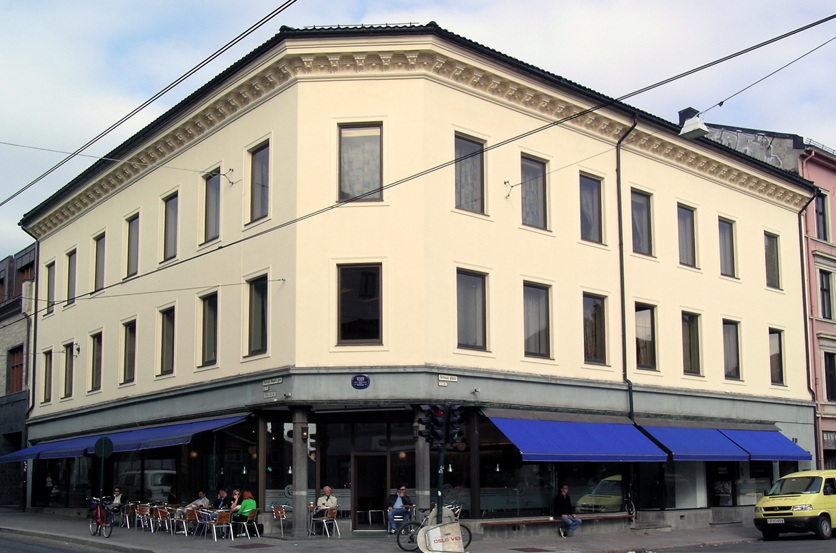
Schous plass 1.

The square is surrounded by four streets and buildings. The local library, administratively a satellite of the Deichman Library, was raised here between 1912 and 1914. A building for the Norwegian School of Marketing (Norwegian: Norges Markedshøyskole) was erected between 1989 and 1990. This institution was incorporated into the Norwegian School of Management in 1992, an institution which had its headquarters in Sandvika at the time, and only a satellite at Schous plass. The Norwegian School of Management concentrated its Oslo and Sandvika institutions into one school at Nydalen in 2005. Among the most notable residents of the buildings at Schous plass are a young adult Edvard Munch, who lived at the address Schous plass 1 from 1885 to 1889.

== Transport ==
Schous plass is a tram stop on the Grünerløkka–Torshov Line of the Oslo Tramway. It is served by lines 11, 12 and 18. The stop is served by high-floor SL79 trams and the low-floor SL95 and SL18 trams. The square is not directly served by bus, but is served by a night bus service.

Preceding station	Trams in Oslo	Following station
Nybrua towards Majorstuen	Line 11	Olaf Ryes plass towards Kjelsås
Nybrua towards Majorstuen	Line 12	Olaf Ryes plass towards Kjelsås
Nybrua towards Rikshospitalet	Line 18	Olaf Ryes plass towards Grefsen
