= Disen =

Neighborhood in Oslo, Norway

Coordinates: 59.9436°N 10.7909°E

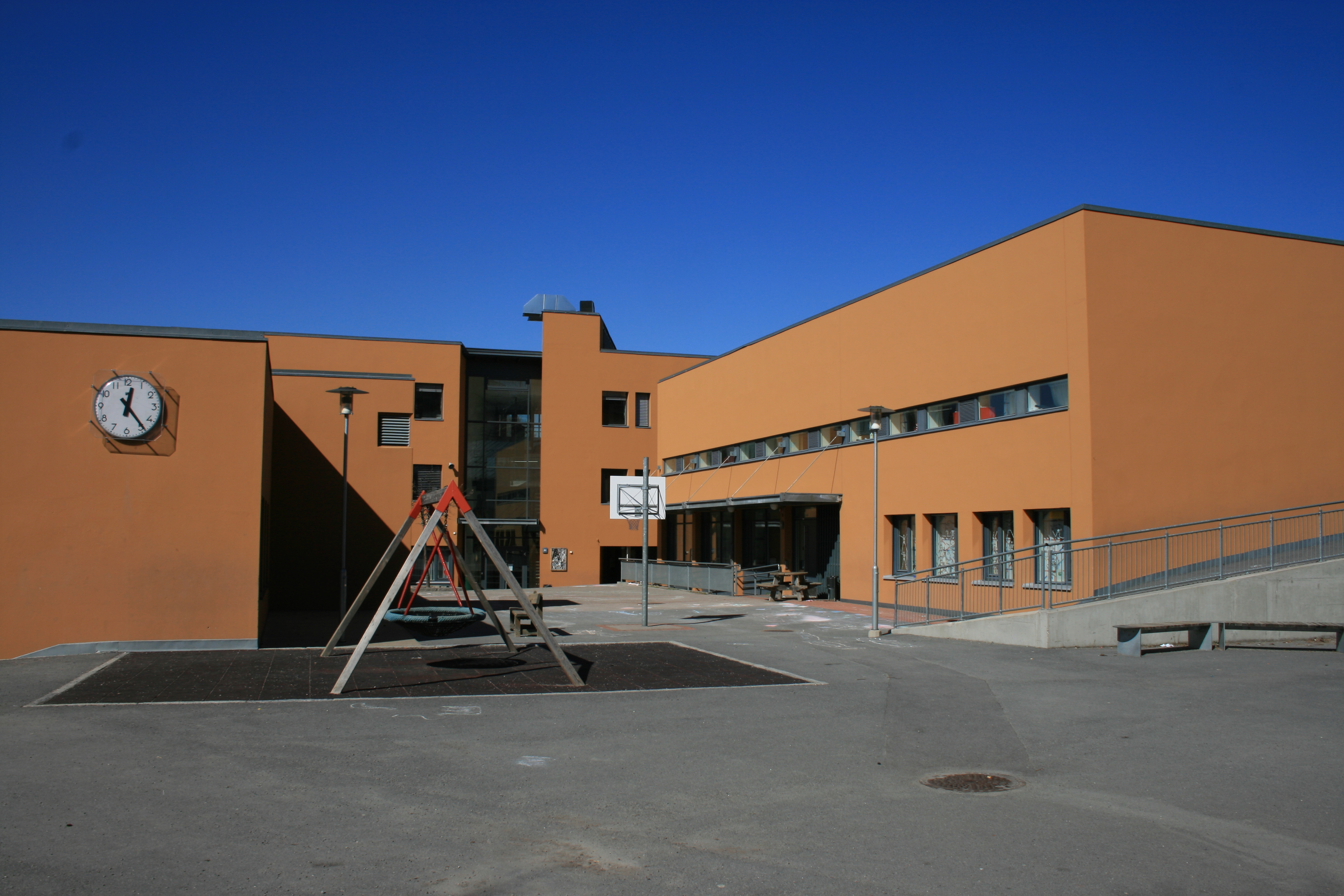
Disen School, which technically is located within Grefsen, not Disen.

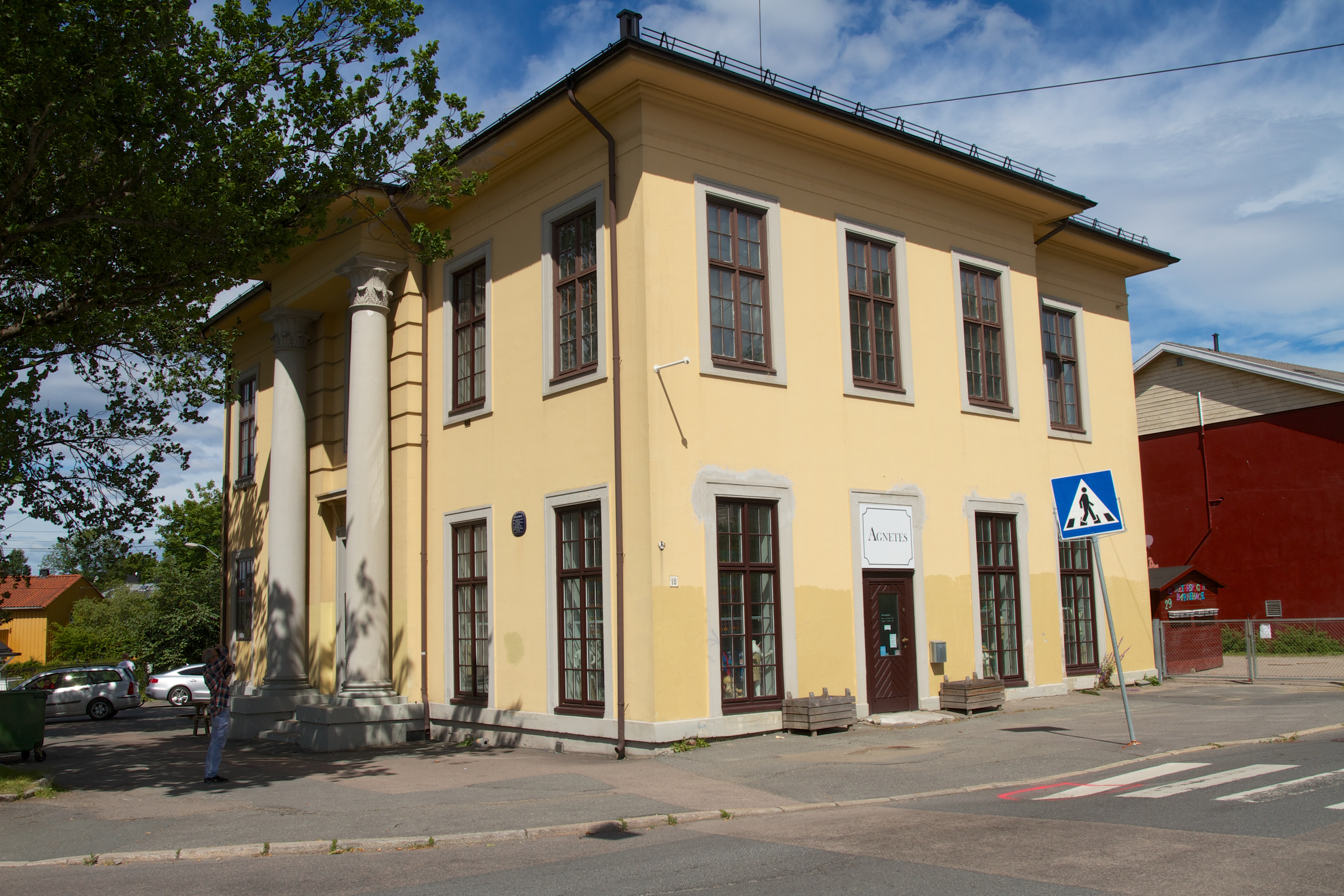
Grefsen and Disen Community House.

Disen is a neighborhood divided between the boroughs of Bjerke and Nordre Aker in Oslo, Norway.

Disen was originally a manor south of Grefsenåsen. The name stems from dís in Norse mythology.

Disen farm was parceled out as a residential area from 1918, with a major surge in building construction form the 1950s.

== Transport ==
The Disen tram stop on the Kjelsås Line (Kjelsåsbanen) is served by tram lines 11 & 12. 11 and 12 serve Disen regularly. The trams are all served with the older SL79 trams. There are also night buses that serve the area during the night.
