= Disen tram stop =

Tram stop in Oslo, Norway

Coordinates: 59.94635°N 10.78767°E

Disen
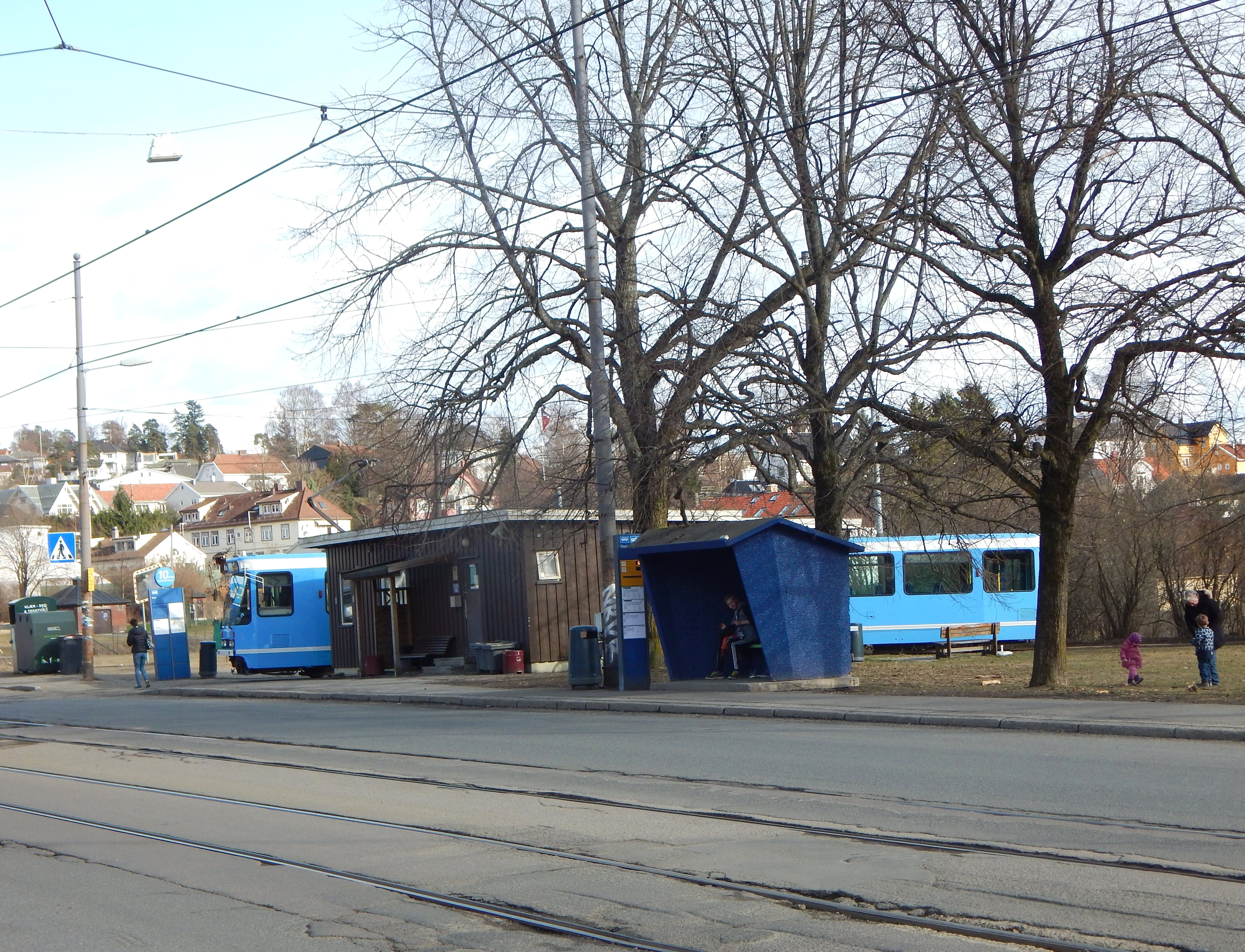
- Disen station with a SL79 tram on the balloon loop.

General information
- Location: Nordre Aker, Oslo; Norway
- System: Tram Station
- Operator: Sporveien Trikken
- Line: Kjelsås Line

History
- Opened: 25 September 1934

Services
Preceding station	Trams in Oslo	Following station
Storo towards Majorstuen	Line 11	Doktor Smiths vei towards Kjelsås
Storo towards Majorstuen	Line 12	Doktor Smiths vei towards Kjelsås
Route map
Location

Disen is a tram stop located on the Oslo Tramway network. Located in Nordre Aker in northern Oslo, the station is part of the Kjelsås Line, that operates between Storo and Kjelsås. Disen also has a balloon loop, for trams to turn around and change direction. However, trams do not regularly terminate at Disen anymore. Disen was opened on 25 September 1934. Disen was also closed along with the rest of the Kjelsås Line between 2002 and 2004. Uni-directional SL79 trams serve the tram stop, but occasionally SL95 trams serve Line 12.

== Service ==
Disen is served by Line 11 and Line 12 of the Oslo Tramway network. Line 11 and 12 both have their westbound terminus at Majorstuen and eastbound terminus of Kjelsås. Night bus routes 11N and 12N also serve the station during the night period which lasts between 2 AM and 6 AM. Disen is also approximately 600 metres from Storo's metro station and approximately 850 metres away from Grefsen railway station.

== Facilities ==
Disen has waiting shelters on both platforms. They are infitted with digital displays to show when the next tram will arrive at Disen. It also has a balloon loop, for trams to turn around and change direction. The balloon loop surrounds a 'resting room' that was built in 1942 and was designed by Kristofer Lange.

== Reconstruction ==
As part of the Fremtidens Byreise (Future City Travel) programme, the tram tracks on the Kjelsås Line were upgraded between 2018 and 2020. The reason for this was partly due to the purchase and procurement of the new SL18 trams to serve Oslo, but mainly because the street was in poor condition and heavily trafficked, as well. The aim was to rebuild, repair and replace the area's tram tracks and add new asphalt to the roads. The Kjelsas Line was closed in late 2018, and a replacement bus service (route 11B) was put into place. Trams on routes 11 and 12 terminated instead at Storo, where passengers could interchange with the replacement bus service. The tram route reopened and tram traffic to Kjelsas finally resumed.

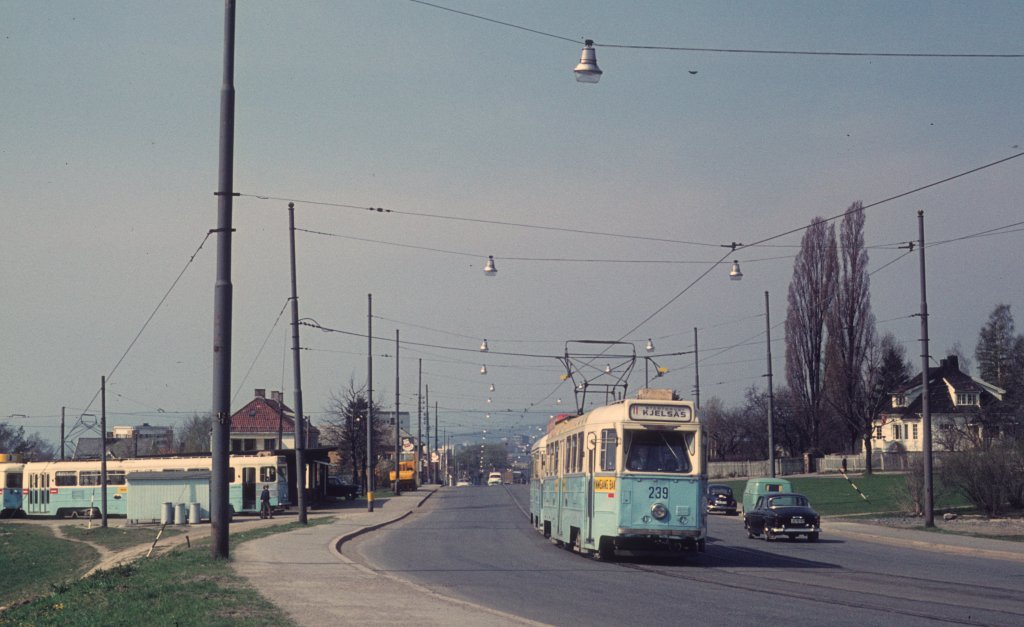
An SM53 tram at Disen in 1971. There is another tram on the balloon loop, as well.
