= Grefsen Depot =

Tram depot in Oslo

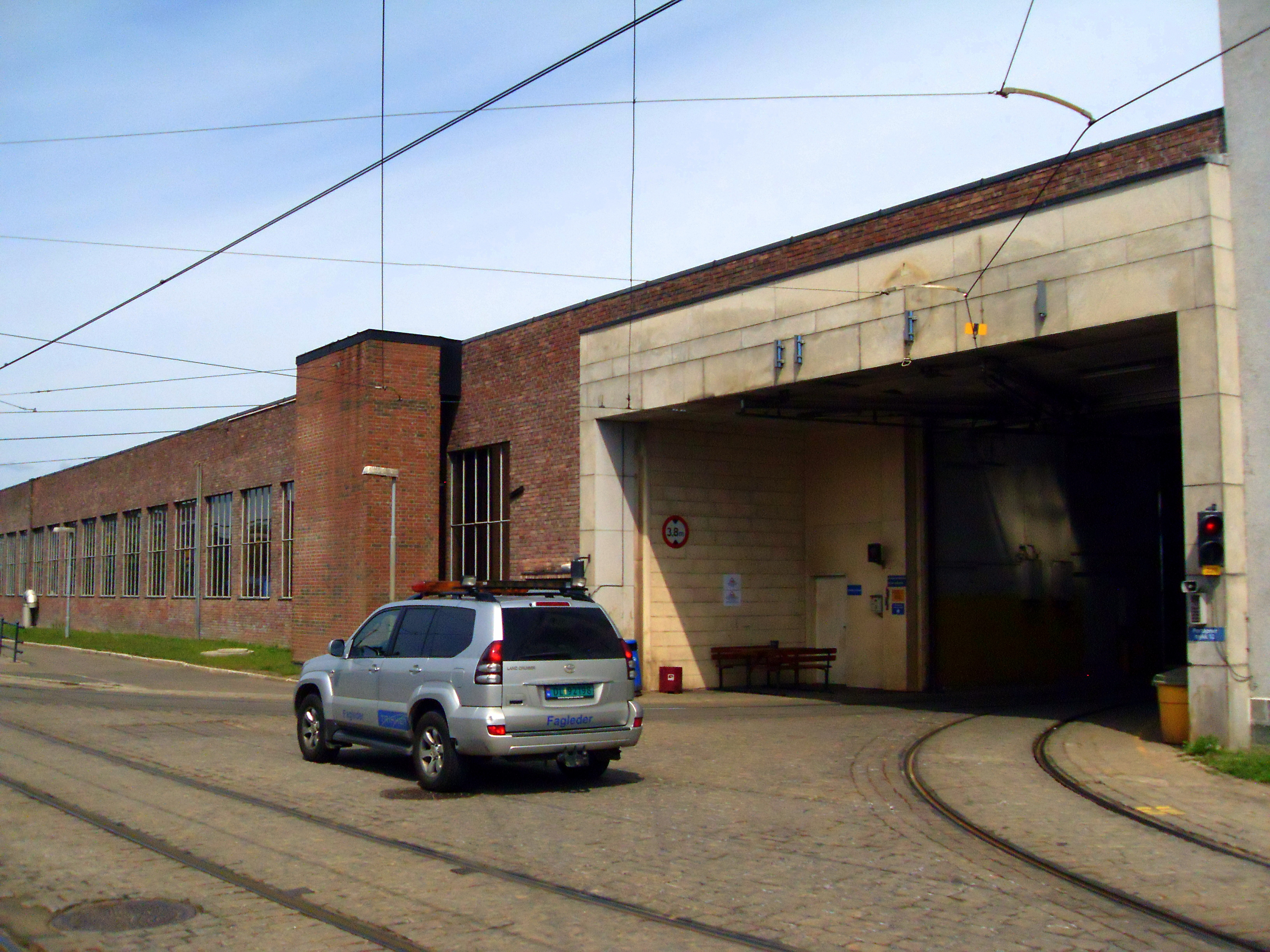
- Interactive map of Grefsen Depot

Location
- Location: Nordre Aker, Oslo, Norway
- Coordinates: 59°56′33″N 10°46′55″E

Characteristics
- Owner: Sporveien
- Operator: Sporveien Trikken
- Type: Electric tram
- Rolling stock: SL79, SL95 and SL18
- Routes served: (Sinsen Line) (Grunerlokka-Torshov Line)

History
- Opened: 1957
- Former rolling stock: Gullfisk, SM53 and SM91

Grefsen Depot is a tram depot located next to the Grefsen station tram stop (the terminus of lines 17 and 18). Grefsen Depot is one of the only tramway depots in Oslo, along with the Holtet depot, which is near the Holtet tram stop. The depot currently stores SL79, SL95 and SL18 trams after the daily operating period ends. The depot has also formerly stored the Høka, the SM90 and the SM91 rolling-stock. The entire depot takes up approximately 15, 000 square metres. The depot has an office for Sporveien Trikken (the company that operates the trams on the network), as well as an association office for Oslo Sporveiers Arbeiderforening's Streetcar Club (a club that organises a significant amount of job instructors, substitute officers and wagon drivers on the tram).

== History ==
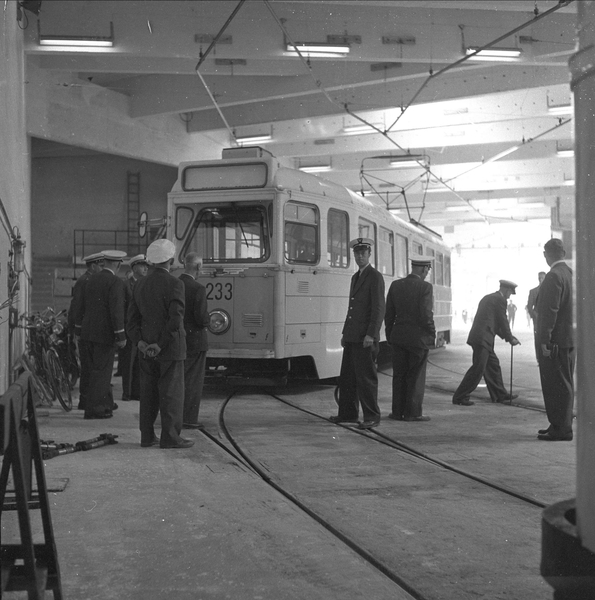
SM53 making the first test run inside of Grefsen Depot.

In the 1950s, there were plans to build a new, modern depot to replace the small, scattered depots across the city. The construction of the depot had lasted for about two years. On the 18th of August, 1956, SM53 tram no. 233 made the first test drive into the entrance portal of the new depot. The depot here was opened for regular use in 1957 and it replaced the depots at Torshov and Kjelsås. The depots at Homansbyen and Sagene became used for extra carriages until their eventual closures. It was designed by architect Georg Greve. A three-story office building was erected at the southern end of the facility. The depot was also formerly used as a bus garage until around 1980, when De Blå Omnibusser was taken over by Oslo Sporveier. The busses were shifted to a location in Alnabru. The depot originally had space to hold 100 carriages and 30 busses.

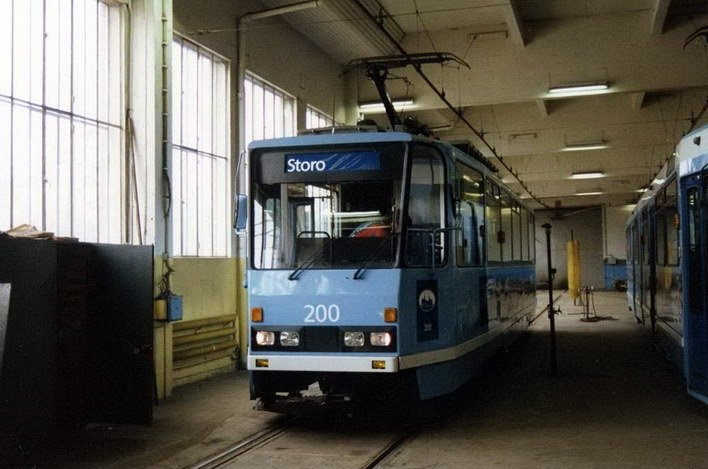
SM90 no.200 tram at Grefsen Depot, beside a SL79 tram.

The former bus garage was thereafter remodeled to become a tram workshop. The depot was rebuilt in 1982 and again between 1999 and 2000. The reason for this was the ordering of the low-floor SL95 trams. The most recent upgrade was between 2018 and 2021, in preparation for the arrival of the new SL18 trams. The publication of the contract award to CAF was at Grefsen Depot. According to Fremtidens Byreise, 44 of the new rolling-stock will be parked at Grefsen, while the rest are parked at Holtet's depot. On the 12th of October 2020, the first SL18 tram was unveiled to the public.

== Facilities ==
The depot has multiple tracks and contact-wires for trams to move about and be parked. The tracks were lengthened to accommodate the new SL18 trams, which are longer than the former rolling-stock. A rectifier ensures that the depot has a stable and secure power supply. As part of the recent reconstruction, a new machine (which washes the exterior of the trams) was installed, the catenary system and tracks were replaced and heating was converted from oil to district heating. There are also lifting bays, compressed air systems and cranes.

== Location ==
The depot is located along Kjelsåsveien, a road that begins at the Sinsen Interchange and terminates in Brekke. The depot is across Grefsen railway station, but is separated by Storoveien (a part of Ring 3, a highway that circumnavigates the city of Oslo.) Its official address is Storoveien 25. The depot is (in general) located in the borough of Nordre Aker, in Oslo, Norway.

== See also ==
- Oslo tramway network
- Grefsen station
- SL79, SL95 and SL18
- Sporveien Trikken
