= Olaf Ryes plass tram stop =

Tram stop in Oslo, Norway

Olaf Ryes plass
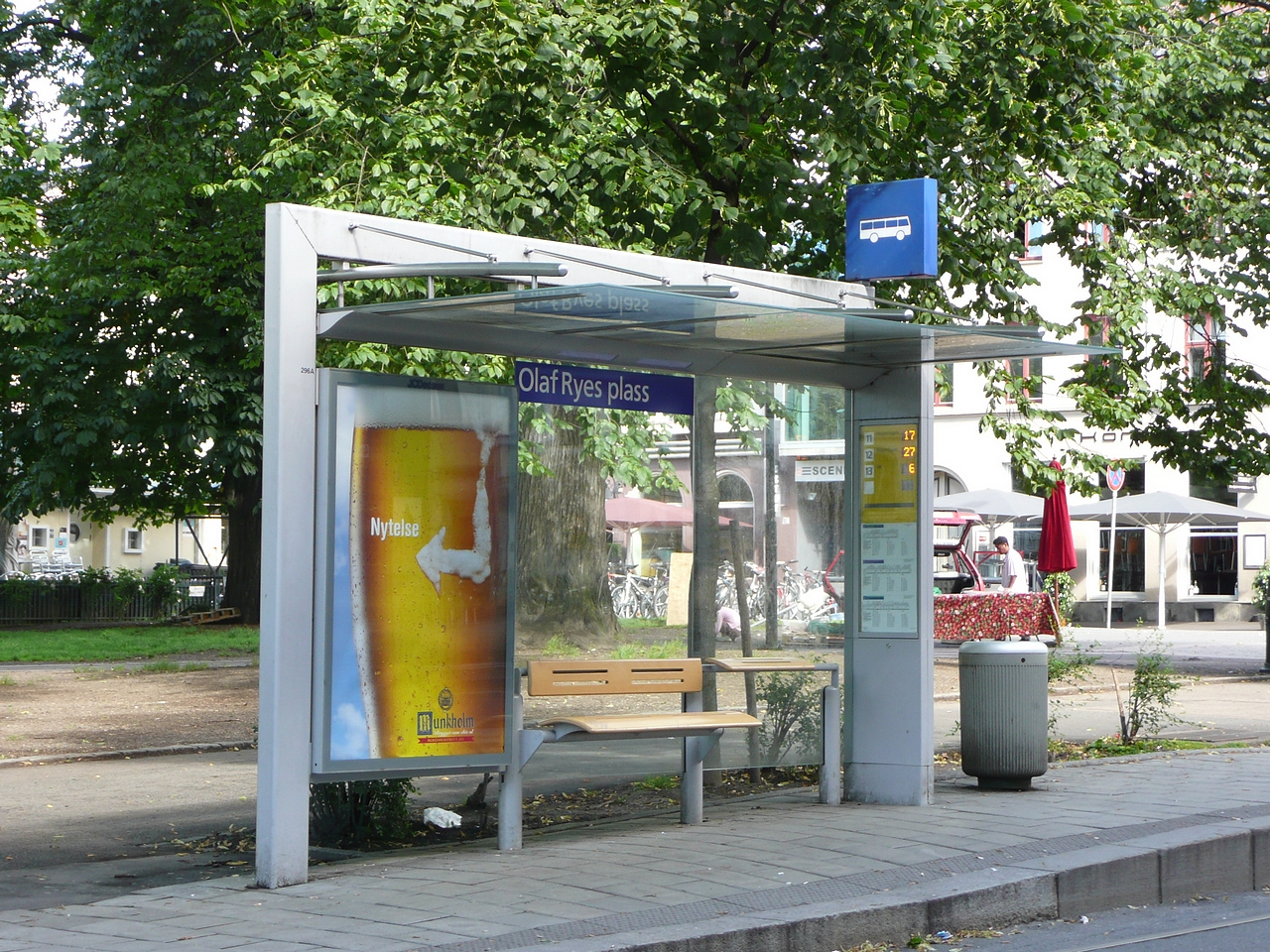

General information
- Location: Grünerløkka, Oslo; Norway
- Coordinates: 59.9231°N 10.7592°E
- Line: Grünerløkka–Torshov Line

Services
Preceding station	Trams in Oslo	Following station
Schous plass towards Majorstuen	Line 11	Birkelunden towards Kjelsås
Schous plass towards Majorstuen	Line 12	Birkelunden towards Kjelsås
Schous plass towards Rikshospitalet	Line 18	Birkelunden towards Grefsen
Location

Olaf Ryes plass is a tram stop on the Grünerløkka–Torshov Line of the Oslo Tramway. It is served by lines 11, 12, and 18. The night bus routes (11N and 12N) do not directly serve the station, but instead stop at a station nearby called Sofienbergparken. The demolished Grunerlokka vognhall is located nearby at Thorvald Meyers gate 49, and grain trams ran on a branch line that separated from the Grünerløkka–Torshov Line after Olaf Ryes plass.
