= Grünerløkka–Torshov Line =

Tramway line in Norway

Overview
- Native name: Grünerløkka–Torshov-linjen
- Owner: Kollektivtransportproduksjon
- Locale: Oslo, Norway
- Termini: Jernbanetorget; Grefsen

Service
- Type: Tramway
- System: Oslo Tramway
- Operator(s): Oslo Sporvognsdrift
- Rolling stock: SL79, SL95 and SL18

History
- Opened: 1878

Technical
- Number of tracks: Double
- Track gauge: 1,435 mm (4 ft 8 1/2 in)
- Electrification: formerly 600 V DC, currently 750 V DC
- Operating speed: 50 kilometres per hour (31 mph)

The Grünerløkka–Torshov (Norwegian: Grünerløkka–Torshov-linjen) is a tramway line running between Jernbanetorget to Storo in Oslo, Norway. It is served by lines 11, 12 and 18 of the Oslo Tramway. The line serves the city-centre of Oslo, Grunerlokka and Sagene. The line is currently served by SL79, SL95 and SL18 trams.

The line was built by Kristiania Sporveisselskap and opened for horsecars in 1878 from Stortorvet to Grünerløkka, and was extended on 12 April 1879 to St. Halvards Plass. Electrification occurred in 1899, with a further extension to Grefsen Station in 1902. There was also a former depot near Olaf Ryes plass tram stop (at Thorvald Meyers gate 49). In 1934, the Kjelsås Line was constructed; branching off at Storo, going through Disen and the suburbs of Kjelsås, before terminating at Kjelsås tram stop. Between 1988 and 1998, the trams to Sagene ran via the Grünerløkka Line and they branched off after Torshov tram station.
