= Kjelsås =

Neighbourhood in Nordre Aker, Oslo, Norway

Coordinates: 59°57′50″N 10°47′05″E

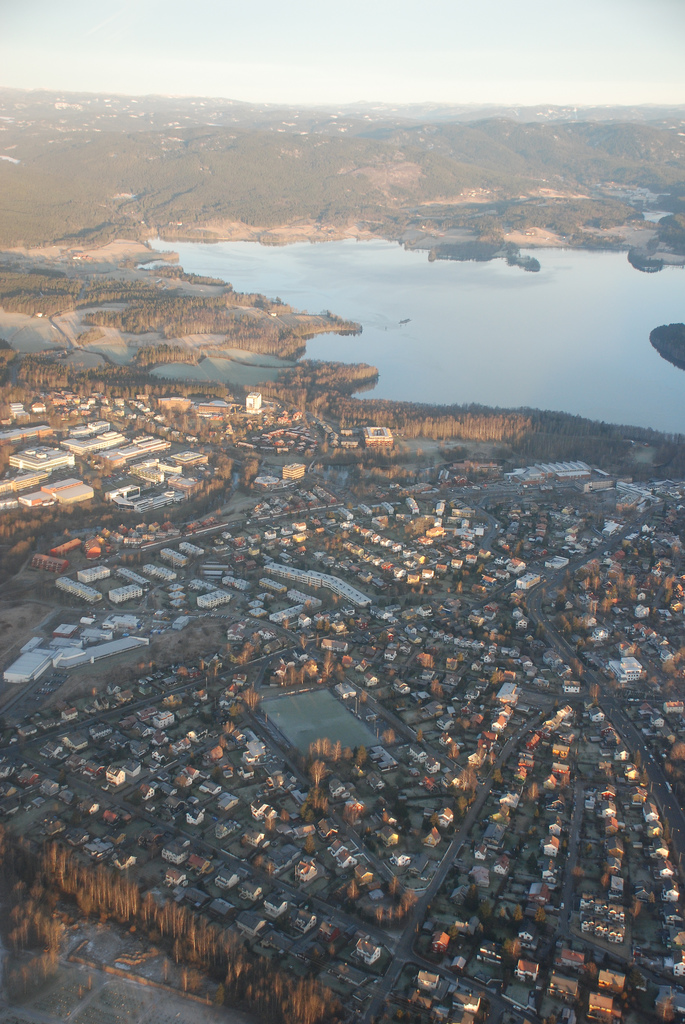

Kjelsås, sometimes called Kjelsaas, is one of the northern neighbourhoods of Oslo situated in Nordre Aker, the northern borough of Oslo, Norway.

== History ==
Together with Grefsen, Kjelsås was part of the borough Grefsen-Kjelsås until January 1 2004, when they both became part of the new borough of Nordre Aker. Grefsen and Kjelsås were also part of the former municipality of Aker before the second world war, when the City of Oslo was confined to today's central areas. Prior to this, Kjelsås was a former forest and agriculture area and had an old sawmill industry.

== Geography ==
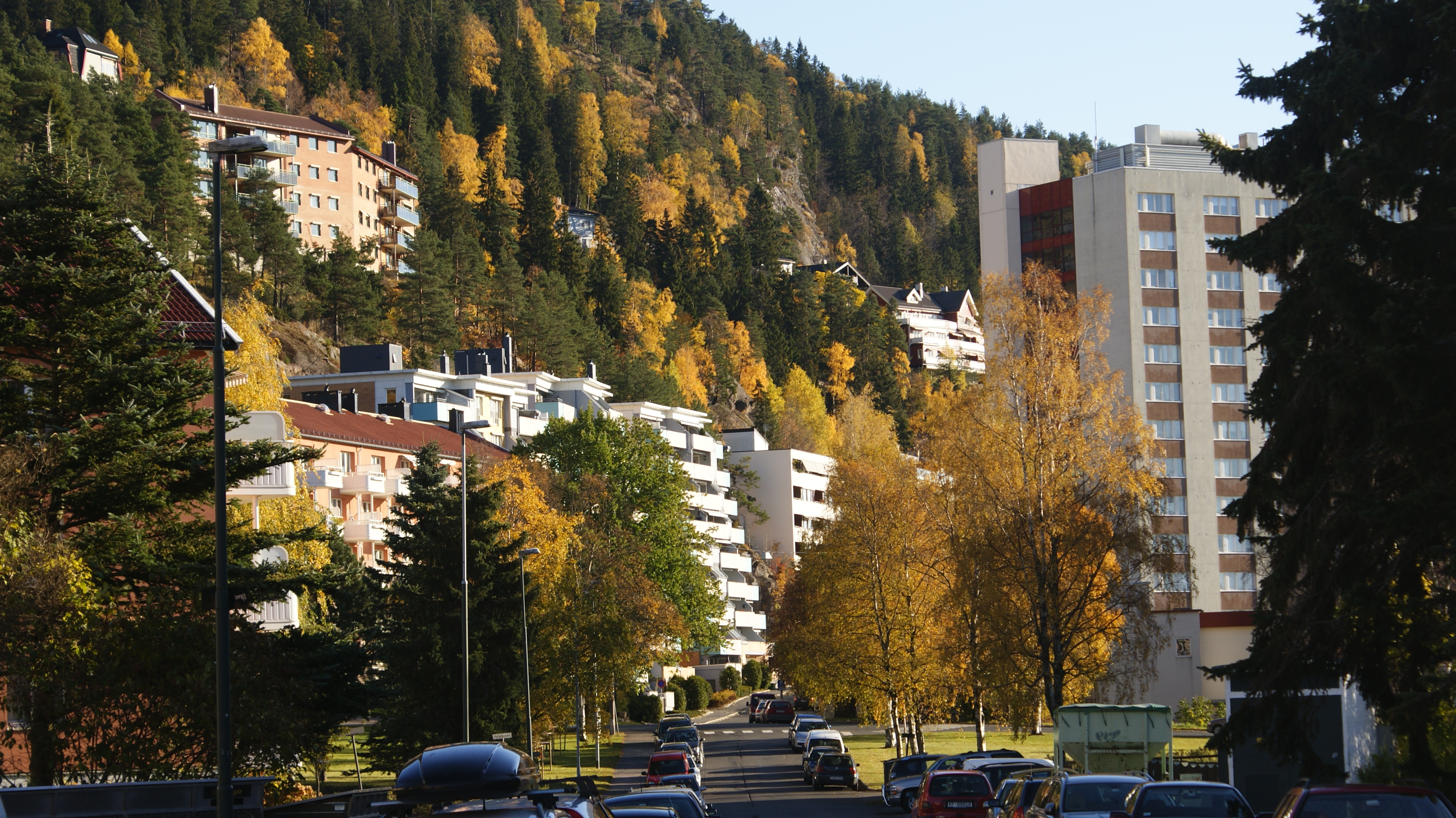
Kurveien and the urbanized slope of Lachmannsfjell (364m)

The district of Kjelsås offers ski jumps, slalom slopes and vast woodland areas for hiking. Lake Maridalsvannet, located close to the woodlands, provides Oslo with its drinking water and is also the source of the Akerselva river, (formerly Frysjaelven). Akerselva is the dividing line between many areas of Oslo including the northern suburbs. Traditionally seen as Eastern or Western Oslo depending on which side of the river one is on. This distinction is even found in the name of the river. Akerselva (East) and Akerselven (West). However, although located east of the river, Kjelsås is often not defined as "west" or "east" side but neutral.

== Structures ==
The Norwegian Museum of Science and Technology was moved to Kjelsås in 1986. The museum complex has a total of 20,000 m² floor space. Adjacent to the museum lies Kjelsås Station which is a station of the Gjøvik Line. The Kjelsås Line is served by the Oslo Tramway routes 11 and 12.

== Sports clubs ==
The sports club Kjelsås IL has football-, handball- and basketball-teams. The elite football team, Kjelsås Fotball has their stadium at Grefsen, called "Grefsen stadion". Myrer IL is the local volleyball club of Kjelsås.

== People from Kjelsås ==
- Kristian Kjelling, handball player
- Wenche Myhre, singer and actress
- Johan Golden, comedian, former politician and radio/television presenter
- Kristian Skylstad, artist
- Jan Christensen, artist
- Ida Ekblad, artist
- Truls Heggero, artist
- Frode Olav Olsen Urkedal, chess player
- Eirik Brandsdal, cross country skier
