= Kjelsås Line =

Tramway line in Oslo, Norway

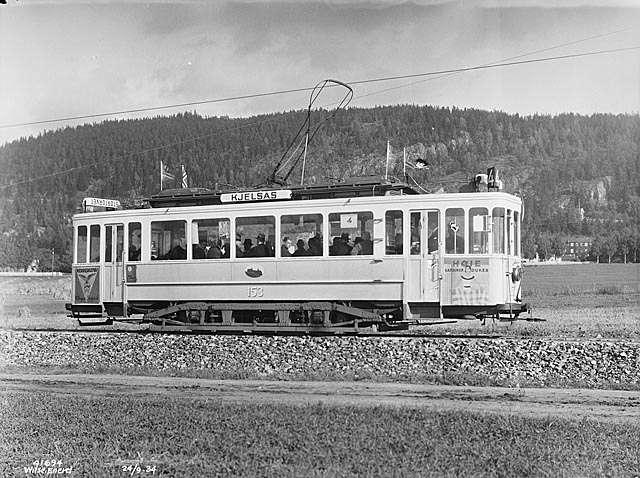
- A tram on the Kjelsås Line in 1934

Overview
- Native name: Kjelsåsbanen
- Owner: Kollektivtransportproduksjon
- Locale: Oslo, Norway
- Termini: Storo; Kjelsås

Service
- Type: Tramway
- System: Oslo Tramway
- Operator(s): Oslo Sporvognsdrift
- Rolling stock: SL79

History
- Opened: 25 September 1934

Technical
- Number of tracks: Double
- Track gauge: 1,435 mm (4 ft 8 1/2 in)
- Electrification: 750 V DC
- Operating speed: 50 kilometres per hour (31 mph)

The Kjelsås Line (Norwegian: Kjelsåsbanen) is a tramway line running from Storo to Kjelsås in the northern part of Oslo, Norway. The line opened by Oslo Sporveier on 25 September 1934 as an extension of the Grünerløkka–Torshov Line that terminated at Storo. It is served by line 11 and 12 of the Oslo Tramway operated by Oslo Sporvognsdrift. The line was built as a suburban tramway, but has since been transformed to partially run in the streets.

On 21 November 2002 the owner Oslo Sporveier closed the Kjelsås Line—replacing the tram with a feeder bus to save costs of the maintenance of the tramway. The line was reopened on 22 November 2004 after local protests, and a compromise in the city council.
