= SL18 =

Articulated tramcar class in Oslo, Norway

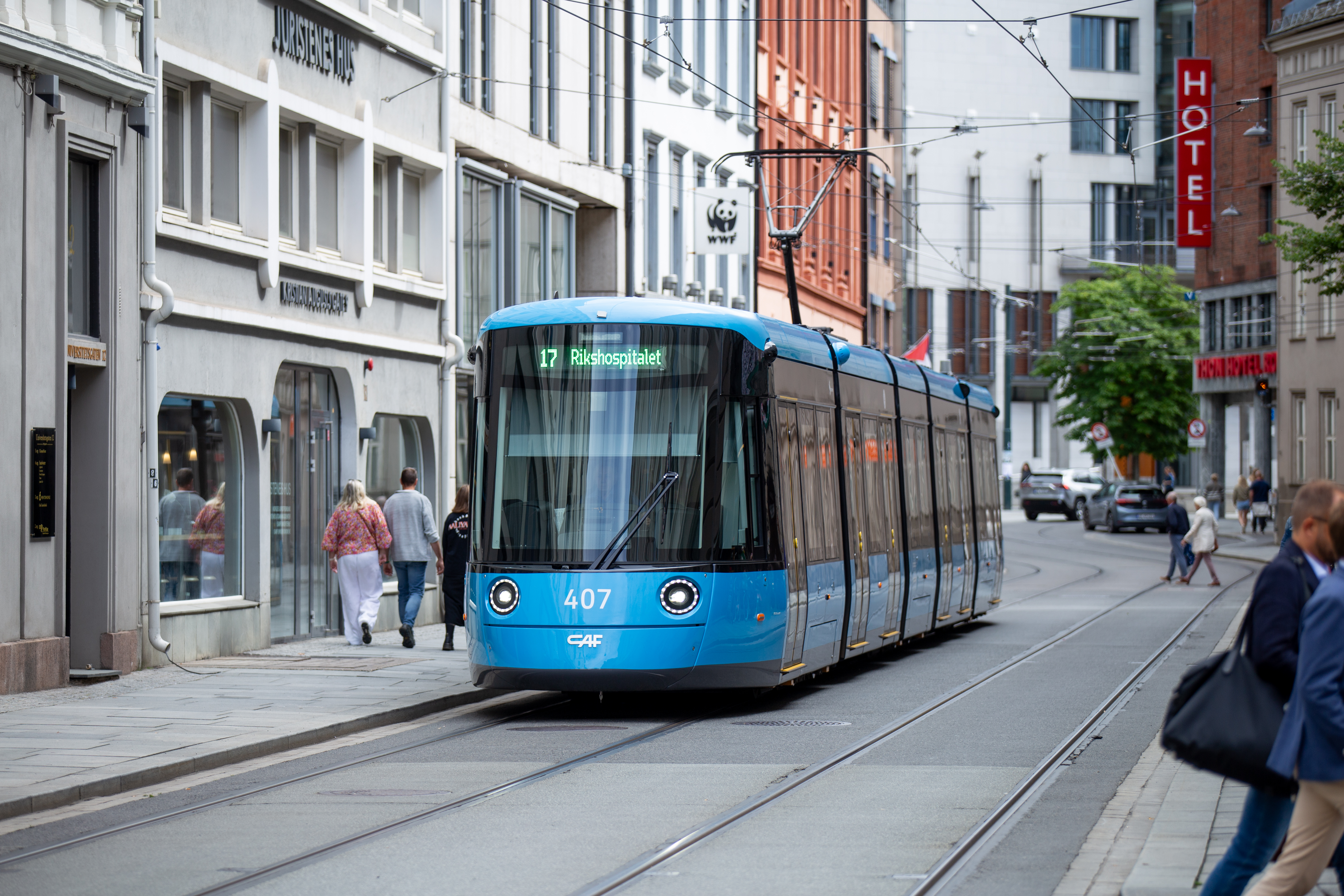
- SL18 no. 407 running as line 17 at Tullinløkka, 2023
- In service: 2022–present
- Manufacturer: CAF
- Built at: Beasain, Spain
- Family name: Urbos 100
- Replaced: SL79 & SL95
- Entered service: 2022
- Number under construction: 87 (total)
- Fleet numbers: 401–487
- Capacity: 220 passengers
- Owner: Sporveien Vognmateriell
- Operator: Sporveien Trikken
- Depots: Grefsen, Holtet
- Lines served: 13, 17, 18 and 19

Specifications
- Car body construction: Aluminium
- Train length: 34,166 mm (112 ft 1.1 in)
- Width: 2.65 m (8 ft 8 in)
- Height: 3.65 m (12 ft 0 in)
- Floor height: 356 mm (14.0 in)
- Low-floor: 100%
- Doors: 6 per side (12 in total)
- Maximum speed: 70 km/h (43 mph)
- Traction motors: 8 × TSA TMR 36-18-4 70 kW (94 hp)
- Power output: 560 kW (750 hp)
- Electric systems: 750 V DC overhead catenary
- Current collection: Pantograph
- UIC classification: Bo′+0′+2′+0′+Bo′
- Seating: Transverse
- Track gauge: 1,435 mm (4 ft 8 1/2 in) standard gauge

The SL18 (short for Sporvogn Ledd, commissioned in 2018) is a series of 87 low-floor, articulated trams currently being phased-in on the Oslo Tramway network. They will continue to be phased-in until 2025, when the last SL79s and SL95s are replaced. They were purchased from the Spanish tram manufacturer, CAF. The first one was shipped and unveiled at Grefsen depot in 2020, and regular operation begun in 2022. The entire purchase has a price of 4.2 billion kroner. There is also a possibility of acquiring another 60 more trams from CAF.

== History ==
By 2009, it was recognised that the city of Oslo needed new trams and that the rail infrastructure needed to be upgraded. In 2013, the City Council of Oslo initiated the tram program. The responsibility of procurement was transferred to Sporveien in August 2015. In December 2015, the Council approved the procurement of 87 new trams. Also in December 2015, the pre-qualification of suppliers began and the potential suppliers were announced in March 2016. The pre-qualification stage ended with six suppliers being invited tenders. Including the winner, there were five other selections:

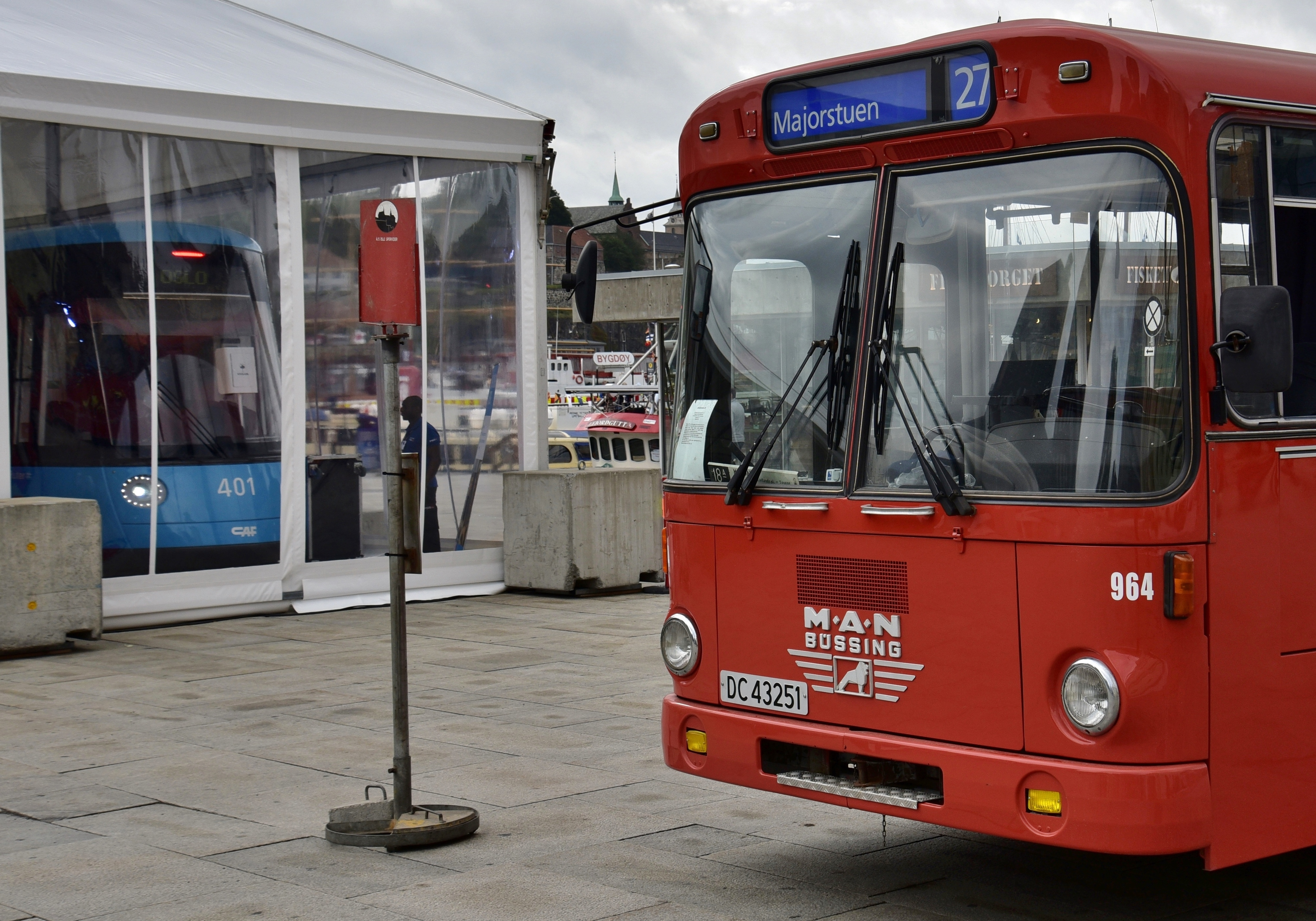
Model of the SL18 tram is seen left.

- Alstom
- Bombardier
- Škoda
- Stadler
- Siemens

On 30 March 2017, the submit deadline passed and the evaluation process begun. A year later, on the 18th June 2018, Sporveien awarded a contract to CAF. On 28 August 2019, a full-scale model of the new tram was unveiled at Rådhusplassen (City Hall Square).

In 2020, after the outbreak of COVID-19, the production of trams in Spain was temporarily halted. Nonetheless, on 19 September 2020, the first tram arrived from Spain, as was unloaded at the port of Drammen. It was unveiled the next month at Grefsen depot. There was a testing period on Line 13 between Skøyen and Bråten in early 2022, before being put to use on Line 17 and Line 18, between Rikshospitalet and Grefsen station, starting from April 2022.

However in early 2023, there a problem with the delivery of the trams occurred. CAF notified Sporveien that there were challenges in obtaining and acquiring the necessary parts. This was due to a worldwide shortage of parts, which was also affected by the end of the COVID-19 pandemic and the Russo-Ukrainian War. This means that new trams were temporarily not delivered to Oslo. However, they resumed deliveries not long afterwards.

On the 24th of November, Sporveien announced that the twenty-nine SL18 trams that are currently operating in Oslo have travelled 1 million kilometres combined. In early 2024, Sporveien was awarded DOGA's Innovasjonsprisen for inkluderende design (transl. Innovation Award for Inclusive Design) for the new trams.

== Fremtidens byreise program ==
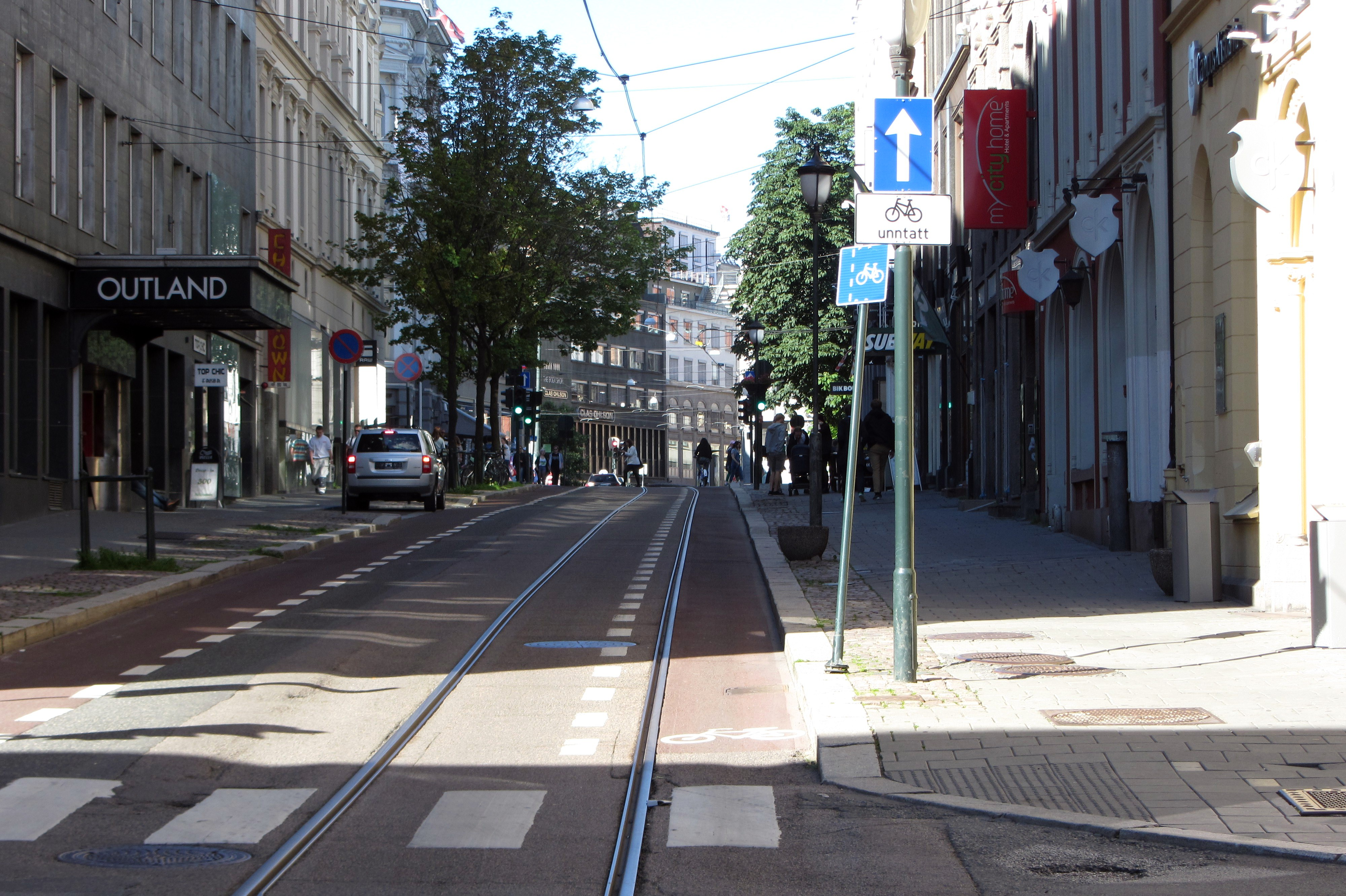
The single track in Kirkegata before the upgrading project in 2014.

The Fremtidens byreise (lit. "The Future City Travel") program was initiated as part of the tram program in 2013. In 2015, the City Council approved the procurement of new trams and along with it, the modernization of the current system's infrastructure. This involved the upgrading of Oslo's streets and tracks, and multiple old water and wastewater pipes were to be replaced.

The first building project begun in 2014, which was the upgrading and renovating Prinsens gate. The tracks were demolished and replaced in a two-way system. About 30 renovation projects followed suit across Oslo in the late 2010s. This unfortunately led to system closures, such as the one on the Kjelsås Line (which lasted approximately 2 years). According to the official website, one of their aims was to satisfy the requirements of universal design, making it easier for everyone to take the tram. One of their predictions, is that the amount of journeys taken by passengers taking the tram will double from 51 million to 100 million by 2030.

== Specifications ==
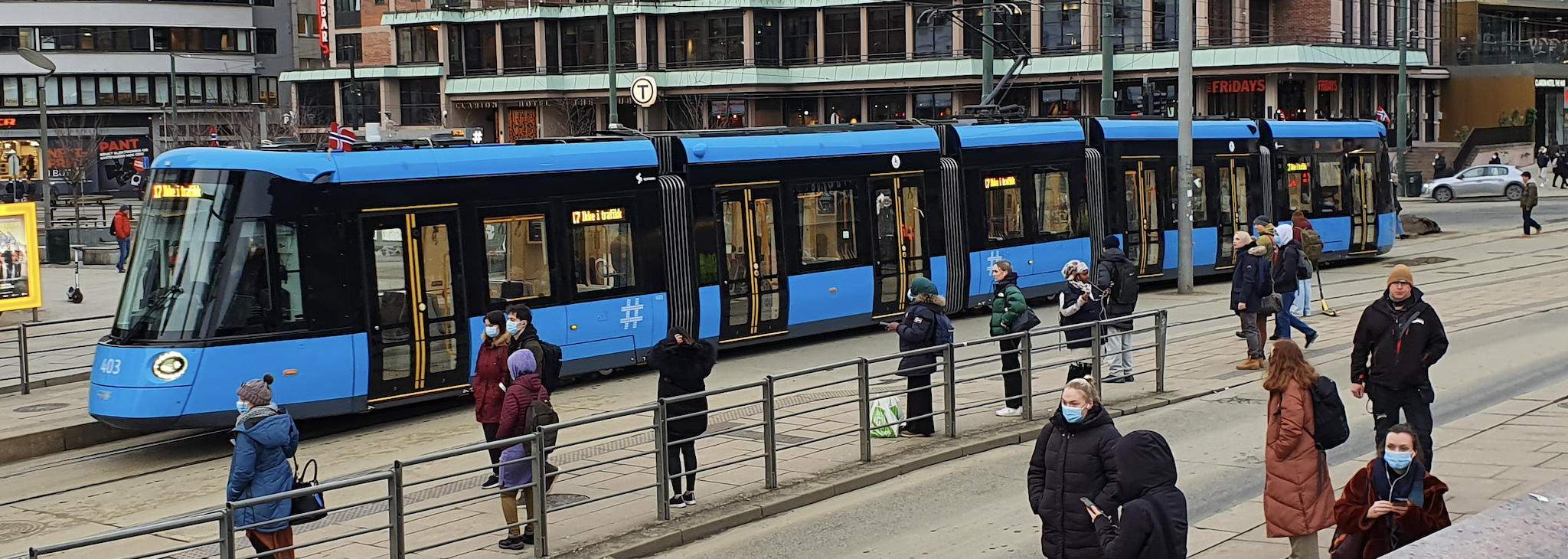
The SL18 trams have five segments.

The six-axle, five-segmented articulated tram can accommodate a maximum of 220 passengers. Two of these segments have no wheels supporting them. They are significantly lighter than the SL95s, weighing at just 43 tons, compared to the 65 tons of the SL95s. It is approximately 34 metres (111 ft 7 in) long, its width is 2.65 metres (8 ft 8 in) and its height is 3.65 metres (12 ft 0 in). The SL18 is a form of the Urbos 100 stock, which is also used in numerous other European cities. The exterior is in a blue colour that matches the previous stock.

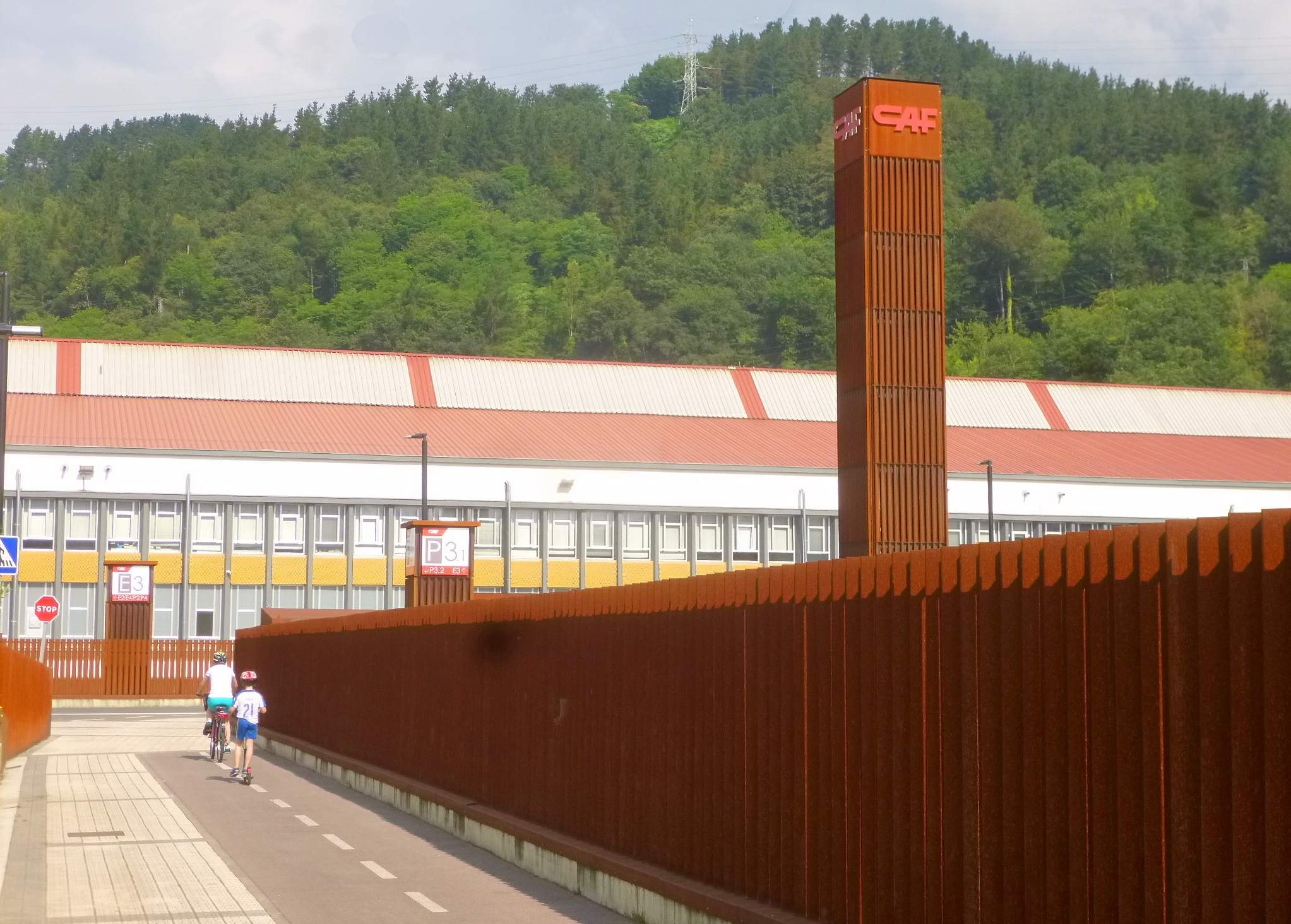
The factory in Beasain.

The tram is also entirely (100%) low-floor making it accessible to wheelchair users. This means that there are no stairs anywhere on the tram. The interior is infitted with a passenger information system to display the next tram stop, instead of the dot-matrix displays used on the former stock. There are also rectangular displays to show advertisements and the current location of the tram. The SL18 is bi-directional, so there is no need to use a balloon loop to turn around. Therefore, there are two driver cabs, one at each end of the tram. They are also infitted with USB-charging slots. There are multiple ticket validators aboard the tram. There are twelve doors with six on each side. The doors create a beeping noise whenever they open and close. Unfortunately, this has led to complaints from people stating that the noise level is too high.

There are 56 seats in total, arranged in a transverse seating pattern. This is less than the previous SL95 trams, which had 88 seats. According to Jan Rustad, communications adviser of Sporveien, the reason for the reduced seating capacity is to make it more accessible for stroller and wheelchair users.

Sporveien has also developed a cloud-based platform that runs on Amazon Web Services, which communicates with the SL18 trams over 4G/5G. This platform is called LeadMind, and it is a cloud solution which monitors the condition of the technical segments of the tram. The technical department (who are stationed in the depots) have access to this system. The trams also have GPS that transmits its location to the digital platform two times per second.

== Operation ==
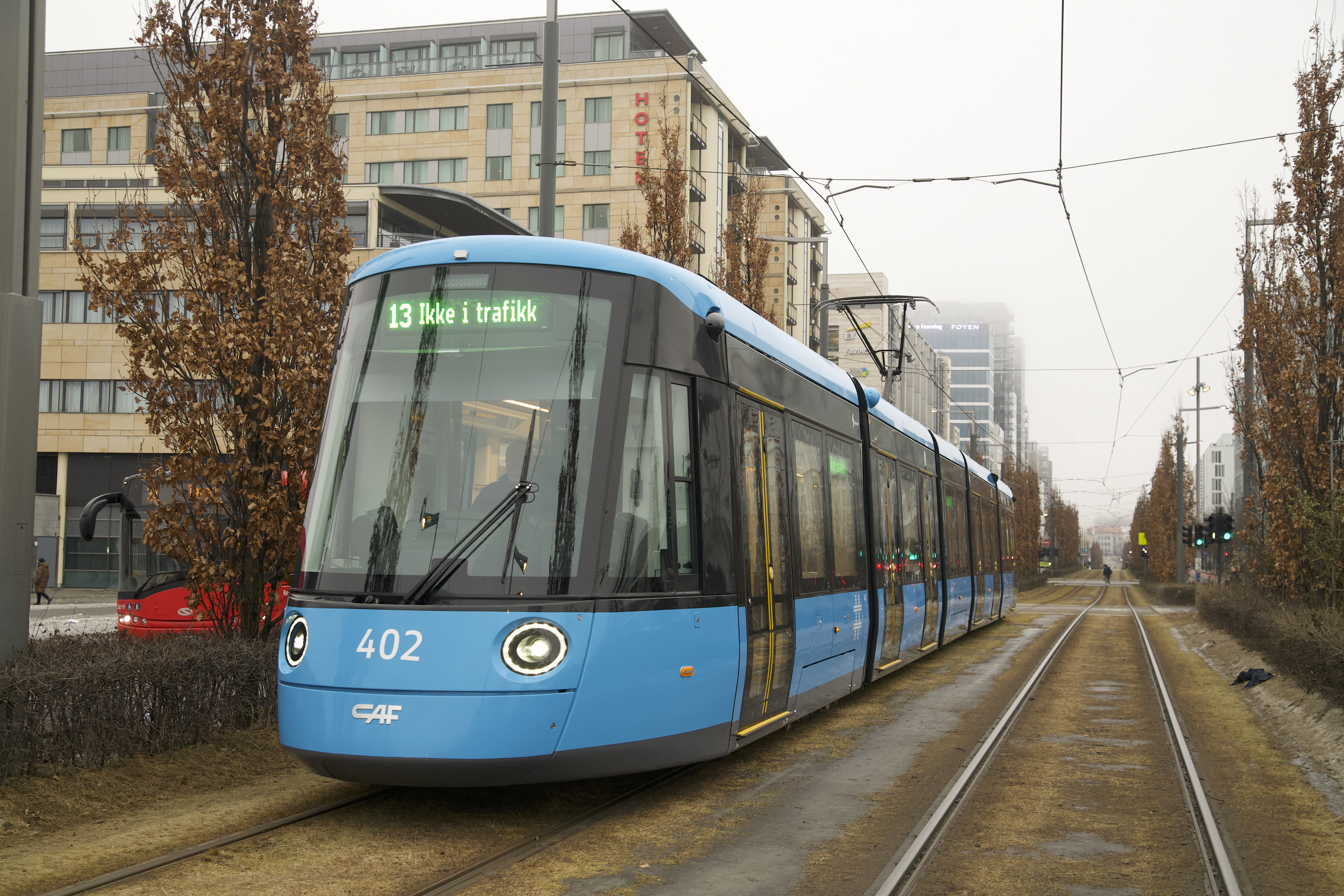
An SL18 tram at Bjørvika on a test run.

At the moment, SL18 trams are operating on routes 13, 17, 18 and 19 (as of 2025). However, they have not completely replaced the SL95 on those routes, but instead at the moment, supplement alongside them. Therefore, they currently serve the Ullevål Hageby Line, the Grünerløkka–Torshov Line and the Sinsen Line. During the trial period in early 2022, the SL18 ran on sections of Line 13 (such as the Skøyen Line, the Bjørvika Line and the Ekeberg Line.) There was also a short trial period on Line 12 and 19 in June 2022. A few have also been set up on line 19 between Ljabru and Majorstuen.

Line 17 and 18 need a minimum of 19 trams to operate during the day, in order to maintain a 10-minute frequency. After this has been achieved, there are plans to start phasing them in on Line 12 and 19. According to City Councilor Raymond Johansen, the trams should be serving the city of Oslo for at least 25 or more years. The first days of service were inconvenient for riders as the SL18 had Spanish announcements, due to delays with bringing out the announcements in the local language of Norway. That's despite that written announcements on LED displays are in Norwegian. Vocal announcements on all trains now (as of 2024) play in local Norwegian language.

== See also ==
- SL79
- SL95
- CAF Urbos
- Trams in Oslo
