= Trams in Oslo =

Tram system in Oslo, Norway

Oslo tramway network

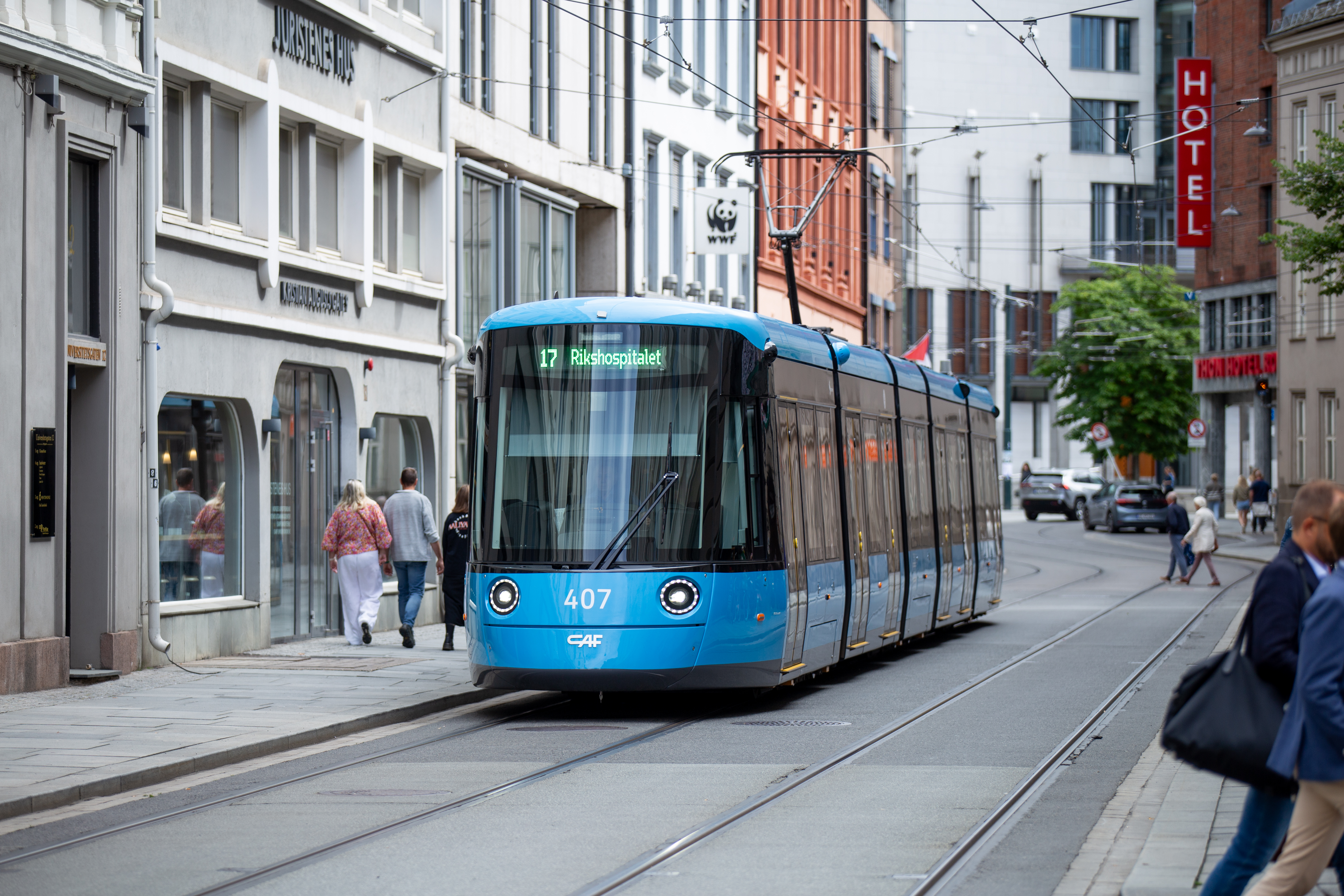

Overview
- Native name: Trikken i Oslo
- Owner: Sporveien
- Locale: Oslo, Norway
- Transit type: Tram
- Number of lines: 6
- Number of stations: 88
- Daily ridership: 132,000 (2012)

Operation
- Began operation: 1875; 151 years ago
- Operator: Sporveien Trikken
- Number of vehicles: 87 SL18

Technical
- Track gauge: 1,435 mm (4 ft 8 1/2 in) standard gauge
- Electrification: 750 V DC overhead catenary

The Oslo tram network (Norwegian: Trikken i Oslo, short from elektrikk, 'electric') is the tram system in Oslo, Norway. It consists of six lines with 99 stops and has a daily ridership of 132,000. It is operated by Sporveien Trikken AS, a subsidiary of the municipally owned Sporveien who maintain the track and 87 tram vehicles on contracts with the public transport authority Ruter. The system operates on standard gauge and uses 750 V DC overhead. Depot, workshops and headquarters are at Grefsen (at the terminus of lines 17 and 18). There is also a depot at Holtet (along lines 13 and 19) that is home to the technical company InfraPartner, which maintains the track for the tram and metro systems in Oslo, and a small office building for Oslo Sporveier.

== History ==
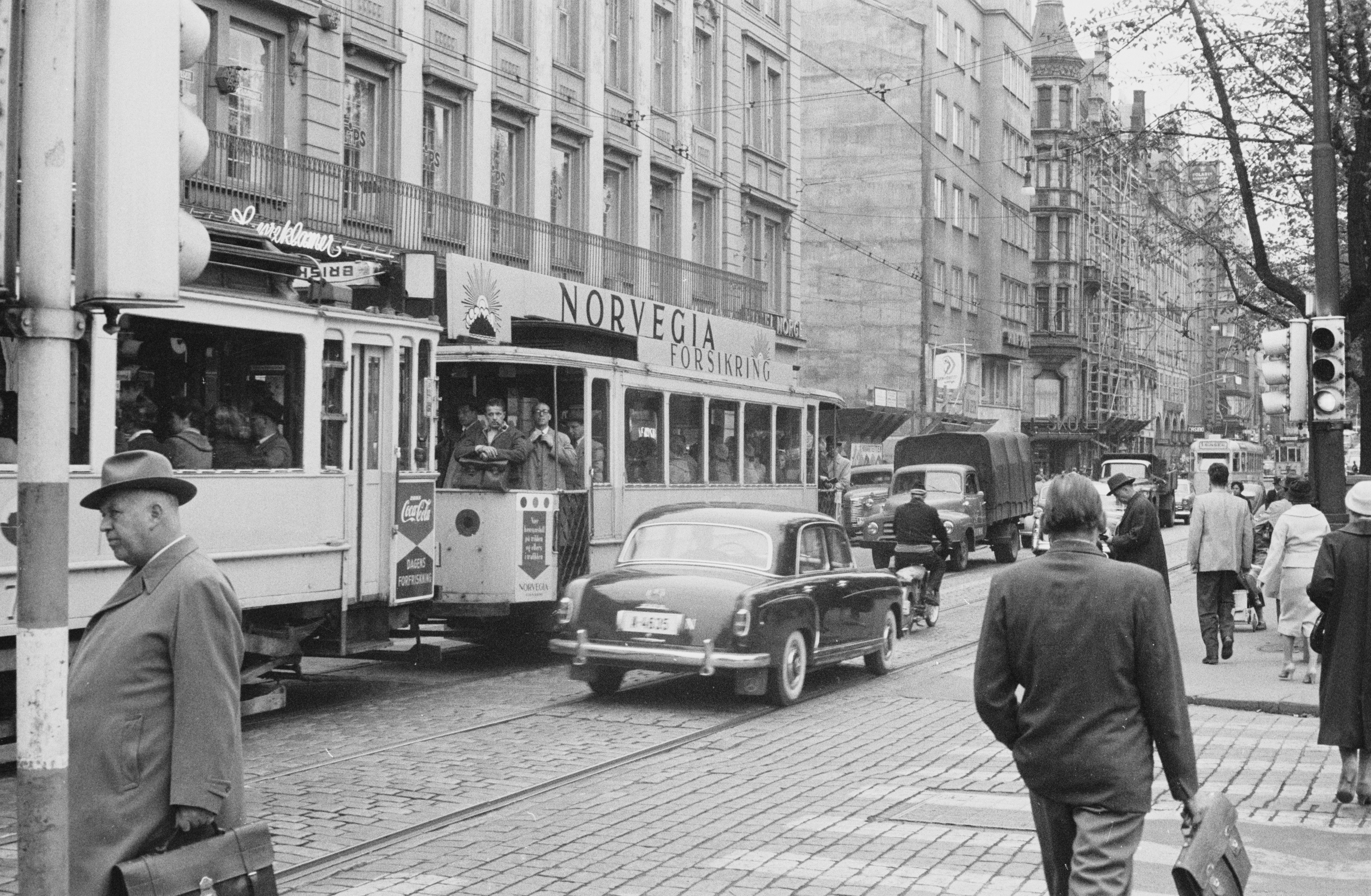
Trams on an Oslo street in 1959

The first tram in Oslo was opened in 1875 with a short line between Homansbyen west of the city centre, Oslo West Railway Station and a sideline to Grønland, east of the city centre. The first "trams" were in fact horse-drawn vehicles on flanged steel wheels. The first expansion of the line came in 1878 with a line to Grünerløkka just north-east to the city center.

Electric tram service was initiated in 1894 with a line over Briskeby to Majorstuen, a route south of the original Homansbyen line. Horsedrawn service was entirely replaced with electric service in 1900. For a long time, there were two tram companies operating in Oslo, "Grønntrikken" ("The Green Trams" with a green and yellow livery) and "Blåtrikken" ("The Blue Trams" with a blue livery). These companies were merged in 1924. During the 1910s, 1920s and 1930s, the network continued to expand, with the most notable addition being the construction of Ekebergbanen, a line up along the hill along the east side of the Oslo Fjord, south of the city. It was operated by a separate company. It was originally built to Sæter in 1917, the line was completed to Ljabru in 1941. The tram network reached its greatest extent in 1939 with the opening of the northeastern line to Sinsen.

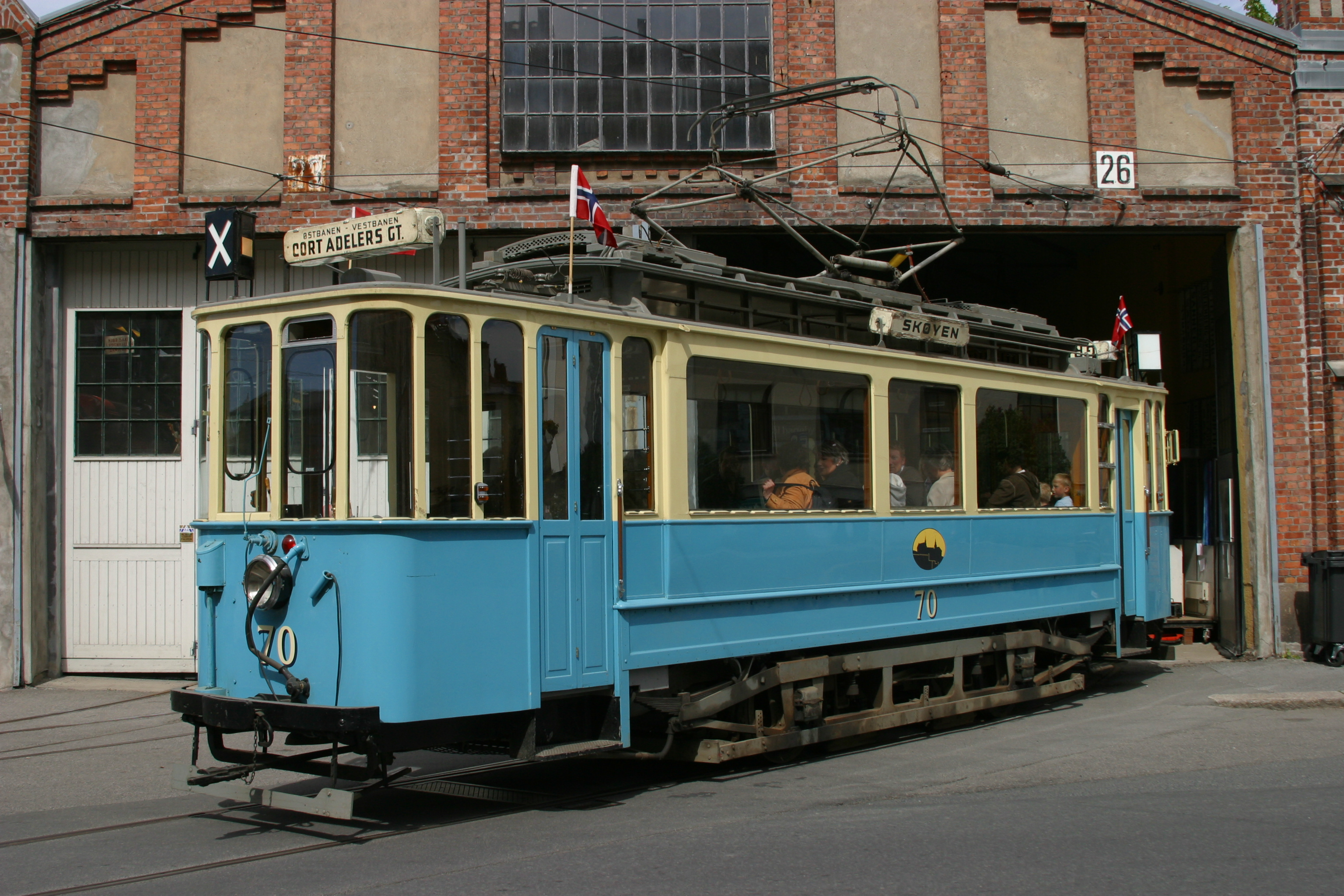
Historic electrical tram in Oslo

After World War II, the tram network gradually started being replaced with diesel buses, closures started in 1947, and in 1960, the city council decided to aim for a complete dismantlement of the entire tram system. A number of lines had been replaced with the T-bane subway system, and the versatility of buses was attractive to the local politicians. However, in 1977, the city council rescinded its decision to close the tram system. An order was made for a set of new articulated trams to supplement the aging fleet. The first of these trams, the SL79 was delivered in 1982.

The tram network was expanded slightly in the 1990s. A line over Aker Brygge was added in 1995, and in 1999 an extension of the northwestern Ullevål line was extended past the University of Oslo campus, to the new Rikshospitalet national hospital. A further renewal of the tram fleet by the addition of Italian double-articulated SL95 cars was also started. In 2002 the tram appeared to fall on hard times again. Oslo Sporveier was strapped for cash, and the board passed a decision to close down much of the tram system and replace it with buses. However, such a drastic change of operations forced a general assembly to meet, and most of the closures were cancelled. Finally, only the northernmost line to Kjelsås was closed in November 2002. In 2003, the tram system which had been part of Oslo Sporveier, was fissioned out to a separate company, Oslotrikken. However, Oslotrikken was instructed to drop the "Oslo" prefix in their name shortly after, making Trikken their official name. The line to Kjelsås was reopened in 2004, exactly two years after it was first closed.

The tram network has had a considerable expansion in passenger figures since 2003, but the number of tram departures has only increased by 22.7%. Lack of vehicles is a hindrance for further expansion of the tram service, and although orders for more vehicles are being planned, Ruter have said it will take years before the tram service can be expanded.

== Routes ==
As of 2021 there are six lines, all of which operate daily, usually on a schedule with a 10-minute headway, or 20-minute schedule during late evenings and weekends. Many stretches are operated by two or more lines. In central areas, served by more than one line, there is a maximum of 5-minute headway between trams, a concept named "Rullende fortau" (rolling sidewalk) by the tram company.

Two of the sections are light rail that run on separate tracks rather than in the road:

- The Ekeberg Line (Ekebergbanen) is the southernmost route, which runs up the hillside along the east coast of the Oslo Fjord, finally ending at Ljabru. It was one of the lines proposed axed in 2002, but spared at the general assembly. It is served by lines 13 and 19.
- The Lilleaker Line, is the most western route terminating at Lilleaker. The line used to extend outside the Oslo city limits to Bekkestua, in Bærum by sharing track with the Kolsås Line of the subway system between Jar and Bekkestua. Since the new SL18 trams are not certified to run on metro track, the line was curtailed to Lilleaker in 2024. The line is served by line 13.

The lines are color-coded, and the colors appear on the line map. Until a few years ago, destination signs had colours on destination signs (now they have digital destination displays.) Until early 2023, Line 11 and 13 shared colors, as well as lines 18 and 19. The tram maps distinguished between them by giving line 11 a lighter green than line 13, and by making the yellow of line 19 more orange. The route diagram changed in February 2023. Up until the 2005 restructuring of the tram system, there was also a line 10 (Jar-Skøyen-Aker Brygge-Jernbanetorget-Ullevål-Rikshospitalet), color-coded blue and a line 15 (Grefsen stasjon-Trondheimsveien-Nationaltheateret-Majorstuen), color-coded red.

No.	2020 Routing
11	Majorstuen–Briskeby–Nationaltheateret–Grünerløkka-Torshov–Storo–Disen–Kjelsås
12	Majorstuen–Frogner–Aker brygge–Grünerløkka–Torshov–Storo–Disen–Kjelsås
13	Lilleaker–Skøyen–Nationaltheateret– Ekeberg–Holtet–Ljabru
17	Rikshospitalet–Ullevål–Bislett-Stortorvet–Carl Berners plass–Sinsen–Grefsen stasjon
18	Rikshospitalet–Ullevål–Bislett-Stortorvet–Grünerløkka-Torshov-Storo-Grefsen stasjon
19	Majorstuen–Homansbyen–Stortorvet–Ekeberg–Holtet–Ljabru

The standard service for each line is one tram every 10 minutes, except for the Lilleaker–Bekkestua section of line 13 which is served every 20 minutes, but most of this section is also served every 15 minutes by Line 3 of the Oslo Metro. Lines 11, 12 and 19 are run jointly. A line 11 tram arriving at Majorstuen continues as a line 19, and a line 12 tram continues as line 11 and a line 19 tram continues as line 12. The same applies to the lines 17 and 18 at their terminus Grefsen.

Since lines 11, 12 and 19 run over Majorstuen, where several turns are too sharp for the newer SL-95 trams, they are operated with the lighter SL-79 trams. Lines 17 and 18 run to Rikshospitalet, which need to be operated by the bidirectional SL-95 trams. Both tram types are operating on line 13 but SL79 turns at Lilleaker instead of Bekkestua, where there is no loop.

=== Line 11 ===
Line 11: Majorstuen – Homansbyen – Stortorvet — Kjelsås

Majorstuen • Bogstadveien • Rosenborg • Briskeby • Riddervolds plass • Inkognitogata • Nationaltheatret • Øvre Slottsgate • Dronningens gate • Jernbanetorget • Storgata • Nybrua • Schous plass • Olaf Ryes plass • Birkelunden • Biermanns gate • Torshov • Sandaker senter • Grefsenveien • Storo • Disen • Doktor Smiths vei • Glads vei • Grefsenplatået • Grefsen stadion • Kjelsåsalleen • Kjelsås

=== Line 12 ===
Line 12: Majorstuen – Frogner – Akerbrygge — Kjelsås

Majorstuen • Frogner stadion • Vigelandsparken • Frogner plass • Elisenberg • Lille Frogner allé • Niels Juels gate • Solli • Ruseløkka • Akerbrygge • Kontraskjæret • Øvre Slottsgate • Dronningens gate• Jernbanetorget • Storgata • Nybrua • Schous plass • Olaf Ryes plass • Birkelunden • Biermanns gate • Torshov • Sandaker senter • Grefsenveien • Storo• Disen • Doktor Smiths vei • Glads vei • Grefsenplatået • Grefsen stadion • Kjelsåsalleen • Kjelsås

=== Line 13 ===
Line 13: Lilleaker – Skøyen – Ekeberg — Ljabru

Lilleaker • Sollerud • Furulund • Ullern • Abbediengen • Hoff • Skøyen • Thune • Nobels gate • Skarpsno • Skillebekk • Solli • Nationaltheatret • Øvre Slottsgate • Dronningens gate • Bjørvika • Middelalderparken • Oslo Hospital • Ekebergparken • Jomfrubråten • Sportsplassen • Holtet • Sørli • Kastellet • Bråten • Sæter • Ljabru

=== Line 17 ===
Line 17: Rikshospitalet – Bislett – Sinsen — Grefsen stasjon

Rikshospitalet • Gaustadalleen • Forskningsparken • Universitetet Blindern • John Collets plass • Ullevål sykehus • Adamstuen • Stensgata • Bislett • Dalsbergstien • Welhavens gate • Frydenlund • Holbergs plass • Tullinøkka • Tinghuset • Stortorvet • Jernbanetorget • Storgata • Nybrua • Heimdalsgata • Lakkegata skole • Sofienberg • Carl Berners plass • Rosenhoff • Sinsenterrassen • Sinsenkrysset • Grefsen stasjon

=== Line 18 ===
Line 18: Rikshospitalet – Bislett – Grünerløkka — Grefsen stasjon

Rikshospitalet • Gaustadalleen • Forskningsparken • Universitetet Blindern • John Collets plass • Ullevål sykehus • Adamstuen • Stensgata • Bislett • Dalsbergstien • Welhavens gate • Frydenlund • Holbergs plass • Tullinøkka • Tinghuset • Stortorvet • Jernbanetorget • Storgata • Nybrua • Schous plass • Olaf Ryes plass • Birkelunden • Biermanns gate • Torshov • Sandaker senter • Grefsenveien • Storo • Grefsen stasjon

=== Line 19 ===
Line 19: Majorstuen – Briskeby – Ekeberg — Ljabru

Majorstuen • Bogstadveien • Homansbyen • Welhavens gate • Frydenlund • Holbergs plass • Tullinøkka • Tinghuset • Stortorvet • Jernbanetorget • Bjørvika • Middelalderparken • Oslo Hospital • Ekebergparken • Jomfrubråten • Sportsplassen • Holtet • Sørli • Kastellet • Bråten • Sæter • Ljabru

== Incidents and accidents ==
On 29 October 2024, an SL18 tram derailed and crashed into an Eplehuset store on Storgata. Four people, including the tram driver, were reported to have been injured. Amid an ongoing investigation, the driver was charged with breaching Section 3 of the Road Traffic Act (Norwegian: Vegtrafikkloven) in connection with the accident.

== Rolling stock ==
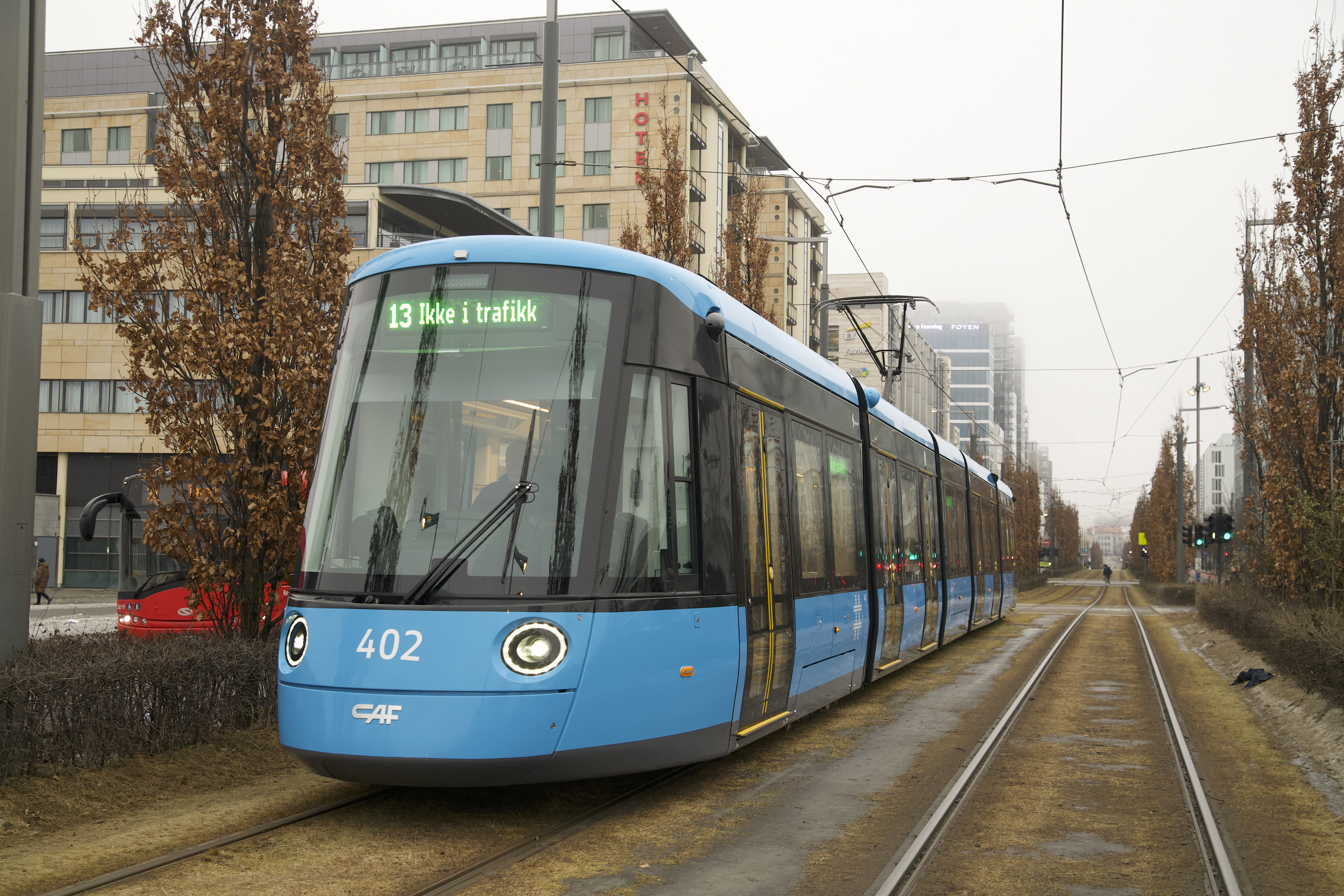
SL18

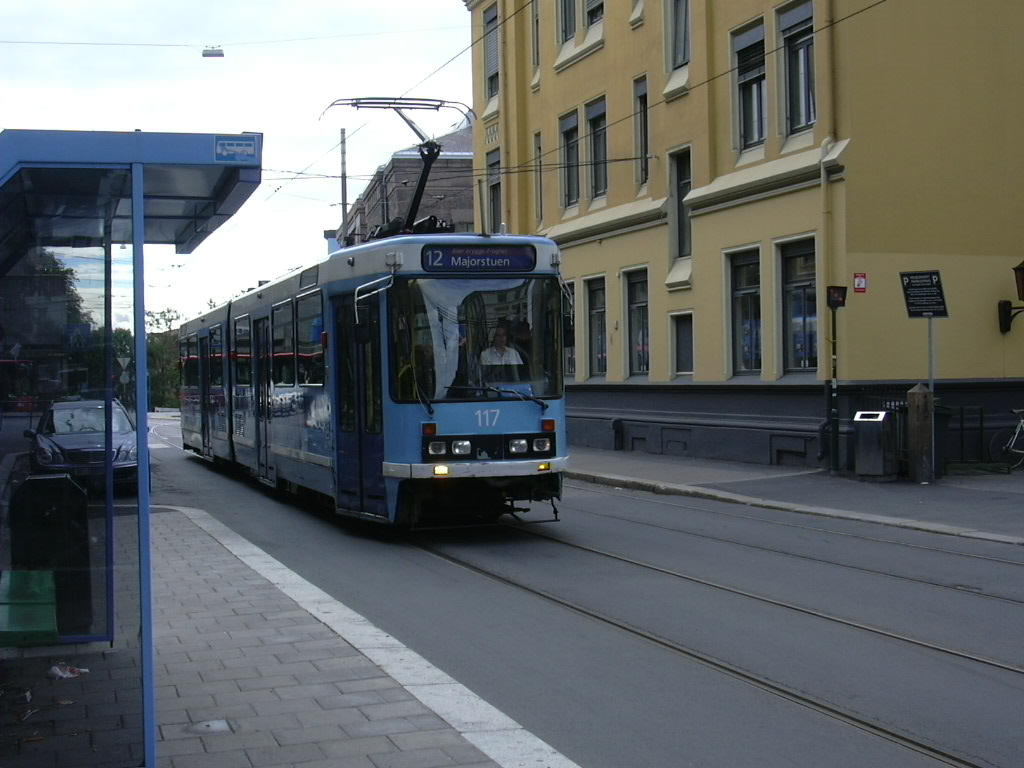
SL79

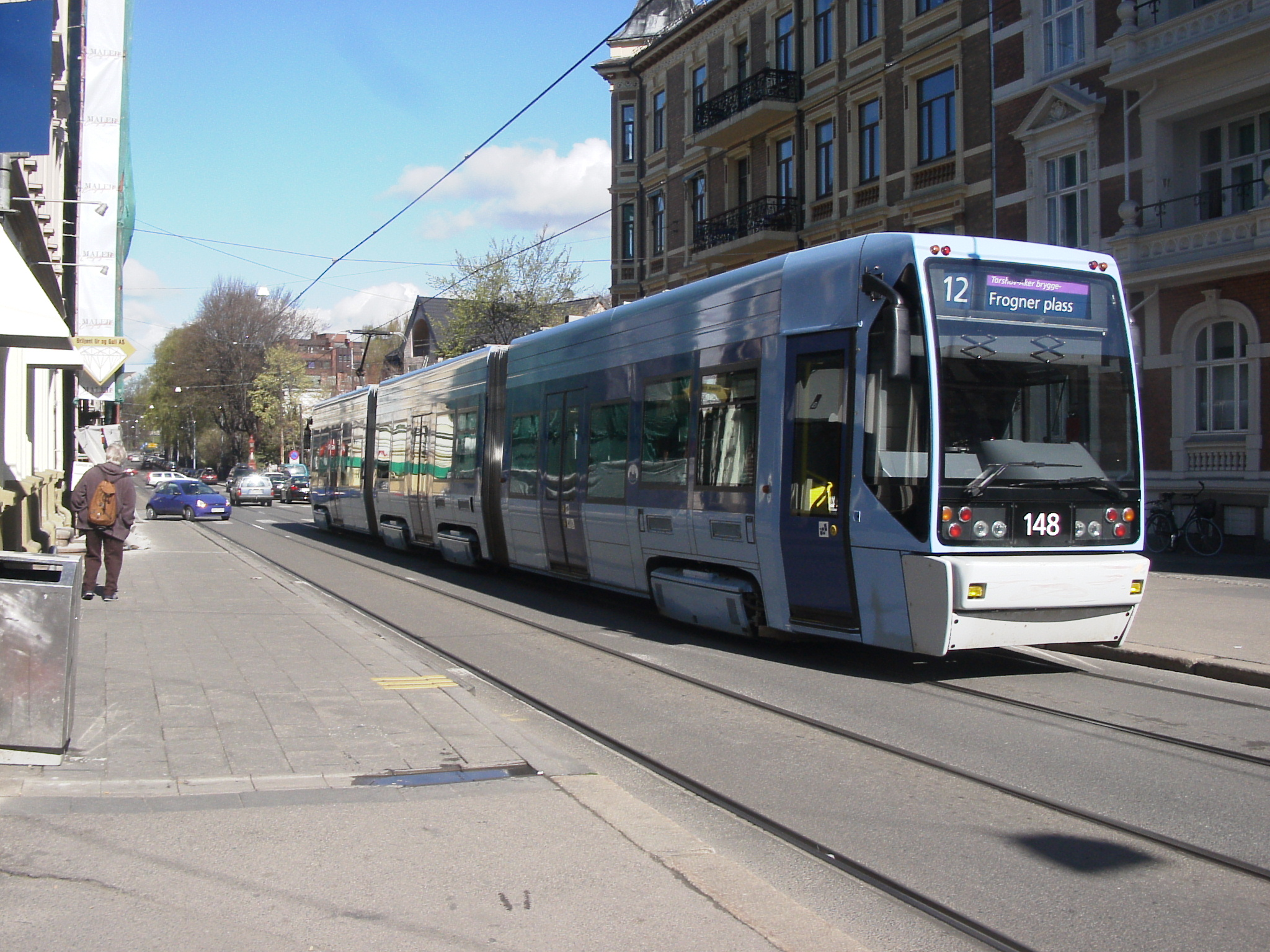
SL95

=== Current rolling stock ===
As of 2026, the fleet consists entirely of 87 SL18 trams, numbered 401-487.

The SL18 is a six-axle tram of the CAF Urbos 100 family. In 2018, Sporveien and Oslo Vognselskap collaboratively ordered 87 SL18 trams, with an option for a further 60 trams. The first two units were expected for summer 2020, although the COVID-19 pandemic delayed delivery to October 2020. They were tested in winter conditions in 2020 before the serial production began. Trial service with passengers commenced in 31 January 2022, which lasted over 5 months. The SL18 are bi-directional, five-segmented, 100% low-floor trams that will be much lighter and quieter than the SL95.

There are also some old trams which are brought out on special occasions. During the summer, tram no. 70 together with trailer no. 647 operates scheduled trips on Sundays. It was built by Falkenried in Hamburg, Germany in 1913 for Grønntrikken. It remained in regular passenger service until 1968 and continued to serve as a maintenance vehicle. For the tram's 100 year jubilee, the no. 70 tram was restored in 1994. Trailer no. 647, complete with the classical open platforms, is a replica of an old trailer, built from parts from tram no. 71.

=== Former rolling stock ===
- The 50 4-axle Høka motor cars (designated SM53 and numbered 204-253) entered service in 1952–58. These were not articulated trams, but usually pulled a matching trailer (designated ST55 and numbered 551-580) in order to increase capacity. In the mid-1980s eleven of these motor cars were rebuilt and modernised. These trams were given the designation SM83 and numbered 261–271. All these trams were retired in 2000 when Oslo Sporveier increased the voltage of the network from 600 V to 750 V.
- In 1954, with 30 Høka cars in service, one started manufacturing a type of hybrid cars, with a body similar to the Høka, though a bit smaller, built upon the undercarriage of existing, 2-axle, older cars. This type of car was called "kylling" ("chicken") because it was smaller than the new 4-axle cars built at HØNEfoss ("høne" = "hen"). The kylling cars were in service from 1954 until 1982. Matching trailers were also manufactured on the same principle, but these were mainly pulled by the Høka cars, as they proved too heavy to pull for the kylling cars.
- In the early 1990s, the line over Storo was cut off from its turning circle terminus due to construction work. To get around this problem, a number of old trams were purchased from Gothenburg at the price of 1 krone each. These trams, which had been built between 1958 and 1962, and designated M25 in Gothenburg, were coupled back-to-back so that a driver's cabin was available at either end of the train. They were designated SM91 in Oslo. The condition of the SM91 was somewhat better than the aging Høka cars, so they replaced them. The SM91 was never popular with passengers, they were as noisy as the Høka, and the rear doors, which would only allow people out of the tram, had to be pushed open manually by passengers from the inside. After a fatal accident involving the doors of this tram type in January 2001, the trams were no longer run coupled together. They were finally retired in November 2002.
- The SL79 were 40 single-articulated and uni-directional trams, numbered 101–140. They were delivered in two batches, the first batch, with 25 trams, started arriving in 1982, the second batch of 15 trams arrived in 1989. The two batches were fairly similar, but with different interiors, and the rear door of the second batch was double. The first ten trams were produced by Duewag of Germany, the rest were produced by ABB at Strømmen, east of Oslo. The trams are 22.18 metres long, 2.50 metres wide, 3,41 metres tall and weigh 32.8 tons. The tram could take 163 passengers, 71 of which were seated. The last SL79 was retired in September 2025.
- The SL95 were 32 double-articulated, bi-directional, partly low floor eight-axled trams, numbered 141-172 and delivered in 1998–2006. Being bi-directional, they could be used on services to Rikshospitalet which lacked a turning loop. However, the large turning radius and heavy weight of the tram makes it unsuitable for some of the lines to Majorstuen, which have poor tracks and sharp turns. The SL95s were delivered by the Italian company Ansaldo/Firema (then Ansaldobreda, now Hitachi Rail Italy). The SL95 were 33.12 metres long, 2.6 metres wide, 3.62 metres tall and weighed 64.98 tons. The tram had a capacity for 212 passengers, 88 of which were seated. The last SL95 tram was retired in April 2025.
