= SL79 =

Articulated tramcar class in Oslo, Norway

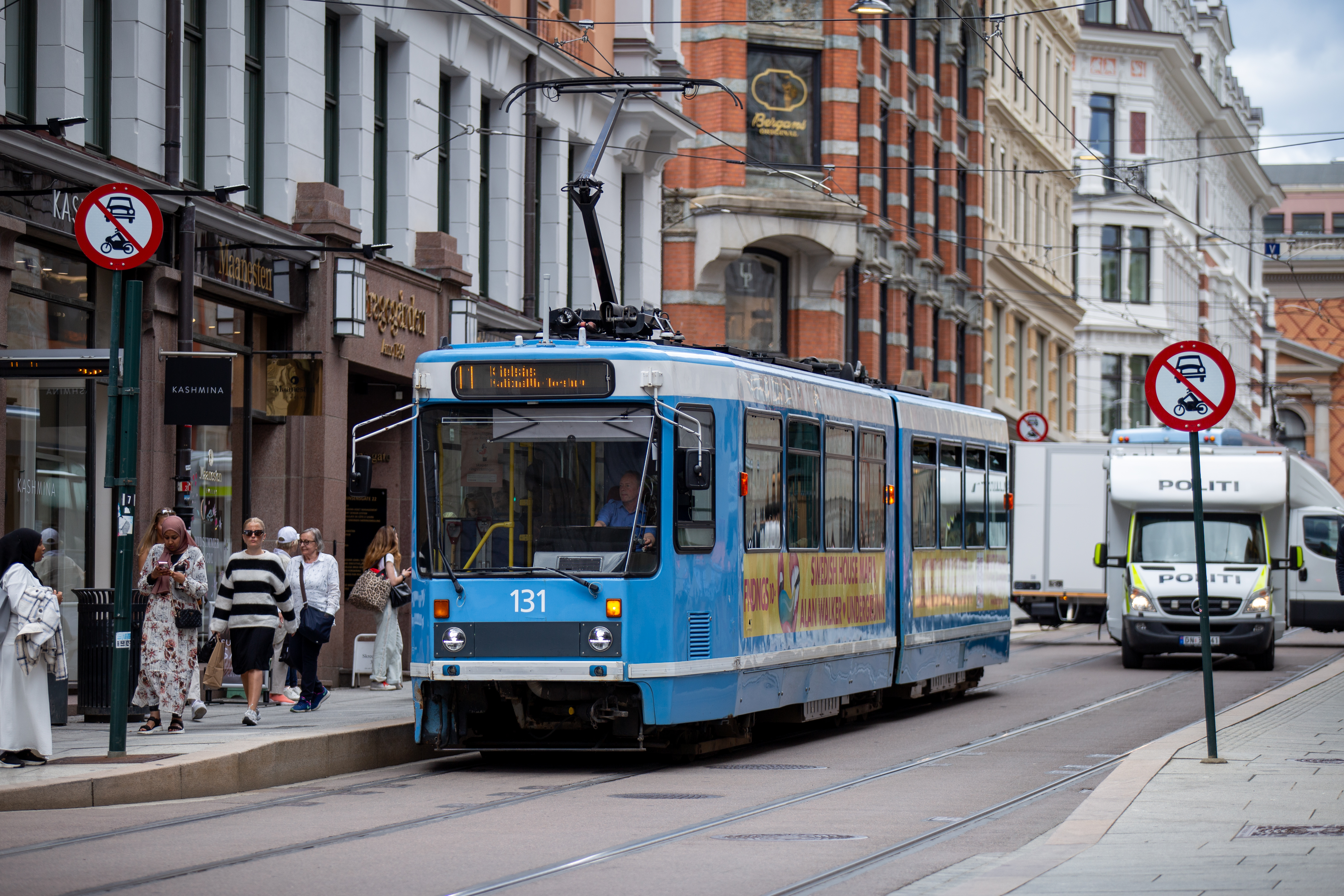
- In service: 1982–2025
- Manufacturers: Duewag (25); ABB (15)
- Built at: Duewag (10); Strømmen (30)
- Replaced: Gullfisk
- Constructed: 1982–1990
- Number built: 40
- Number in service: 13
- Number scrapped: 1
- Fleet numbers: 101–140
- Capacity: 137
- Operator: Sporveien Trikken
- Depots: Grefsen, Holtet
- Line served: 11, 12

Specifications
- Car body construction: Steel
- Car length: 22.4 m (73 ft 6 in)
- Width: 2.5 m (8 ft 2 in)
- Height: 3,411 mm (11 ft 2.3 in)
- Floor height: 880 mm (35 in)
- Entry: 3-step stairs
- Doors: 4
- Wheel diameter: 680 mm (27 in)
- Maximum speed: 80 km/h (50 mph)
- Weight: 32.8 t (32.3 long tons; 36.2 short tons)
- Traction system: Thyristor chopper control
- Traction motors: 2 × NEBB 4ELO 2054B 217 kW (291 hp)
- Power output: 434 kW (582 hp)
- Acceleration: 1.3 m/s^{2} (4.3 ft/s^{2})
- Deceleration: 1.3 m/s^{2} (4.3 ft/s^{2})
- Electric systems: 750 V DC overhead catenary
- Current collection: Pantograph
- UIC classification: B′(2)′B′
- Braking systems: Regenerative and disc brakes
- Track gauge: 1,435 mm (4 ft 8 1/2 in) standard gauge

SL79 is a class of 40 articulated trams operated by the Oslo Tramway of Norway. The trams were a variation of the Duewag trams that had been developed by the German manufacturer since the 1950s. The six-axle vehicles are unidirectional with four doors on the right side. The trams can seat 77 passengers three and four abreast, with an additional 91 people able to stand. Power output is 434 kilowatts (582 hp), provided by two motors on the two end bogies, that supplement a central unpowered Jacobs bogie located under the articulation. The trams are 23.0 metres (75.5 ft) long and 2.5 metres (8 ft 2 in) wide. They are capable of 80 kilometres per hour (50 mph) and have standard gauge.

They were built in two series, the first of 25 units delivered in 1982–84, and the second of 15 units delivered in 1989–90. The first 10 units were built by Duewag, while the last 30 were built in Norway by Strømmen. They were numbered 101 through to 140. The two series vary slightly in specifications. The trams were ordered in 1979 after the 1977 decision to not close the tramway, after the SM53 were finished delivered in 1958. The SL79 mainly serves on lines 11, 12 and 19. However, during rush hour, SL79 trams supplement SL95s on line 13. Except those with an advertising livery, the trams are painted a light blue.

The SL79 trams, along with the flawed SL95 trams are currently being replaced by SL18 trams between 2020 and 2024.

== History ==
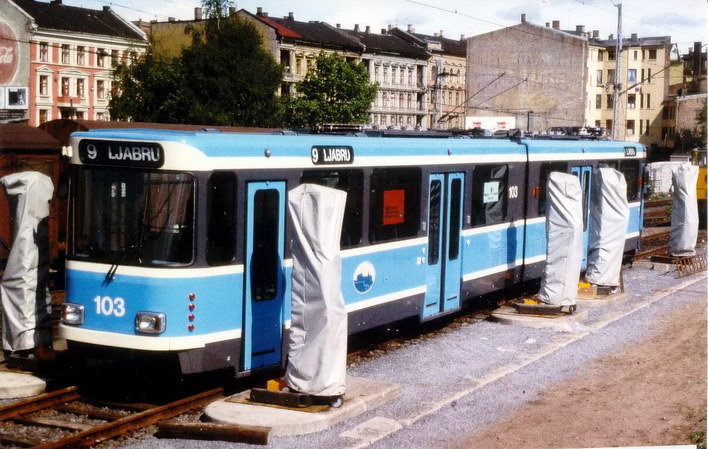
No. 103 upon delivery in 1982

In 1960, the Oslo City Council decided to gradually close the tramway. New trams had been delivered in 1958, and it was decided that lines would only be closed as trams were naturally retired. At the time Oslo Sporveier had 421 vehicles. By 1974, the company had 163 vehicles, of which 100 were powered trams, 43 were trailers and 20 were working trailers. Following the energy crisis in the 1970s, the political climate changed, and in 1977 the city council decided to not close the tramway anyway. Between 1978 and 1981, ten tram vehicles were bought from the Gothenburg Tramway.

In the 1950s, Duewag started to develop an articulated variation of its four-axle Großraumwagen, based on articulation technology used by trams in Rome. This design was delivered to many tramways, particularly in Germany. In 1977 and 1978, Oslo Sporveier tested a Duewag GT8S (3052) tram from Rheinbahn. In 1979, Oslo Sporveier ordered ten vehicles from Duewag, with planned delivery in 1982. In addition, fifteen units would be license-built by Strømmens Verksted, with delivery the following year. All the motors were built by the Norwegian company Norsk Elektrisk & Brown Boveri (NEBB). The trams built in Germany were transported to Oslo by railway. The first vehicle was delivered on 13 April 1982 and put into service on 2 July. The last German-built tram was put into service on 13 September. The German trams were numbered 101 through 110. Oslo was the third tramway in the world to take into use thyristor controlled motors on the main part of their fleet of trams, after the systems in Helsinki, Finland, and Hanover, Germany.

The first Norwegian-built tram was delivered on 16 February 1983 and put into service on 9 March. The last unit was put into service on 10 January 1984. The Strømmen trams were numbered 111 through 125. There were few problems in the start, although the pantographs had technical problems and there were occasional power failures in the overhead wires due to out-of-date rectifiers not being able to handle the increased power usage. Trams no. 101 through 113 were put into service on Line 9 on the Lilleaker Line and the Ekeberg Line, replacing the Class E. The remaining trams of the first series were put into service on Line 1, on the Sinsen Line and the Briskeby Line, as well as Line 7, on the Ullevål Hageby Line and the Sinsen Line. On Line 9, that included both the tramway's light rail sections, only SL79-trams were used, while lines 1 and 7 used a mix of SL79 and SM53-trams.

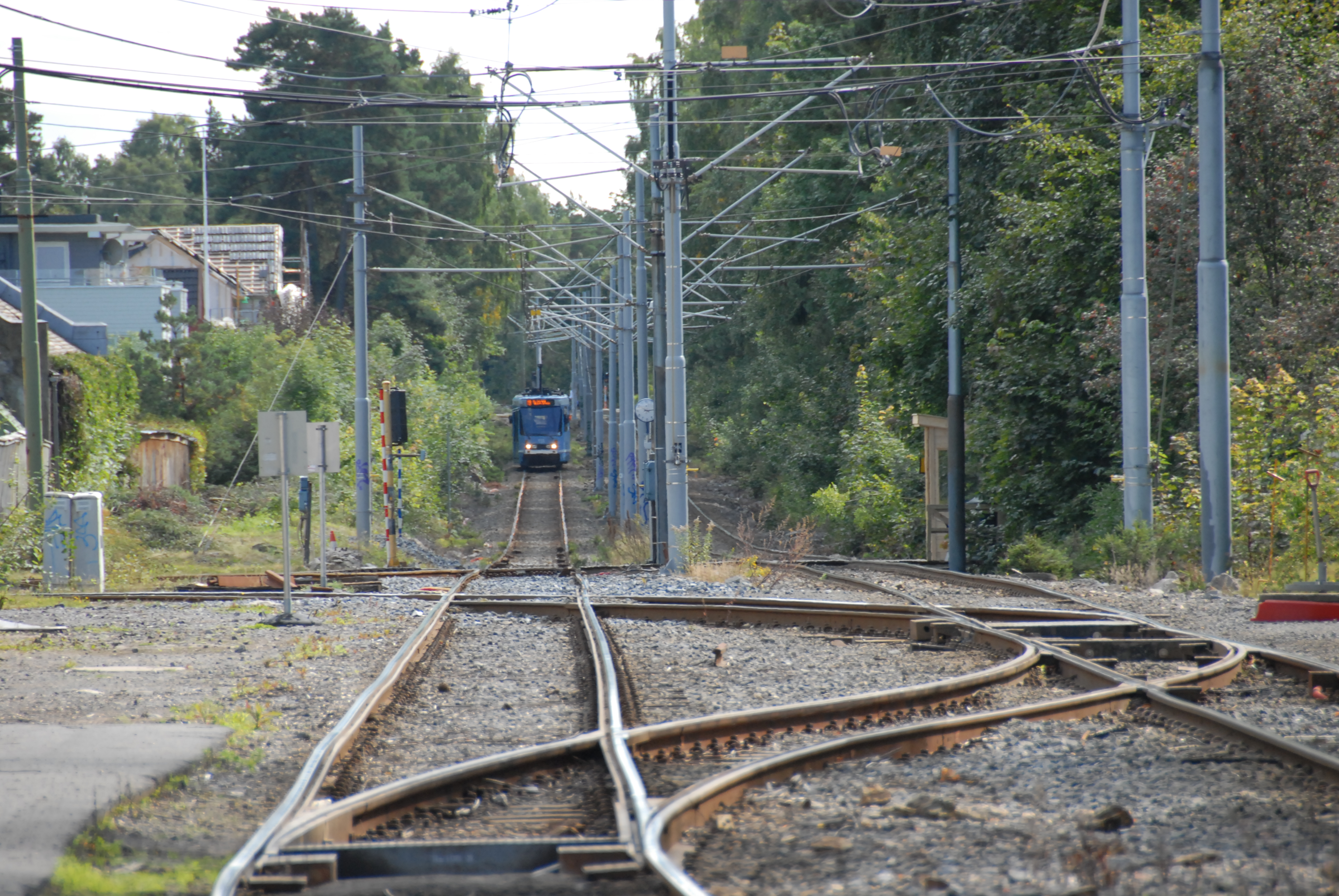
An SL79-tram near Holtet on the Ekeberg Line—one of two tramways remaining as suburban light rails.

Fifteen additional trams were built by Strømmen as series two. The first vehicle was delivered on 4 August 1989 and was taken into service on 11 October, while the last was put into service on 27 August 1990. These were numbered 126 through 140. From 7 September 1990 to 1 February 1991, tram 140 was used on the tramway in Chemnitz, Germany. Following this delivery, all lines of the tramway used SL79, although there were still many other trams needed to supplement the new trams. During the summer of 1995, tram no. 137 was used on the Djurgården Line of the heritage tramway in Stockholm, Sweden. Due to a labor dispute about privatizing the operation of the tramway and the Oslo Metro, the ownership of all trams and metro trains, including the SL95, were transferred to the municipally owned limited company Oslo Vognselskap in 2007.

Suggestions have been made to extend the trams with another center section, adding another axle and articulation, but these plans have been rejected by the company. Such a center section would be low-floor and give much easier access for strollers and wheelchairs, and allow the whole tram network to have step-free access. As of 2008, it was estimated that the SL79-series has about ten more years of service before it needs to be replaced.

In February 2017, the unit no. 108 reached its mileage of two million kilometres (1.2 million miles), which is equivalent to 50 times around the Earth, or "50,000 times" around the tram network, after its 34 years of service.

Sporveien and the Oslo City Council have decided in 2018 to purchase 87 tramcars from CAF designated SL18, which will replace both the SL79 and the SL95 units.

The first deliveries of SL18 were made in September 2020. The first SL79 unit was scrapped on 17 January 2023, with the remaining units expected to be replaced by 2024.

== Operations ==
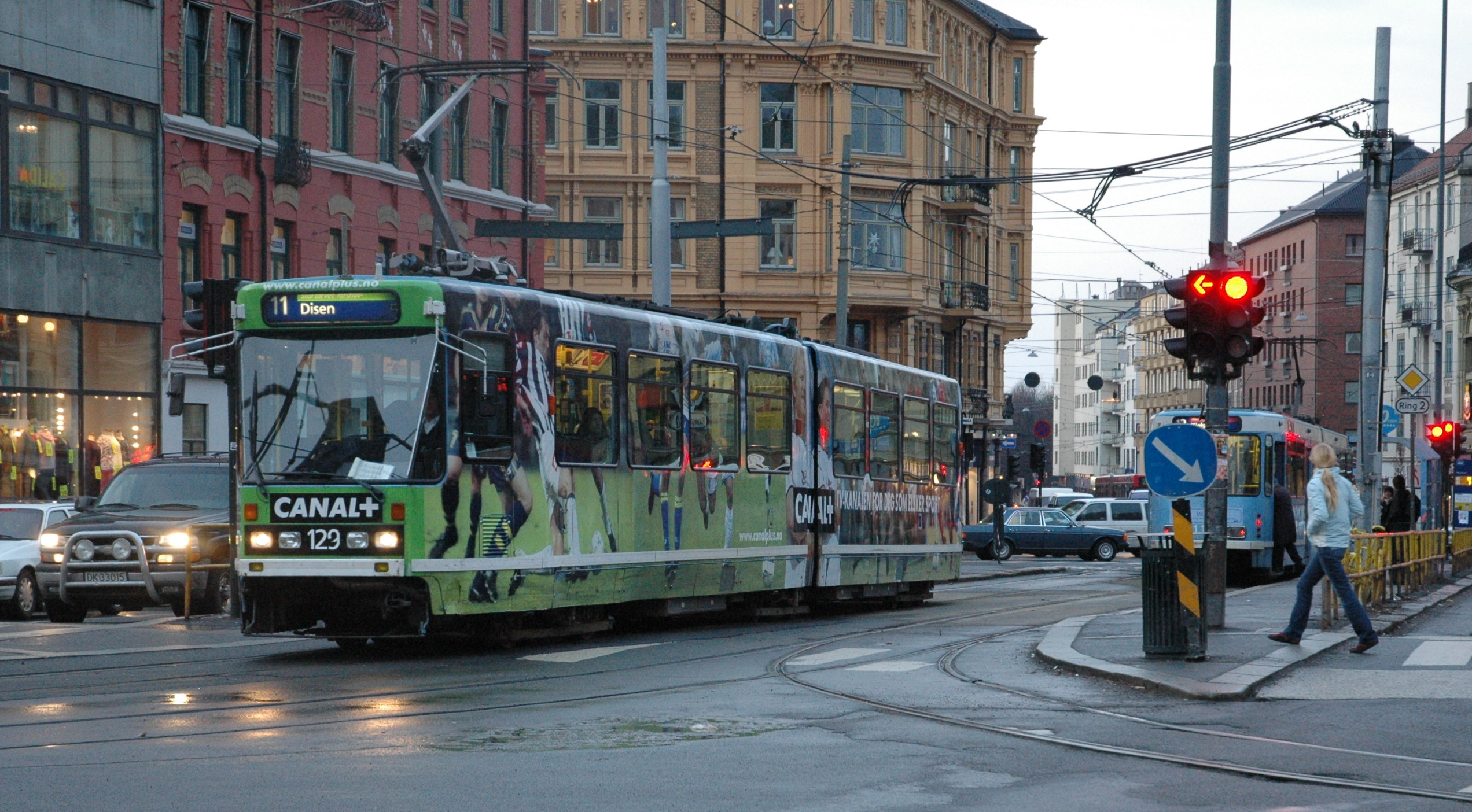
A series two SL79 at Majorstuen.

The SL79 make up 40 of the 72 trams in the system, supplementing the newer SL95. Following the delivery of the SL95 low-floor trams in 1999 and 2000, Oslo Sporveier has a pure articulated fleet. The newer series has a greater turning radius, heavier axle load and is two-directional. The radius and axle load of the SL95 makes it impossible for it to operate around Majorstuen, requiring lines 11, 12 and 19 to use SL79-units. With the 1999-extension of the Ullevål Hageby Line to Rikshospitalet, the tramway received its first terminus without a balloon loop, making it necessary for lines 17 and 18 to be served only by SL95 units. These also serve line 13, since it is a continuation of the service along the Sinsen Line from Majorstuen. The SL79 operated on the Briskeby, Ekeberg, Frogner, Gamleby, Grünerløkka–Torshov, Kjelsås and Vika Lines. Each service has a ten-minute headway, giving a five-minute interval on section that are served by two lines. The trams had their last day in service on September 27th 2025. The new SL18 trams are making up the entire operating fleet, although two SL79 are still operational.

== Specifications ==
The SL79 is an articulated tram built exclusively for the Oslo Tramway in two series with different specifications. The trams were designed by Duewag, who also built 10 units in Düsseldorf, Germany. Fifteen additional units plus the fifteen trams in the second series were built Strømmen outside Oslo. The motors for the first series was delivered by Duewag, while the second series was built by Asea Brown Boveri at their Norwegian subsidiary NEBB. The trams have a steel frame and are 22,180 millimeters (873 in) long and 2,500 millimeters (98 in) wide. Without payload the trams weigh 32,800 kilograms (72,300 lb).

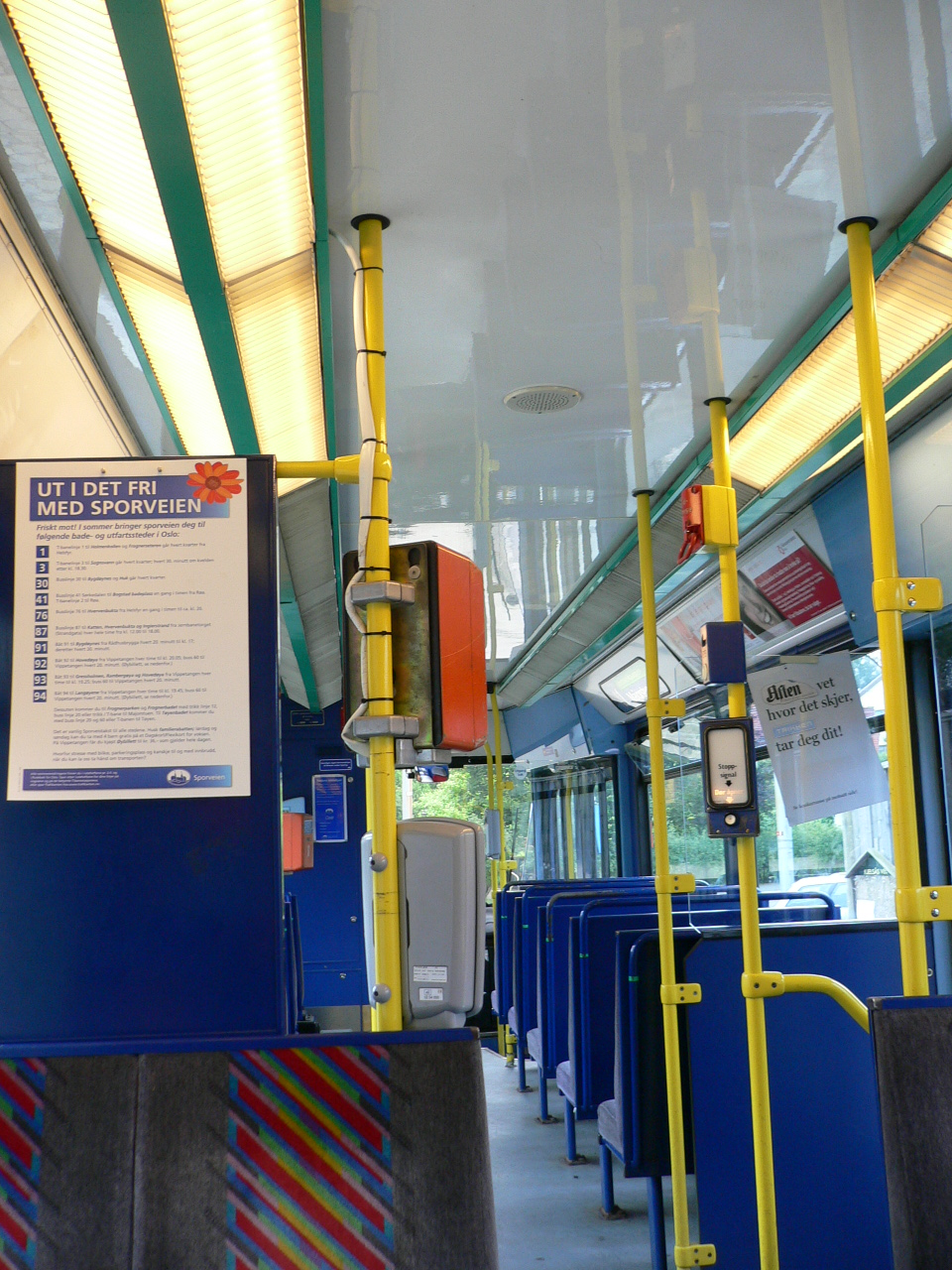
Interior view of a SL79/II.

Each tram has a total capacity of 162 riders, of which 71 can be seated. Seating is at three or four abreast. Series two was delivered with vandal-proof seats that proved uncomfortable and were replaced. The floor is 880 millimeters (35 in) above the tracks. The trams have four doors on the right side. The first series also have a single door on the left side, and the back right door was made single to match this. On series two, there are four double doors on the right side and none on the left side. SL79 was the first tram to be delivered with color-coded destination signs. By 2007, all the trams had had their rolling signs replaced by LED-type signs.

The trams have three standard gauge bogies, each with two axles, of which the front and back bogies are powered. The bogies have air suspension and hollow-axle gear boxes from Thyssen. The wheels have a diameter of 680 millimeters (27 in). The distance between the bogies is 7,700 millimeters (300 in). Each of the two NEBB 4ELO 2054 B thyristor monomotors have a power output of 217 kilowatts (291 hp), giving the vehicle a power output of 434 kilowatts (582 hp) at 750 V. Maximum speed is 80 km/h (50 mph). Acceleration in the range 0 to 40 km/h (0 to 25 mph) is limited to 1.3 meters per second squared (4.3 ft/s^{2}). Primary braking is achieved from the dynamic brake, that is capable of 1.3 m/s^{2} (4.3 ft/s^{2}) retardation with regeneration, allowing the braking power to be fed back to the overhead wires. In addition, there are disc brakes capable of 3.0 m/s^{2} (9.8 ft/s^{2}).

Except those with an advertising livery, the trams are painted a light blue. The first series was delivered with a deeper blue color than has been tradition with Oslo Sporveier trams, but all have since been repainted to match the standard livery. Prior to the delivery of the second series, a single tram was painted deep red to match the buses and the T1000 trains used on the Oslo Metro. Due to negative feedback from the riders, the historic color was kept.
