= Loenga–Alnabru Line =

Railway line in Oslo, Norway

Coordinates: 59.9056°N 10.7950°E

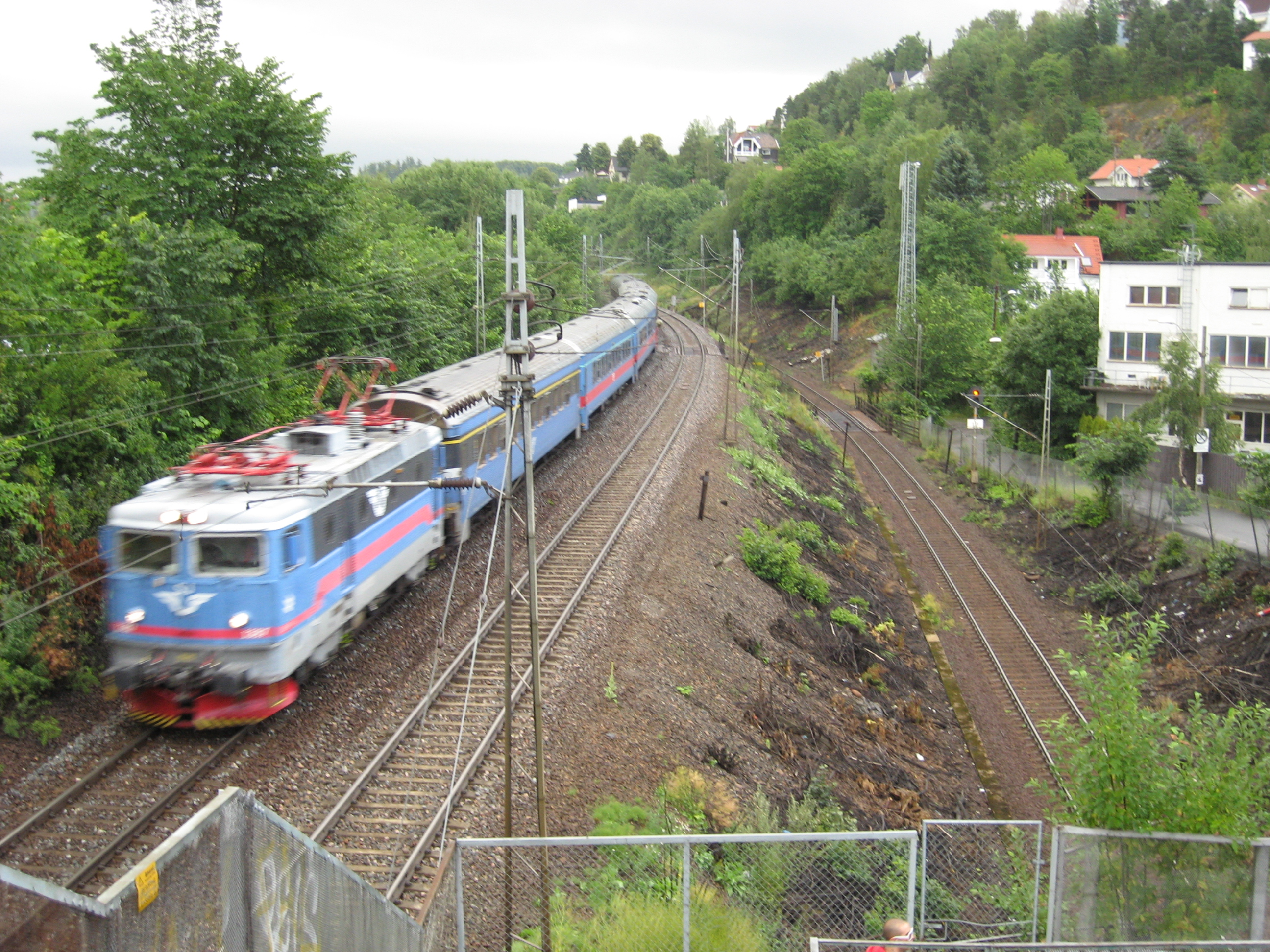
- The Loenga–Alnabru Line (right) and the Trunk Line (left)

Overview
- Owner: Norwegian National Rail Administration
- Termini: Loenga Station; Alnabru Freight Terminal

Service
- Type: Railway
- System: Norwegian railway
- Operator(s): CargoNet

History
- Opened: 1 May 1907

Technical
- Line length: 7.33 km (4.55 mi)
- Number of tracks: Single
- Character: Freight
- Track gauge: 1,435 mm (4 ft 8 1/2 in)
- Electrification: 15 kV 16.7 Hz AC

The Loenga–Alnabru Line (Norwegian: Loenga–Alnabrulinjen) is a 7.3-kilometer (4.5 mi) freight-only railway line in Oslo, Norway. It runs from the classification yard at Loenga(Norway) to Alnabru Freight Terminal, typically serving twenty trains per day. It allows trains to pass from the Østfold Line to Alnabru without passing via Oslo Central Station. It is also used by freight trains from the Sørlandet Line, which run via the Oslo Tunnel and cross over at Bryn Station. It is notorious for the steep hill Brynsbakken which it has to climb, giving it a gradient of 2.6 percent.

The line was opened from Bryn to Alnabru Station in 1904, with completion to Loenga on 1 May 1907. The line was electrified in 1928. A new classification yard opened at Alnabru in 1970. The line was the site of the Sjursøya Accident in 2010. In order to bypass Brynsbakken, the Norwegian National Rail Administration has proposed building a tunnel from further south on the Østfold Line, named the Bryn Diagonal.

== Route ==
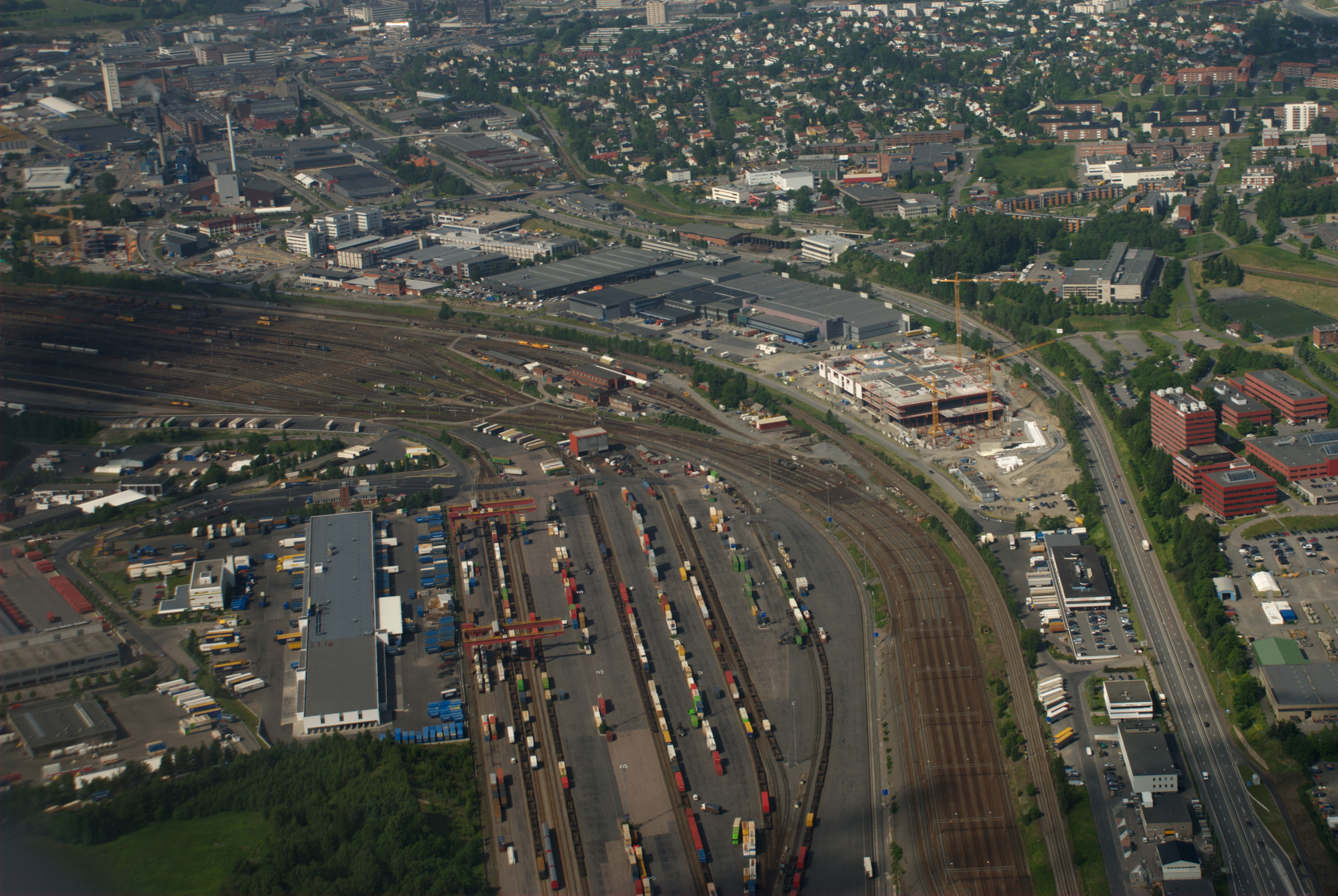
Alnabru Freight Terminal

The 7.33-kilometer (4.55 mi) Loenga–Alnabru Line connects the classification yard at Loenga with Alnabru Freight Terminal, both in Oslo. For most of the route the line follows the Alna River. The line has single track and standard gauge and is electrified at 15 kV 16.7 Hz AC. It has centralized traffic control, automatic train control and GSM-R train radio. The railway line is owned and maintained by the Norwegian National Rail Administration. The line is notorious for its steep climb, Brynsbakken, which has a gradient of 2.6 percent. Only 400 meters (1,300 ft) of the line is flat. Except for an underpass below the Trunk Line, the Loenga–Alnabru Line has a minimum curve radius of 610 meters (2,000 ft).

The line branches off from the Østfold Line at Loenga, at an elevation of 7 meters (23 ft). Loenga is a classification yard which serves Oslo Central Station. While the Østfold Line continues northeast to the station, the Loenga–Alnabru Line branches off in a northeasterly direction. It runs on overpasses over the Østfold Line and the branch to Lodalen. The line curves to run parallel with the Trunk Line. At Etterstad there is a switch which allows trains to pass to and from the Gardermoen Line, just before the latter enters the Romerike Tunnel. Afterwards the Loenga–Alnabru Line runs parallel to the Trunk Line, but at a lower elevation. At Bryn Station, 3.89 kilometers (2.42 mi) from Loenga, there is a switch allowing trains access from the Trunk Line. At 4.91 kilometers (3.05 mi) past Loenga the line passes into a 130-meter (430 ft) tunnel under the Trunk Line. The Loenga–Alnabru Line reaches Alnabru Freight Terminal after at 6.50 kilometers (4.04 mi). At this point the line has an elevation of 97 meters (318 ft). The line terminates as it reaches Alnabru S at 7.33 kilometers (4.55 mi).

== History ==
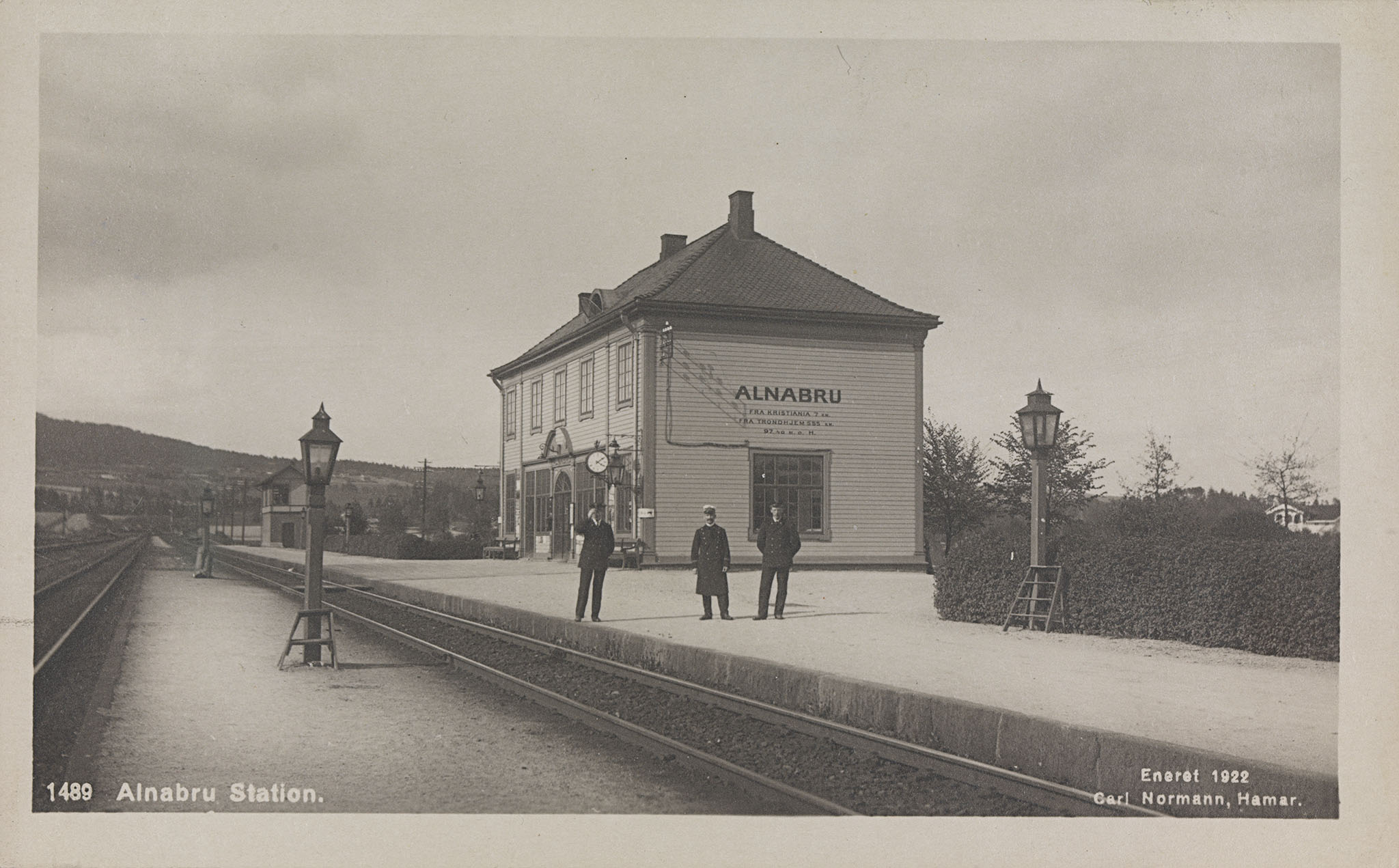
Alnabru Station in 1922

The Trunk Line was completed in 1854, followed by the Østfold Line in 1879. By the 1870s there was sufficient traffic on the Trunk Line that the Norwegian Trunk Railway was considering building double track along it. The economic decline throughout the 1880s put these plans on hold. Parliament decided in 1897 that the Gjøvik Line's freight trains would be handled at Loenga. This made it necessary for a separate freight track to be built through Loelvdalen. Surveys for a suitable place for cargo handling soon found that the steep gradient made it impossible to locate a cargo facility fore Alna.

Oslo East Station was soon too small and there was need for additional sites for classification and cargo handling. Loenga was chosen as the site in 1903, and the railway bought Oslo Ladegårds hage. Work on the yard started the same year and it was completed in 1909. Alnabru Station was established in 1900 along with the Alna Line. It was a diagonal connection with the Gjøvik Line. The station featured a large cargo handling facility.

Several routes were considered for the Loenga–Alnabru Line. The need to keep the gradient at bay meant that the tracks were placed at a lower elevation than the Trunk Line, with the two not reaching the same height until Bryn Station. At the same time the company needed to stay away from the Alna River. Meanwhile, the Gjøvik Line was built with a branch, the Alna Line, which connected to Alnabru. Just northeast of the Trunk Line was placed in a culvert under the Trunk Line so it would meet up with the Alna Line. The Loenga–Alnabru Line was completed between Bryn and Alnabru in May 1904. with this work being carried out at the same time as the doubling of the Trunk Line. The section from Loenga to Bryn opened on 1 May 1907.

Alnabru Station became an increasingly important cargo handling station for the capital area. The Norwegian State Railways bought the farm Nordre Alna in 1918, allowing for a further development of the station. and from Loenga to Bryn on 1 May 1907. The Loenga–Alnabru Line was electrified on 15 October 1928.

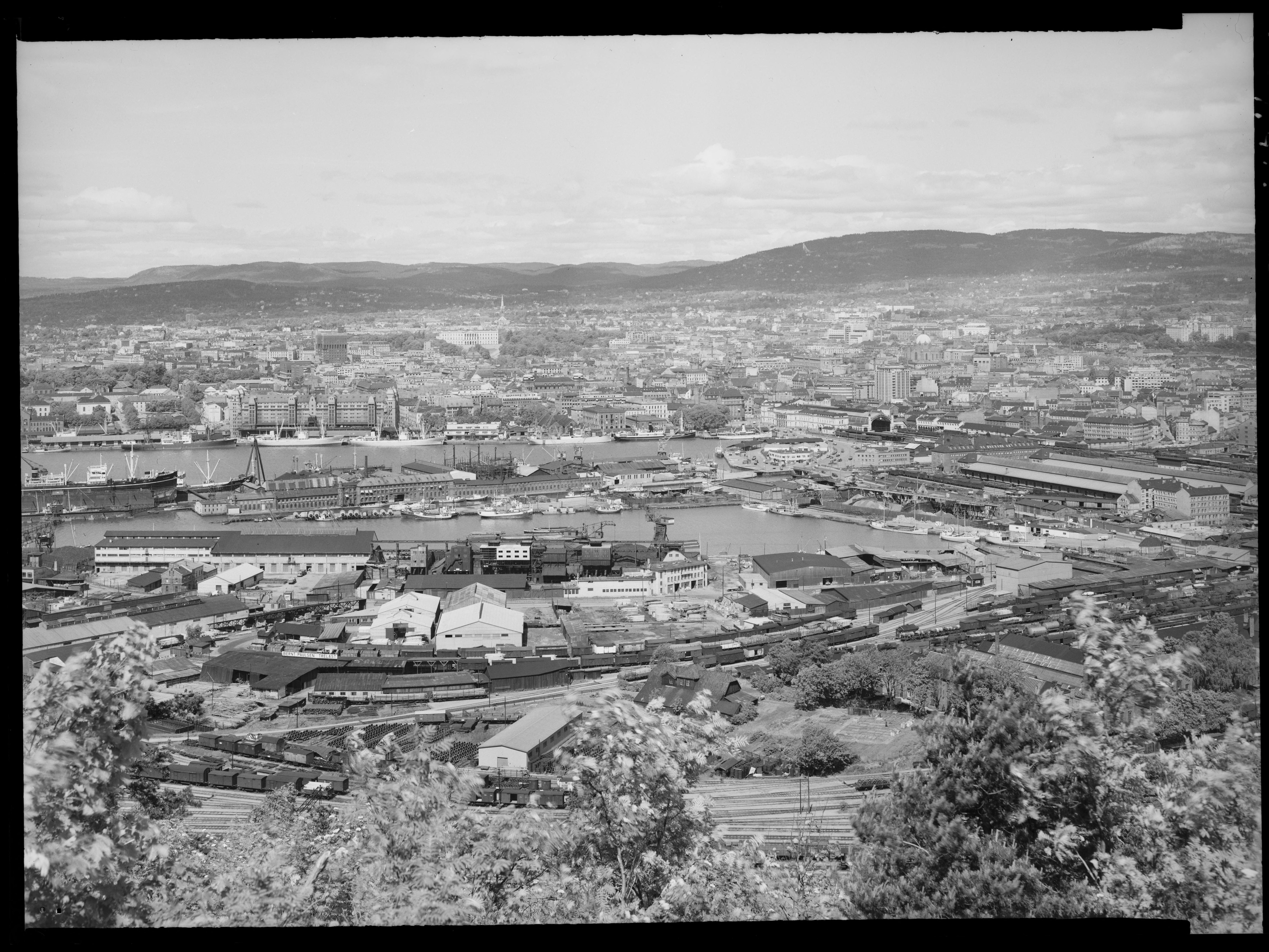
Loenga in 1952

The planning of the Oslo Tunnel and Oslo Central Station quickly made it obvious that cargo handling could not take place at the same site. Alnabru was thereby selected as the site for a new classification yard and container terminal. The old Alnabru Station was demolished and a new Alna Station was built on a new set of tracks on the Trunk Line. The Loenga–Alnabru Line and the Alna Line were connected to the western side of the new terminal, while the Trunk Line was not. The terminal opened in 1970, and the Loenga–Alnabru Line received centralized traffic control from 24 January 1972.

A series of road constructions in the Bryn area caused the Loenga–Alnabru Line to receive new structures. A 111-meter (364 ft) concrete bridge was completed in 1969 to carry European Road E6 over the tracks. An underpass below the entrance to the Vålerenga Tunnel was finished in 1987. An underpass below Kvernervegen was completed in 1999.

The Sjursøya train accident took place on 24 March 2010. A set of sixteen freight cars began rolling out of control during shunting at Alnabru. The train dispatcher central chose to lead the runaway train along the Loenga–Alnabru Line and out onto the port facilities at Sjursøya. By then the trains had reached an estimated speed exceeding 100 kilometers per hour (60 mph). Three people were killed and four were seriously injured.

== Service ==
The Loenga–Alnabru Line is only used by freight traffic heading to and from Alnabru Freight Terminal. These have three origins or destinations. Freight trains which originate on the Sørlandet Line pass through Oslo Central Station and continue along the Trunk Line until Bryn Station, where they switch onto the Loenga–Alnabru Line. Freight trains from the Østfold Line connect to the Loenga–Alnabru Line at Loenga. There are also freight trains which originate at Sjursøya. These currently only consist of about nine weekly services which haul jet fuel to Oslo Airport, Gardermoen. About 20 trains use the line each day. Travel time is about 12 minutes from Loenga to Alnabru, with an average speed of about 40 kilometers per hour (25 mph). Lacking any passing loops, the line has a theoretical capacity for two trains per direction per hour.

== Future ==
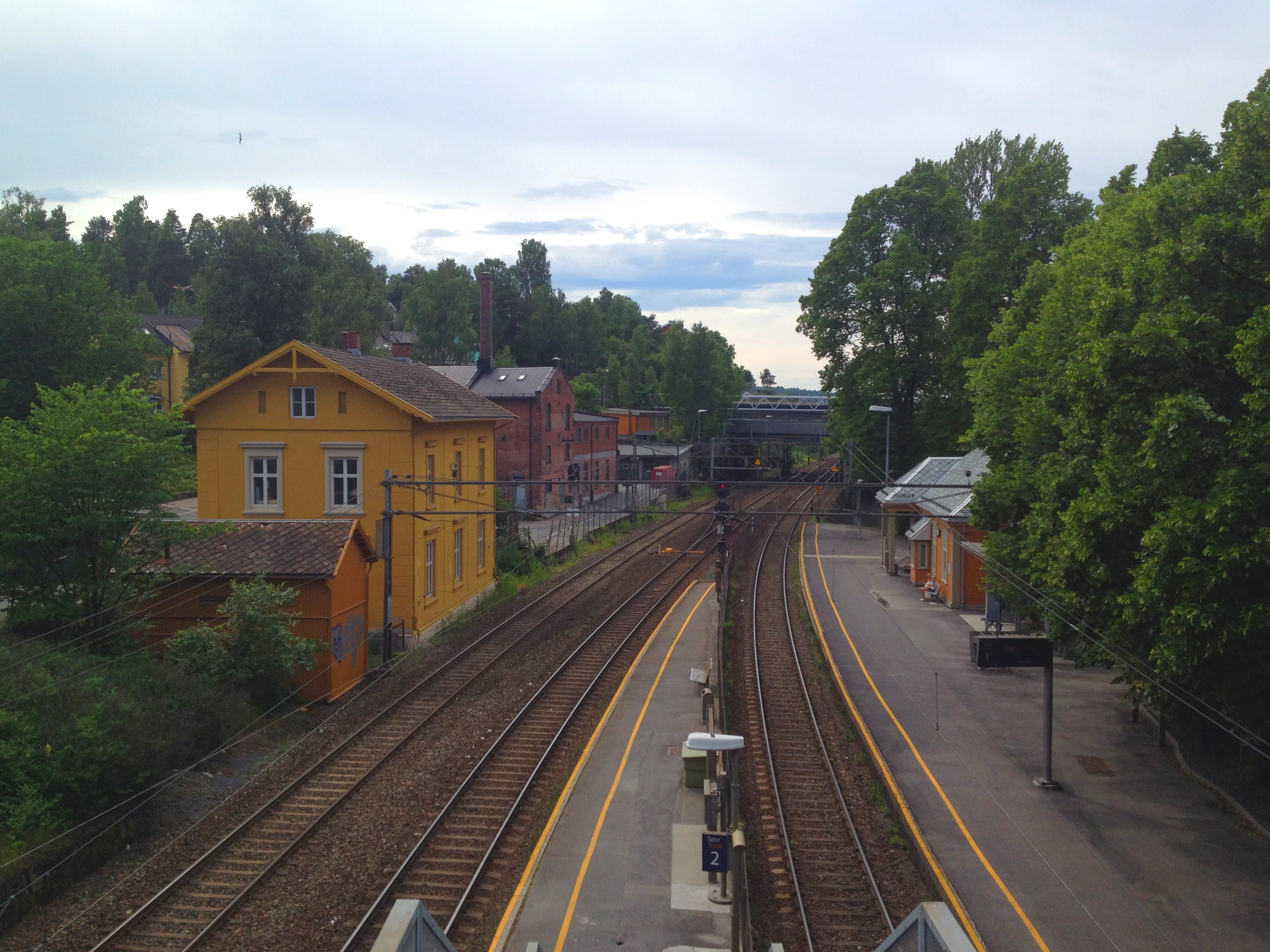
Bryn Station looking west. The Loenga–Alnabru Line is the tracks to the left.

Domestically rail transport has a market share of between 52 and 66 percent of intermodal transport from Oslo to Bergen, Trondheim and Stavanger. The corresponding market share on international routes is only 17 percent. It is an explicit political goal to increase rail transport's market share. The volume internationally is much higher than domestically, for instance 8.5 million tonnes from the south corridor compared to 1.6 million tonnes to Trondheim in 2011. The volume is expected to grow with 150 percent by 2040. The government is therefore prioritizing upgrading the corridor through Østfold to handle more freight. Development of the corridor would allow for direct intermodal train services to destinations in Central Europe.

The Port of Oslo is developing a new container terminal at Sjursøya. There is a significant amount of container traffic from the port to Alnabru, which is currently transported by road. If better infrastructure was established, this traffic could be transported by rail.

The steepness of the Brynsbakken is a major inconvenience for freight operators. They must either use an extra locomotive, which adds time and cost, or operate shorter trains, which reduces the operating efficiency. Brynsbakken has therefore been identified as a bottleneck in transport from the Sørlandet Line, Sweden and the Continent to Alnabru. Increased capacity southwards will allow for more freight trains towards Gothenburg, Denmark and the continent.

One alternative is to establish an extra locomotive at Loenga, which would require an upgrade of the track alignment at Loenga. Although this would cut some costs, it would still delay each train by about 25 minutes and requires additional tracks at both Loenga and Alnabru. Although freight trains from the Østfold Line pass through Loenga, those from the Sørlandet Line do not, causing additional delays.

The Bryn Diagonal (Norwegian: Bryndiagonalen) is a proposed new line which would connect to the Østfold Line and run to Bryn or Alnabru. By extending the line further south, it would have a longer route and thus less gradient. This would allow trains up to 1,500 tonnes to operate to Alnabru without assistance. Several specific proposals have been launched. One would involve a branching near Nordstrand Station. It could be built in such a way that trains also could arrive from the north, so that also trains from the Sørlandet Line could use it. Alternatives include branching off further south, for instance at Hauketo Station. All alternatives involve building the line in a tunnel.

During the planning of the Follo Line—a new high-speed connection between Oslo and Ski—there were proposals to connect it to the Bryn Diagonal. This was discarded by the National Rail Administration in 2014. The number of passenger trains on the new line would be so high and operate at such speeds that the Follo Line could only be operated by freight trains at night. The complexity, cost and maintenance of an intersection was regarded as not worthwhile for the limited amount of traffic.

== Bibliography ==
- Bjerke, Thor; Holom, Finn (2004). Banedata 2004 (in Norwegian). Hamar / Oslo: Norsk Jernbanemuseum / Norsk Jernbaneklubb. ISBN 82-90286-28-7.
- Faveo Prosjektledelse (2013). Utredning av ny Godsforbindelse til Alnabru (in Norwegian). Archived from the original (PDF) on 3 June 2016.
- Holøs, Bjørn (1990). Stasjoner i sentrum (in Norwegian). Oslo: Gyldendal Norsk Forlag. ISBN 82-05-19082-8.
- Norwegian Trunk Railway (1904). Norsk Hoved-Jernbane i femti aar (in Norwegian).
