= Sjursøya train accident =

2010 Rail accident in Norway

Details
- Date: 24 March 2010; 13:15
- Location: Sjursøya, Oslo
- Coordinates: 59°53′17″N 10°45′17″E
- Country: Norway
- Line: Loenga–Alnabru Line
- Operator: CargoNet
- Incident type: Collision with infrastructure
- Cause: Runaway

Statistics
- Trains: 1
- Passengers: 0
- Deaths: 3
- Injured: 4

The Sjursøya train accident was a railway accident that occurred on 24 March 2010 at around 13:15 local time, when a set of 16 freight cars began to roll uncontrollably during shunting on Alnabru, north in Oslo. The train dispatcher central chose to lead the runaway train in the direction of Sjursøya, along the Loenga–Alnabru Line, where it derailed and rolled through a Statoil building in the terminal area at Sjursøya, a peninsula which is part of the Oslo ports facilities. The line leading to the container and petroleum port at Sjursøya is a branch of Østfold Line, and is only used at low speeds. However, the empty carriages crashed into the harbour terminal at an estimated speed of more than 100 km/h (62 mph). At the most, the set of wagons had a speed of 90–140 km/h.

According to police reports, three people were killed in the accident while four people were injured. Of these four, three were severely hurt and the fourth person received minor injuries. According to TV 2 Nyhetskanalen, the condition of three of the injured persons was critical.

== The accident ==
The set of empty CargoNet wagons was parked at Alnabru Freight Terminal, pending use later in the day. The train sped downhill from Alnabru (about 90 m.a.s.l) for several miles, without a locomotive. The train hurtled out of control, smashing into a building and plunging into Oslofjord. The structure, where several people had been working, collapsed and part of the train fell into the fjord. According to the Norwegian Broadcasting Corporation, the Norwegian National Rail Administration tried to derail the train using a derail switch at Alnabru Freight Terminal, but without success. The set of carriages was always rolling on a freight track, and therefore there was no danger that it would roll towards Oslo Central Station. When the train was driving through Loenga yard, the centralized traffic control set a derailer so the runaway freight train could derail automatically. But also this device failed. Exactly how the train cars became detached and began to roll from Alnabru is still a mystery. However, later it was clarified by Norwegian Accident Investigation Board that the brakes on the cars did not work as they should, but it remains unclear whether human or technical error prevented the track brakes from functioning properly.

A similar accident occurred in 1981, when runaway freight cars belonging to Norwegian State Railways derailed near the bridge over Loenga, only 100 meters from Sjursøya. An incident with runaway CargoNet freight cars also occurred in the terminal area at Trondheim Central Station on 28 January 2010, but this accident caused only material damage.

== Accident report ==
On 3 May 2010, the preliminary accident report was submitted by the Norwegian Accident Investigation Board. It stated that were confusions between train managers at Alnabru which triggered the crash. It was a "misunderstanding between the shunter and another train manager" which caused the empty freight cars to roll. The train manager released the brakes on the carriages, in the belief that they were connected to a switcher, which they were not. When the runaway train was first discovered, it already had changed to track A5, which is one of the two tracks at Alnabru Freight Terminal that have no connection to a so-called emergency track. After that, there were no barriers in the proximity of Alnabru that could stop the runaway train. Human error is therefore seen as the main cause of the fatal train crash.

== Criminal charges ==
On 14 September 2010 the Norwegian Prosecuting Authority decided to fine the Norwegian National Rail Administration and CargoNet with 15 and 7 million Norwegian Krone respectively. Unlike the rail administration, CargoNet have not accepted the fine.

== See also ==
- List of rail accidents (2010–2019)
