= Alnabru station =

Railway station in Oslo, Norway

Alnabru
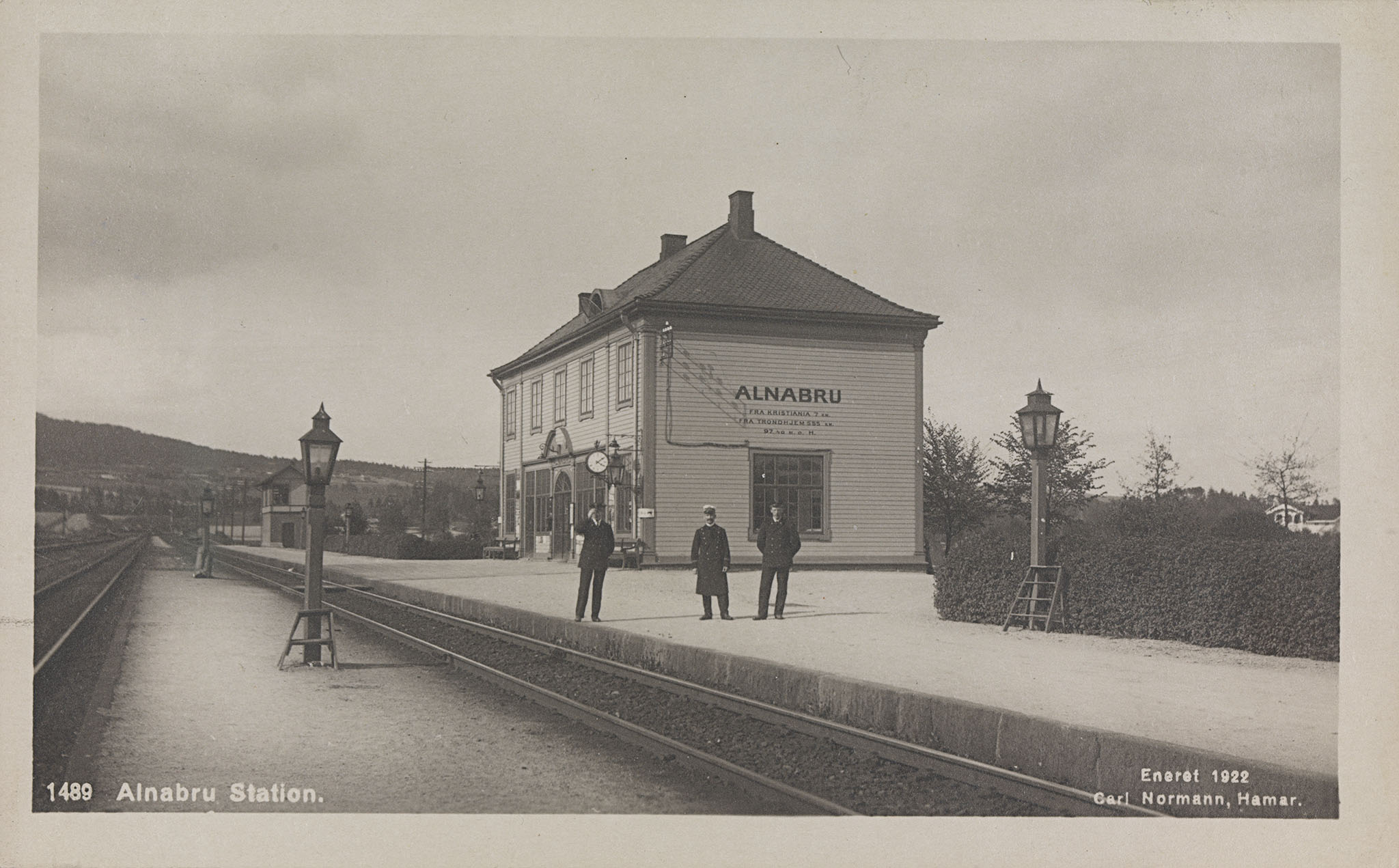
- Alnabru Station, c. 1922

General information
- Location: Oslo
- Coordinates: 59°55′45″N 10°50′11″E
- Elevation: 97.3 m (319 ft) AMSL
- Owner: Norwegian State Railways
- Lines: Trunk Line; Alna Line; Loenga–Alnabru Line
- Distance: 6.50 km (4.04 mi) from Oslo S

Construction
- Architect: Finn Ivar Andreas Knudsen

History
- Opened: 20 January 1902
- Closed: 14 June 1971
- Electrified: 1 January 1927
Location

Alnabru Station (Norwegian: Alnabru stasjon) was a railway station on the Trunk Line located in the Alnabru neighborhood of Oslo, Norway. Situated 6.50 kilometers (4.04 mi) from Oslo Central Station, it was built primarily as a cargo handling station, although it also served passengers. The station building was designed by Finn Ivar Andreas Knudsen.

The station opened on 20 January 1902 at the same time as the Trunk Line received double track. It was named Alna until 1 May. The Alna Line was built as a branch of the Gjøvik Line, allowing cargo trains to run to Alnabru. The Loenga–Alnabru Line opened in 1907, connecting the Østfold Line to Alnabru. The station remained in service until 14 June 1971. It was thereafter demolished to make room for Alnabru Freight Terminal. The Trunk Line was moved around the terminal and Alna Station opened on it to serve commuter trains.

== History ==
When the Trunk Line was completed in 1854 there was no station serving the Alnabru area. From the 1880s there was a growing industry in the area. The Norwegian Trunk Railway established a station named Alna close to the site of the later Alnabru Station on 24 March 1872. However, it was closed on 1 December 1873.

During the planning of the Gjøvik Line it became evident that there was not sufficient space at Christiania East Station (today Oslo Central Station) to handle all the cargo from the various lines which terminated there. Initially Bryn Station was considered as a cargo terminal, but it was soon assessed that the site lacked sufficient space to host a terminal. The Norwegian Trunk Railway bought a 2.6 hectares (6.4 acres) plot of land at Alna in October 1897, with the plans of building a classification yard and station there. In June 1899 it signed an agreement with the Ministry of Labour that the Trunk Line from Christiania to Lillestrøm would receive double track. There would also be built a separate freight line from the Østfold Line via Bryn to a site at Alna, what became the Loenga–Alnabru Line. There would also be built a branch from the Gjøvik Line to Alnabru, the Alna Line.

Alnabru Station was built as part of the double tracking. Traffic had increased significantly along the line as so the Norwegian Trunk Railway commissioned new station buildings most places. Alnabru was thus built in the same style, with Finn Ivar Andreas Knudsen as architect. The station opened on 20 January 1902 and originally took the name Alna. This was changed to Alnabru on 1 May. An incomplete interlocking system was operational from 1 November 1903. The freight track from Bryn was taken into use in May 1904, and the entire Loenga–Alnabru Line was opened on 1 May 1907.

The Norwegian State Railways bought the farm Nordre Alna in 1918, allowing for a further development of the station and cargo areas. The line past the station was electrified on 1 September 1927. The Loenga–Alnabru Line followed on 15 October 1928. A complete interlocking system became operational from 28 August 1938.

Alnabru was eventually determined to act as the new main cargo yard for Oslo. Alnabru Freight Terminal was taken into use in 1970. This forced the Trunk Line to be rerouted past the freight yard, resulting in a new 1.1-kilometer (0.68 mi) section of track being built on the north side. Alna Station was placed on this segment. The new station was taken into use for trains in the direction of Oslo from 7 June 1971. The other track was taken into use on 14 June. The same day Alnabru Station was closed and subsequently demolished. Alna Station was originally named Alnabru, but took the name Alna in February 1973.

== Facilities ==
Alnabru Station was situated 6.50 kilometers (4.04 mi) from Oslo East Station, at an elevation of 97 meters (318 ft) above mean sea level. The line past the station was double track and electrified. The wooden station building was designed by Finn Ivar Andreas Knudsen. In addition to the Trunk Line running through it, Alnabru was also the terminus of the Alna Line and the Loenga–Alnabru Line.

== Bibliography ==
- Bjerke, Thor; Holom, Finn (2004). Banedata 2004 (in Norwegian). Hamar / Oslo: Norwegian Railway Museum / Norwegian Railway Club. ISBN 82-90286-28-7.
- Norwegian Trunk Railway (1904). Norsk Hoved-Jernbane i femti aar (in Norwegian).

Preceding station		Following station
Grefsen	Alna Line	—
Loenga	Loenga–Alnabru Line	—
Bryn	Trunk Line	Nydalen
