= Sandaker senter tram stop =

Tram station in Oslo, Norway

Sandaker senter
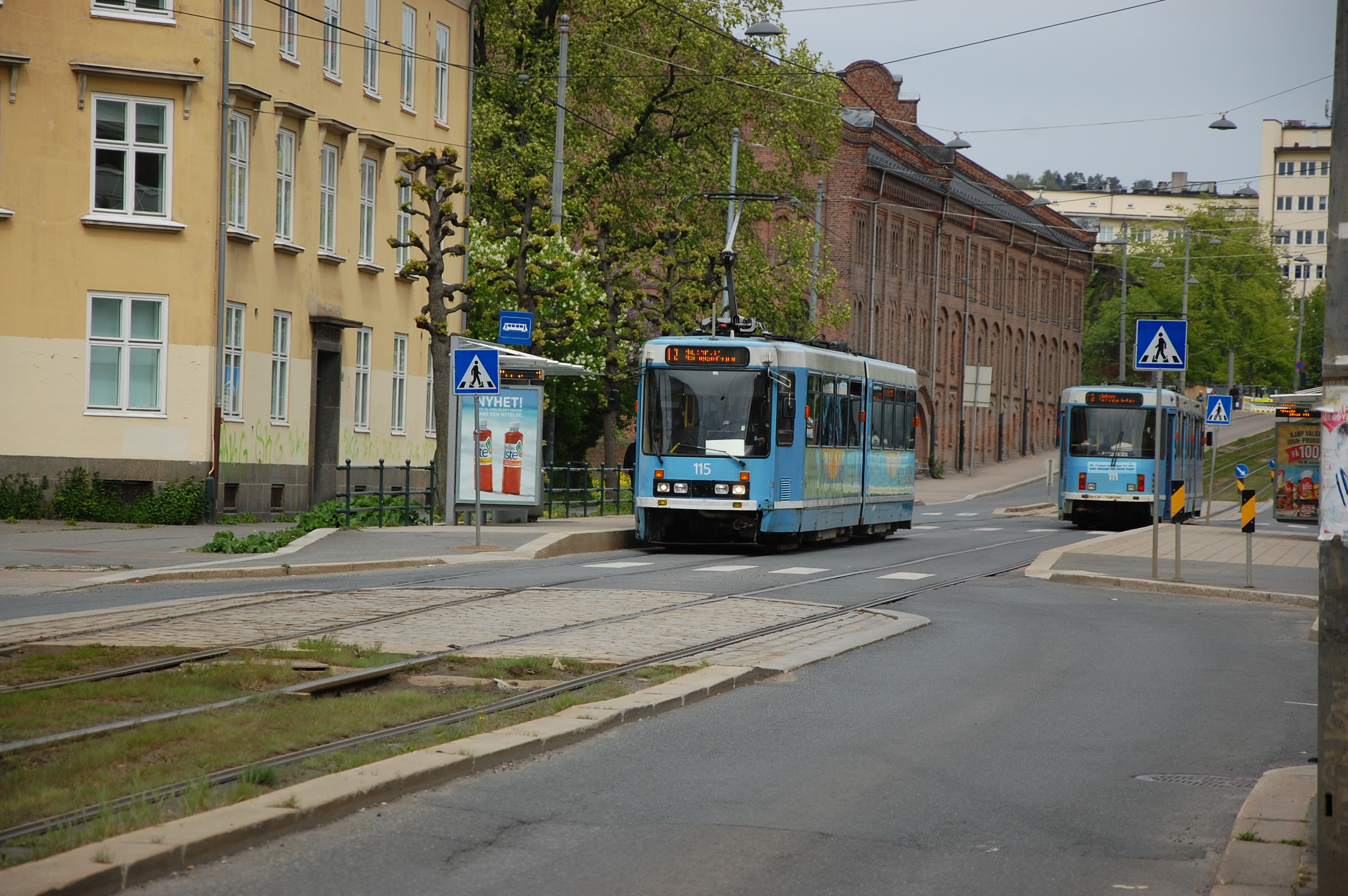
- SL79 trams at Sandaker senter tram stop in 2015.

General information
- Location: Sagene, Oslo; Norway
- Coordinates: 59°56′20″N 10°46′07″E
- System: Oslo tramway station in Sagene
- Operator: Sporveien Trikken
- Line: Grünerløkka–Torshov Line
- Tracks: Double

Other information
- Fare zone: Zone 1

History
- Opened: 1994
Services
| Preceding station | Trams in Oslo | Following station |
|---|---|---|
| Torshov towards Majorstuen | Line 11 | Grefsenveien towards Kjelsås |
| Torshov towards Majorstuen | Line 12 | Grefsenveien towards Kjelsås |
| Torshov towards Rikshospitalet | Line 18 | Grefsenveien towards Grefsen |
Route map
Location

Sandaker senter is a tram stop on the Grünerløkka–Torshov Line of the Oslo Tramway network. It is located in the borough of Sagene in Oslo, Norway. Sandaker senter is right next to the mall (the namesake of the tram stop itself; Sandaker senter.) It is also located near Sagene Fire Station and a mill called Bjølsen Valsemølle. This mill was part of the former Grain Tram system, in which special trams transported grain from the silos at Vippetangen. They stopped transporting grain in 1967, after running for 49 years.

== Facilities ==
The tram stop has two platforms located beside Sandakerveien. There are two waiting shelters, one on each platform and are infitted with dot-matrix displays. They also have route maps of the system and timetables. SL79, SL95 and SL18 trams currently serve the stop. The areas nearby also have grassed track.

== Service ==
The stop is served by Line 11, Line 12 and Line 18, each with a 10 to 15-minute headway. Torshov is the preceding tram stop and Grefsenveien is succeeding tram stop, when travelling north towards Storo. The stop is also served by two night bus services (11N and 12N) during the night period, but at a different platform located a few metres away.

== History ==
Trams operated by Kristiania Sporveisselskab begun running through the area where the stop is located, since 2 October 1901. In 1994, the Sandaker senter tram stop was established and replaced the former tram stops called Sandaker and Åsengata. In 2003, the tram stop was upgraded to prevent the passengers' danger. As a safety measure for passengers crossing Sandakerveien when disembarking, the platforms were laid right next to the tracks. As a result of this, private vehicles (like cars) had to wait for the tram to depart first. As part of the "Grefsenveien nedre" project of the Fremtidens Byreise programme, the infrastructure was upgraded and this also lead to closures of the tram stop.
