= Biermanns gate tram stop =

Tram station in Oslo, Norway

Biermanns gate
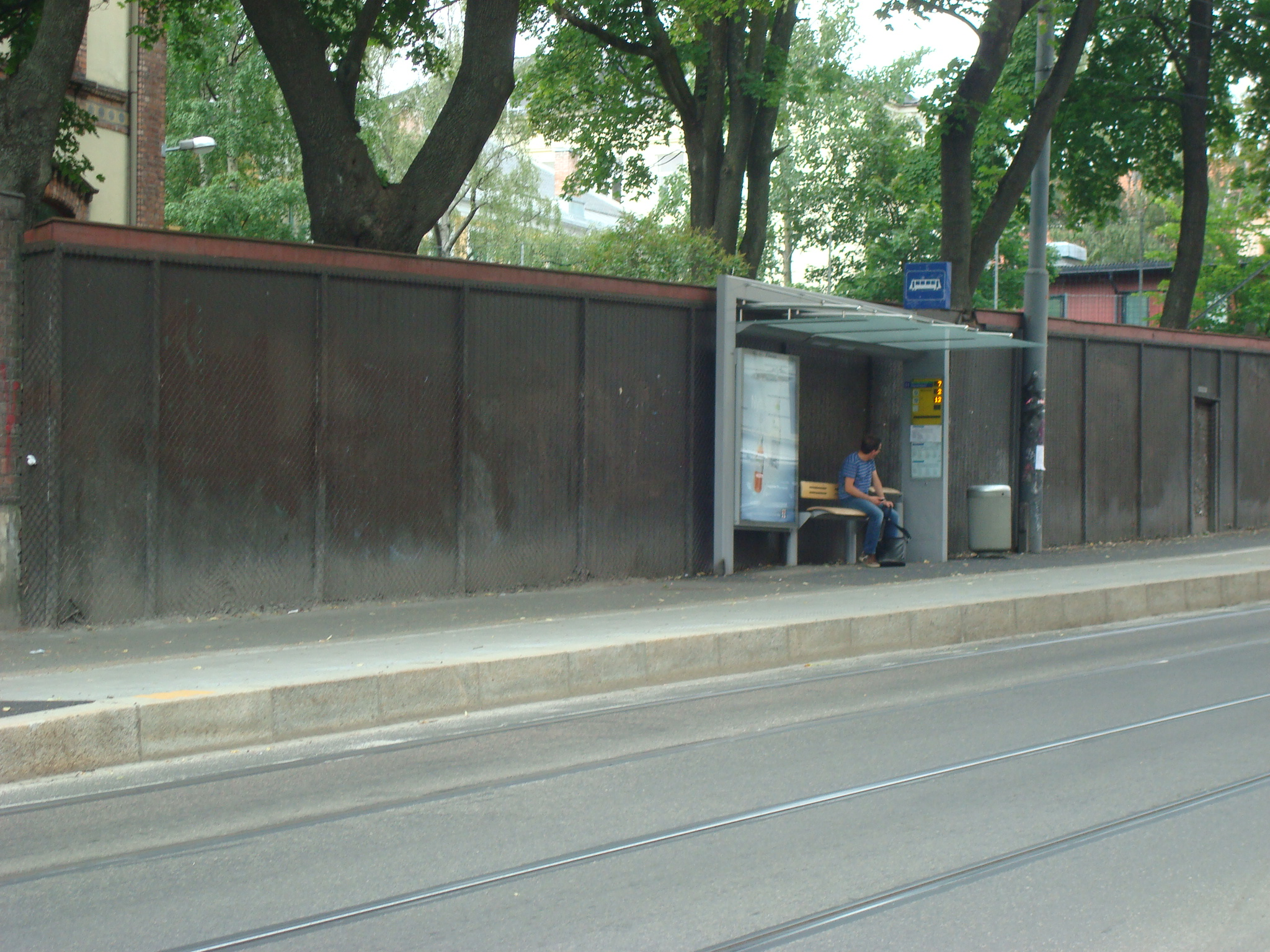
- Westbound shelter at Biermanns gate tram stop

General information
- Location: Grünerløkka, Oslo; Norway
- Coordinates: 59.93028°N 10.76104°E
- System: Tram or Light Rail Station
- Line: Grünerløkka–Torshov Line

History
- Opened: 1990

Services
Preceding station	Trams in Oslo	Following station
Birkelunden towards Majorstuen	Line 11	Torshov towards Kjelsås
Birkelunden towards Majorstuen	Line 12	Torshov towards Kjelsås
Birkelunden towards Rikshospitalet	Line 18	Torshov towards Grefsen
Route map
Location

Biermanns gate is a tram stop on the Grünerløkka-Torshov Line of the Oslo Tramway. It is served by lines 11, 12 and 18. It was opened in 1990, but trams operated on the street of Vogts gate, which is where it is located today, since 1899. This was because the Grünerløkka–Torshov Line was extended up further to Torshov.

== Station Location ==
It is located between Birkelunden and Torshov. Biermanns gate replaced the former station of Sannergata, which was located slightly south of Biermanns gate, at the intersection between Vogts gate and Sannergata. The shelters at the Biermanns gate station are staggered, so the westbound platform (on Vogts gate) is not directly facing the eastbound platform (on Toftes gate). The street of Biermanns gate runs between the two platforms. The tram stop is physically located between both the boroughs of Grünerløkka and Sagene.

== Connections ==
The station is served by three tram lines and two night bus services. Line 11, Line 12 and Line 18 serve the station. Therefore, a passenger travelling to the city-centre only needs to wait a maximum of 5 minutes at the platform. Night bus services, 11N and 12N also serve the station during the night period which lasts between 2 AM and 5-6 AM. The bus stop called Vogts gate (which is actually on Christian Michelsens gate) is served by route 28. There is a short, walkable distance between these two stations.
