= Alna Line =

Railway line in Norway

Coordinates: 59°55′54.78″N 10°48′23.14″E

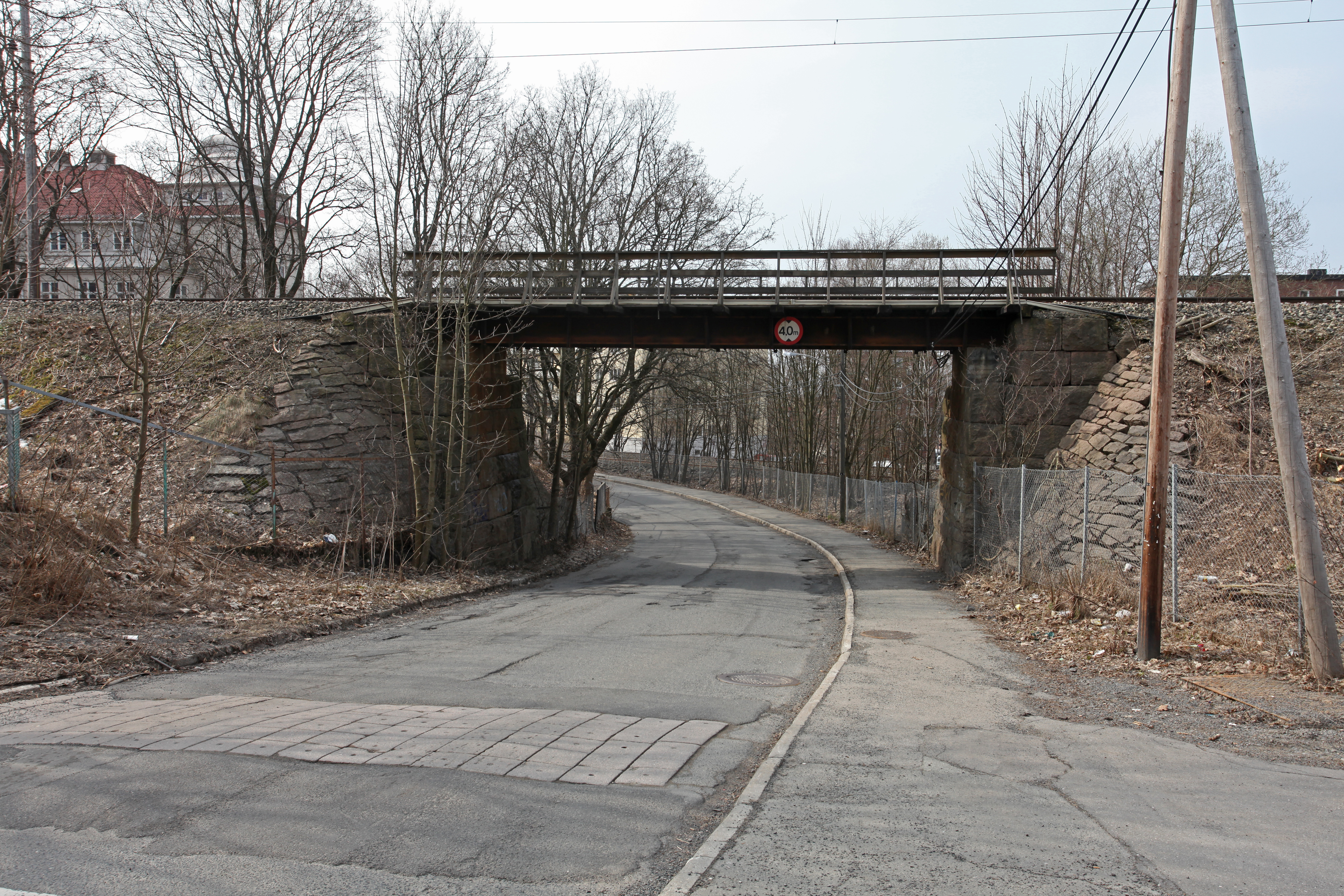
- Overpass over Sinsenveien

Overview
- Owner: Norwegian National Rail Administration
- Termini: Alnabru Station; Grefsen Station

Service
- Type: Railway
- System: Norwegian railway
- Operator(s): CargoNet, Cargolink

History
- Opened: 20 January 1901

Technical
- Line length: 4.3 km (2.7 mi)
- Number of tracks: Single
- Character: Freight
- Track gauge: 1,435 mm (4 ft 8 1/2 in)
- Electrification: 15 kV 16.7 Hz AC

The Alna Line (Norwegian: Alnabanen) is a 4.3-kilometer (2.7 mi) railway line between Alnabru and Grefsen in Oslo, Norway. The single track line allows direct access between the Trunk Line and the Gjøvik Line, without having to pass via Oslo Central Station. The line is electrified and is owned by the Norwegian National Rail Administration. It is exclusively used by freight trains, and allows trains on the Bergen Line to reach Alnabru Freight Terminal.

The line was built along with the Gjøvik Line and was opened on 20 January 1901. The line saw some passenger traffic until the Gjøvik Line was completed to Oslo East Station in 1902. From 1909 the Alna Line has been used for freight trains from Bergen, and the line was electrified in 1961. There have been proposals to make the line part of a diagonal line as part of the Oslo Commuter Rail.

== Route ==
The Alna Line is 4.3 kilometers (2.7 mi) long and connects the Gjøvik Line at Grefsen Station to Alnabru Freight Terminal on the Trunk Line. The line is single track, standard gauge and electrified at 15 kV 16.7 Hz AC. The line sees four to eight freight trains per day.

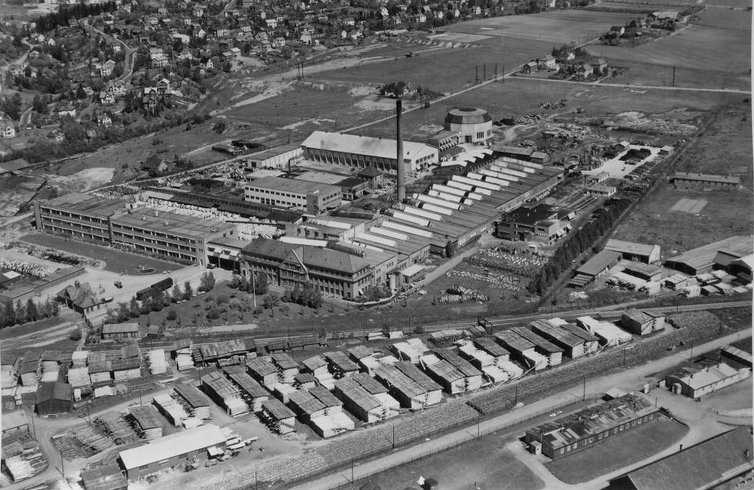
The Alna Line past the Standard Telephones and Cables factory at Økern in 1952

The line starts at Grefsen Station on the Gjøvik Line, which is located at 109.2 meters (358 ft) above mean sea level. The Alna Line runs on the west side of the Gjøvik Line for 1.09 kilometers (0.68 mi), passes under National Road 4 and then crosses the Gjøvik Line on a 22.9-meter (75 ft) bridge. The line passes past industrial spurs to among others Per Kure, Coop, Vinmonopolet and then crosses over Økernveien and National Road 150, on 52-and-26-meter (171 and 85 ft) bridges, the latter located 2.20 kilometers (1.37 mi) from Grefsen. The line continues past spurs to among others Arbor, Hesselberg and Standard Telephones and Cables and then crosses over the road Brobekkveien before reaching Alnabru.

== History ==
Plans for a railway running north of Oslo were launched in 1857. A railway committee for Hadeland, Toten and Gjøvik was established in 1874. It proposed a network of lines northwards to Lillehammer. Poor economic times caused the plans to placed on hold, but advocates resumed work in 1884, this time emphasizing the possibility of building a railway to Bergen via Valdres and Hallingdal. The line was voted down by Parliament in 1890 and 1892, until it was passed on 2 March 1895.

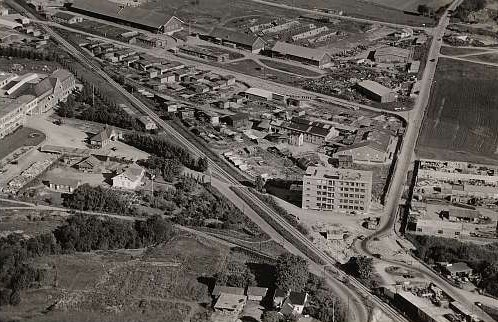
The line past Oslo Trelastkompani in 1951

From Oslo the line was originally planned to run from Oslo West Station around to Grorud and then head north, in a curve around town. This plan was abandoned on 22 July 1895, when Parliament decided that it should run from Oslo East Station (Oslo Ø) and via Maridalen. Construction commenced in November. The line was built with a trunk line standard, with 30 kilograms per meter (60 lb/yd) track. The first section of the line, the Gjøvik Line (then known as the North Line) from Grefsen to Jaren and the Røykenvik Line opened on 18 December 1900. The Alna Line opened on 20 January 1901.

Passenger trains heading to the Gjøvik Line thus ran from Oslo Ø via Alnabru Station and then on the Alna Line to Grefsen Station. This lasted until 28 November 1902, when the North Line segment between Oslo Ø and Grefsen opened. Freight trains to Bergen started using the Alna Line after the Bergen Line, which connects to the Gjøvik Line, opened on 27 November 1909. The Alna Line took electric traction into use on 1 February 1961, at the same time as the southern section of the Gjøvik Line.

== Commuter rail proposals ==
The Alna Line passes through a densely built-up neighborhood of Oslo with many jobs. There have therefore been proposals for the line to be used for a new line of the Oslo Commuter Rail which would link the southern part of the Gjøvik Line, particularly the Nydalen area, with the Trunk Line through Groruddalen. The National Rail Administration carried out an investigation into the proposals in 2005, but concluded that they would not be economical.

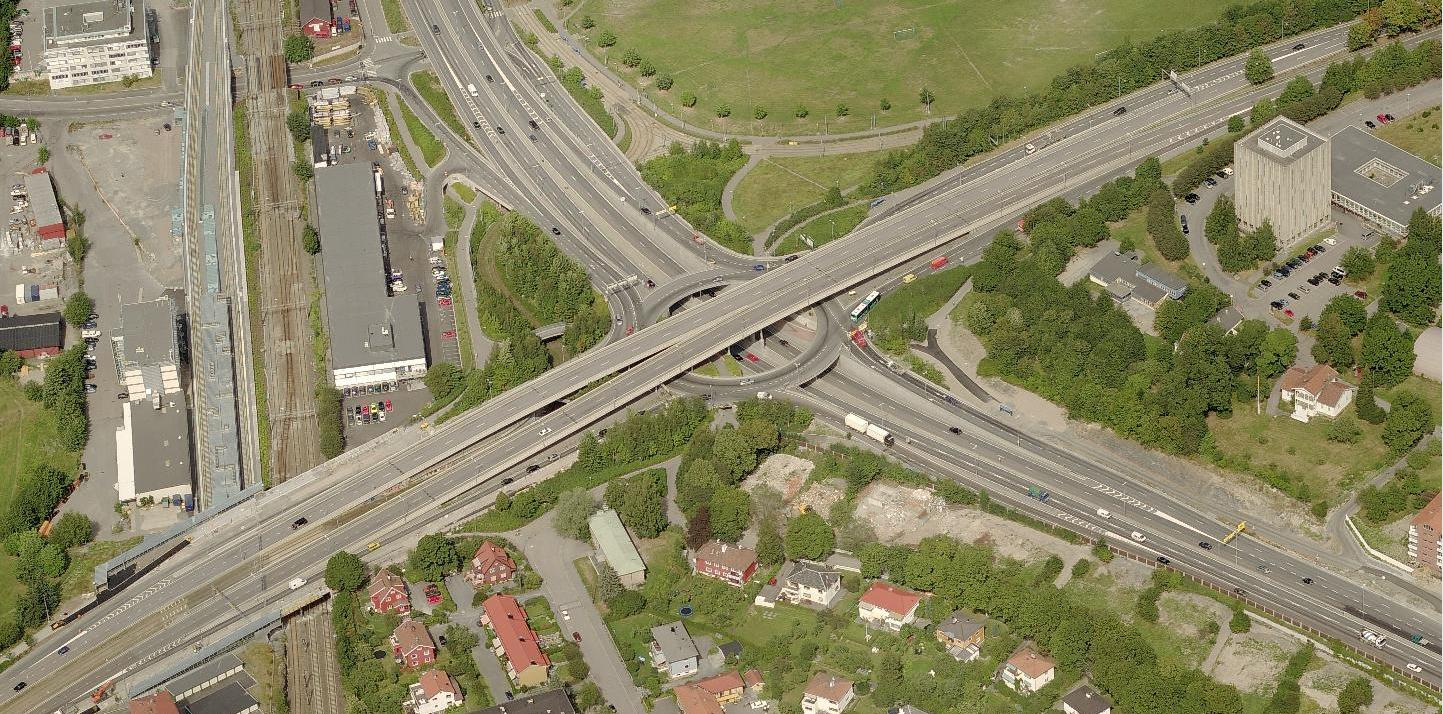
A section where the Alna Line and Grefsen Line run parallel next to the Sinsen Interchange

Ruter, the transit agency for Oslo and Akershus, carried out an investigation in 2011 to evaluate if passenger transport would be viable. It considered four main proposals: a service between Nydalen Station via the Alna Line to Lillestrøm Station; a service from Nydalen via the Alna Line and in a loop to Oslo S; a service e where the line was instead used by the Oslo Tramway; and a service which operated between Storo/Grefsen and Alna Station. It considered Økern the most viable location for a station, and also considered stations at Ulven, Løren and Sinsen. The report further called for the stop at Grefsen to be located at Storo Station of the Oslo Metro's Ring Line.

The report considered 15 and 30 minute headways. Travel time with two intermediate stops would be eight minutes between Alna and Storo. Half-hour services could be operated with a single multiple unit and still allow to freight trains to operate per hour. Fifteen-minute services would require three units and require the line to be expanded to double track. Infrastructure upgrades were estimated to 241 million Norwegian krone (NOK) for the less frequent service and NOK 572 million for the more frequent service. The service was estimated to have 4,300 passengers per day. The report concluded that services would have a negative net present value for society of NOK 487 or 812 million, depending on which service was provided.
