= Torshov tram stop =

Tram station in Oslo, Norway

Torshov
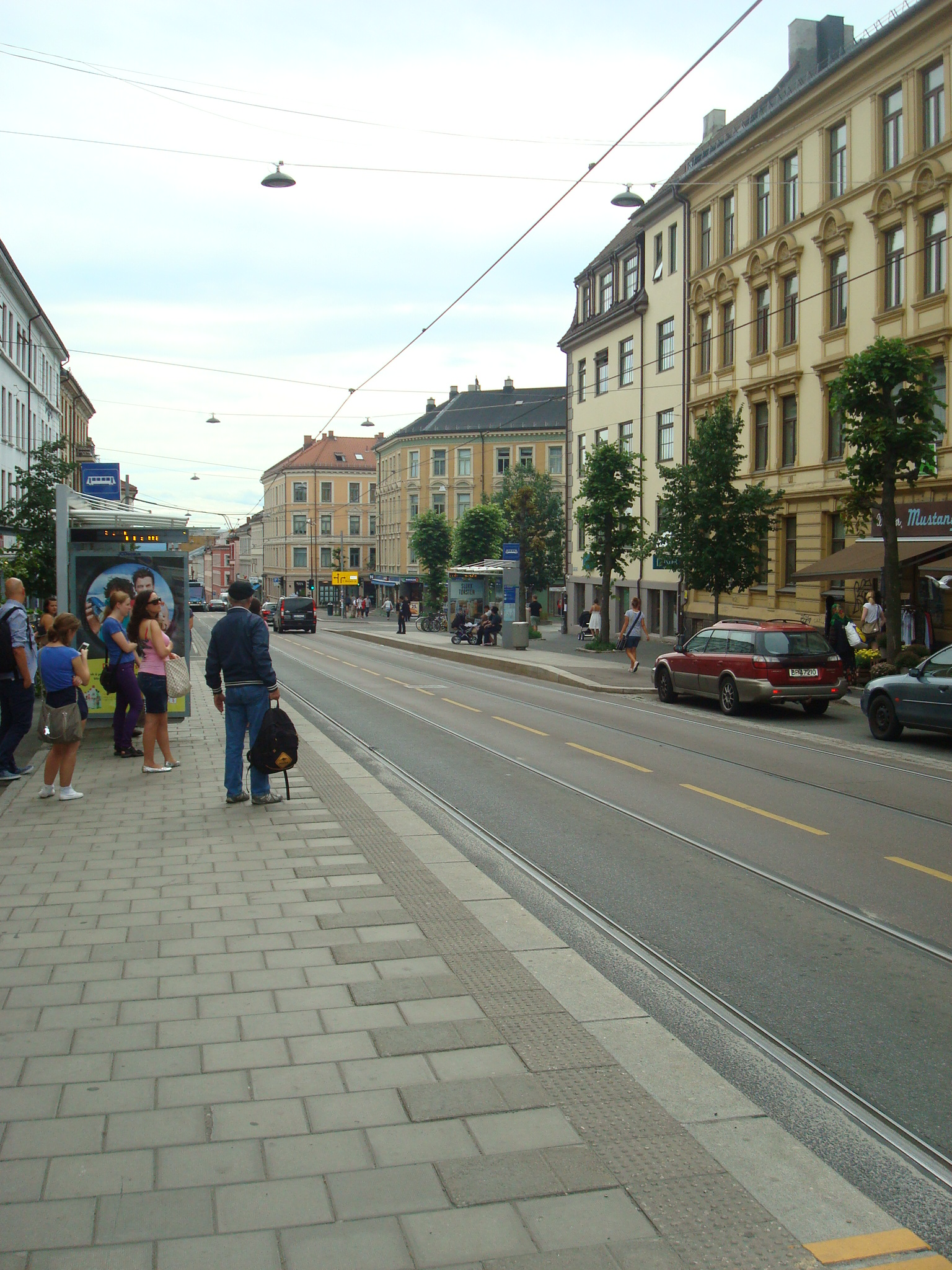
- Torshov tram stop with a SL79 tram approaching

General information
- Location: Torshov, Oslo, Norway
- System: Tram station in Oslo
- Operator: Sporveien Trikken
- Line: Grunerlokka-Torshov Line
- Tracks: Double
- Connections: Bus: 20 Skøyen - Galgeberg

Construction
- Structure type: at-grade

Other information
- Status: Operating
- Fare zone: 1

History
- Original company: Kristiania Sporveisselskab

Services
Preceding station	Trams in Oslo	Following station
Biermanns gate towards Majorstuen	Line 11	Sandaker senter towards Kjelsås
Biermanns gate towards Majorstuen	Line 12	Sandaker senter towards Kjelsås
Biermanns gate towards Rikshospitalet	Line 18	Sandaker senter towards Grefsen
Route map
Location

Torshov is one of the tram stops on the Oslo Tramway network. Located in the borough of Sagene in Oslo, Norway, it is served by three tram routes, two night bus services and a bus stop is located within walking distance and is served by route 20 of Ruter's extensive bus network. Trams began serving the area where the station is currently located since the 29th of September, 1899.

== Service ==
The station is served by three tram lines, Line 11, Line 12 and Line 18. On Hegermanns gate, there is a bus stop which is served by Line 20. The station itself is located on Vogts gate, the major street running throughout the area of Torshov. Night bus services also operate here from 2 a.m until 5-6 a.m. There are some disused tracks near Bentsebrugata, where trams would diverge from the main line to the former Sagene line. The station is located between Biermanns gate and Sandaker senter.

== Torshov depot ==
When the line was extended to Grefsen station in 1899, the former depot at Thorvald Meyers gate 47 near Olaf Ryes plass was closed down and replaced with the Torshov depot. It was created by Kristiania Sporveisselskab with the capability of storing 28 trams. It was located at Torshovgata 33. During the Second World War, this was where Oslo's first trolleybus was parked. The depot was taken out of use in 1977, after the new depot at Grefsen was established. It was disused until it became a cultural center & a theatre in 2003. The cultural centre is still in use as "Oslo Nye Trikkestallen".

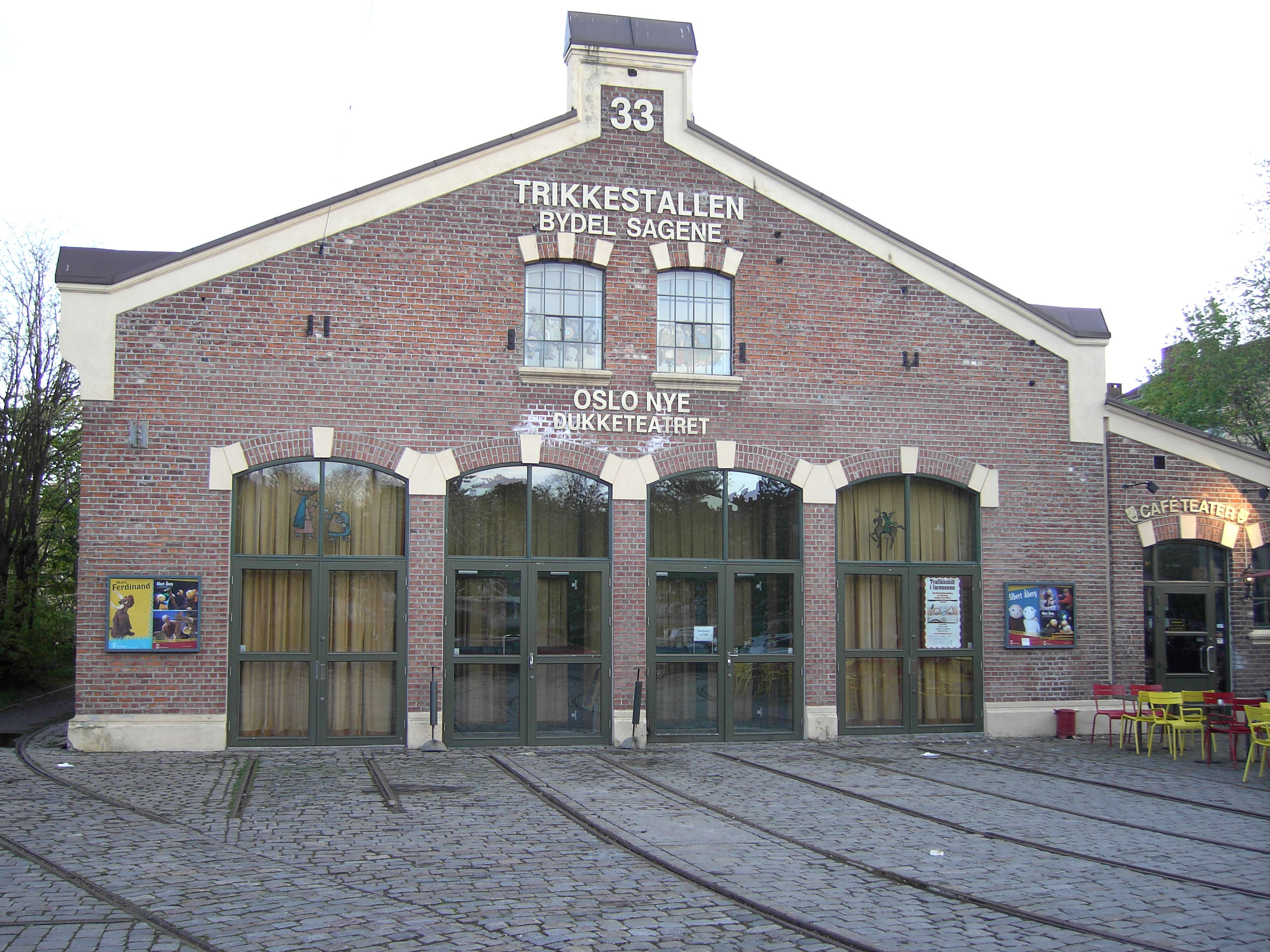
The former Torshov depot. This photo was taken in 2009.
