= Bryn Station =

Railway station in Oslo, Norway

Bryn
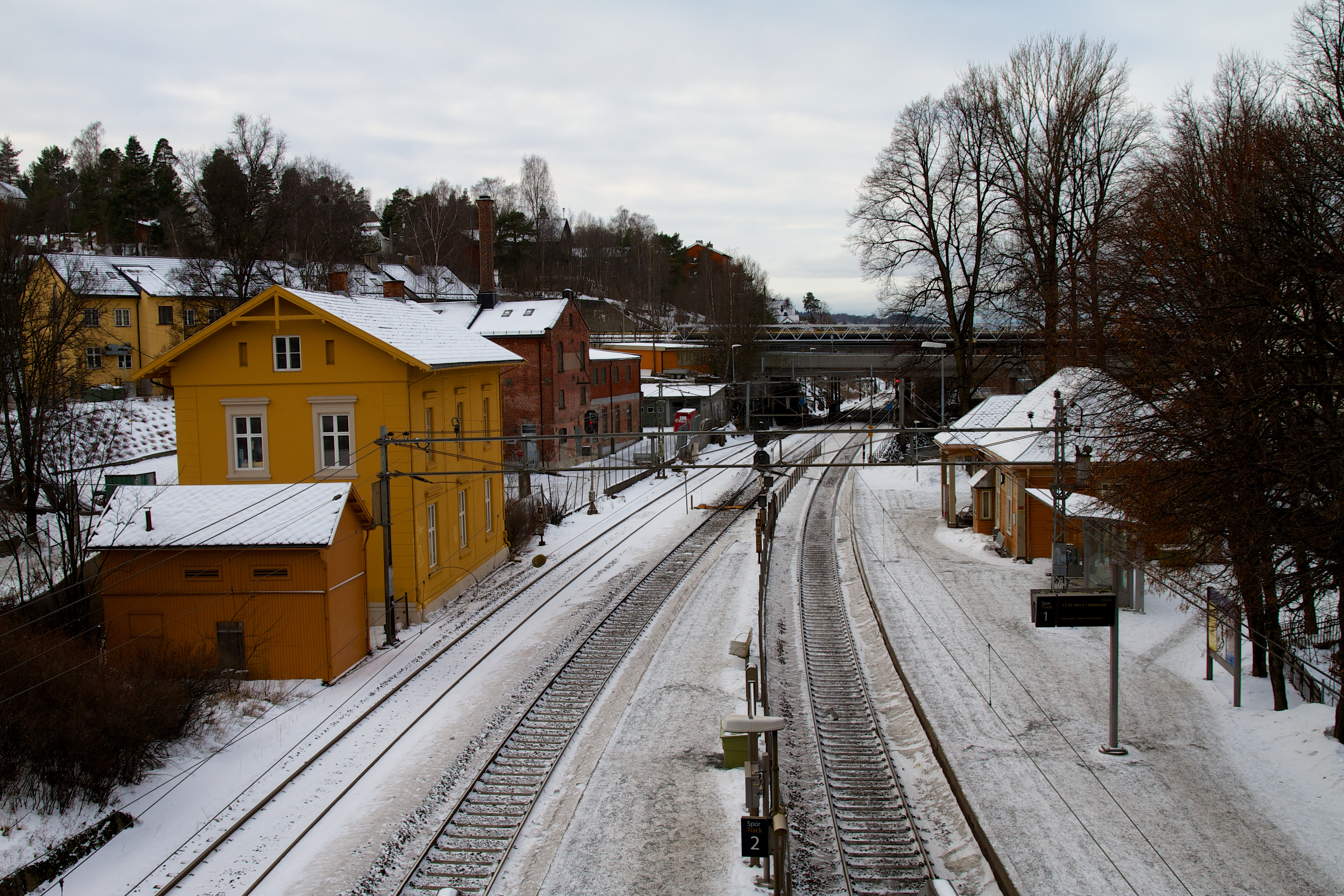

General information
- Location: Bryn, Gamle Oslo, Oslo; Norway
- Coordinates: 59°54′30″N 10°49′8″E
- Elevation: 78.3 m (257 ft) AMSL
- Owner: Bane NOR
- Operator: Vy
- Line: Trunk Line
- Distance: 3.89 km (2.42 mi) from Oslo S
- Platforms: 2
- Tracks: 2

Construction
- Accessible: Only track 1
- Architect: Finn Ivar Andreas Knudsen

Other information
- Fare zone: 1

History
- Opened: 1 September 1854; 172 years ago
- Rebuilt: 1884; 142 years ago, 1902; 124 years ago
Location
- Location within Akershus

Bryn Station (Norwegian: Bryn stasjon) is a railway station on the Trunk Line located in the Bryn neighborhood of the Gamle Oslo borough of Oslo, Norway. Situated 3.89 kilometers (2.42 mi) from Oslo Central Station, it features two platforms. The Loenga–Alnabru Line passes through the station without a platform. Bryn is served by the L1 line of Vy's Oslo Commuter Rail. The station is also nearby Bryn school.

The station was opened on 1 September 1854, but was originally only a halt to test brakes. Ticket sales commenced in 1858. A new, brick station building was erected in 1884. A new wooden station building was finished on the north side in 1902, designed by and is one of Norway's nine first stations. The original building, designed by Finn Ivar Andreas Knudsen. The station has been proposed redeveloped as a major transit hub for eastern Oslo.

== History ==
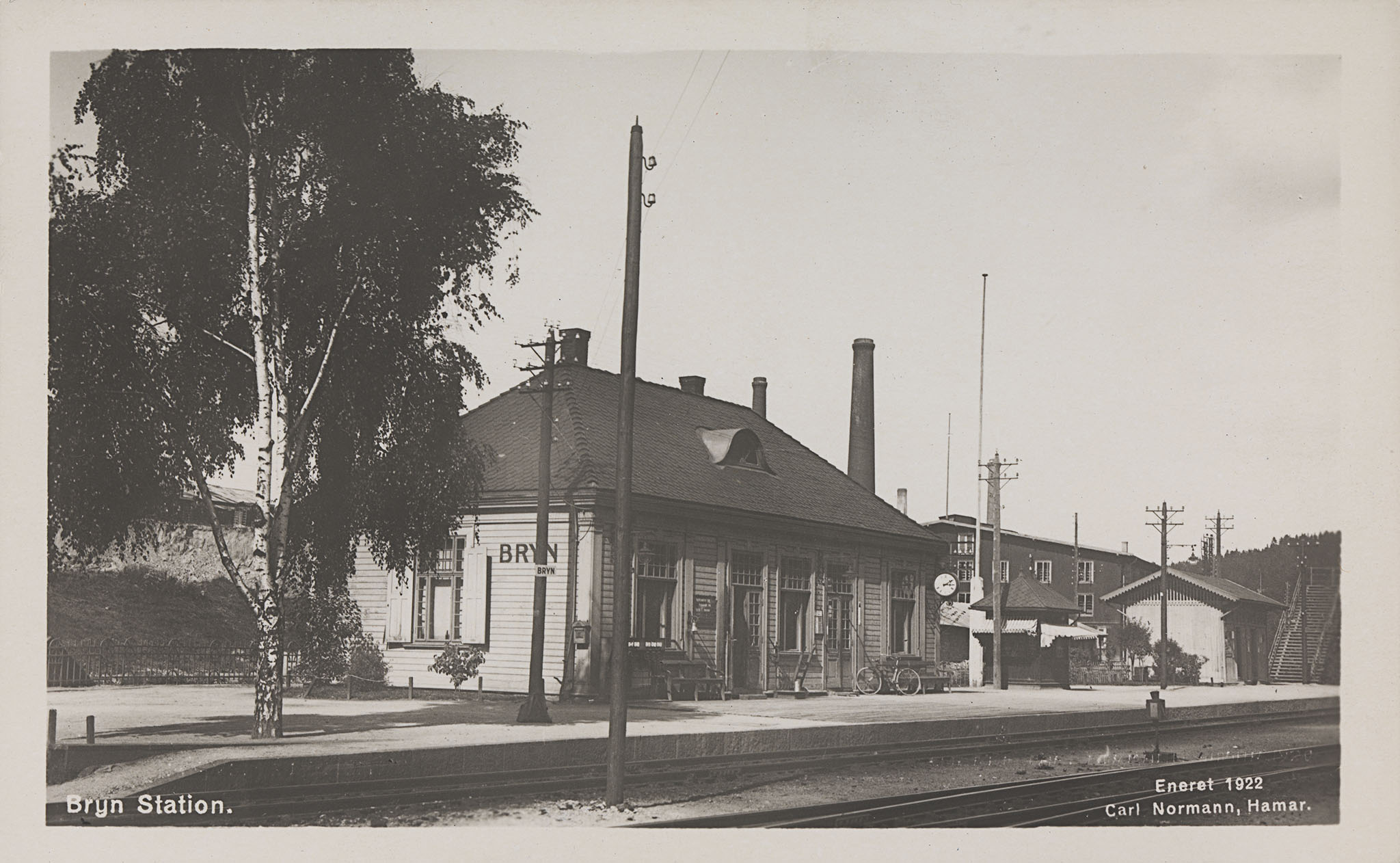
The 1902 station building

When the Trunk Line opened as the first railway in Norway on 1 September 1854, Bryn was merely a halt used to test brakes for west-bound trains towards Christiania. The station was named for the farm Bryn, which means "natural meadow". It was not classified as a station, but it was therefore possible to board and disembark in that direction. From 2 June 1856 trains in both direction stopped at Bryn. In the third year of operations the railway built a spur from the halt. Bryn received a ticket office the following year and in about 1860 it was fully classified as a station.

The area saw a rapid industrialization with the arrival of the railway, helped by the falls in Alna. Soon afterwards housing started being built in the area. The original wooden station building at Bryn was demolished, and replaced with a new in brick in 1884.

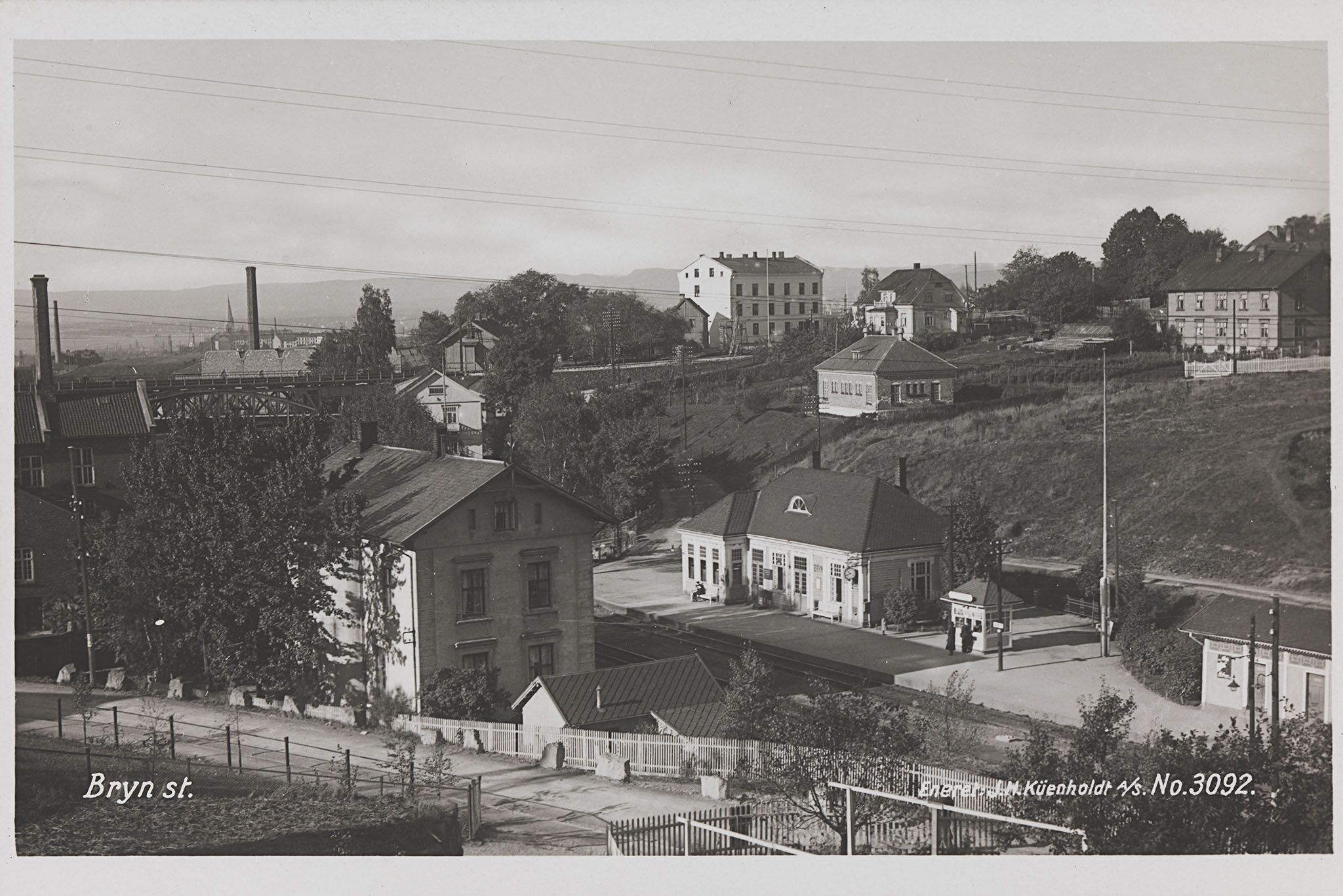
The station sometime after 1902

By the 1890s the Trunk Line was experiencing sufficient traffic that the railway company decided to build double track on the line from Christiania to Lillestrøm Station. At the same time a new freight line, the Loenga–Alnabru Line, was constructed and met up with the Trunk Line at Bryn. This forced the need for a new station building on the opposite, north side of the tracks, which opened in 1902. The former station building was kept and used as a residence for the station master. At the same time the two roads which crossed the tracks as level crossings were replaced with bridges. With the upgrades a simple interlocking system was installed.

The Østensjø Line of the Oslo Tramway opened past Bryn in 1923. The railway past the station was electrified from on 1 September 1927. The station received a complete interlocking system from 23 April 1939. The tram line was converted to a metro line in 1966. Bryn Station received centralized traffic control from 24 January 1972, allowing it to be unstaffed from 1 July 1975.

== Facilities ==
Bryn Station is situated 3.89 kilometers (2.42 mi) from Oslo Central Station, at an elevation of 78 meters (256 ft) above mean sea level. The station is located at the top of a hill, Brynsbakken, which represents a steep climb for all west-bound freight trains. The wooden station building was designed by Finn Ivar Andreas Knudsen. Across from the station building is a brick Swiss chalet style building which previously served as a station master's residence. It is now the headquarters of the Norwegian Railway Club.

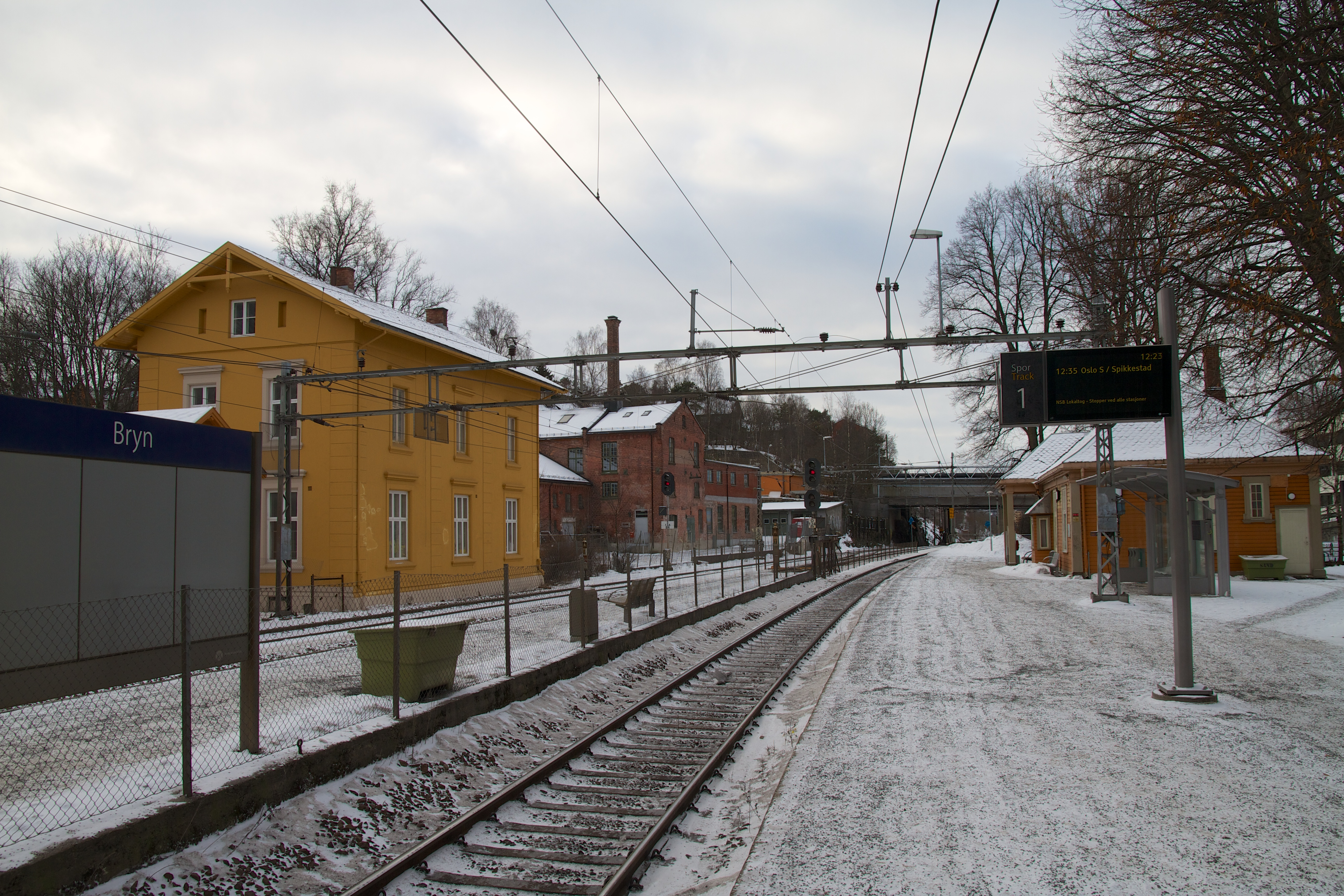
The west-bound platform

The line past Bryn is double track and electrified. The station features two platforms, both 385 meters (1,263 ft) long. They are 54 and 60 centimeters (21 and 24 in) tall, respectively. A third track, the Loenga–Alnabru Line, passes through the station, but there are no platforms along that track. It is only used by freight trains. Platform 1 is universally accessible. Track 2 has access via an overpass which also carries Adolf Hedins vei. This road concurrently carries E6 and Ring 3.

== Service ==
The Norwegian State Railways serves Grorud with line L1 of the Oslo Commuter Rail. L1 calls at all stations, running from Lillestrøm Station along the Trunk Line past Grorud to Oslo Central Station and then along the Drammen Line to Asker Station before serving the Spikkestad Line and terminating at Spikkestad Station. Grorud has four trains per direction per hour. Travel time is 4 minutes to Oslo Central Station and 25 minutes to Lillestrøm. Brynseng Station of the Oslo Metro is situated within five minutes' walk of Bryn. The area is also served by Ruter's bus line 23. Bryn is within fare zone 1.

== Future ==
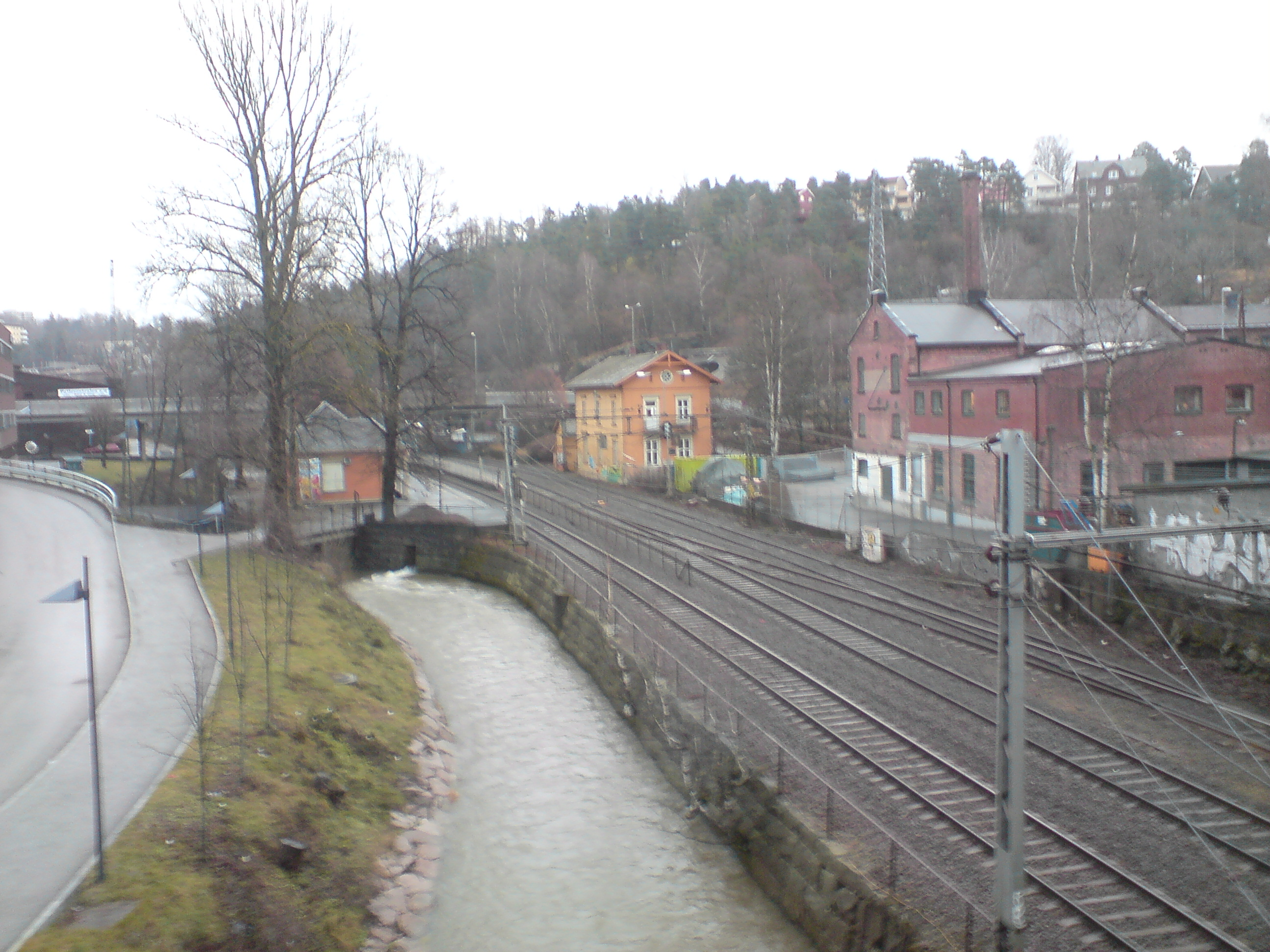
The station looking west, with the Alna River and the Loenga–Alnabru Line furthest away

The National Rail Administration and Ruter have in their Oslo Hub reports identified Bryn as one of three main public transit hubs they wish to develop. The area already features a metro station which covers three metro lines, Østensjø, Lambertseter and Furuset, although the two stations to not have easy access to each other. The railway station has poor access and narrow platforms. An upgrade of the station has been called for, in which the tracks would be moved closer to the river and an island platform established. It could have access from Østensjøveien. Establishing a new hub at Bryn would not only involve several new lines terminating there, but would also require a significant urban renewal of the area.

Oslo Bus Terminal has reached its capacity and Ruter wants to decentralize this function. Due to the vicinity to Ring 3 and E6, Bryn has been identified as a suitable location for a south-easterly bus terminal. The Romerike Tunnel passes straight under the metro station. It has been built in such a way that it can easily be rebuilt to feature an underground railway station, situated 43 meters (141 ft) below street level. Ruter is also working with plans to rebuild Ring 2 as a tramway and build a tram line from Carl Berners plass. In addition they have proposed a tram line from Bryn to Økern and Sinsen.

The 2.6 percent gradient of Brynsbakken makes it difficult to achieve effective freight operations to Alnabru Freight Terminal. The Norwegian National Rail Administration is exploring various concepts to build a new line which connects to the Østfold Line, bypassing Brynsbakken and Bryn Station. This has been named the Bryn Diagonal. Beyond determining that such a connection will not be tied to the new Follo Line, no decision has yet been made.

== Bibliography ==
- Bjerke, Thor; Holom, Finn (2004). Banedata 2004 (in Norwegian). Hamar / Oslo: Norwegian Railway Museum / Norwegian Railway Club. ISBN 82-90286-28-7.
- Faveo Prosjektledelse (2013). Utredning av ny Godsforbindelse til Alnabru (in Norwegian). Archived from the original (PDF) on 3 June 2016.
- Hartmann, Eivind; Mangset, Øistein; Reisegg, Øyvind (1997). Neste stasjon (in Norwegian). Gyldendal. ISBN 82-05-25294-7.
- Norwegian Trunk Railway (1904). Norsk Hoved-Jernbane i femti aar (in Norwegian).

Preceding station			Following station
Oslo S	Trunk Line		Alna
Preceding station	Local trains		Following station
Oslo S	L1	Spikkestad–Oslo S–Lillestrøm	Alna
