= Tøyen station =

Railway station in Oslo, Norway

Tøyen
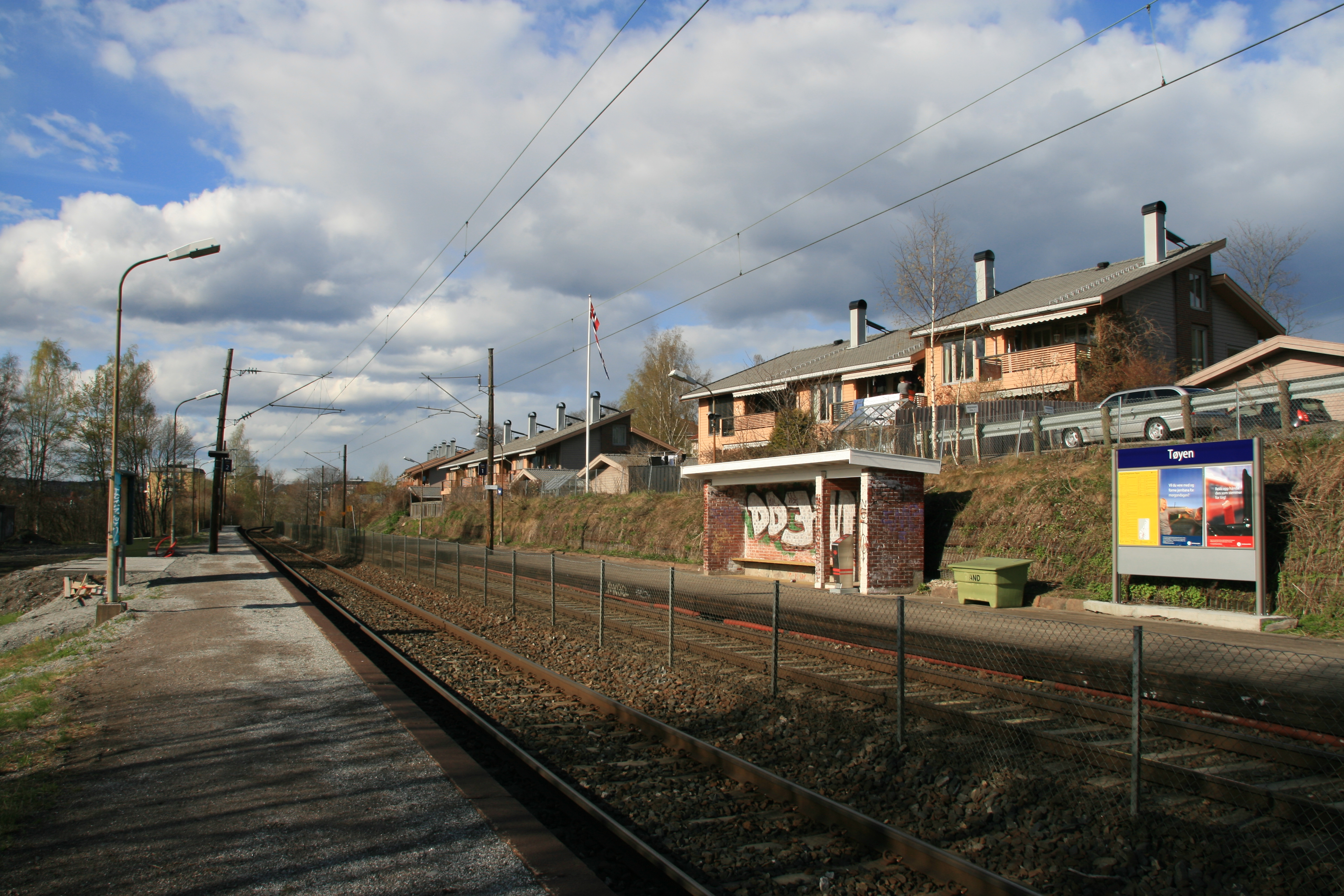

General information
- Location: Tøyen Park (west); Keyserløkka (east), Oslo; Norway
- Coordinates: 59°55′15″N 10°46′50″E
- Elevation: 75.2 m (247 ft)
- Owner: Bane NOR
- Operator: Vy Gjøvikbanen
- Line: Gjøvik Line
- Distance: 4.45 km
- Platforms: 2

History
- Opened: 1904
Location

Tøyen Station (Norwegian: Tøyen stasjon) is a railway station located in Oslo on the Gjøvik Line. It is located in the borough of Grünerløkka and is the first stop on the line after Oslo Central Station. The station was opened in 1904. It is a small unstaffed station which is only served by local trains by Vy Gjøvikbanen. It is 4.45 km from Oslo S.

1400 meters from the railway station is the metro station with the same name, located on the Oslo Metro. There is no tram/metro/train connection between the two stations. There is a bus route, 60, from Tøyen to Tøyen stasjon.

Preceding station			Following station
Oslo S	Gjøvik Line		Grefsen
Preceding station	Local trains		Following station
Oslo S	R31	Oslo S–Jaren	Grefsen
