= Bryn, Oslo =

Neighborhood of Oslo, Norway

Coordinates: 59.9101°N 10.8148°E

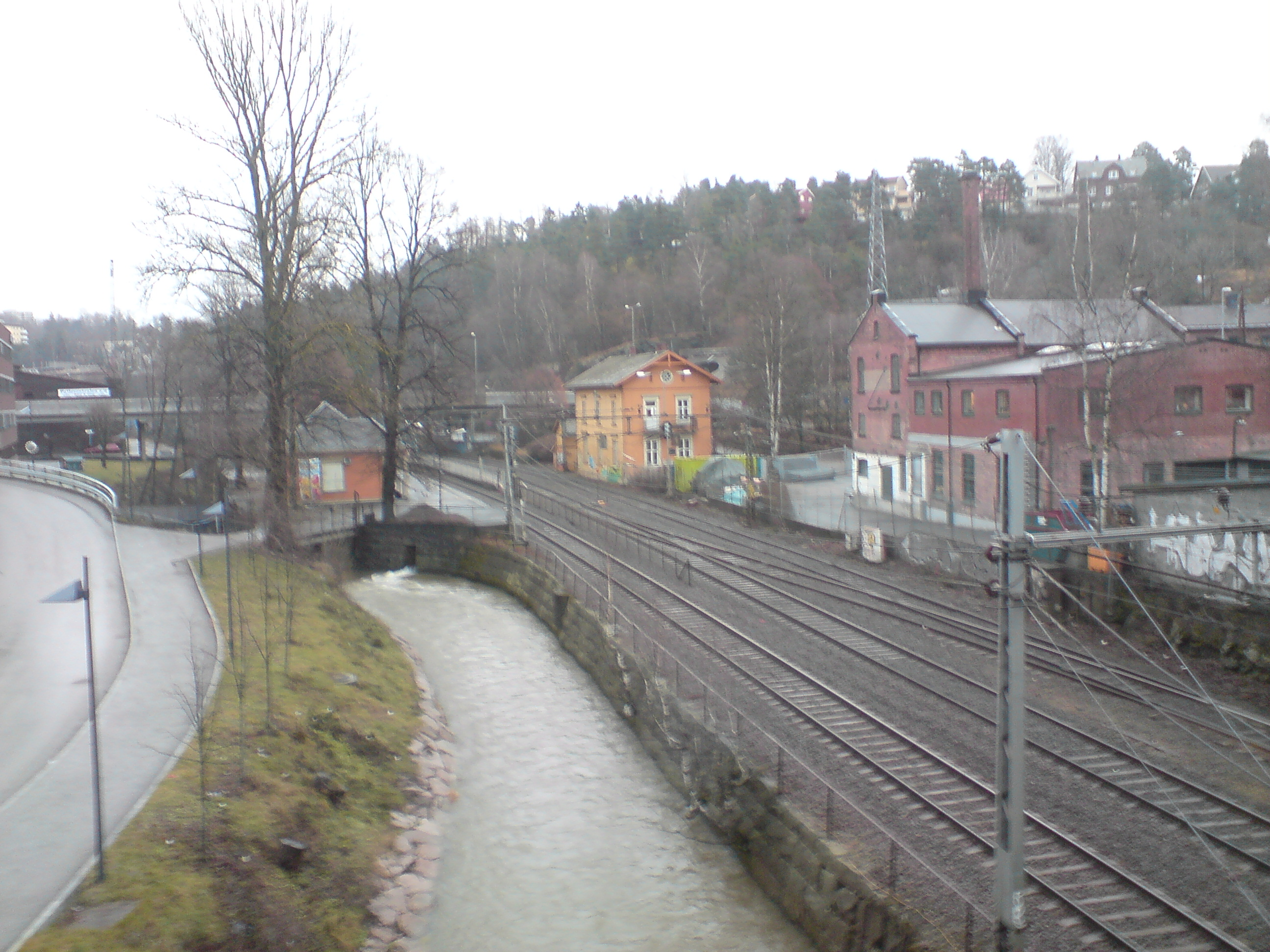
The Alna River and the Trunk Line runs through Bryn, with Bryn Station (yellow) seen to the right

Bryn is a residential and industrial area of Oslo, Norway, located in the Gamle Oslo borough. The Alna River runs through the neighborhood, and it is home to the Bryn Station Trunk Line railway station.
