= Alna station =

Railway station in Oslo, Norway

Alna
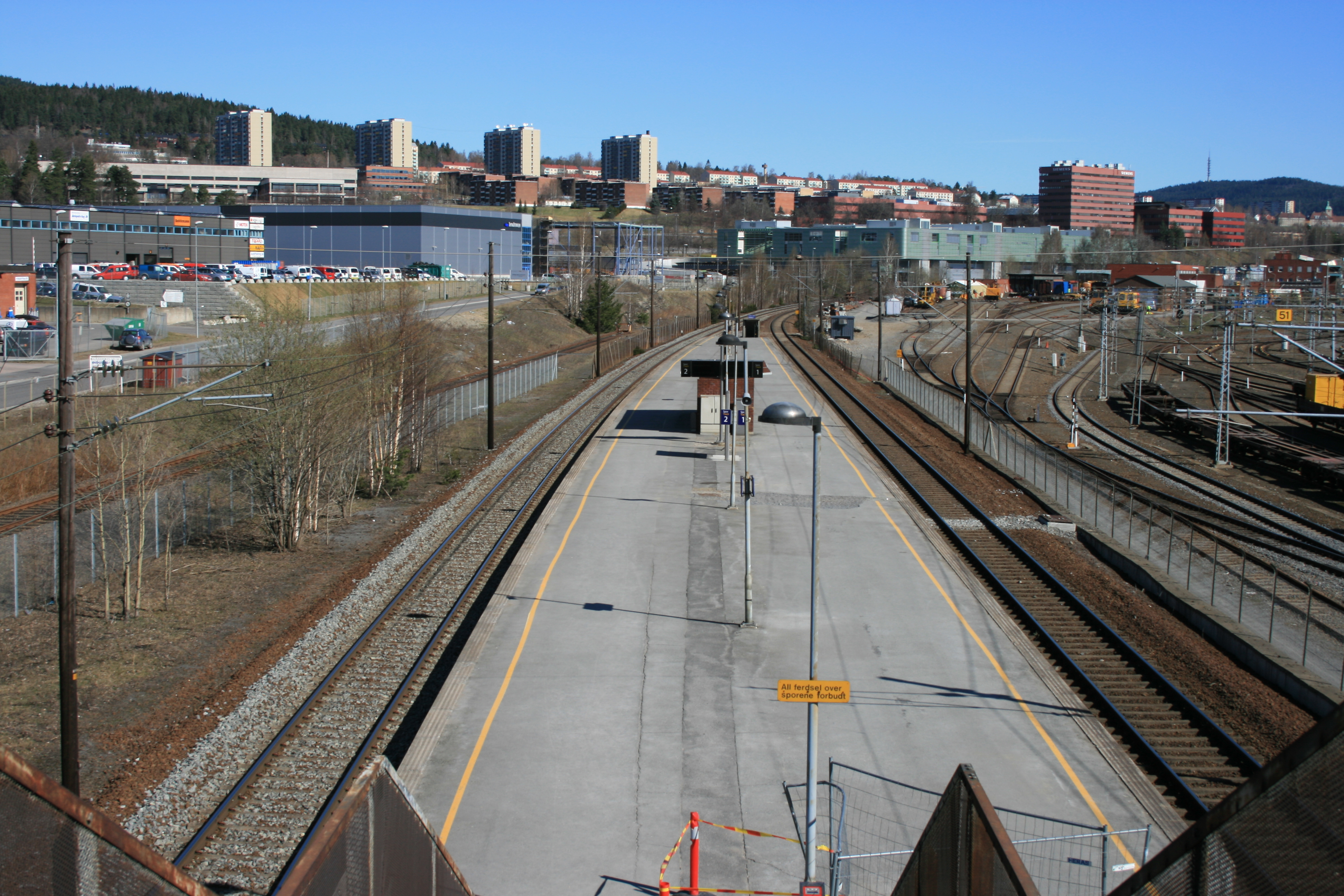

General information
- Location: Alna, Oslo; Norway
- Coordinates: 59°55′57″N 10°50′07″E
- Owner: Bane NOR
- Operator: Vy
- Line: Trunk Line
- Distance: 6.87 km (4.27 mi)
- Platforms: 1 island platform

Other information
- Fare zone: 1

History
- Opened: June 7, 1971
Location
- Location within Akershus

Alna Station (Norwegian: Alna holdeplass) is a railway station on the Trunk Line located at Alnabru in the Alna borough of Oslo, Norway. Situated 6.87 kilometers (4.27 mi) from Oslo Central Station, it consists of an island platform along a double tracked line. Alna is served by the L1 line of the Oslo Commuter Rail. The station was opened on 7 June 1971, replacing Alnabru Station. The former was dismantled to make room for Alnabru Freight Terminal. The station serves mostly an industrial area.

== History ==
When the Trunk Line was completed in 1854 there was no station serving the Alna area. From the 1880s there was a growing industry in the area. There was a station named Alna which was established on 24 March 1872, but was closed already on 1 December 1873. Alnabru Station at roughly the same place opened on 20 January 1902. It initially took the name Alna, but this was changed to Alnabru on 1 May. The station was a major cargo terminal and the terminal of two freight lines, the Alna Line and the Loenga–Alnabru Line.

The Norwegian State Railways bought the farm Nordre Alna in 1918, allowing for a further development of the station. The site was eventually determined to act as the new main cargo yard for Oslo. Alnabru Freight Terminal was taken into use in 1970. This forced the Trunk Line to be rerouted past the freight yard, resulting in a new 1.1-kilometer (0.68 mi) section of track being built on the north side. Alna Station was placed on this segment. The new station was taken into use for trains in the direction of Oslo from 7 June 1971. The other track was taken into use on 14 June. The same day Alnabru Station was closed and subsequently demolished. Alna Station was originally named Alnabru, but took the name Alna in February 1973.

== Facilities ==
Alna Station is situated 6.87 kilometers (4.27 mi) from Oslo Central Station. The line past Alna is double track and electrified. The station features an island platform with a shed. The platform is 232 meters (761 ft) and 55 centimeters (22 in) tall. The station is not step-free, as access is provided by an overpass with stairs. The station lacks a ticket machine.

== Service ==
Vy serves Alna with line L1 of the Oslo Commuter Rail. L1 calls at all stations, running from Lillestrøm Station along the Trunk Line past Alna to Oslo Central Station and then along the Drammen Line to Asker Station before serving the Spikkestad Line and terminating at Spikkestad Station. Alna has four trains per direction per hour. Travel time is 7 minutes to Oslo Central Station and 22 minutes to Lillestrøm.

== Bibliography ==
- Bjerke, Thor; Holom, Finn (2004). Banedata 2004 (in Norwegian). Hamar / Oslo: Norsk Jernbanemuseum / Norsk Jernbaneklubb. ISBN 82-90286-28-7.

| Preceding station | | | Following station |
|---|---|---|---|
| Bryn | Trunk Line | | Nyland |
| Preceding station | Local trains | | Following station |
| Bryn | L1 | Spikkestad–Oslo S–Lillestrøm | Nyland |
