= Sjursøya =

Peninsula in Oslo, Norway

Coordinates: 59°53′17″N 10°45′17″E

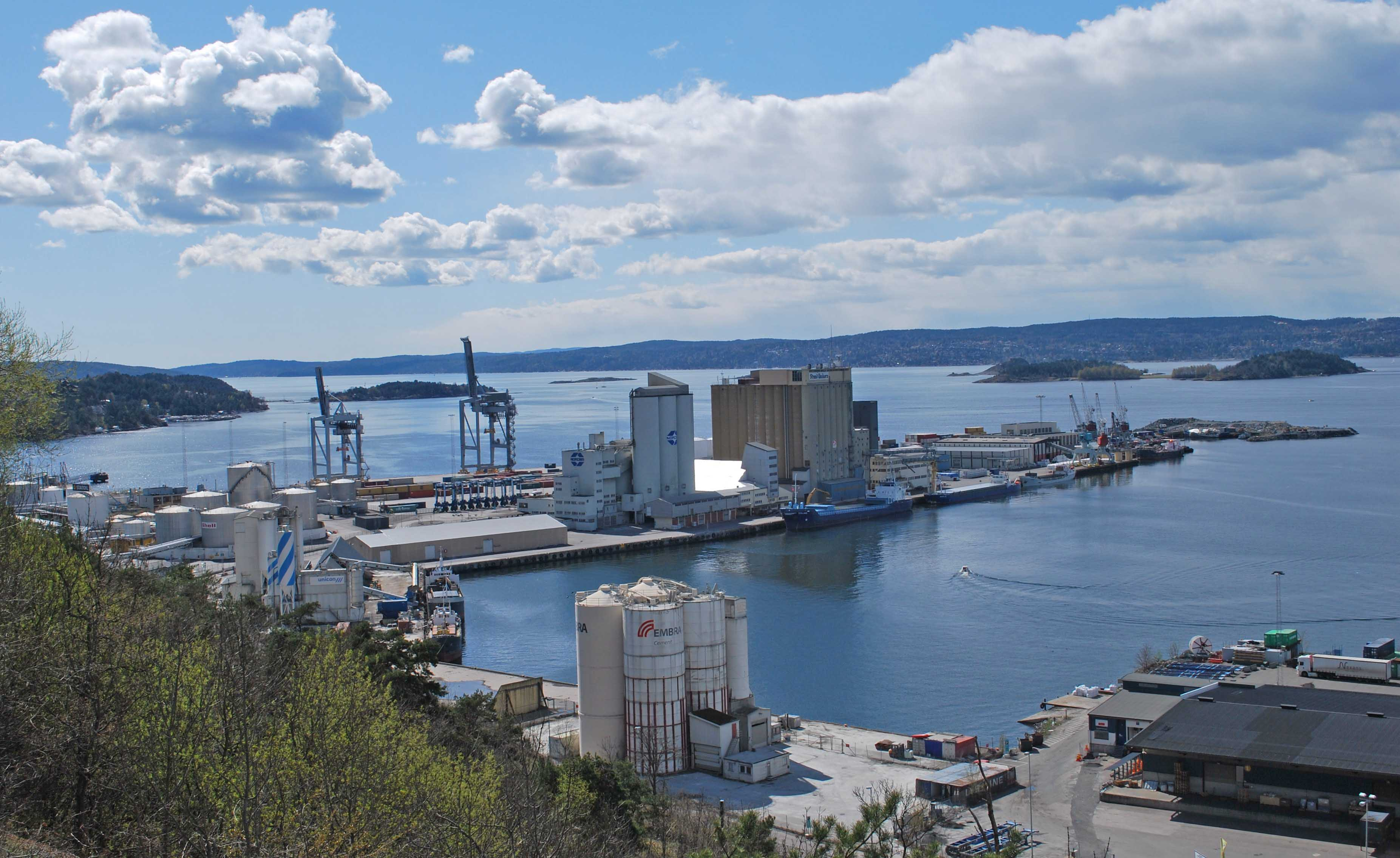
Sjursøya

Sjursøya is a peninsula located in Oslo, Norway. The peninsula is entirely used by the Port of Oslo as a container and petroleum port, and serves as the primary oil port for Eastern Norway.

A train accident occurred at Sjursøya on 24 March 2010, when a runaway set of 16 empty carriages belonging to CargoNet crashed into a terminal building at high speed. This incident caused 3 deaths and 4 injured persons.

== The name ==
The first element is the genitive form of the male name Sjur (from Norse Sigurðr) - the last element is the finite form of øy ('island').
