= Alnabru =

Industrial area in Oslo, Norway

Coordinates: 59°55′42.157″N 10°50′41.87″E

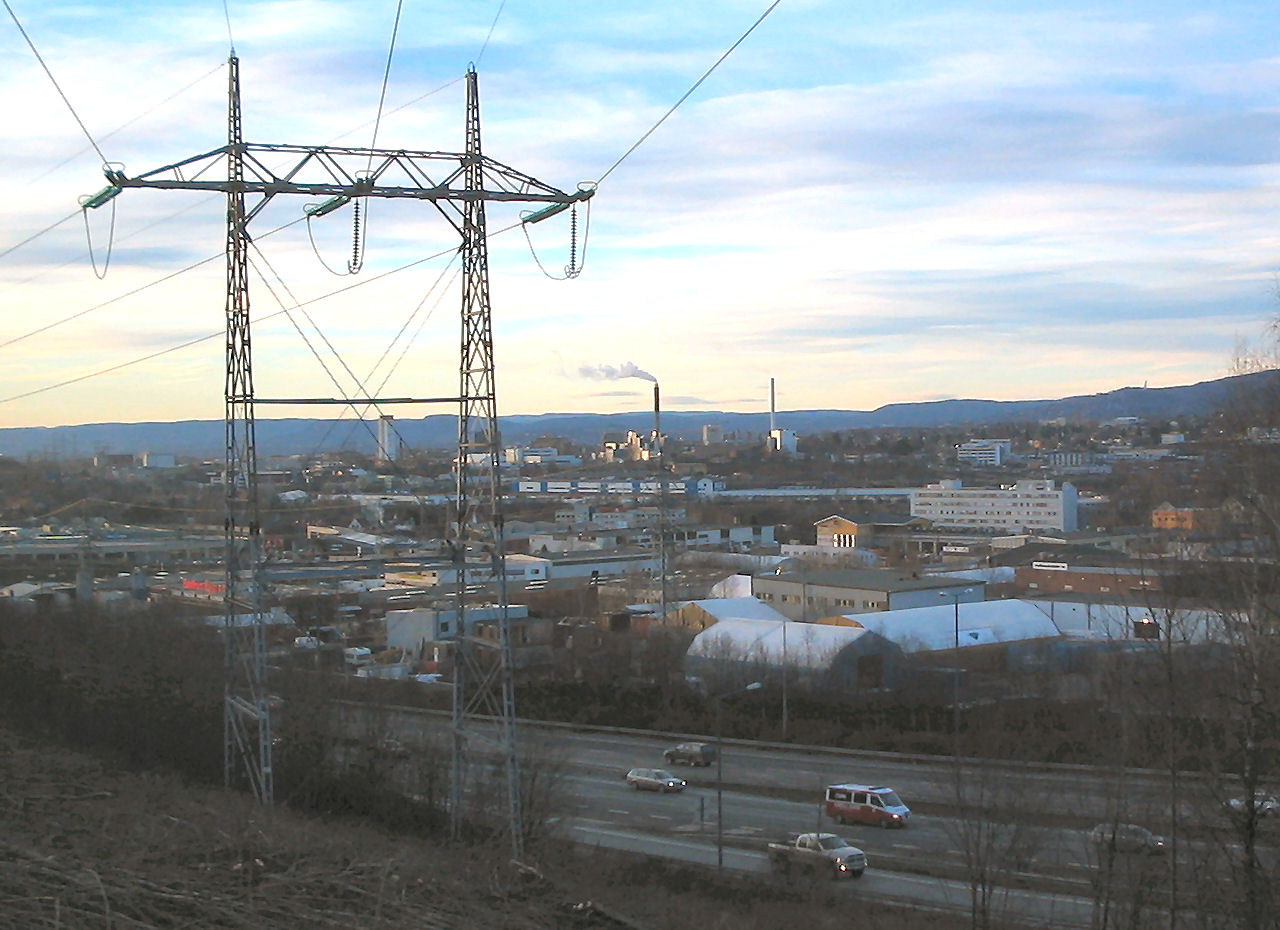
View across the E6 at Alnabru

Alnabru is a neighbourhood of north-eastern Oslo. It lies in the middle of the southern part of the Grorud valley (Groruddalen). The name – which means "Alna bridge" – comes from that of the Alna River, from which are also derived the names of the old Alna Gård estate and the borough of Alna, in which Alnabru is located.

The area is an industrial one, known for its rail freight terminal on the Hovedbanen trunk line. Occupying the site of the former Alnabru railway station, this is Oslo's main terminal for the transport of produce. Some 300 metres further along the line is Alna station, which opened in 1971 to replace the old passenger facilities. European route E6 also runs through the area.

Alnabru is home to one of Norway's oldest Sikh temples, opened in 1983.
