= Nydalen station =

Railway station in Oslo, Norway

Nydalen
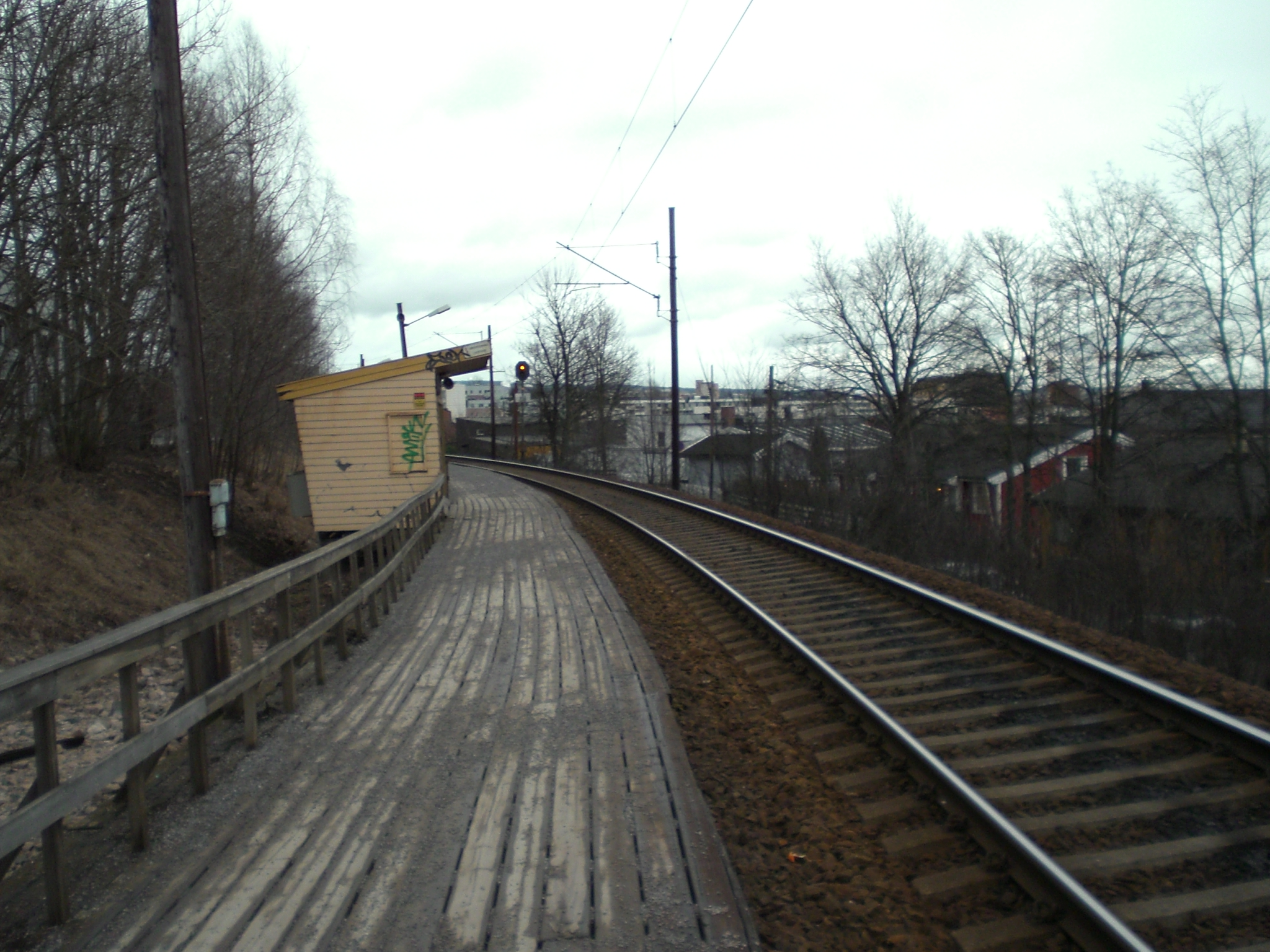

General information
- Location: Nydalen, Oslo; Norway
- Coordinates: 59°57′08″N 10°46′08″E
- Owner: Bane NOR
- Operator: Vy Gjøvikbanen
- Line: Gjøvik Line
- Distance: 8.13 km (5.05 mi)
- Platforms: 1

History
- Opened: 1946
Location

Nydalen station (Norwegian: Nydalen holdeplass) is a railway station on the Gjøvik Line in Oslo, Norway. The station was built opened in 1946, and is located between Grefsen and Kjelsås. Like most of the local Oslo stations on the Gjøvik Line, Nydalen is a small station. It is unstaffed, has only a single wooden platform, and is served only by commuter trains. Close by, but not in connection, is a subway station with the same name, Nydalen.

The station is located in Nordre Aker borough. The area around the stations is largely industrial, though the area (Nydalen) is gradually being changed into a more residential-industrial mix. Close by is BI Norwegian Business School campus.

On December 23, 2009, the station was reopened following upgrades to the station infrastructure.

Preceding station			Following station
Grefsen	Gjøvik Line		Kjelsås
Preceding station	Regional trains		Following station
Grefsen	RE30	Oslo S–Gjøvik	Kjelsås
Preceding station	Local trains		Following station
Grefsen	R31	Oslo S–Jaren	Kjelsås
