= Grefsen station =

Railway station in Oslo, Norway

Grefsen
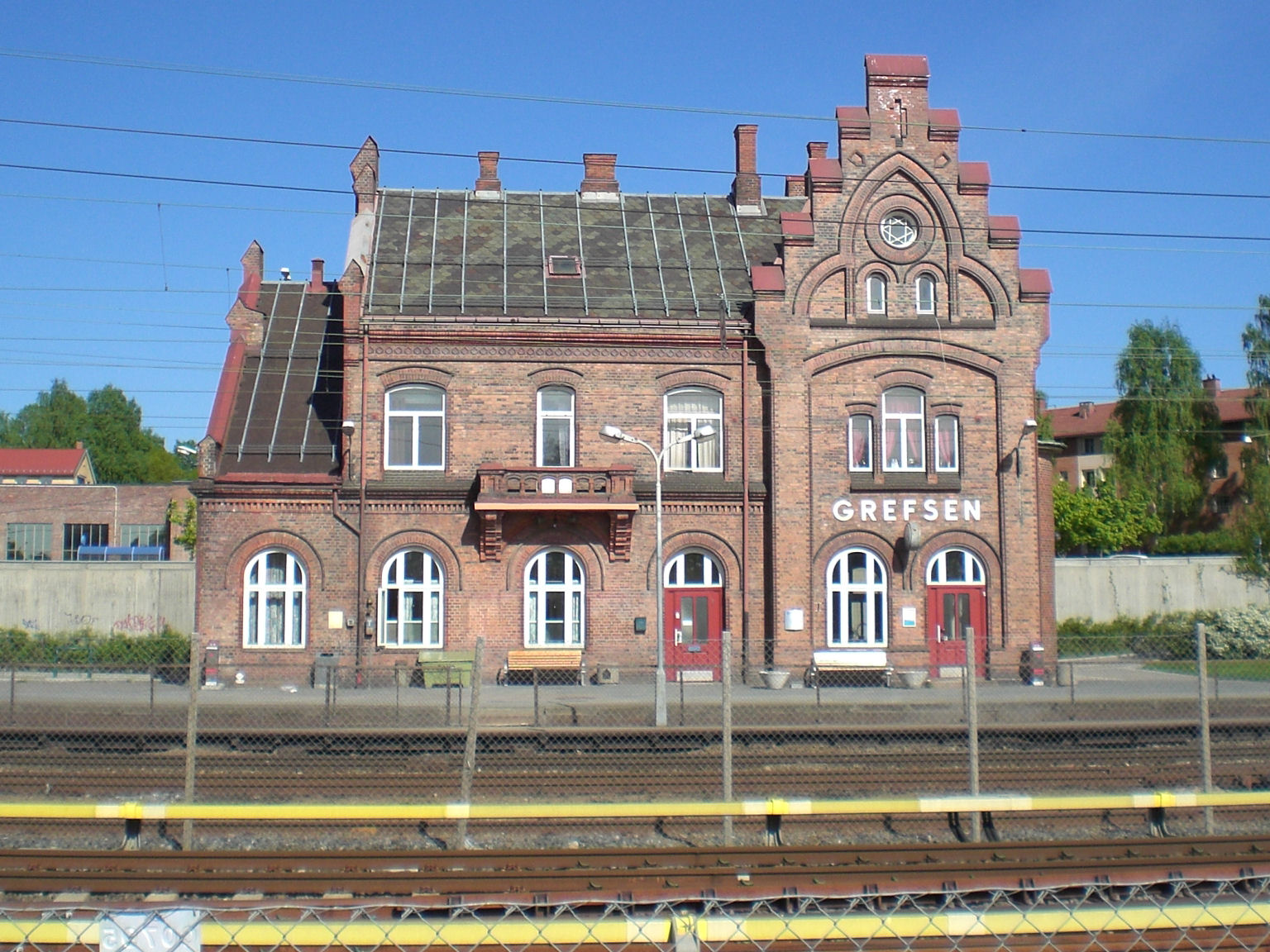

General information
- Location: Storo, Oslo; Norway
- Coordinates: 59°56′30″N 10°46′50″E
- Elevation: 109.2 m (358 ft)
- Owner: Bane NOR
- Operator: Vy Gjøvikbanen
- Lines: Gjøvik Line; Alnabru–Grefsen Line
- Distance: 6.82 km
- Platforms: 2
- Connections: Oslo Metro: Storo (station); Tram: Rikshospitalet

Construction
- Architect: Paul Due

Other information
- Station code: GRE

History
- Opened: 20 December 1900

Services
Preceding station	Trams in Oslo	Following station
Sinsenkrysset towards Rikshospitalet	Line 17	Terminus
Storo towards Rikshospitalet	Line 18	Terminus
Track layout
Location

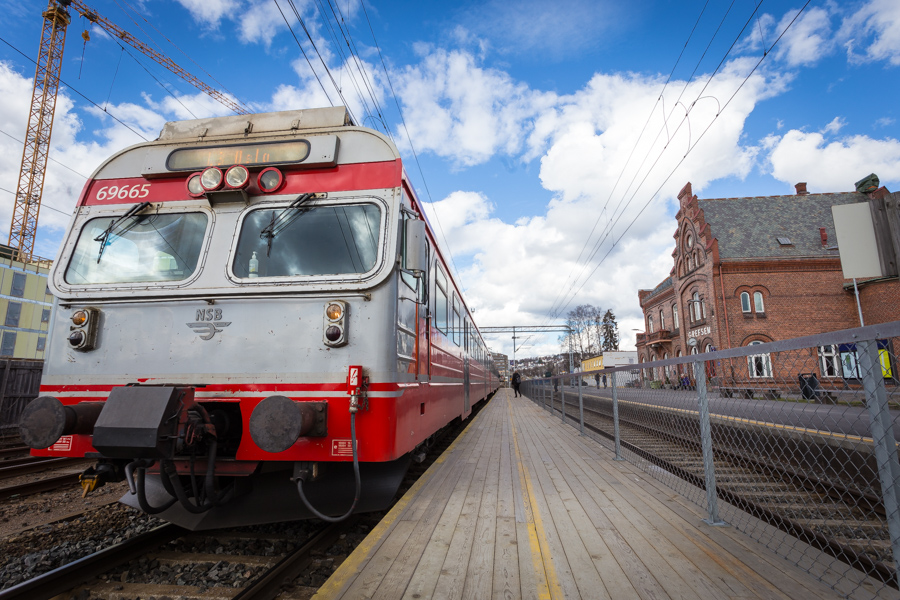
A train from Jaren has just pulled into Grefsen station. NSB Gjøvikbanen operates on the line with type 69 trains.

Grefsen station (Norwegian: Grefsen stasjon) is a railway station at Storo in Oslo, Norway on the Gjøvik Line. From the station there is also a short railway, the Alnabru–Grefsen Line, to Alna on the Hoved Line. The station is located 6.82 km from Oslo Central Station and is located between Tøyen and Nydalen at 109.2 metes above sea level. It was opened on 20 December 1900, two years before the railway to Gjøvik was finished.

The station is served by commuter and regional trains operated by Vy Gjøvikbanen. Along the line to the east runs the Ring 3 road, and across that there is a tram and bus stop. A bit further north of Grefsen Station there is a connection to the Oslo Metro, at Storo.

The station serves Nordre Åsen sports field.

== Tram Service ==
There is also a tram stop with the same name across Ring 3. It is the terminating stop of line 17 and 18. Trams change routes here, without requiring a balloon loop. Here, a tram coming in from Sinsenkrysset (on line 17) will terminate and then change to route 18 and continue straight to Storo. The tram stop is also right next to Grefsen Depot, the main depot for the Oslo Tramway network and houses the headquarters of Sporveien Trikken.

Preceding station			Following station
Tøyen	Gjøvik Line		Nydalen
Alna	Alnabru–Grefsen Line		—
Preceding station	Regional trains		Following station
Oslo S	RE30	Oslo S–Gjøvik	Nydalen
Preceding station	Local trains		Following station
Tøyen	R31	Oslo S–Jaren	Nydalen
