= Stensgata tram stop =

Tram stop in Oslo, Norway

Stensgata
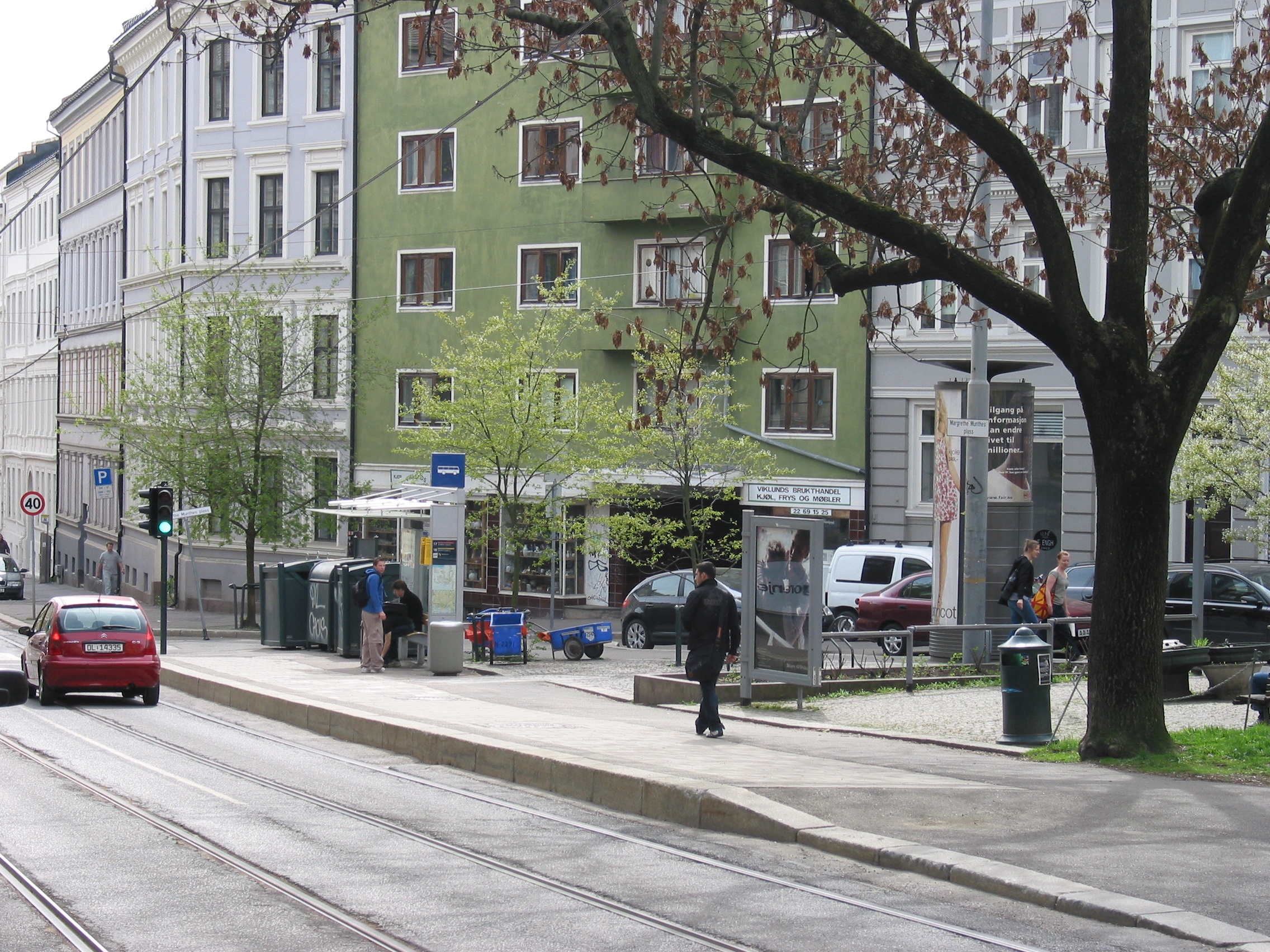

General information
- Location: Adamstuen, Oslo; Norway
- Coordinates: 59.9295721°N 10.7330327°E
- Line: Ullevål Hageby Line

History
- Opened: 1 August 1925
Location

Stensgata is a tram stop on the Ullevål Hageby Line of the Oslo Tramway. It is located in Thereses gate in between of Adamstuen and Bislett, at the intersection of Thereses gate and Stensgata. It primarily serves a residential area.

The station opened on 24 September 1909, when it became the stop before the terminus of the line, Adamstuen. It is served by line 17 and 18, using SL95 low-floor trams, giving the station step-free access to the vehicles. North of Adamstuen, the Ullevål Hageby Line is a light rail.

Preceding station	Trams in Oslo	Following station
Adamstuen towards Rikshospitalet	Line 17	Bislett towards Grefsen
Adamstuen towards Rikshospitalet	Line 18	Bislett towards Grefsen
