= Universitetet Blindern tram stop =

Tram stop in Oslo, Norway

Universitetet Blindern
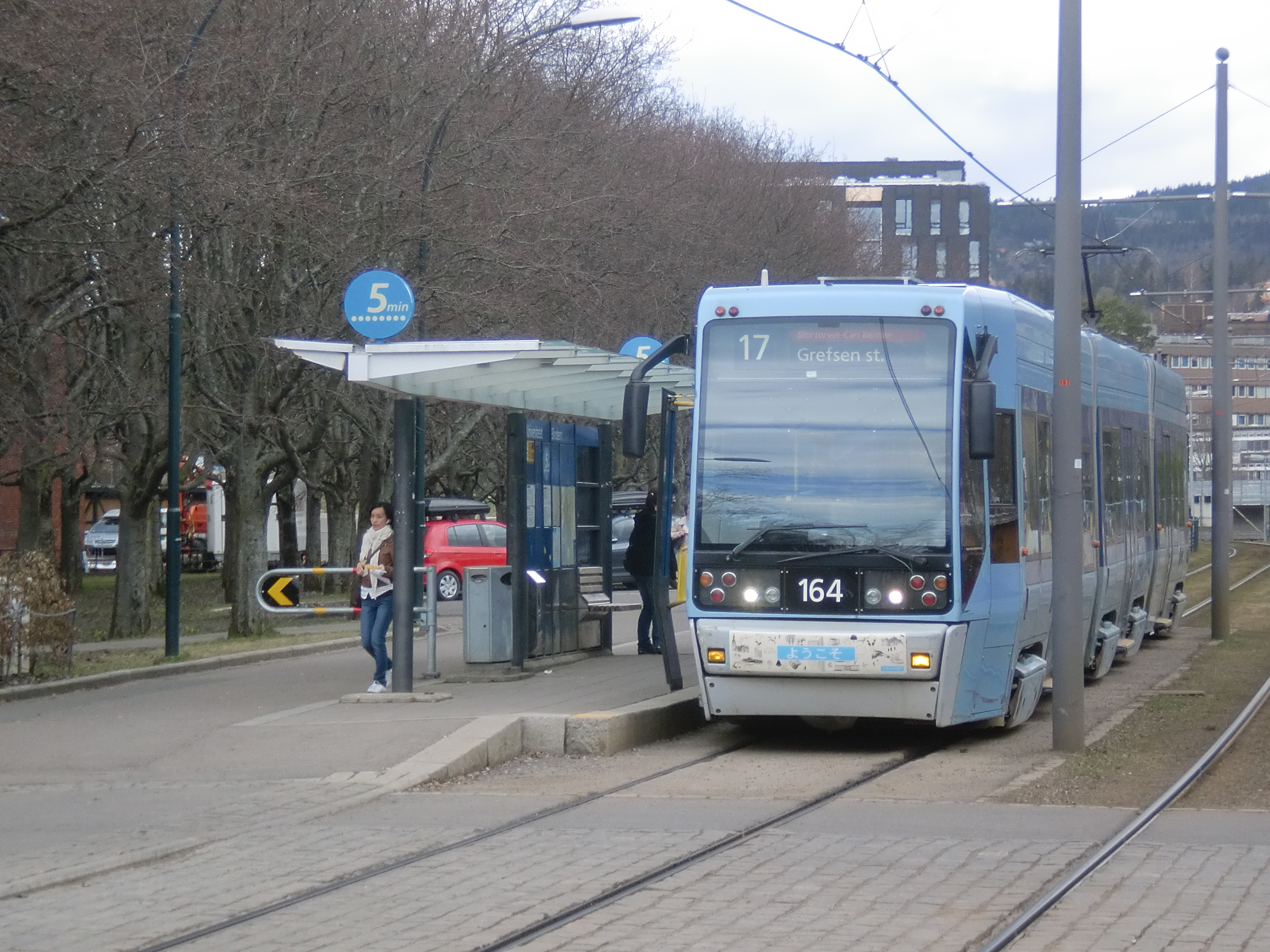

General information
- Location: Blindern, Oslo; Norway
- Coordinates: 59.9421°N 10.7243°E
- Line: Ullevål Hageby Line

History
- Opened: 1 June 1999
Location

Universitetet Blindern is a tram stop on the Ullevål Hageby Line of the Oslo Tramway. It is located on the north side of Blindern, the main campus of the University of Oslo, Norway.

The station opened on 1 June 1999 as part of the extension of the Ullevål Hageby Line to Rikshospitalet. It was formerly named Blindern nord. It is served by line 17 and 18, using SL95 low-floor trams, giving the station step-free access to the vehicles.

Preceding station	Trams in Oslo	Following station
Forskningsparken towards Rikshospitalet	Line 17	John Colletts plass towards Grefsen
Forskningsparken towards Rikshospitalet	Line 18	John Colletts plass towards Grefsen
