= Ullevål (disambiguation) =

Ullevål is a neighborhood of Oslo, Norway. It has given name to:

- Ullevål Hageby, a residential area south of Ullevål
- Ullevål Hageby Line of the Oslo Tramway
- Ullevaal Stadion, an association football venue
- Ullevål stadion (station) of the Oslo T-bane
- Ullevål IL, a local multi-sports team
- Ullevål University Hospital
- Ullevål sykehus (station) of the Oslo Tramway
