= Oslo Science City =

Research and innovation district in Oslo, Norway

Coordinates: 59°56′30″N 10°43′0″E

Oslo Science City (Norwegian: Forskningsbyen) is a research district in Oslo, Norway, traditionally centered on the Blindern and Gaustad areas in the suburban western part of the city. It was largely built in the 1950s when the University of Oslo and several technical research institutes established themselves in Blindern–Gaustad. The name Oslo Science City (Forskningsbyen) was first used by the newly established Central Institute of Industrial Research in 1949 in connection with the planned development of then-rural Gaustad. The road Forskningsveien (Science Road) was named for the district in 1955.

Today the area includes the largest campus of the University of Oslo, Oslo University Hospital, Rikshospitalet and Oslo Science Park.

An association named Oslo Science City was established in 2019. The association is controversial for insisting that the Blindern–Gaustad area should be known under an English name. The Language Council of Norway has strongly rejected the proposals to rename any areas in Blindern–Gaustad or use English names, and has pointed out that Norwegian is the main language to be used in all areas of society, as mandated by law and official government policy.
