= Adamstuen tram stop =

Tram stop in Oslo, Norway

Adamstuen
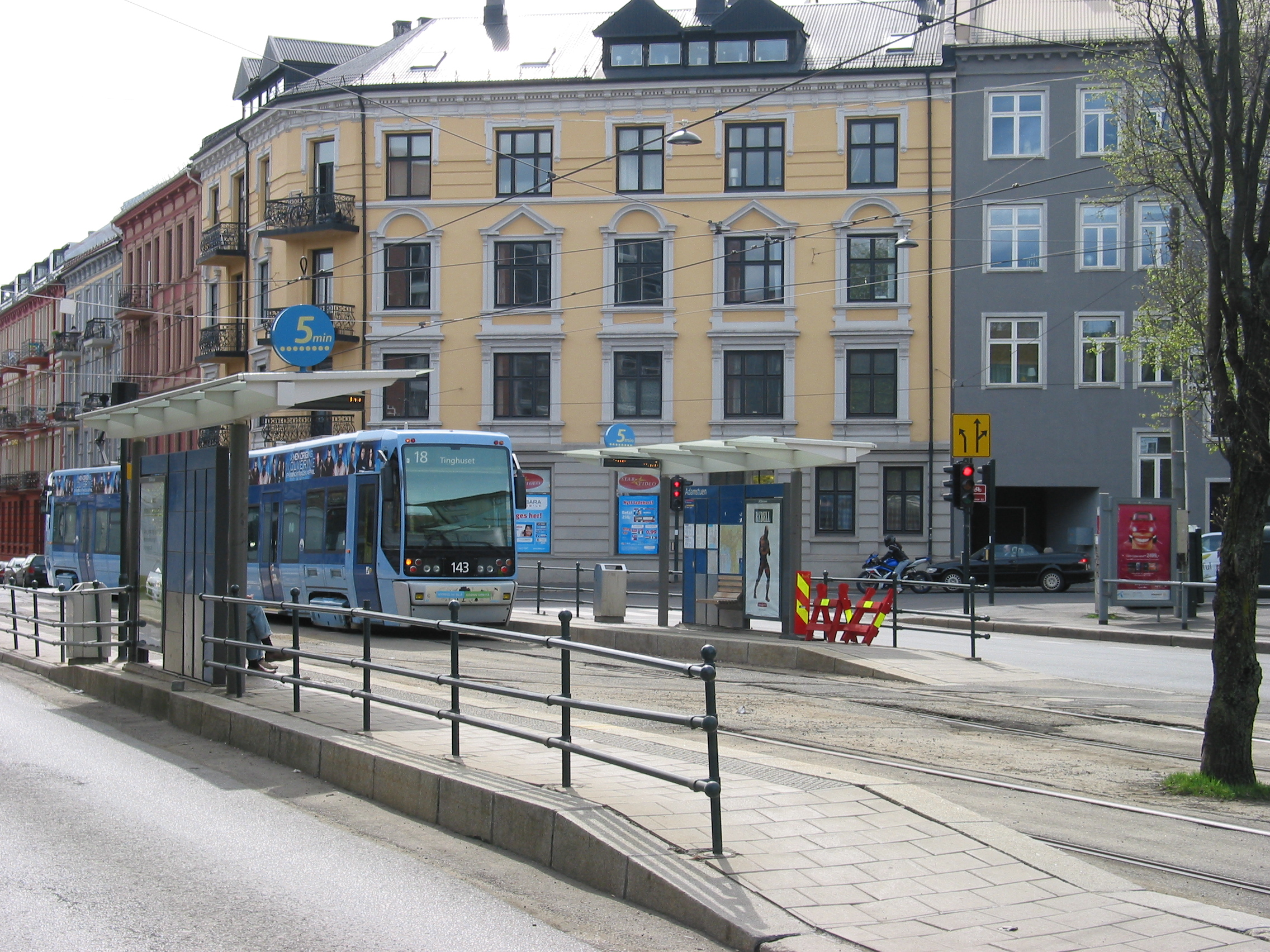

General information
- Location: Adamstuen, Oslo; Norway
- Coordinates: 59.9326°N 10.7345°E
- Line: Ullevål Hageby Line

History
- Opened: 1 August 1925
Location

Adamstuen is a tram stop on the Ullevål Hageby Line of the Oslo Tramway. It is located on the south-western side of Ullevål University Hospital, at the intersection of Sognsveien and Ullevålsveien. It primarily serves a residential area, but also the Norwegian School of Veterinary Science and Lovisenberg Hospital.

The station opened on 24 September 1909, when it became the terminus of the line. It is served by line 17 and 18, using SL95 low-floor trams, giving the station step-free access to the vehicles. North of Adamstuen, the Ullevål Hageby Line is a light rail.

Preceding station	Trams in Oslo	Following station
Ullevål sykehus towards Rikshospitalet	Line 17	Stensgata towards Grefsen
Ullevål sykehus towards Rikshospitalet	Line 18	Stensgata towards Grefsen
