= Gaustadalléen tram stop =

Tram stop in Oslo

Gaustadalléen
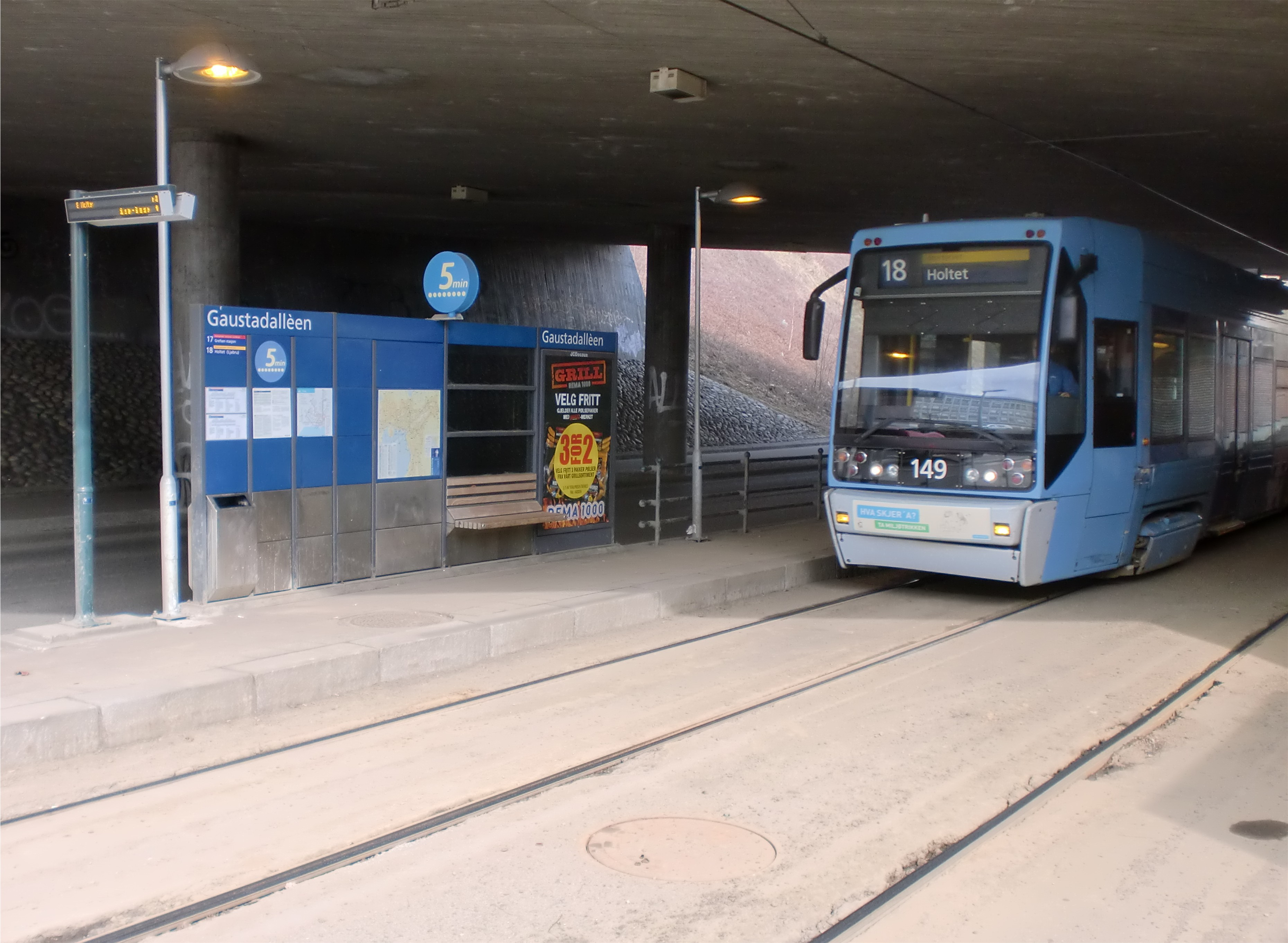

General information
- Location: Gaustad, Oslo; Norway
- Coordinates: 59.9454°N 10.7172°E
- Line: Ullevål Hageby Line

History
- Opened: 1 June 1999
Location

Gaustadalléen is a tram stop on the Ullevål Hageby Line of the Oslo Tramway. It is located where the road Gaustadalléen passes under Ring 3 in Gaustad in Oslo, Norway.

The station opened on 1 June 1999 as part of the extension of the Ullevål Hageby Line to Rikshospitalet. It is served by line 17 and 18, using SL95 low-floor trams, giving the station step-free access to the vehicles.

Preceding station	Trams in Oslo	Following station
Rikshospitalet Terminus	Line 17	Forskningsparken towards Grefsen
Rikshospitalet Terminus	Line 18	Forskningsparken towards Grefsen
