= Ullevål sykehus tram stop =

Tram stop in Oslo, Norway

Ullevål sykehus
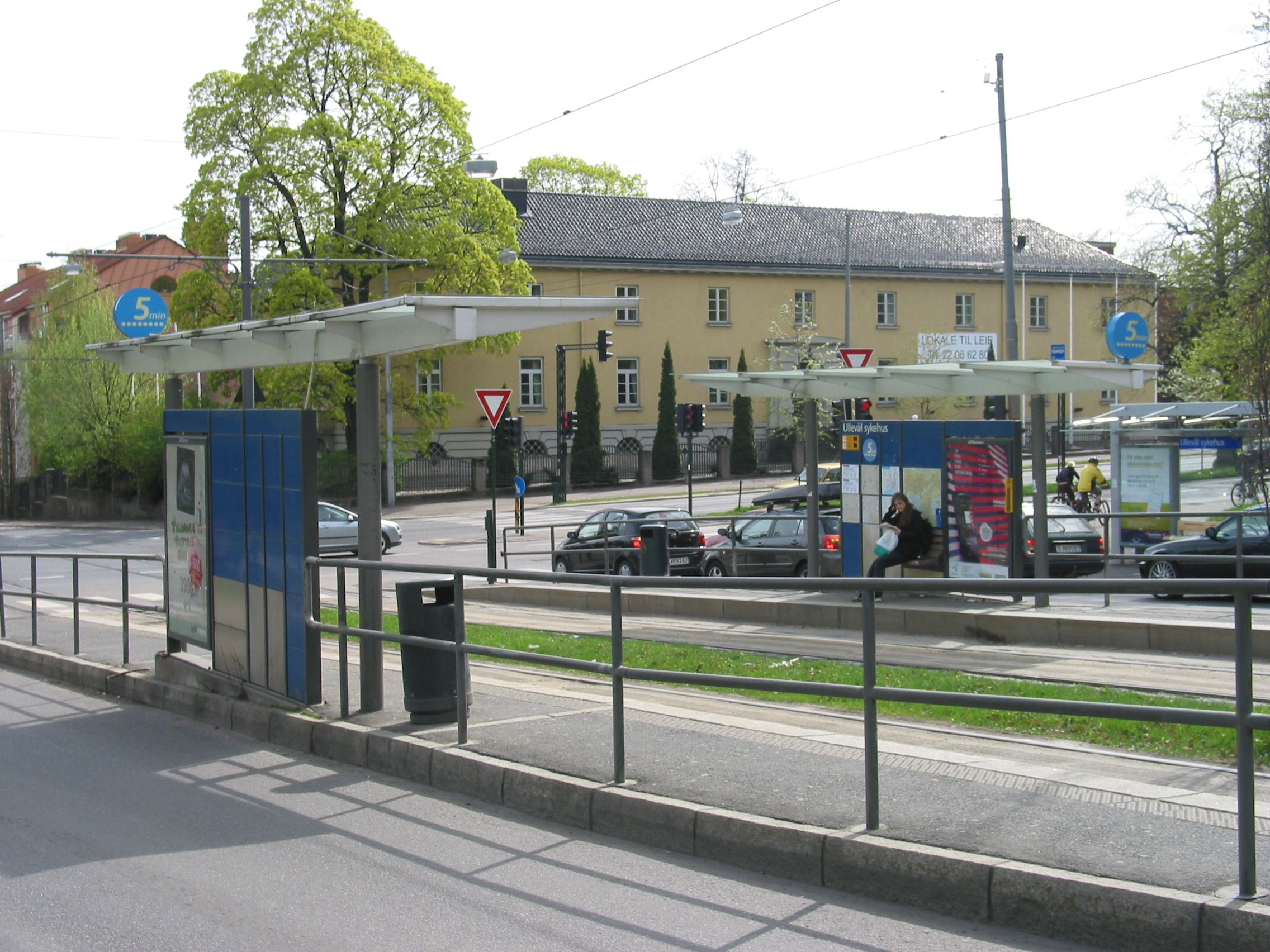

General information
- Location: Ullevål, Oslo; Norway
- Coordinates: 59.9361°N 10.7318°E
- Line: Ullevål Hageby Line

History
- Opened: 1 August 1925
Location

Ullevål sykehus is a tram stop on the Ullevål Hageby Line of the Oslo Tramway. It is located on the south-western side of Ullevål University Hospital, at the intersection of Sognsveien and Kirkeveien.

The station opened on 1 August 1925 as part of the extension of the Ullevål Hageby Line to John Colletts plass. It is served by line 17 and 18, using SL95 low-floor trams, giving the station step-free access to the vehicles. The new SL18 trams have also begun operation there, since 2022.

Preceding station	Trams in Oslo	Following station
John Colletts plass towards Rikshospitalet	Line 17	Adamstuen towards Grefsen
John Colletts plass towards Rikshospitalet	Line 18	Adamstuen towards Grefsen
