= Ullevål Hageby =

Residential area of Oslo, Norway

Coordinates: 59°56′37″N 10°44′0″E

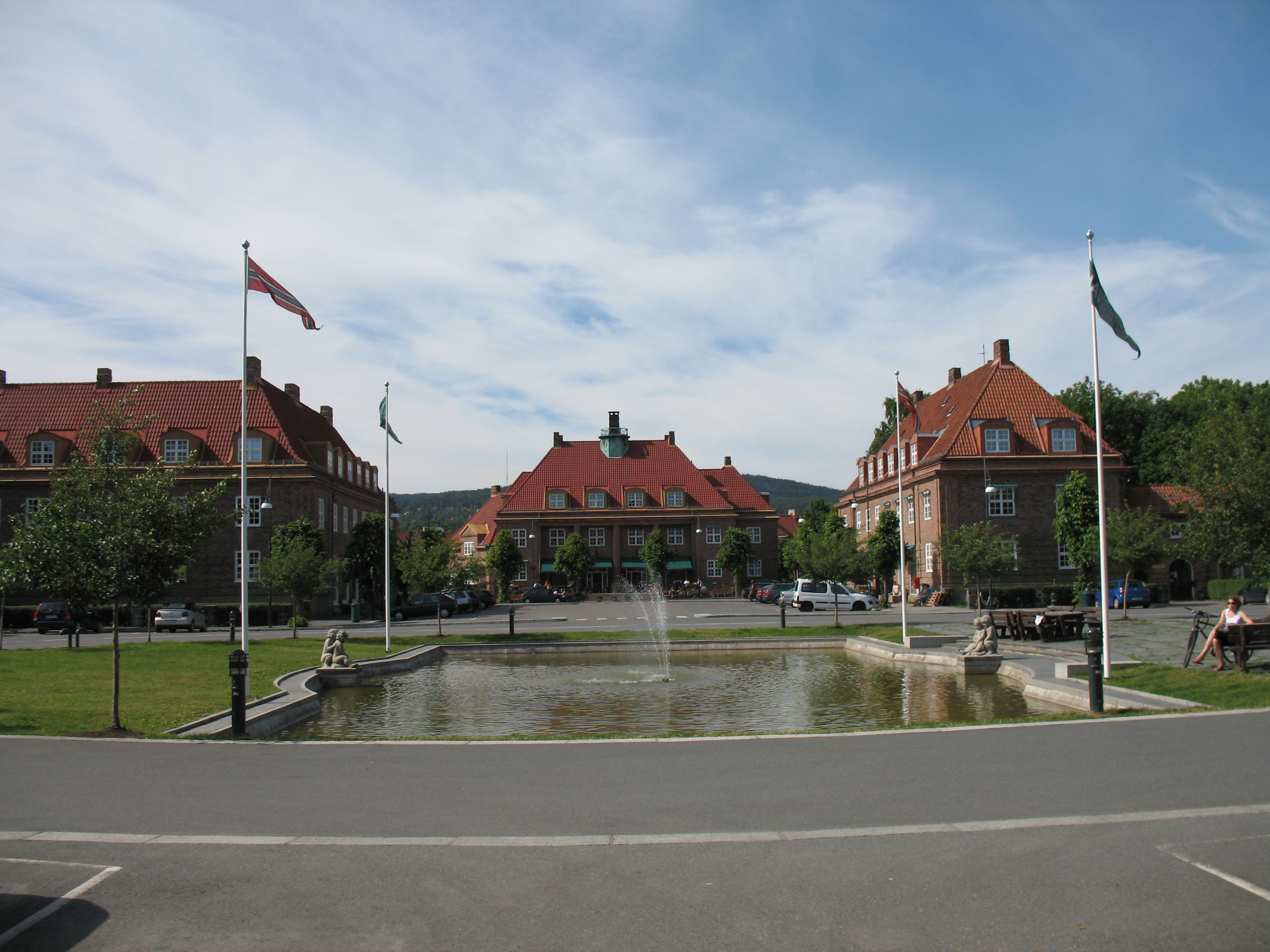

Ullevål Hageby is a residential area and garden city in borough Nordre Aker of Oslo, Norway. All housing in the area is part of the housing cooperative Oslo Havebyselskap. The area borders on Ullevål University Hospital to the east, Blindern in the west, and Berg to the north.

== History ==
The area was built between 1918 and 1926, and consists of 116 buildings with 653 apartments, making it the largest garden city in the country. It was intended for the working class, as an attempt to create healthy housing with more space, and with a small plot of garden for each house. However, when the apartments were sold, people with a middle-class background ended up as buyers, and today the area has among the highest prices in the city. The neighborhood is the setting of the 2014 Norwegian TV drama Kampen for tilværelsen.

The land originally belonged to Store Ullevål gård, bought by the City of Oslo in 1909. All buildings are made of bricks, and consists of single dwellings, row housing and duplexes.

== English garden city ==
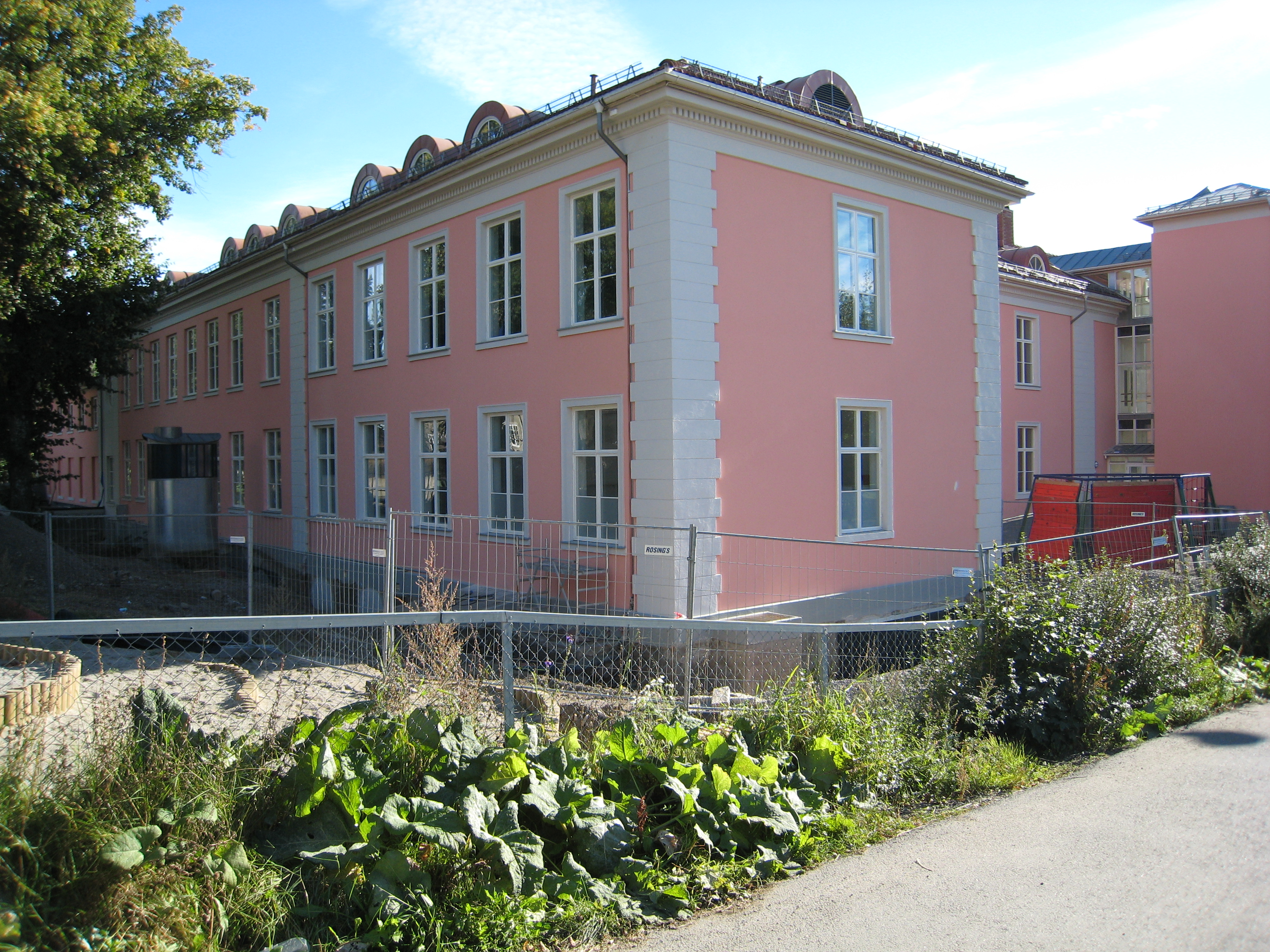
Ullevål skole

In 1913, Oscar Hoff (1875–1942) won a contest to build Ullevål Hageby, and created a residential area that was a total departure from the squared buildings of the early days of industrialism. Already in 1910, "light, air, and green trees" became the ideal, 20 years prior to functionalism's take-over of this motto. Ullevål Hageby made an indelible mark on the way houses were built thereafter.

The area is based on the Ebenezer Howard's garden city concept launched in the book Tomorrow from 1898 and Garden Cities of Tomorrow from 1902. The idea was to launch small, self-sufficient units outsite the large cities. The main architect was Oscar Hoff, supplemented by Adolf Jensen and architect and chief city planner Harald Hals. In 1925, the Ullevål Hageby Line of the Oslo Tramway was extended to John Colletts plass.

From the time Ullevål hageby was completed, the gardens have reflected changing garden ideals. Today the gardens are mainly for recreational use, while in the first years after Ullevål hageby was constructed, the cultivation of fruit and vegetables was also important.

== Tram ==
The Ullevål Hageby Line (Norwegian: Ullevål Hageby-linjen) is a light rail section of the Oslo Tramway. It runs from Stortorvet in the city center of Oslo, Norway to Rikshospitalet. It passes through the areas of St. Hanshaugen, Ullevål Hageby and Blindern before reaching Gaustad. It serves major institutions such as Oslo University College, Bislett Stadion, Ullevål University Hospital, the University of Oslo and Rikshospitalet. The line is served by route 17 and 18 by Oslo Sporvognsdrift using SL95 trams, while the tracks are owned by Kollektivtransportproduksjon.
