= John Colletts plass tram stop =

Tram stop in Oslo, Norway

John Colletts plass
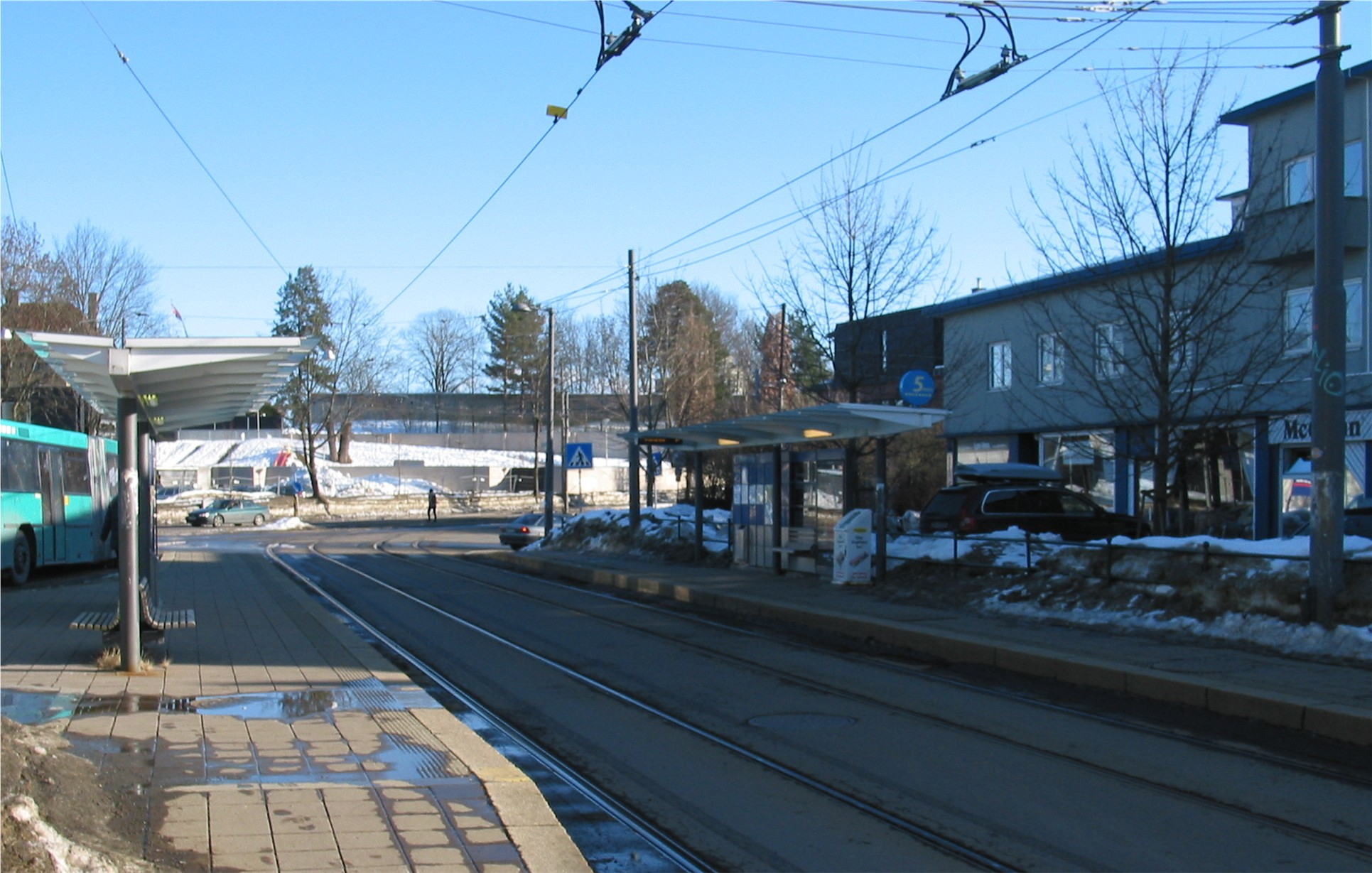
- The station platform, March 2009.

General information
- Location: Ullevål Hageby, Nordre Aker, Oslo; Norway
- Coordinates: 59.9403°N 10.7290°E
- Line: Ullevål Hageby Line

History
- Opened: 1925
Location

John Colletts plass (John Collett's Square) is a light rail tram stop on the Oslo Tramway.

Located in Ullevål Hageby in Nordre Aker borough, it was opened in 1925 as the terminus of the Ullevål Hageby Line. The name was given in 1938. In 1999, the line was extended to Rikshospitalet.

The most prominent building at the square is the former Ullevål Cinema. It was closed as a cinema in 1964, but is now used for lectures at the University of Oslo. The university campus is located a few hundred metres west of John Colletts plass.

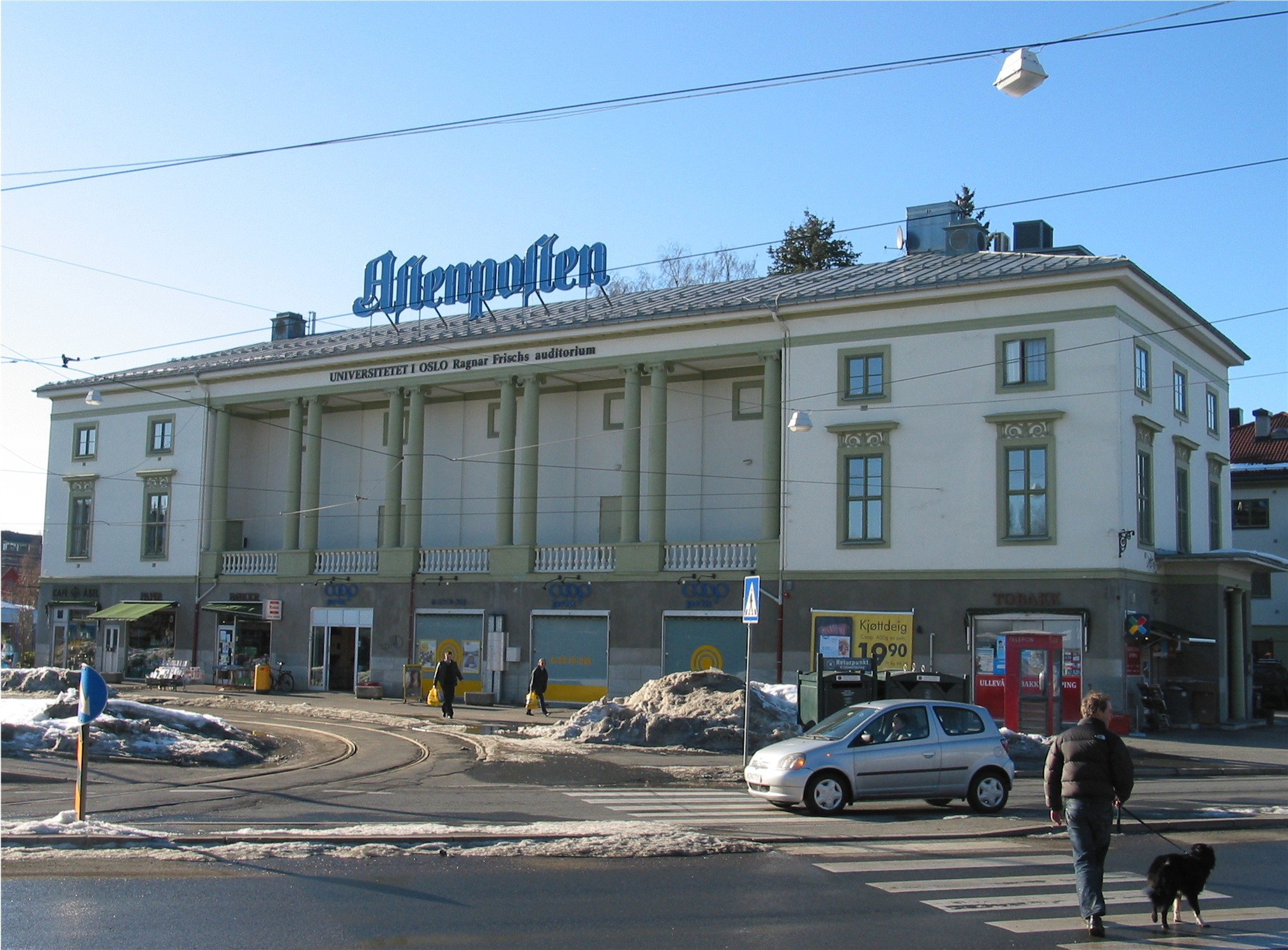
Ullevål Cinema; the balloon loop is visible to the left.

Preceding station	Trams in Oslo	Following station
Universitetet Blindern towards Rikshospitalet	Line 17	Ullevål sykehus towards Grefsen
Universitetet Blindern towards Rikshospitalet	Line 18	Ullevål sykehus towards Grefsen
