= Halvor Blinderen =

Norwegian farmer (1733–1804)

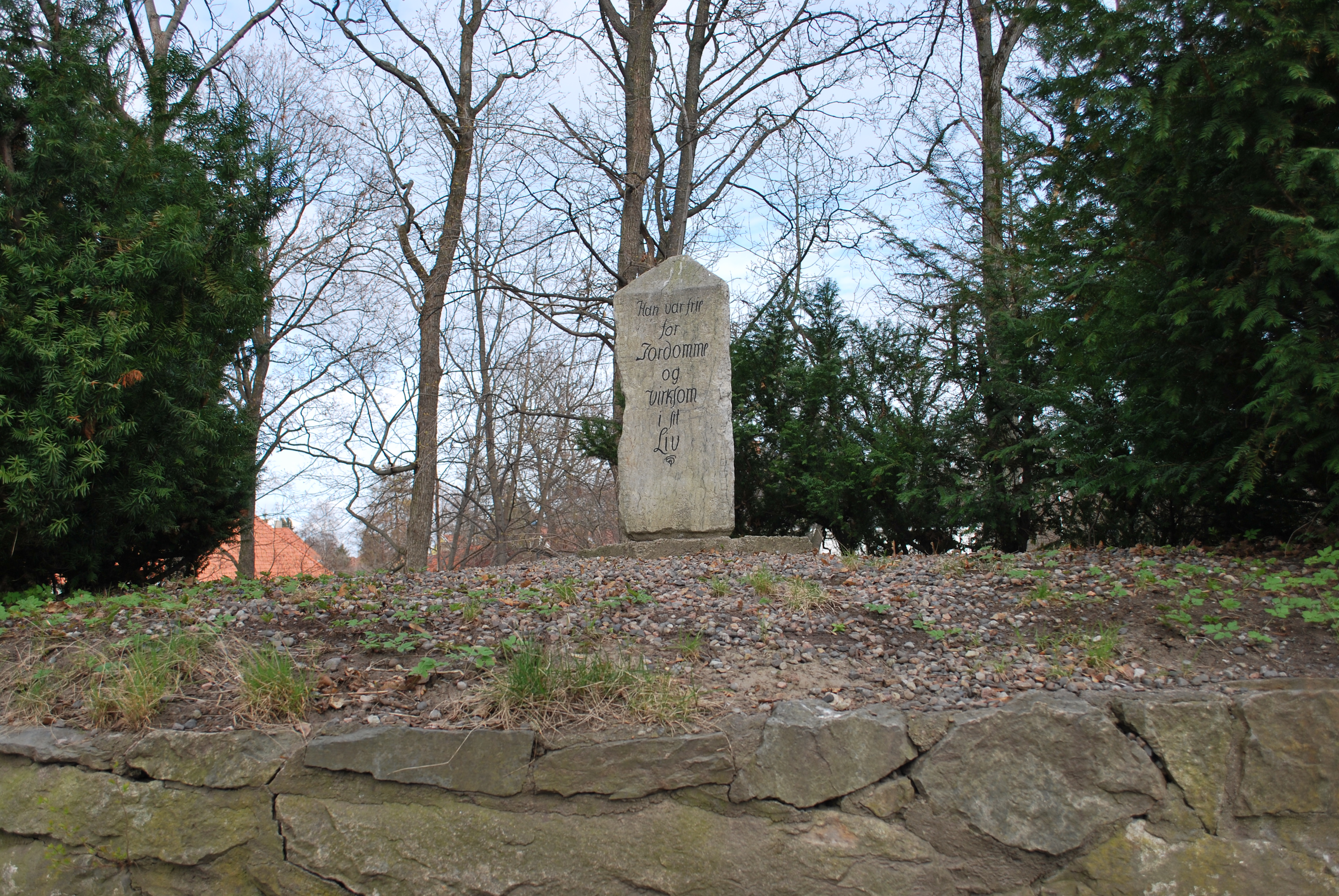
Halvor Blinderen tombstone at Nedre Blindern

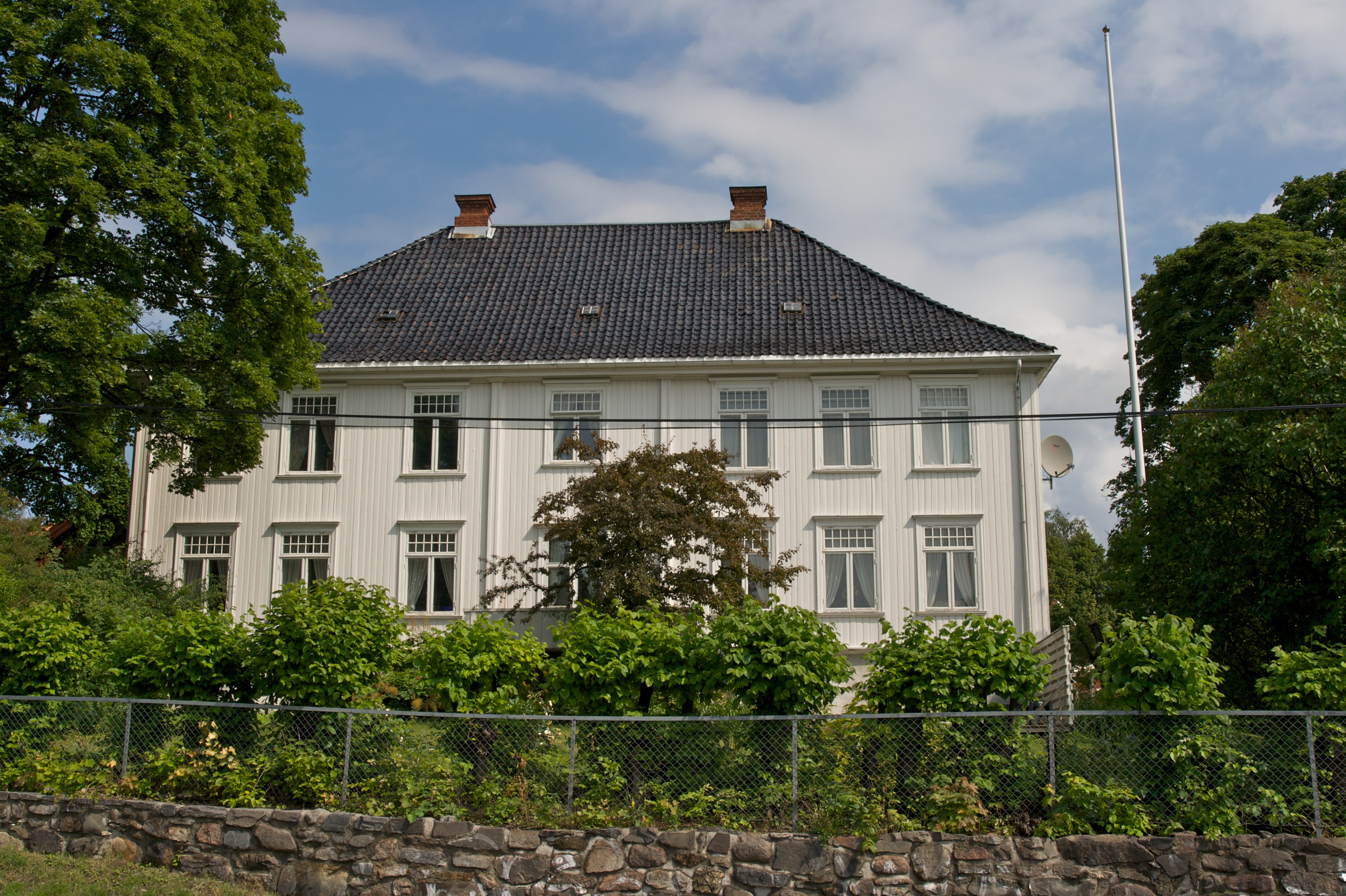
Main Building at Nedre Blindern

Halvor Blinderen (16 June 1733 – 29 June 1804) was a Norwegian farmer noted for his progressive cultivation of plants.

Halvor Haagensen Blinderen was born at Aker in Akershus at the family farm Nedre Blindern gård. Blindern developed the farm as a model for new operating methods of agriculture. He experimented with different crops and fruit cultivation He experimented with apricot, cherry trees and garden vegetables as well as beekeeping. He is most associated with his production of large quantities of potatoes.

The square Halvor Blinderns plass in Oslo is named after him, and a marble bust of him was erected on Blindernveien in St. Hanshaugen in Oslo. The Main Building at Nedre Blindern has served as a rectory since 1856 and from 2000 the residence of the Bishop of Oslo.

== See also ==
- Blindern
