= Adamstuen =

Neighborhood in Oslo, Norway

Coordinates: 59.93°N 10.73°E

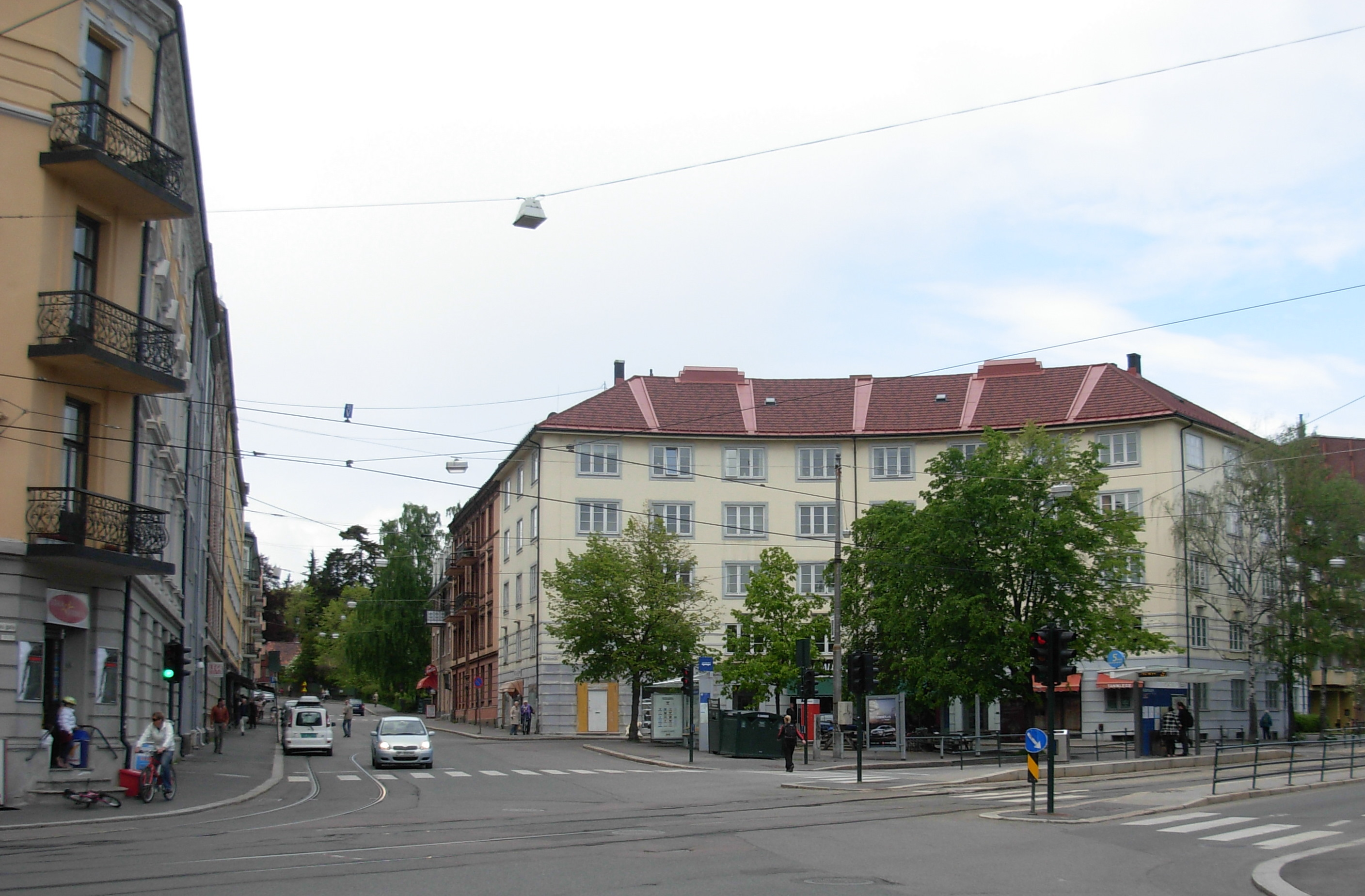
The intersection between Ullevålsveien, Theresesgate and Sognsveien

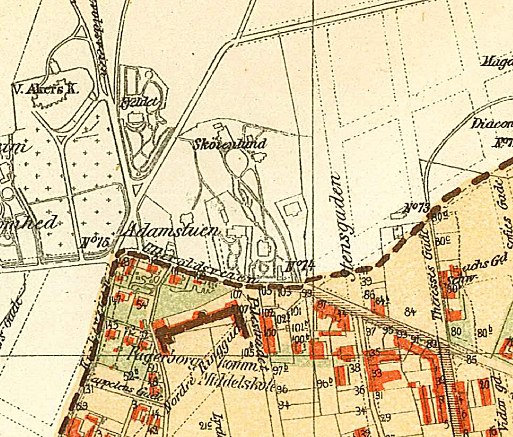
Map from 1917

Adamstuen is a neighborhood in the borough of St. Hanshaugen in Oslo, Norway. It is located south of Ullevål University Hospital. It is served by Adamstuen stop of the Oslo Tramway.

The neighborhood's name comes from Adam R. Steen (d. 1807), a storekeeper who owned the property, combined with the Norwegian stue, 'cabin, house with one single room', inflected in definite form. A similar etymology is evident in the name of the Majorstuen neighborhood.

The September 2009 issue of Monocle featured an article on Thereses gate, a street running through the heart of the neighborhood, noting its "small-town feel".
