= Ullevål Hageby Line =

Tram line in Oslo, Norway

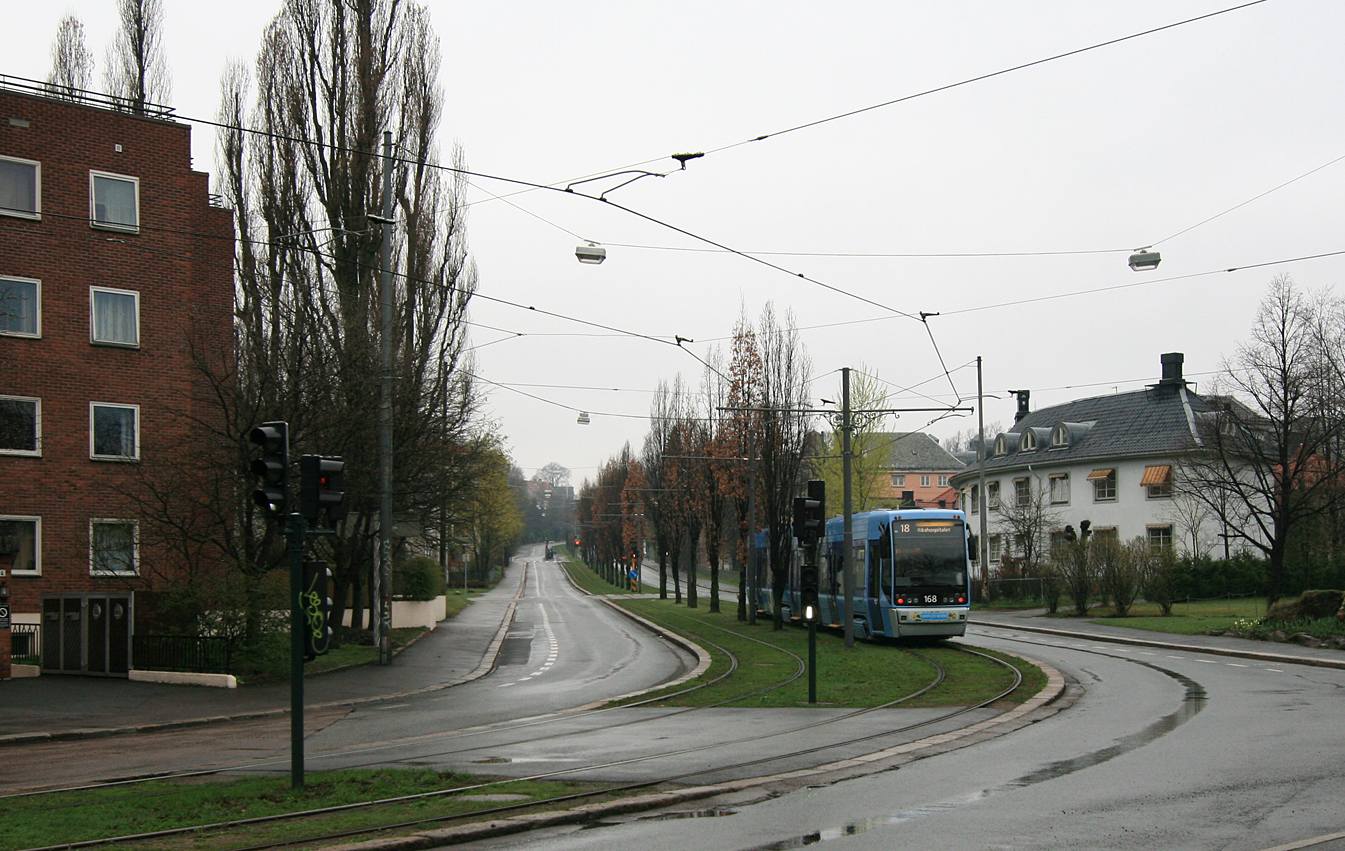

Overview
- Native name: Ullevål hageby-linjen
- Owner: Kollektivtransportproduksjon
- Locale: Oslo, Norway
- Termini: Stortorvet; Rikshospitalet

Service
- Type: Tramway
- System: Oslo Tramway
- Operator(s): Oslo Sporvognsdrift
- Rolling stock: SL95

History
- Opened: 6 October 1875

Technical
- Number of tracks: Double
- Track gauge: 1,435 mm (4 ft 8 1/2 in)
- Electrification: 750 V DC
- Operating speed: 50 kilometres per hour (31 mph)

The Ullevål Hageby Line (Norwegian: Ullevål Hageby-linjen) is a light rail section of the Oslo Tramway. It runs from Stortorvet in the city center of Oslo, Norway to Rikshospitalet. It passes through the areas of St. Hanshaugen, Ullevål Hageby and Blindern before reaching Gaustad. It serves major institutions such as Oslo University College, Bislett Stadion, Ullevål University Hospital, the University of Oslo and Rikshospitalet. The line is served by route 17 and 18 by Oslo Sporvognsdrift using SL95 trams, while the tracks are owned by Kollektivtransportproduksjon.

The first section, from Stortorvet from Homansbyen, opened in 1875 as a horsecar line. It was electrified in 1900, and extended to Adamstuen in 1909. In 1925, the line reached Ullevål Hageby. The final extension to Rikshospitalet was opened in 1999, following the move of the hospital. The last section is formally called the Gaustad Line (Gaustadlinjen). North of Adamstuen, the line runs in its own right-of-way, mostly in the center of streets; southwards, it is a street tramway. Transfers to the Oslo T-bane are possible at Forskningsparken and Tinghuset/Professor Aschehougs gate.

== History ==
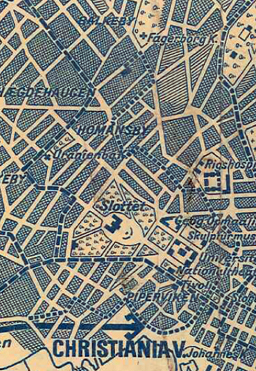
Map of Vestbanen–Homansbyen, ca. 1900

The first section of the Ullevål Hageby Line, from Stortorvet to Homansbyen, was built by Kristiania Sporveisselskab and opened on 6 October 1875 as a horsecar line. A depot was built at Homansbyen. The line was part of the first system in the city, and connected to the Gamleby Line on the other side of Stortorvet. Until 19 October there were also some direct services to the Western Railway Station (Vestbanen). The first services had fifteen-minute headway—increasing to ten minutes from 22 June 1876. There were also some trials of using sleds during winter.

The line was electrified on 15 January 1900. On 24 September 1909, it was extended from Homansbyen to Adamstuen. In 1924, the line, along with the rest of the street tram network, was taken over by the municipal Oslo Sporveier. On 1 August 1925, the line was extended to Ullevål Hageby (later renamed John Colletts plass).

=== Rikshospitalet extension ===
In 1988, the Norwegian Parliament decided to start the process of moving Rikshospitalet, the National Hospital, from Pilestredet to Gaustad. Following the completion of the architectural plans in 1991, the city planner launched the concept for transport to the new hospital. 50% of the transport was to be by public transport, up from the contemporary 35%, and would require an extension of the Ullevål Hageby Line to the hospital. Specific plans for the extension were launched in April 1992, and were estimated to cost 100 million kr.

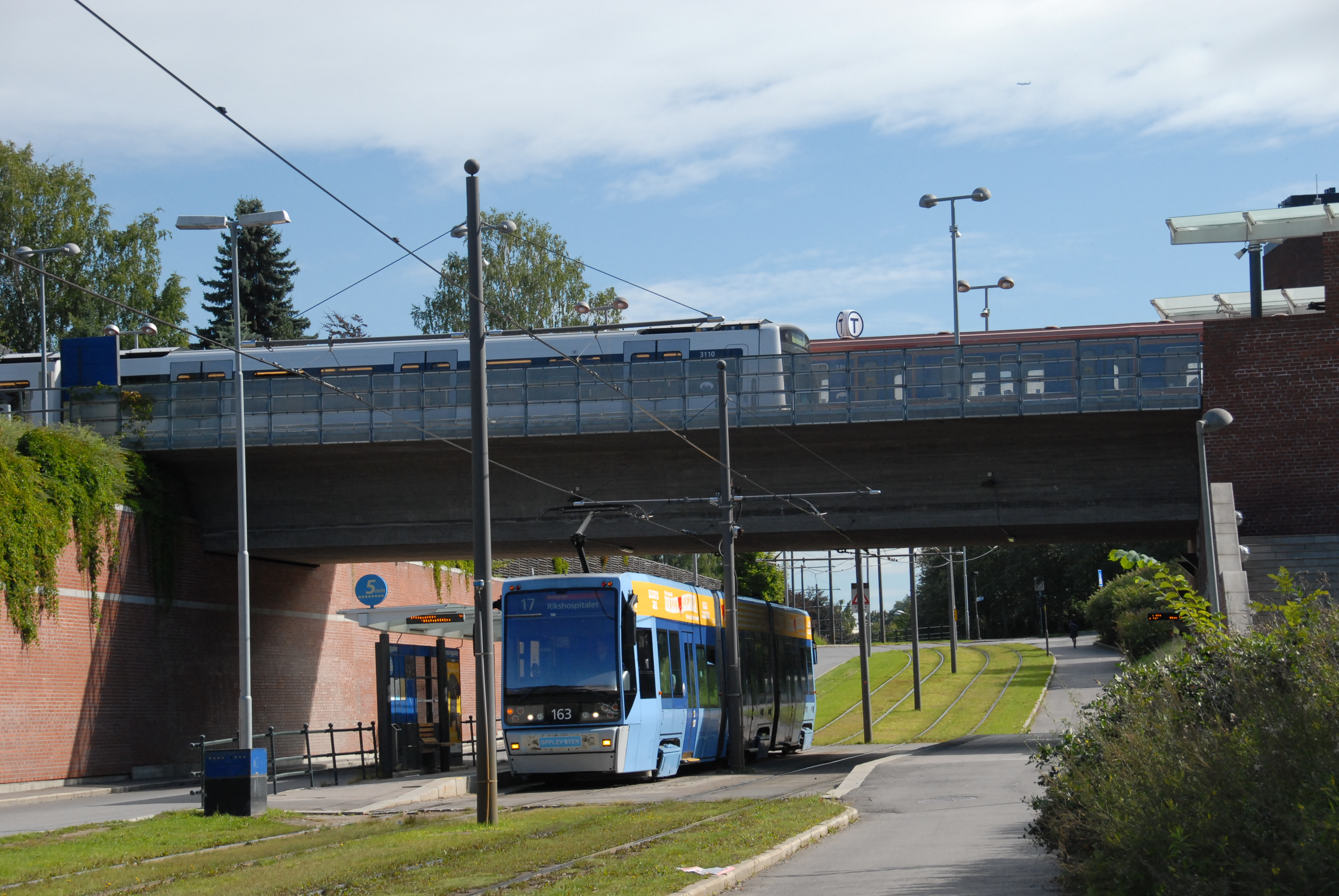
Forskningsparken

The regulation plan for the hospital, and the go-ahead for the construction of the line, was passed by the city council on 4 May 1994. In April 1996, a disagreement between the municipality and the Ministry of Transport arose concerning who should be paying for the extension. The state had at the time formally suggested that the bill be split 50–50 between the two, whereas the municipality claimed that the state had promised to pay for the full extension. In June, the Conservative Party, Labour Party and Progress Party in the city council all voted against municipal grants for the line. The politicians signalled that they instead wanted to look at possibilities of serving the hospital with rapid transit and bus. Also the university was opposed to the plans, since the line would split the university campus up, would require trees along an avenue to be removed and would force parking places to be moved. The city council voted against building the line on 24 September 1997, with the majority arguing that the hospital could be served by the nearby Gaustad Station on the Holmenkoll Line and by buses. Three opposition parties, the Labour Party, Socialist Left Party and Red Electoral Alliance, voted in favor of the tram line.

On 6 February 1998, an agreement was made between the ministry and the city, where the city would fund NOK 31 of 111 million of the investment needed. However, the city would have to pay all budget overrides. In 1996, the work with Oslo Package 2 started. A follow-up on the existing road investment plan Oslo Package 1, it would allow toll fees to be used to finance public transport infrastructure in Oslo. While the line was not initially part of the package, it served as a prelude in combining state and municipal grants to public transport investments. The agreement was approved by parliament on 26 May 1998.

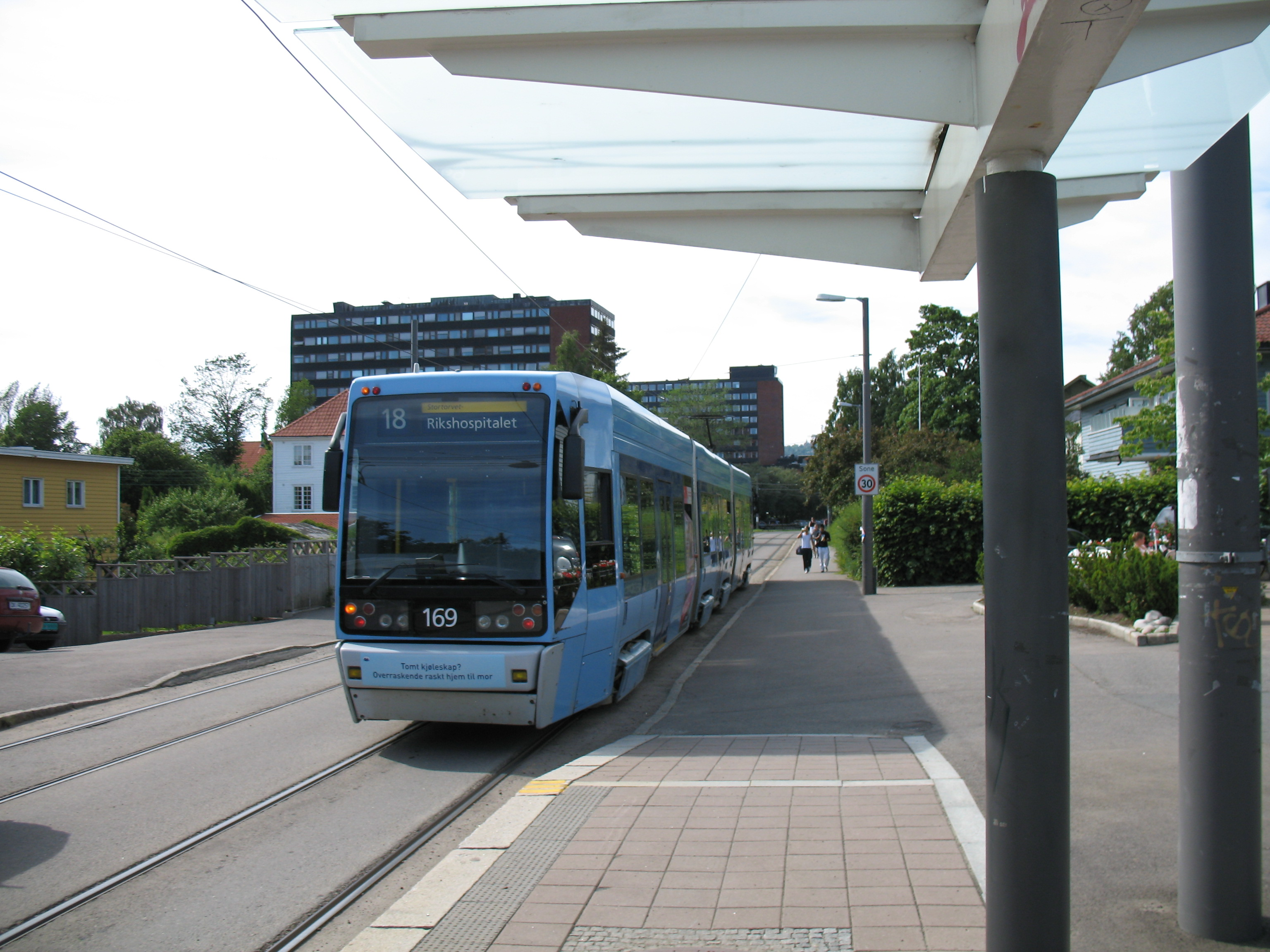
John Colletts plass

The 1.6 kilometres (0.99 mi) extension was ready for trial runs on 25 May 1999, when a new SL95 tram made a tested. Only the newest tram series can operate on the line, since all the older tram types were only unidirectional. Normal operations started on 1 June. After one month, ridership had increased with 20%, and 99% of services were less than three minutes delayed. The expansion had four new stations: Universitetet Blindern, Forskningsparken, Gaustadalléen and Rikshospitalet. The entire section is built as a light rail, with step-free access to the trams, and the trams having their own corridors in the middle of the road. The last station on the old section, John Colletts plass, had to be moved, though the balloon loop has been kept. On 22 August, the T-bane station Vestgrensa was closed, and replaced by one at Forskningsparken. This allows direct transfer from the Sognsvann Line (and since 2003 the Ring Line) of the T-bane to the Ullevål Hageby Line.

An original intent was to let the line continue from Rikshospitalet, connect with the Holmenkoll Line at Gaustad, follow its tracks southwards before branching off near Frøen and ending at Majorstuen. Here, at the terminus of the Frogner and Briskeby Lines, a reconnection with the tramway system was provided. No part of this plan materialized.

The line was the crime scene of a murder on 3 August 2004, when a mentally deranged man went on a stabbing spree on board a tram at Bislett, injuring five and killing one.

== Service ==
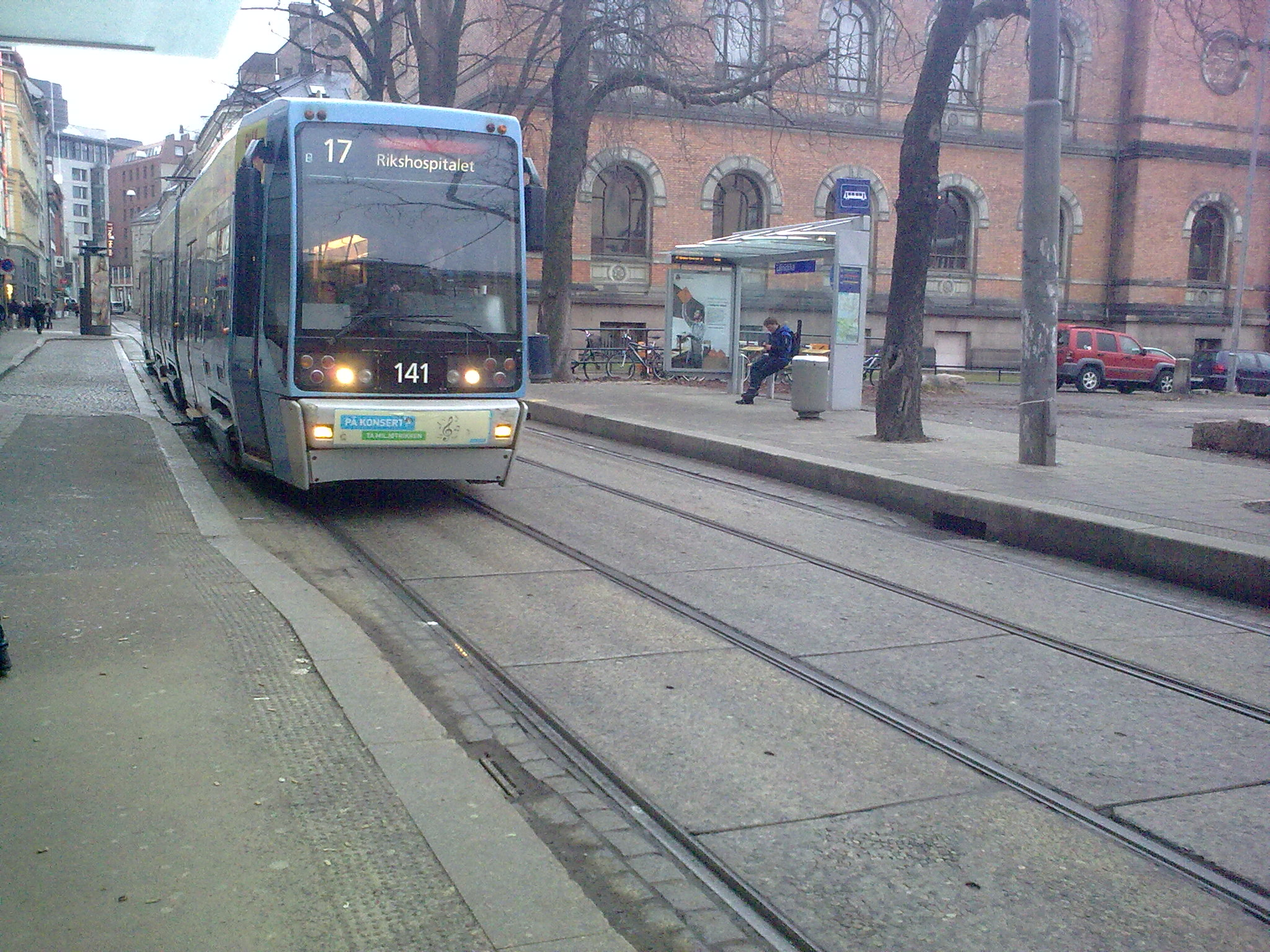
Tullinløkka

The Ullevål Hageby Line is served by lines 17 and 18 of the Oslo Tramway. Both lines operate the full length of the line between Rikshospitalet and Stortorvet and continue to Grefsen, but by different routes. Line 17 continues along the Sinsen Line while line 18 continues along the Grünerløkka–Torshov Line. Because there is no turning loop, only SL95 low-floor trams are used. Each line operates on a ten-minute headway during the day, and a twenty-minute headway in the evening and in the weekends. During the peak hours, the line therefore is served every five minutes. The service is provided by Oslo Sporvognsdrift, on contract with Ruter. The trams and tracks are owned by the municipal company Kollektivtransportproduksjon.

Transfers to lines 3, 4 and 5 of the T-bane are possible at Forskningsparken, while all T-bane lines can be reached at Tinghuset/Professor Aschehougs plass. Line 11 of the tramway can be transferred to at Welhavens gate and Høyskolesenteret. All other trams lines can be transferred to at Stortorvet. Line 18 also continues along the Gamleby Line to Jernbanetorget, and line 17 to Kirkeristen, where transfer is possible to the T-bane, and the national rail network at Oslo Central Station.

From downtown, the line runs in a generally northern direction, gradually turning northwestwards, moving along Thereses gate and Sognsveien to John Colletts plass, then through Niels Henrik Abels vei, on the north side of the University of Oslo campus, before ending at Rikshospitalet. The leg between John Colletts plass and Rikshospitalet is formally called the Gaustad Line (Gaustadlinjen). The first part of the line, from Stortorvet to Welhavens gate, serves the city center. Welhavens gate (east-bound trams) and Høyskolesenteret (west-bound trams) serves the main campus of Oslo University College. Bislett is located just outside the multi-purpose sports venue Bislett Stadion. Ullevål sykehus serves Ullevål University Hospital, while both Universitet Blindern and Forskningsparken serve the main campus of the University of Oslo at Blindern. Rikshospitalet serves the hospital it takes its name from.
