= Gaustad =

Neighborhood in Oslo, Norway

Coordinates: 59.94°N 10.71°E

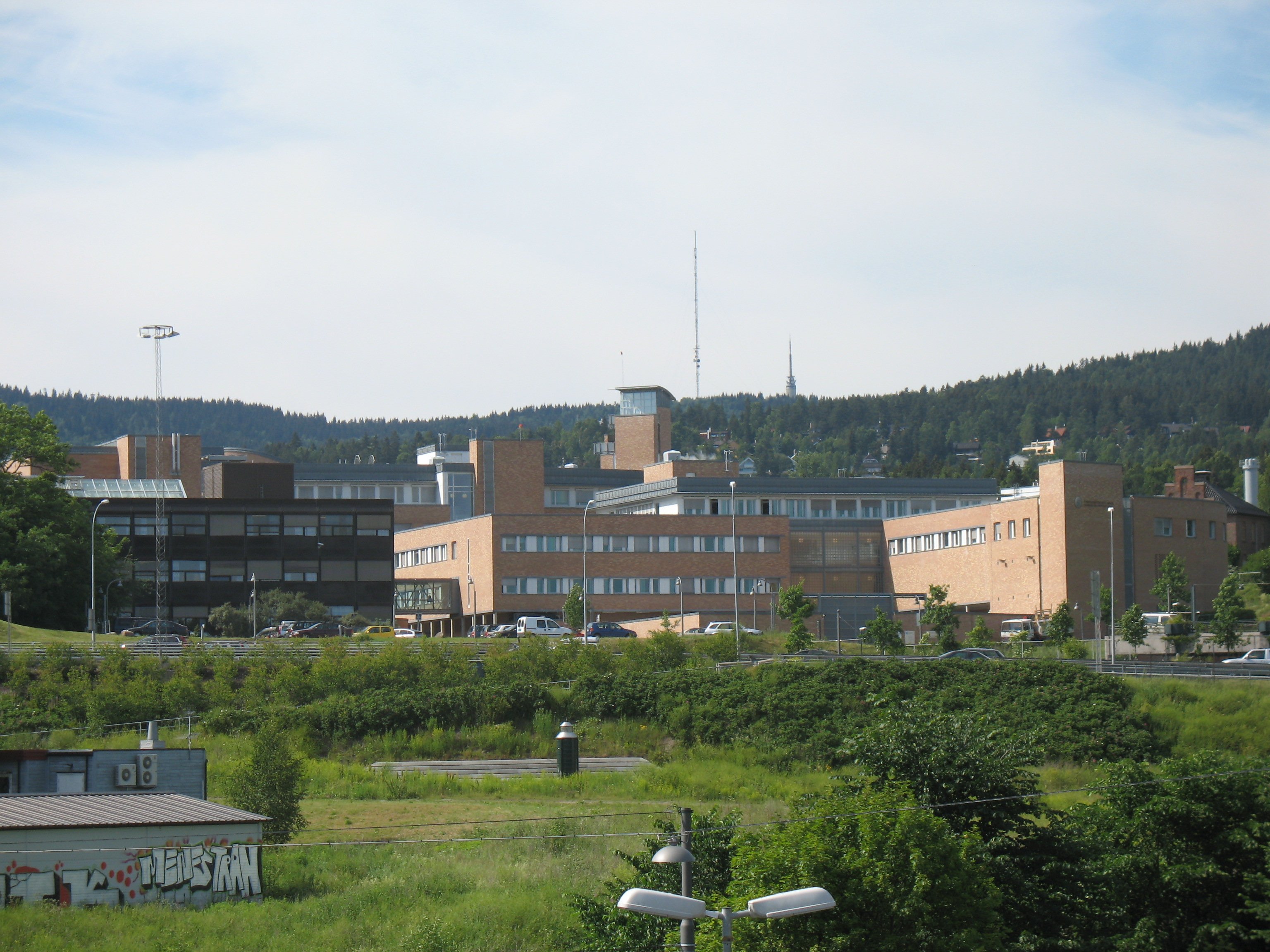
Rikshospitalet occupies a large area of Gaustad

Gaustad is a neighborhood in Nordre Aker borough of Oslo, Norway. It is located between Vinderen and Kringsjå. At Gaustad, are The National Hospital and Gaustad Hospital, as well as residential areas that border to Nordmarka.

The area is served by Rikshospitalet Station on the Ullevål Hageby Line of Oslo Tramway, and Gaustad Station on the Holmenkoll Line of Oslo T-bane. Ring 3 runs through the neighborhood.
