= Blindern =

Main campus of the University of Oslo, Norway

Coordinates: 59°56′N 10°43′E

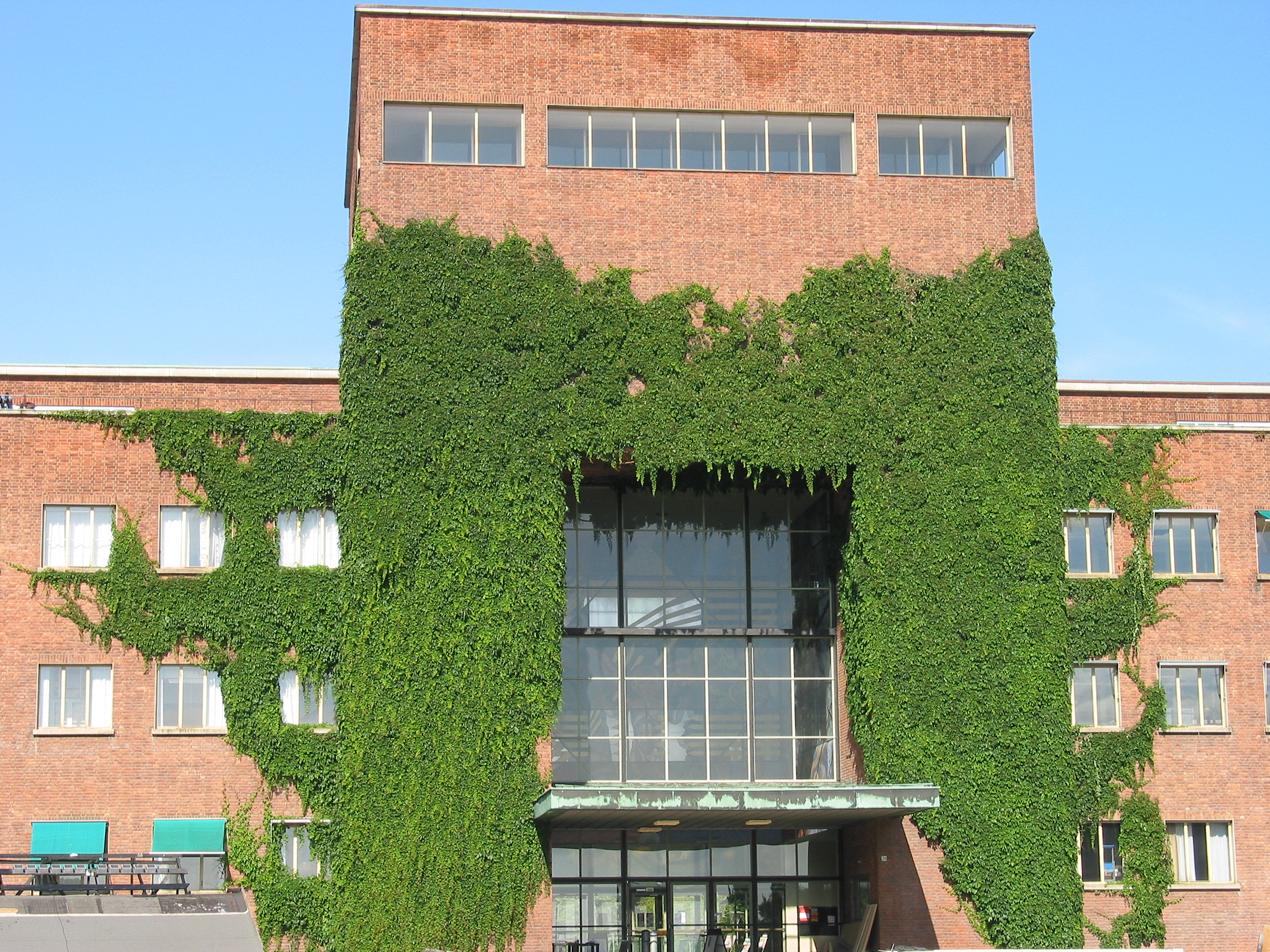
Department of Physics, the second building to be erected on the university campus University of Oslo, Blindern.

Blindern is the main campus of the University of Oslo, located in Nordre Aker in Oslo, Norway.

== Campus ==
Most of the departments of the University of Oslo are located at Blindern; other, smaller campuses include Sentrum (law), Gaustad (medicine), St. Hanshaugen (odontology) and Tøyen (botany, zoology, geology and paleontology).

The central building is the new university library, Georg Sverdrup's house. Other buildings of note are Eilert Sundt's house, the social studies building; the humanities buildings, named after Sophus Bugge, Henrik Wergeland, Niels Treschow and P. A. Munch; Frederikke, the welfare building; and Niels Henrik Abel's house, for mathematical studies, the biology building, named after Kristine Bonnevie, the first female professor at Oslo University.

Though the construction of a university campus at Blindern was decided on as early as 1921, the first buildings were not ready for use before 1931. Only in 1960 was Upper Blindern, the area most associate with the university today, finished. UiO today has approximately 32,000 students.

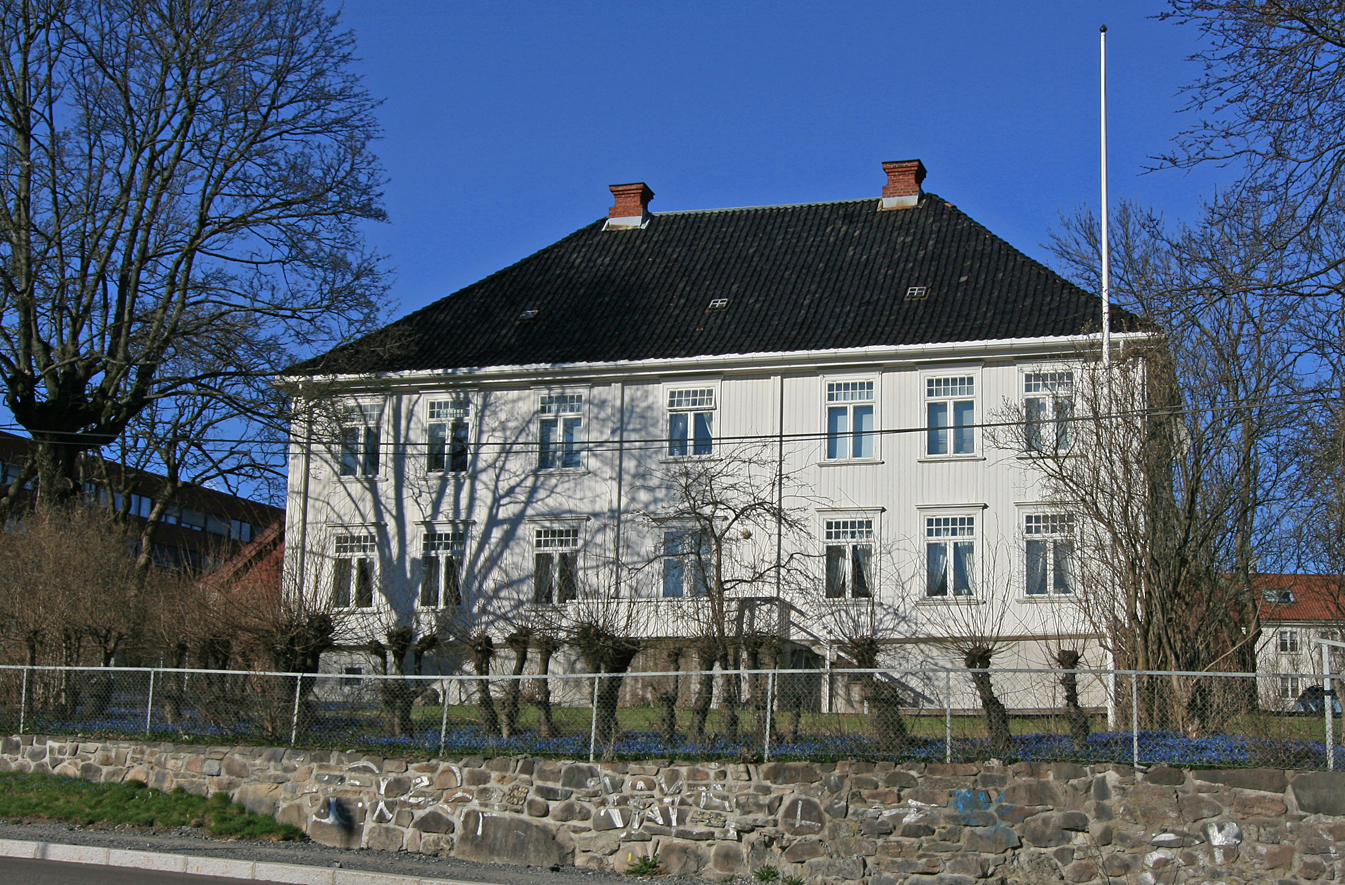
Rectory for Vestre Aker parish, built between 1790 and 1800

== Etymology ==
The campus is named after the old farm Blindern from Norse Blindarvin. The first element is probably the genitive of an old name of the brook, Blindernbekken (Blind), the last element is vin f 'meadow'. The word Blind is derived from the fact that parts of the brook were hidden to see since the brook had a deep course.

== History ==
Blindern was ancient farmland. In the 18th and 19th century the owners were among the progressive farmers who employed modern methods of agriculture, sold refrigerated milk to the city. Halvor Blinderen (1733–1804) was a pioneering farm owner and was among the first farmer to grow potatoes in Norway.

In the 1850s parts of the Blindern farm were made the vicarage of Vestre Aker parish. Among the parsons was poet and folklorist Jørgen Moe, who is buried at the churchyard (Vestre Aker kirkegård).
