= SL95 =

Articulated tramcar class in Oslo, Norway

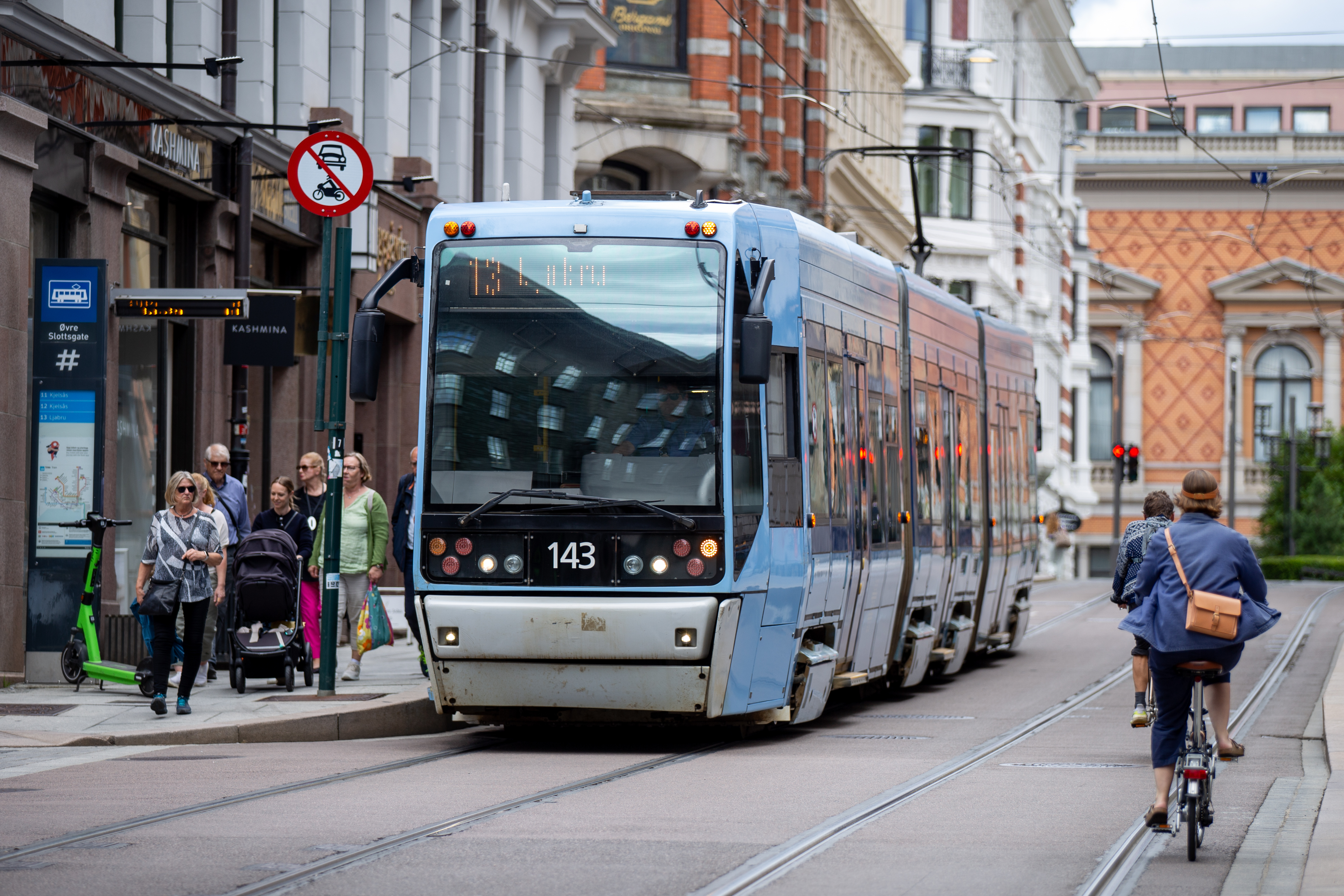
- In service: 1999–2025
- Manufacturer: Ansaldo/Firema
- Constructed: 1998–2004
- Entered service: 1999
- Scrapped: 2025
- Number built: 32
- Successor: SL18
- Fleet numbers: 141–172
- Capacity: 212
- Operator: Sporveien Trikken
- Depots: Grefsen, Holtet
- Line served: 13, 19

Specifications
- Car body construction: Aluminium
- Car length: 33.12 m (108 ft 8 in)
- Width: 2.6 m (8 ft 6 in)
- Height: 3,625 mm (11 ft 10.7 in)
- Floor height: 350 mm (1 ft 2 in)
- Low-floor: 50%
- Doors: 4 per side (8 total)
- Wheel diameter: 680 mm (27 in)
- Wheelbase: 1.8 m (5 ft 11 in)
- Maximum speed: 80 km/h (50 mph)
- Weight: 64 t (63 long tons; 71 short tons)
- Traction system: IGBT–VVVF
- Traction motors: 8 × MTA-A6-105V 105 kW (141 hp)
- Power output: 840 kW (1,130 hp)
- Acceleration: 1.5 m/s^{2} (4.9 ft/s^{2})
- Electric systems: 750 V DC overhead catenary
- Current collection: Pantograph
- UIC classification: Bo′+Bo′Bo′+Bo′
- Safety system: ATP (Note: Only used between Lilleaker and Bekkestua on Lilleaker/Kolsås Line)
- Track gauge: 1,435 mm (4 ft 8 1/2 in) standard gauge

SL95 was a series of 32 low-floor, articulated trams operated on the Oslo Tramway. The series was built by Italian rail manufacturer Ansaldo/Firema, later known as AnsaldoBreda (now Hitachi Rail Italy), and delivered between 1999 and 2004. Capacity for the eight-axle, three-section vehicles is 212 passengers, of which 88 can be seated. The name derives from being ordered in 1995. Original plans called for the delivery to be between 1997 and 1998. Delivery took many years due to a magnitude of technical flaws, including high noise levels, freezing during the winter and corrosion. The trams are 33.12 metres (108 ft 8 in) long, 2.6 metres (8 ft 6 in) wide and 3.62 metres (11 ft 11 in) tall. The aluminum vehicles weigh 64.98 tonnes (63.95 long tons; 71.63 short tons) and have a power output of 840 kilowatts (1,130 hp).

The trams operated on lines 13, 17 and 18. Due to their heavy weight and large turning radius they were unsuitable for the other lines. Prior to the introduction of the SL18, they were the only bi-directional trams in the fleet, and were therefore needed on lines 17 and 18 along the Ullevål Hageby Line. The trams cost about 20 million kr each, but discounts were awarded after the delays and technical faults.

The SL95 and SL79 tram fleets were gradually phased out between 2020 and 2025 and replaced by new SL18 trams, with the SL95 withdrawn in April 2025 and the SL79 in September 2025.

== Background ==
In the early 1990s, Oslo Sporveier was in need of new trams to operate on their network. Except for 40 articulated SL79-trams that had been delivered between 1982 and 1990, the company had several series of non-articulated trams with trailers that were built before 1960. The largest series were 13 SM53s, 11 rebuilt SM83s and 28 trailers, in addition to 34 SM91s that had been bought used from the Gothenburg Tramway in 1991. Oslo Sporveier considered several possibilities for new trams, including ordering additional SL79s, purchasing motorized trailers for SL79, purchasing new low-floor trams, purchasing trams from ČKD Tatra, purchasing the 11 used TT Class 8 trams from Trondheim, rebuild the SL79s with an additional section or purchasing used articulated trams from abroad. Purchasing used material and rebuilding the SL79s was quickly rejected. A non-articulated Tatra tram was tested in Oslo during January 1991.

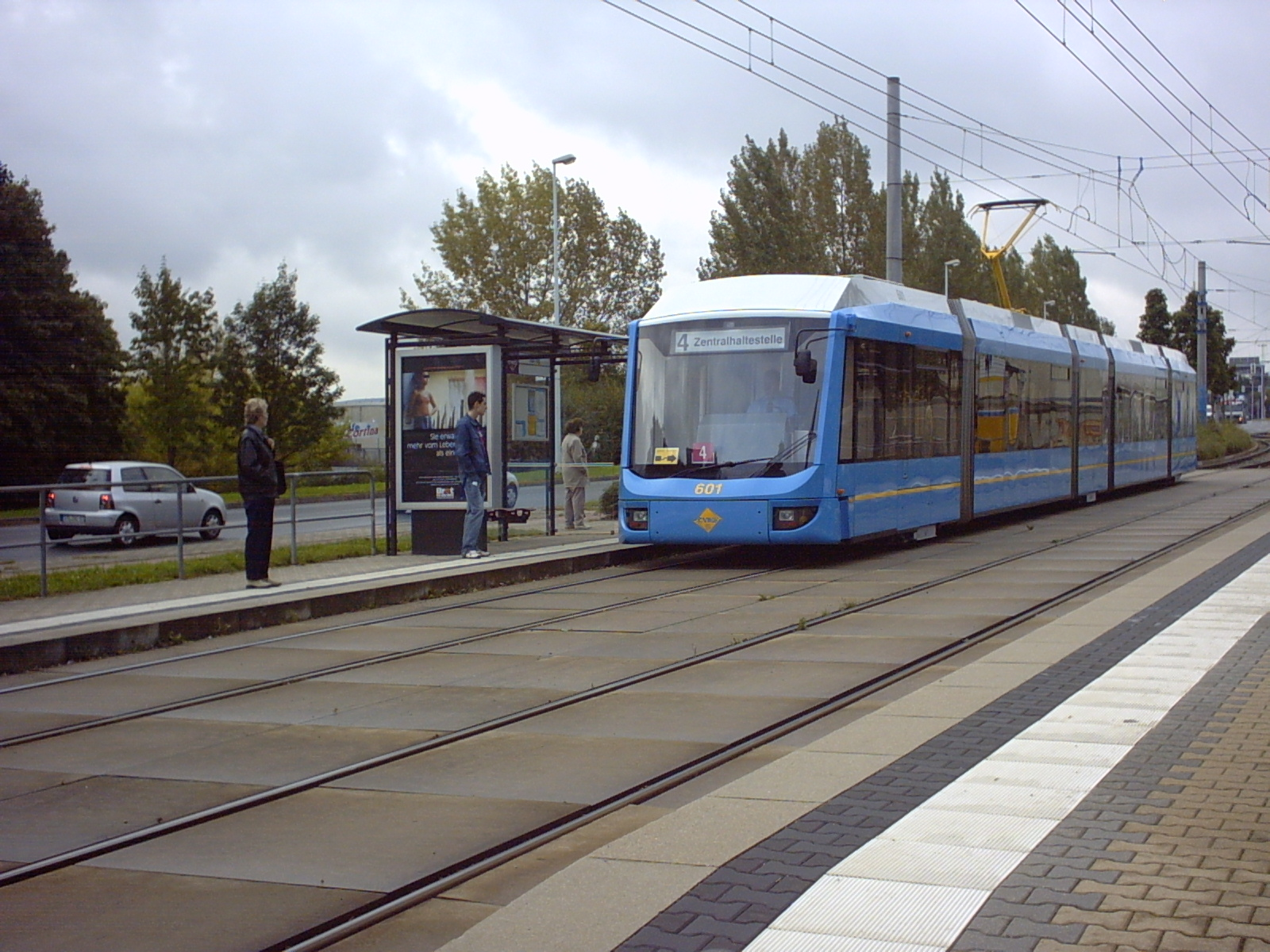
In 1995, Oslo Sporveier tried out a Variotram built by ABB, that was borrowed from Chemnitz, Germany (pictured)

Oslo Sporveier had previously bought all their new trams custom-made. For the 1995 order, the company instead wanted to purchase a pre-designed tram. The company for a long time considered purchasing trams along with Storstockholms Lokaltrafik, who were needing new rolling stock for two light rail systems in Stockholm, Sweden. Three existing trams were tested in Oslo during 1995, and several trams were also tested in Stockholm.

The first was a six-axle articulated tram from Kassel, Germany, with 80% low floor. The company disliked the lack of air suspension and a door construction where the doors went outwards. A Variotram built by ABB from the Chemnitz Stadtbahn was also tested. It has 100% low-floor, is 2.65 metres (8 ft 8 in) wide and also has outward-opening doors. The width made it unsuitable for stopping at some of the new stops. Oslo Sporveier stated that although the tram had many nice features, it was too experimental for their liking. The final tested vehicle was a Class T LRV from the Vienna tramway. The six-axle vehicle was not well-adapted for the Oslo system, since it was built after German light rail standards with high platforms and 25 metres (82 ft 0 in) curve radius, and could not be operated on the Briskeby Line and the loop at Jar on the Lilleaker Line.

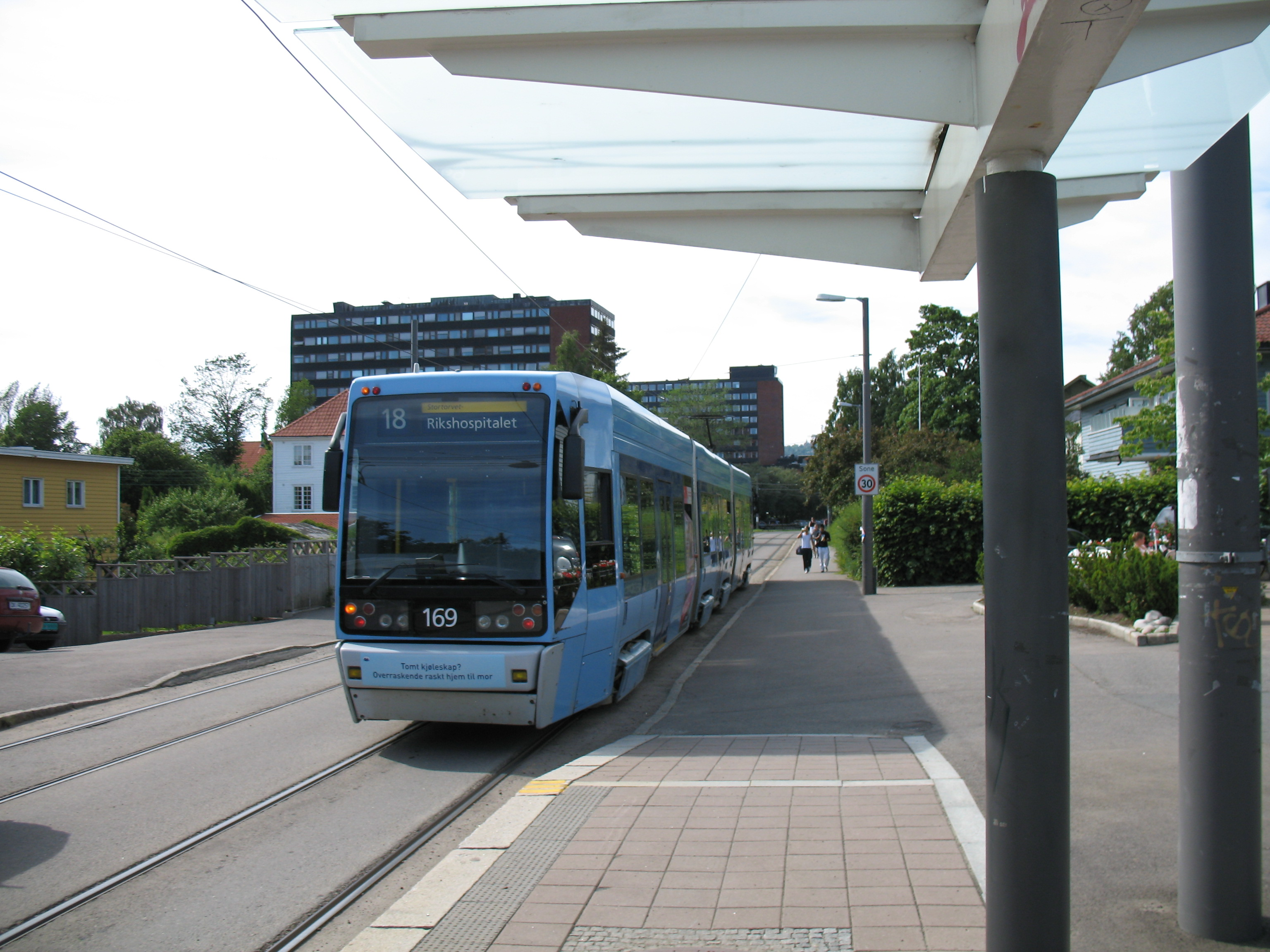
The SL95 were first put into service on the Ullevål Hageby Line, here at John Colletts plass

Following the tests in Oslo, a delegation was sent to look at compatible systems outside Oslo. After it had returned, the company went into negotiations with three manufacturers: Duewag, Bautzen and Ansaldo/Firema. Oslo Sporveier signed a contract with Ansaldo/Firema for delivery of 17 units in 1997–98, with options for additional 15 units. The first 17 units cost 335 million kr, or NOK 20 million per vehicle. The option rights were later exercised, and the total order was increased to 32. This allowed Oslo Sporveier to replace all trams that were not articulated, and would give a maximum age in the tram fleet to 18 years. While Oslo Sporveier at first had planned to debt-finance the purchase, by 1999 it was decided that the trams would be leased from Skandinaviska Enskilda Banken. Due to a labor dispute about privatizing the operation of the tramway and the Oslo Metro, the ownership of all trams and metro trains, including the SL95, were transferred to the municipally owned limited company Oslo Vognselskap in 2007.

== Construction and delivery ==
In January 1997, two bogies were installed and tested on a ST55-tram trailer. On 10 February 1997, a mock-up of the driver's cab was made in Italy and sent to Oslo to try to optimize the layout. On 8 April 1997, Oslo Sporveier decided to order an additional 13 trams. The full options were not realized due to lack of funding. At the same time it was decided that all SM91-trams would be retired, while some SM83-trams would remain in service after the full delivery of the SL95s. By 1998, delivery date for the first vehicle, no. 141, was set to 23 May, with plans to put it into scheduled service on 23 June. The mock-up was scrapped on 12 February. However, the tram was not completed until October, when representatives for the tram company could operate it for the first time at Firema's plant. This delay was caused by the roof having blown off the plant. A NOK 1 million discount per tram was granted due to the incident.

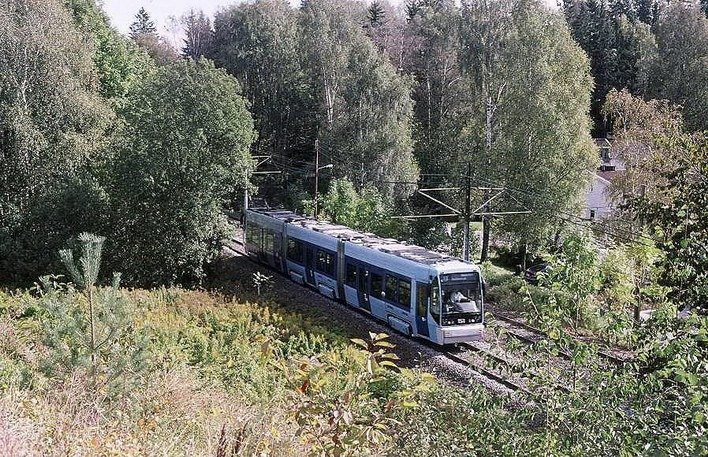
A tram running along the Kolsås Line in 2007, while Oslo Metro services along the line had been terminated.

Tram no. 141 arrived at Oslo on 5 January 1999 in three parts. They were connected together and tried within the end of the month on the entire network, prior to the delivery of tram 142. Delivery frequency was set to every two weeks. During periods from April through June, the voltage along sections of the Lilleaker Line was raised from 600 to 750 V; this included trials with the SL95 to ensure that it could operate under this current as well.

Tram 141 was first used in scheduled traffic on 30 May, when it was put into service on the newly extended Ullevål Hageby Line. This line had been extended 1.6 kilometres (0.99 mi) to Rikshospitalet, where it would serve the new national hospital. Unlike all the other lines of the tramway, this terminus does not have a turning loop, so only bidirectional trams can operate. SL95 was the only bidirectional tram in Oslo Sporveier's fleet. Delays in the delivery caused the line to terminate at John Colletts plass, where there is a turning loop.

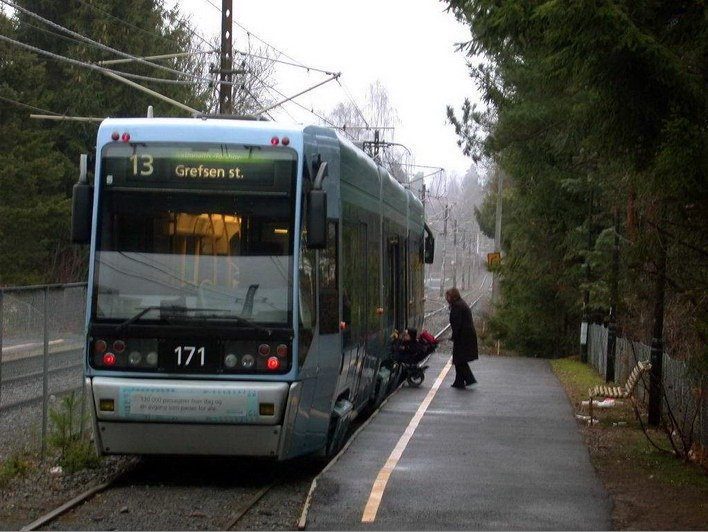
SL95 no. 171 at Bekkestua in 2007

Tram 142 was first used in schedule service on 1 June 1999, and 143 was delivered to Oslo on 3 June. To be able to use the trams on the desired lines, Oslo Sporveier had to upgrade its infrastructure several places. The SL95 need a vertical curve radius of 500 metres (1,600 ft), requiring upgrades at Wessels plass and Gamlebyen. The curves would also need to be fixed at Geita Bridge, but this was not done since the trams exceed the bridge's permitted load. The minimum permitted horizontal curve radius is 17 metres (55 ft 9 in), making it impossible for the trams to operate through the intersection between Riddervolds gate and Inkognitogata, where the radius is 16.5 metres (54 ft 2 in). This means the trams cannot operate on the Briskeby Line, and all trams to Majorstuen are therefore operated with SL79. Restrictions on two trams passing was issued on several shorter sections, including the S-curve from Kirkeristen to Stortorvet, but these sections were quickly rebuilt.

By 2000, deliveries were delayed, and in June all trams were taken out of service for three weeks to modify the gearboxes. In October, ten of thirteen trams were taken out of service due to radial run-out. The problem was large enough that some trams got a new radial run-out the day after they were fixed. From 6 January 2001, SL95 could be used on the Grünerløkka–Torshov Line, and from 6 February, on the Ekeberg Line. However, the latter still had too short platforms.

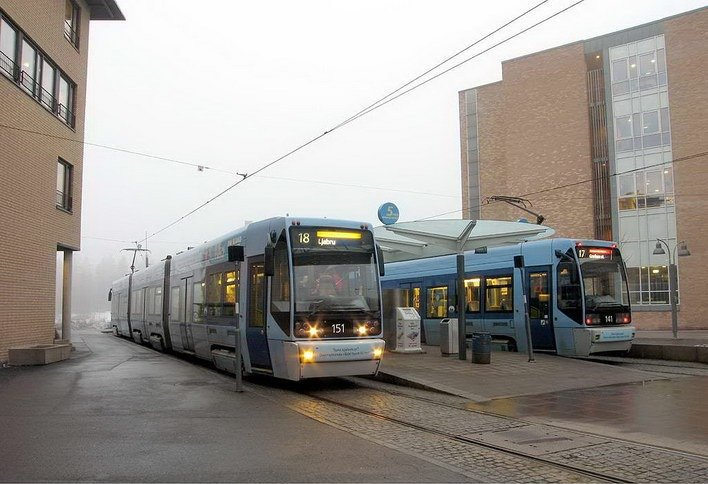
No. 141 and 151 awaiting departure on each their line at Rikshospitalet

Operation proved to give several major difficulties, and by March 2001, Oslo Sporveier was threatening to terminate the purchase agreement unless the manufacturer—who by then had merged to become AnsaldoBreda—fixed the problems. These included the noise being 15 dB too loud, and trams being out of service during the January–February cold spell, when batteries and rectifiers would not operate. It was agreed that AnsaldoBreda would have to replace all 256 motors to satisfy the criteria in the contract. By 1 June, AnsaldoBreda had delivered one tram that met all the contract's criteria. Tram 155 was by then still undelivered, and was being used for testing by the manufacturer. At the same time, 149 was being used for tests in Oslo. The trams were taken out of service, and gradually put back as they were upgraded. In February 2002, tram 155 was equipped with new motors, and a new agreement was made where all motors would be replaced by December 2003, if Oslo Sporveier was satisfied with six months of trials with 155.

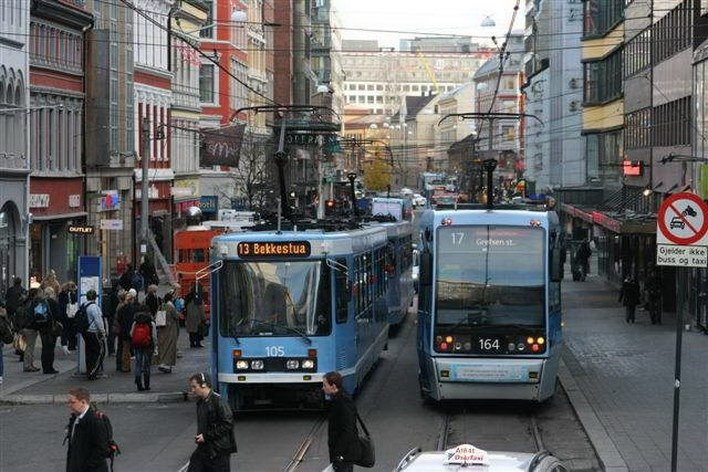
SL79 and SL95 trams in Storgata

The last day with SM91 in service was on 1 November 2002. By then, 27 of the SL95-trams had been delivered, and Oslo Sporveier was able to operate its entire network with only articulated trams. Until 2003, trams 142 and 149 were not in service for long-term repairs. On 8 July 2004, a computer error caused tram 161 neither to be able to run nor open the doors, even with the emergency system. This was caused by the computer indicating that the tram was running at 12.5 kilometres per hour (7.8 mph) while it stood still. All trams were later altered so the motorman could override such incidents. The final trams were delivered in 2004, and no. 142 was put into service in January 2005. At the same time, corrosion was discovered inside the articulation of tram 141. In 2006, Oslo Sporveier introduced a program to upgrade all the SL95-trams, including removing corrosion from the bodywork and the inside, as well as simplifying the lubrication of the joints, which prior to the upgrades required the entire trams to be de-hooked. These upgrades are planned to be completed by 2009. The trams have also had problems with the air supply freezing during cold spells, making it impossible to retract the side mirrors when changing direction, and terminating the secondary suspension. This requires the trams to be operated at walking speed without passengers.

== Specifications ==
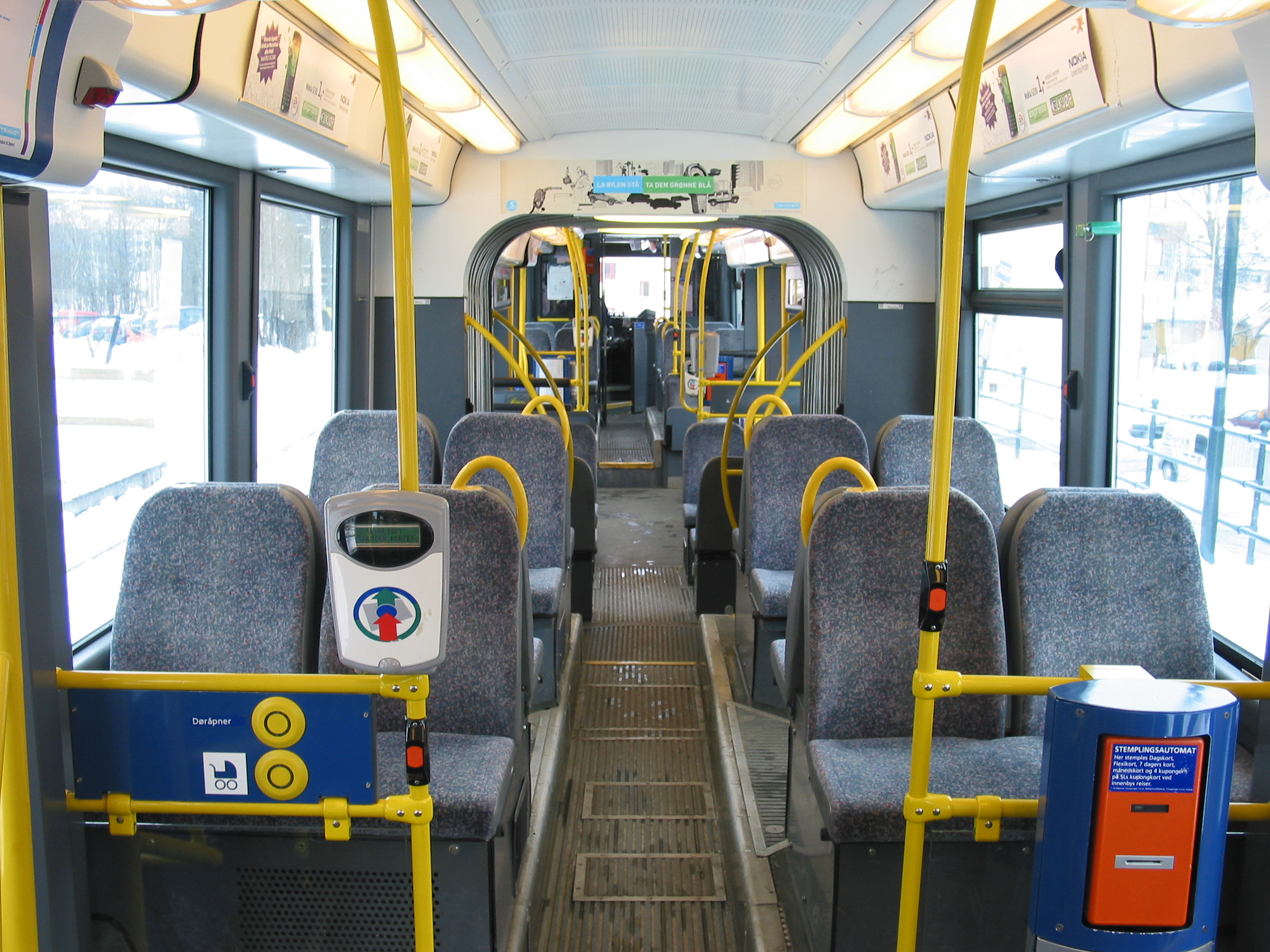
The interior (1999-late 2017).

SL95 is a bidirectional, eight-axle articulated tram built exclusively for the Oslo Tramway by Ansaldo of Italy. The tram has three sections, with one bogie on the first and last section and two bogies on the center section. The body is in aluminum, with sections that are welded along the floor and roof, and bolted on the side, to ease replacement of dented sections. The trams are 33.12 meters (108 ft 8 in) long, 2.6 meters (8 ft 6 in) wide and 3.62 meters (11 ft 11 in) tall. The axle distance in the bogies is 1.80 meters (5 ft 11 in), and the distance between the bogie centers is 9.85 meters (32 ft 4 in) from the center to the end, and 5.17 meters (17 ft 0 in) between the two in the center. The tram weighs 64.2 tonnes (63.2 long tons; 70.8 short tons) empty, and 78.3 tonnes (77.1 long tons; 86.3 short tons) with payload.

Each of the four bogies have two three-phase asynchronous motors on a steel bogie with two axles. The wheels have a 680-millimeter (27 in) diameter when new and 610-millimeter (24 in) when fully worn. The axles are rubber-suspended against the bogies, while the bogies are air-suspended against the chassis. The motors are type MTA-F6-105V built by Ansaldo, and each motor outputs 105 kilowatts (141 hp) at 750 V DC. This allows a maximum speed of 80 kilometres per hour (50 mph) and an acceleration of 1.5 m/s/s (3.4 mph/s). The vehicle can be reversed, but the speed is then automatically limited to 15 kilometres per hour (9.3 mph). While the tram operated with 600 V, it had power output of 672 kilowatts (901 hp).

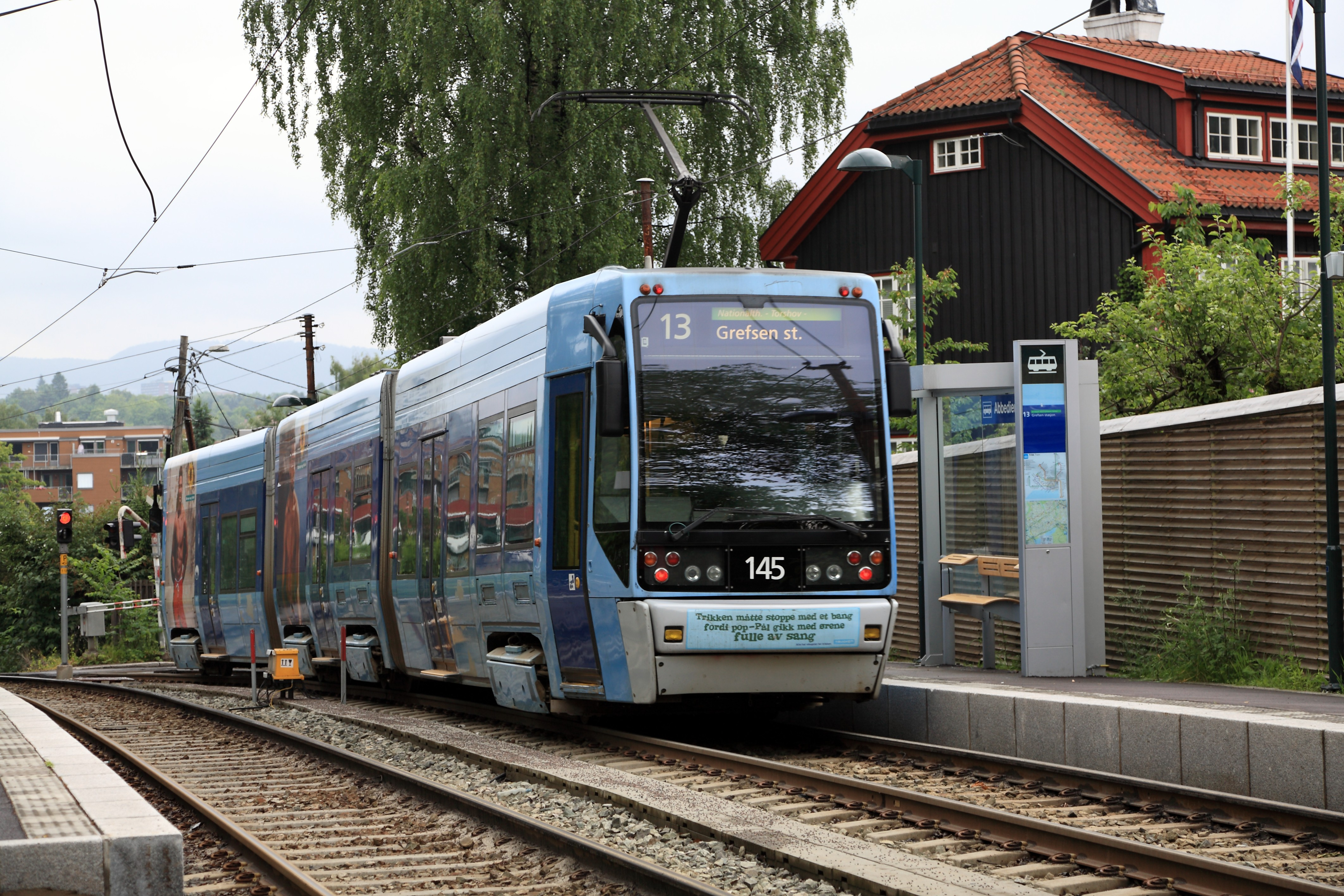
A tram at Abbediengen

The vehicles have three braking systems: a primary regenerative dynamic brake, a secondary disc brake and an emergency rail brake. When braking with the regenerative brake, the energy can be fed back to the overhead wires. The trams are dimensioned to operate an entire day with the dynamic brakes disconnected from one bogie, and for one hour if disconnected from two bogies, in which case only disc brakes will be used. The trams are bidirectional, with a driver's cab at each end. These cabs are built so the motorman can also sell tickets. The cab's have a door to close them off, so the riders cannot access rear cab. There are four doors on both sides; the front door is single while the three back doors are double. In addition to the front door, there is one door in each section. To operate the doors on the left side, the motorman must engage a security switch. It is also possible to open each individual door on the right side from the driver's cab. Half the length is low-floor, with an entry height at 350 millimetres (14 in), including three of the four doors. There are 88 seats, of which 64 are on the high-floor section, giving a total capacity of 212 riders. All of the rollsigns was replaced with LED signs, similar to SL79 in 2019.

== Operation ==
Prior to the introduction of the SL18, the SL95s made up 32 of the 72 trams in the system, supplementing the older SL79. The SL95s were the only bidirectional trams, and therefore the only ones that could operate on the Ullevål Hageby Line, that is served by lines 17 and 18. Since line 13 is a continuation of line 17 at Sinsen, the SL95s also operated on that line. Due to the tight curve radius on the Briskeby Line, SL95 trams rarely operated to Majorstuen, and when they did, they used the Frogner Line and/or the Homansbyen Line; At the turn close to the Inkognitogata stop at the Briskeby Line, there is a sign warning operators to take care with SL95 trams. The trams ran on the Ullevål Hageby-, Ekeberg-, Sinsen-, Grünerløkka–Torshov-, Lilleaker- Skøyen, and rarely in the Homansbyen- Frogner lines. Each service has a ten-minute headway, giving a five-minute interval on section that are served by two lines.

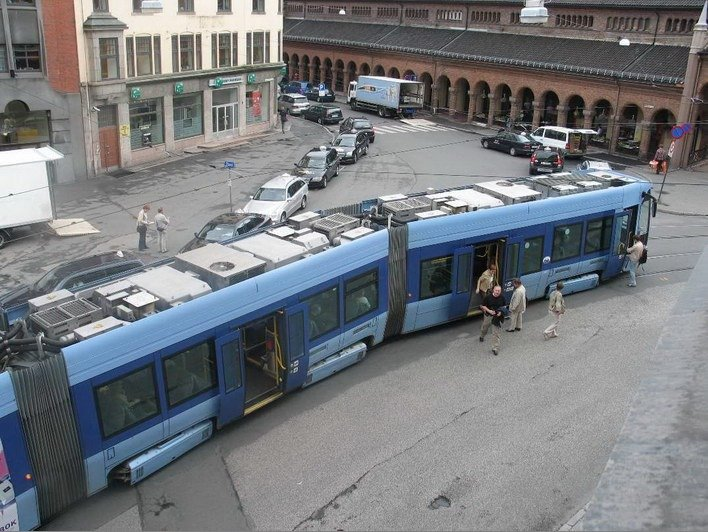
SL95 tram at Kirkeristen, showing the amount of roof-mounted equipment

In 2007, two trams were involved in an accident and sent to Firema for repair. However, the company filed for bankruptcy, and as of October 2010 the trams were still not repaired or returned to Oslo. In 2010, Commissioner for Environmental Affairs and Transport Jøran Kallmyr (Progress Party) stated that the SL95 trams were being considered for replacement, at the same time as the much older SL79. Problems with the units included excessive noise, excessive amount of time out of order, rust, cracks in the axles, and increased wear to the infrastructure because they weighed too much. All except two of the SL95 trams were temporarily grounded on 29 April 2013 when it was discovered that rust had damaged the joints between the articulated sections on several trams.

From 2012, the trams were equipped with an automatic train protection system, which allowed them to run concurrently with the metro trains on the Kolsås Line. Oslo Vognselskap announced in September 2012 that they were preparing a tender to receive bids for new trams, which would replace all SL79 and SL95 units. In addition to procuring about seventy new units, Ruter initiated plans to upgrade the tramways for a combined NOK 4 billion. Oslo Vognselskap stated that the replacement trams would be about the same size as SL95, but weigh only 40 tonnes (39 long tons; 44 short tons), giving less wear on the tracks, and have a floor height of 30 centimeters (12 in). Replacements of the trams started in October 2020 when the new SL18 trams were first delivered and were completed by April 2025 when all 87 new trams are delivered. Older SL79 trams remained in service until September 2025 but were eventually replaced by the new trams.
