= Rikshospitalet tram stop =

Light rail tram stop in Oslo, Norway

Rikshospitalet
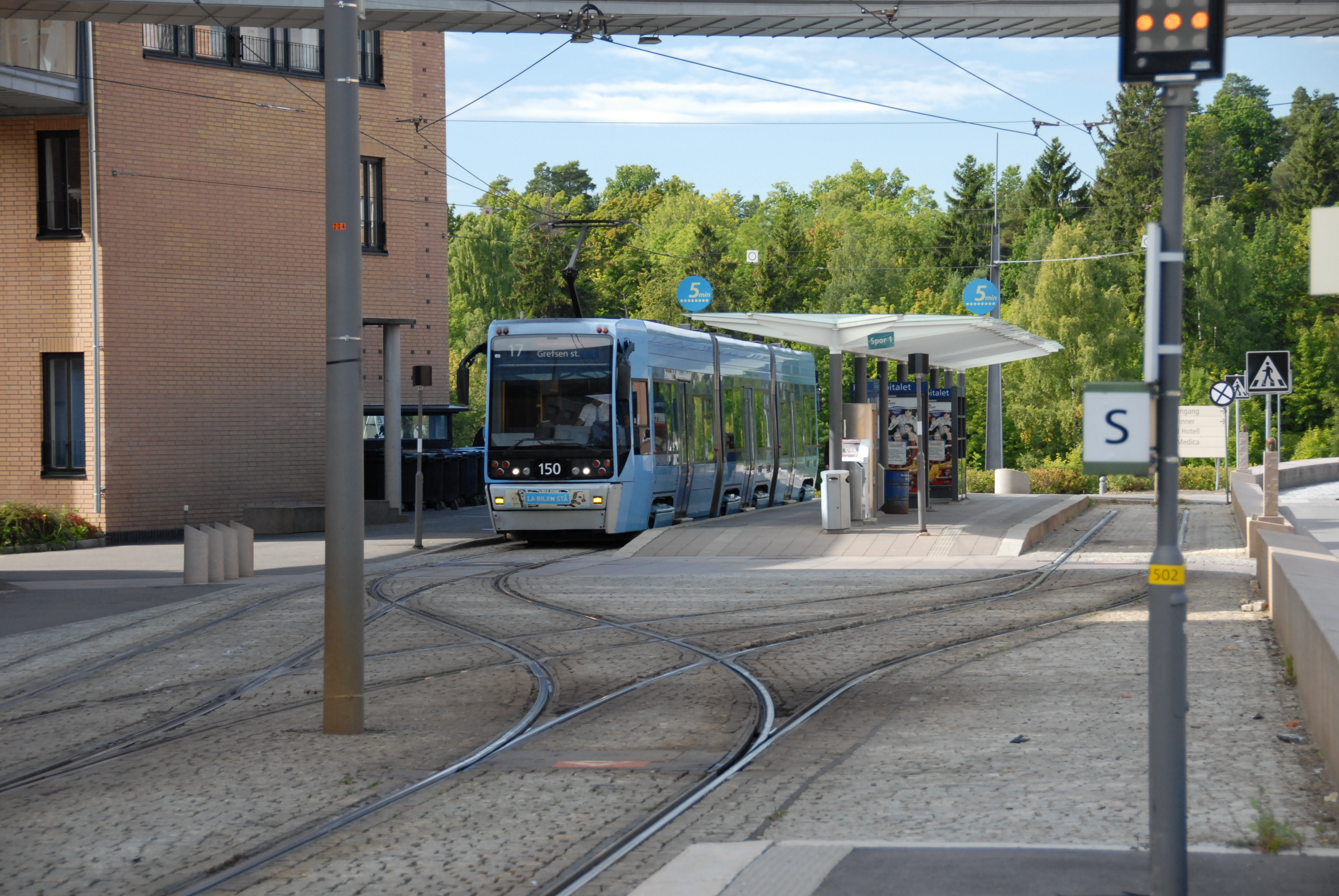

General information
- Location: Gaustad, Nordre Aker, Oslo; Norway
- Coordinates: 59.947768°N 10.714716°E
- Line: Ullevål Hageby Line

History
- Opened: 1 June 1999
Location

Rikshospitalet is a light rail tram stop at the end of the Ullevål Hageby Line of the Oslo Tramway. It is located at Rikshospitalet, the Norwegian National Hospital, at Gaustad in Oslo, Norway.

The station opened on 1 June 1999 as part of the line extension when the hospital opened. The expansion was financed by Oslo Package 2. The station is served by lines 17 and 18, using SL95 low-floor trams. This allows step-free access from and to all stations until the city center. Trams operate each five minutes. The next station is Gaustadalléen. In the past, line 10 which ran from Rikshospitalet to Jar, used to operate here.

== Temporary closure ==
The hospital is being expanded and is due to be completed in 2031. On this occasion, the terminal stops near the staff and main entrances have been temporarily closed since September 2024. The tram stop at Rikshospitalet is temporarily closed until the new Rikshospitalet is completed in 2031.

Preceding station	Trams in Oslo	Following station
Terminus	Line 17	Gaustadalléen towards Grefsen
Terminus	Line 18	Gaustadalléen towards Grefsen
