= Katnosa =

Lake in Lunner, Norway

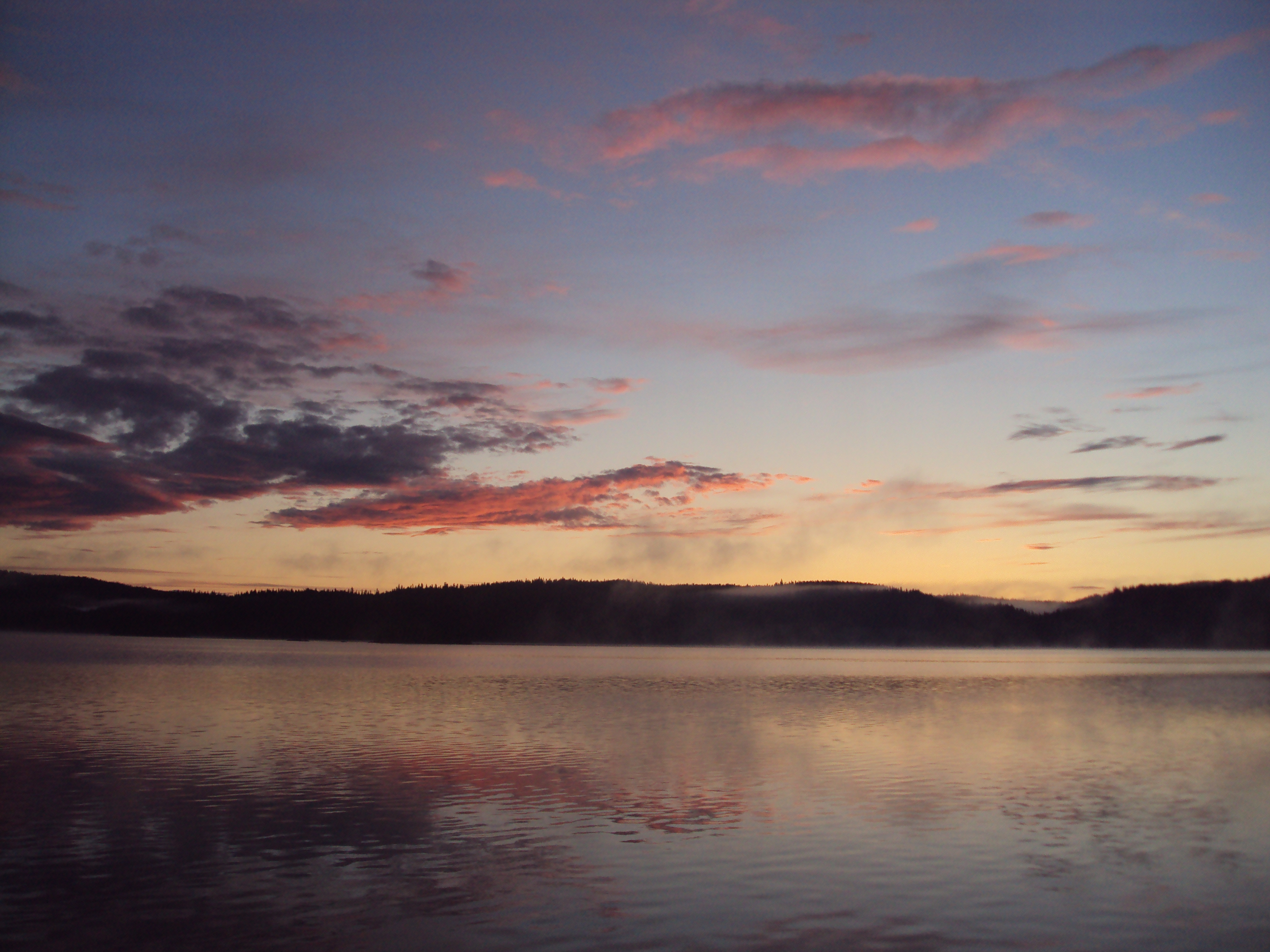
- Katnosa

- Location within Akershus Location within Buskerud Location within Norway
- Location: Nordmarka (Lunner, Jevnaker and Ringerike)
- Coordinates: 60°09′N 10°35′E
- Primary outflows: Katnoselva
- Basin countries: Norway
- Surface area: 2.2 km^{2} (0.85 sq mi)
- Surface elevation: 464 m (1,522 ft)

Katnosa is a regulated lake in Nordmarka, Norway bordering to the municipalities Lunner, Jevnaker and Ringerike. It drains through the river Katnoselva to the lakes Store Sandungen, Hakkloa, Bjørnsjøen and Skjærsjøen. It is regulated by the dam Katnosdammen from 1886. Katnosa is part of the Spålen–Katnosa Nature Reserve.
