= Maridalen =

Valley in Oslo, Norway

Coordinates: 59°59′36″N 10°46′32″E

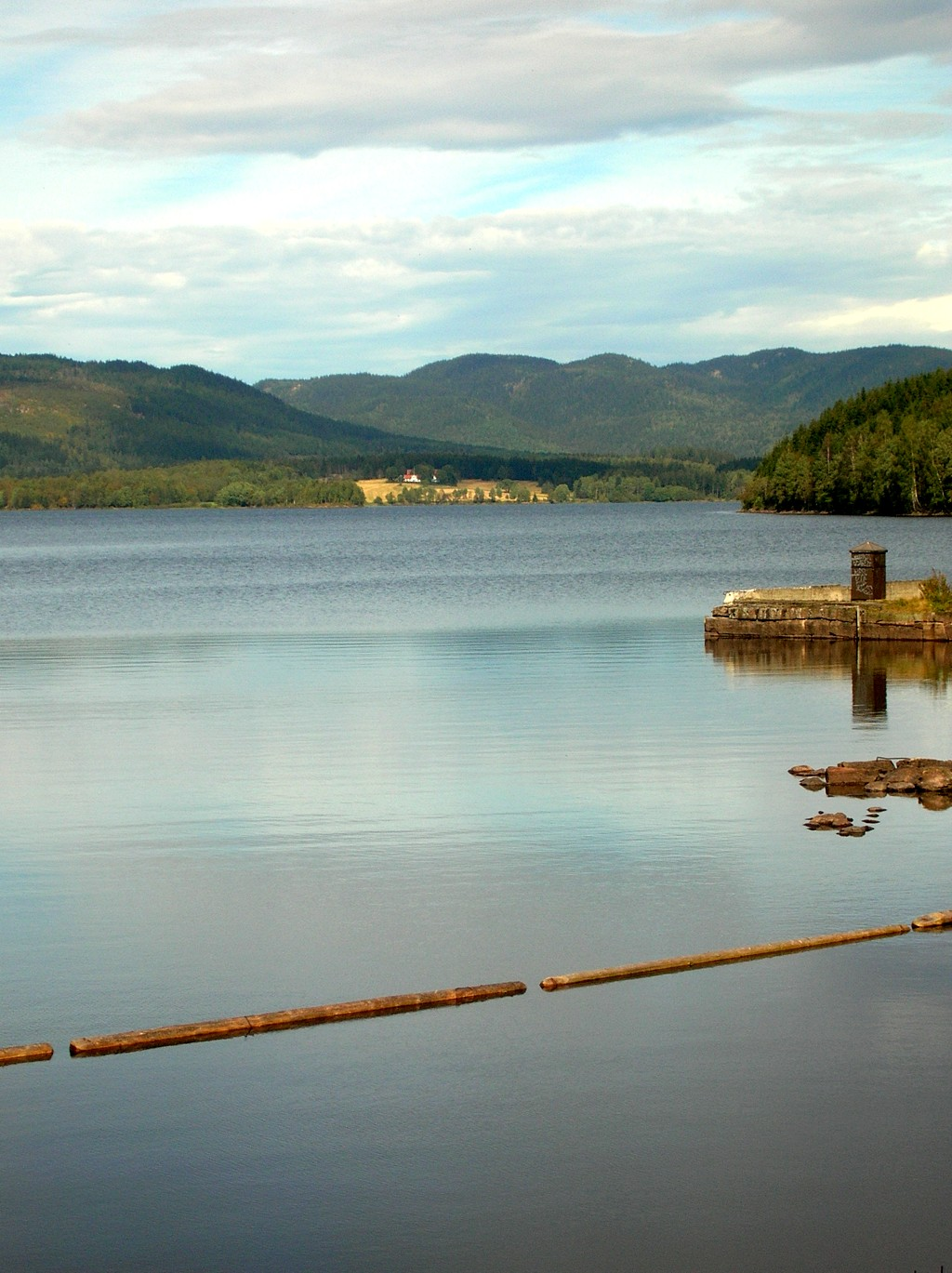
Maridalsvannet from the south

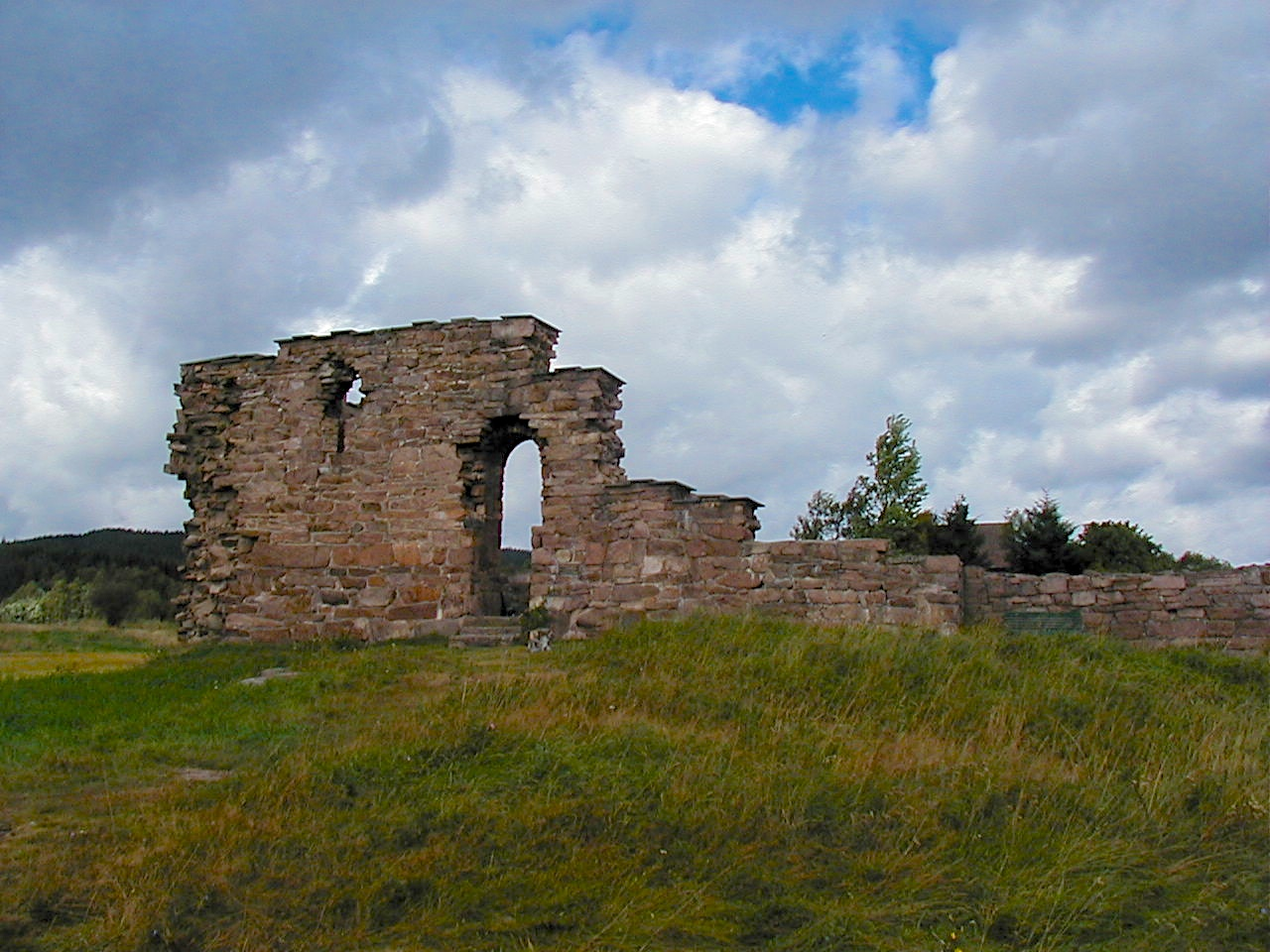
Church ruins of the old Saint Margaret's Church from the 13th century in Maridalen.

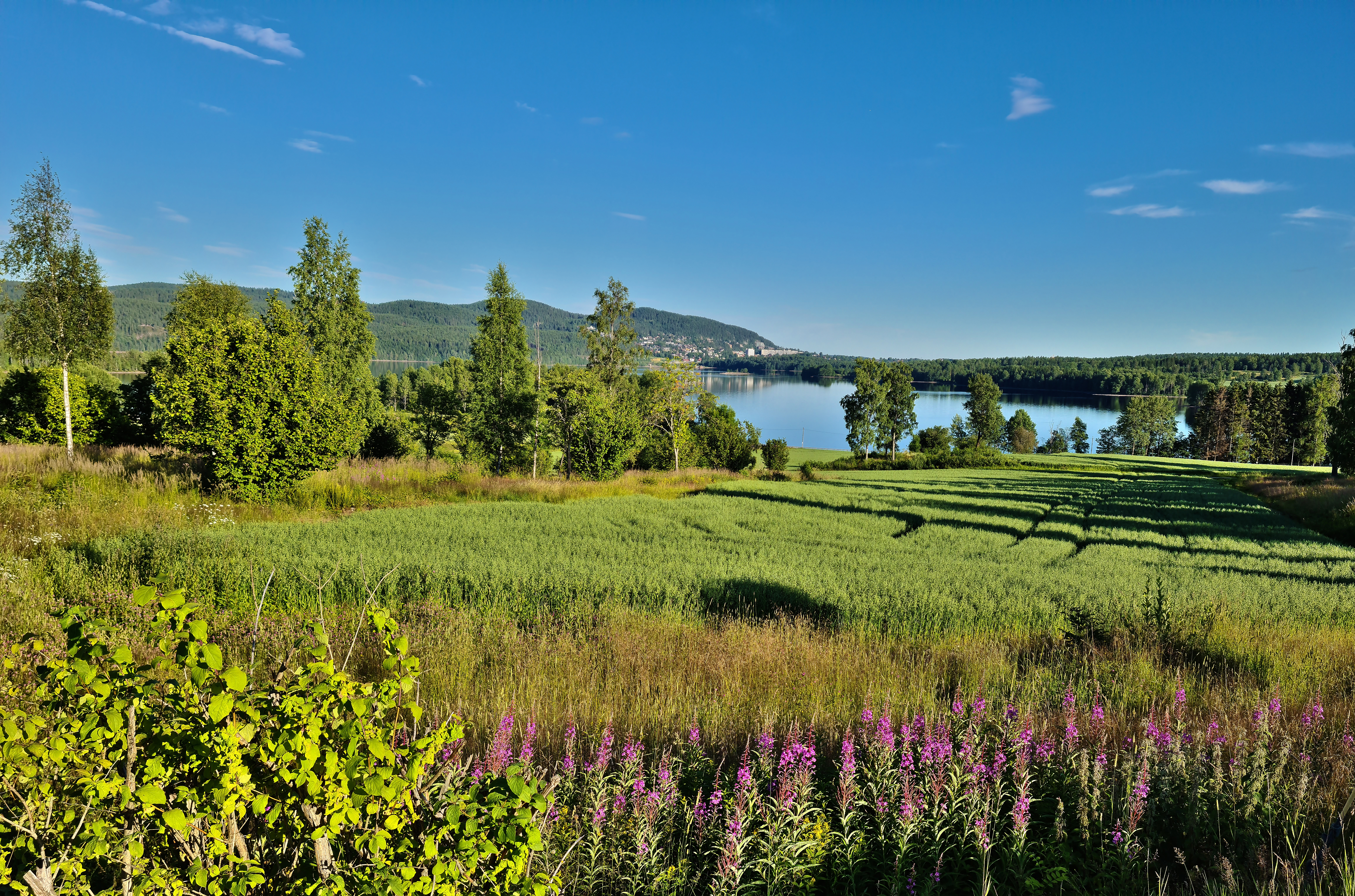
Maridalen and Maridalsvannet

Maridalen is a valley in the north of Oslo, Norway, just above the suburb of Kjelsås. Considering that Maridalen is within the Oslo city limits, this area has a very low population density. The valley consists of forests, lakes and agricultural land. Most of the valley is made up of the lake Maridalsvannet, which serves as the primary source of drinking water for 90% of Oslo's population. The only hydroelectric powerplant within the City of Oslo, Hammeren Hydroelectric Power Station is located at Brekke in Maridalen. The valley is a popular recreational area featuring many hiking trails, cycling tracks for summer usage, and groomed cross-country trails in winter. Both the lake and valley are protected by the community. Maridalen Church and the church ruins of the ancient St. Margaret's Church are located north of Maridalsvannet. A bus route runs along Maridalen, starting at Nydalen Subway Station.

== Railway ==
The Gjøvik Railway Line passes through Maridalen. Originally, the trains stopped at three stations in the area. Movatn Station (created in 1900) is an unstaffed station at Movatn. The Snippen stop (opened in 1934) was an unstaffed train stop with the address Greveveien. Sandermosen Station is a previously operated stop between Kjelsås Station and Snippen train stop. It was opened in 1909, but closed in 2006.

== The name ==
The Norse form of the name was Margrétardalr. The first element is the genitive of Margrét, the last element is dalr m 'dale, valley'. The old church (now in ruins) just north of the lake was dedicated to Margaret the Virgin.

The valley's name cannot be older than the Christianisation of Norway (around 1000 AD), and it probably replaced an older name that has since been forgotten. This is one of the few examples in Norway where an old name of a large valley has been replaced.
