= Hakkloa =

Lake in Oslo, Norway

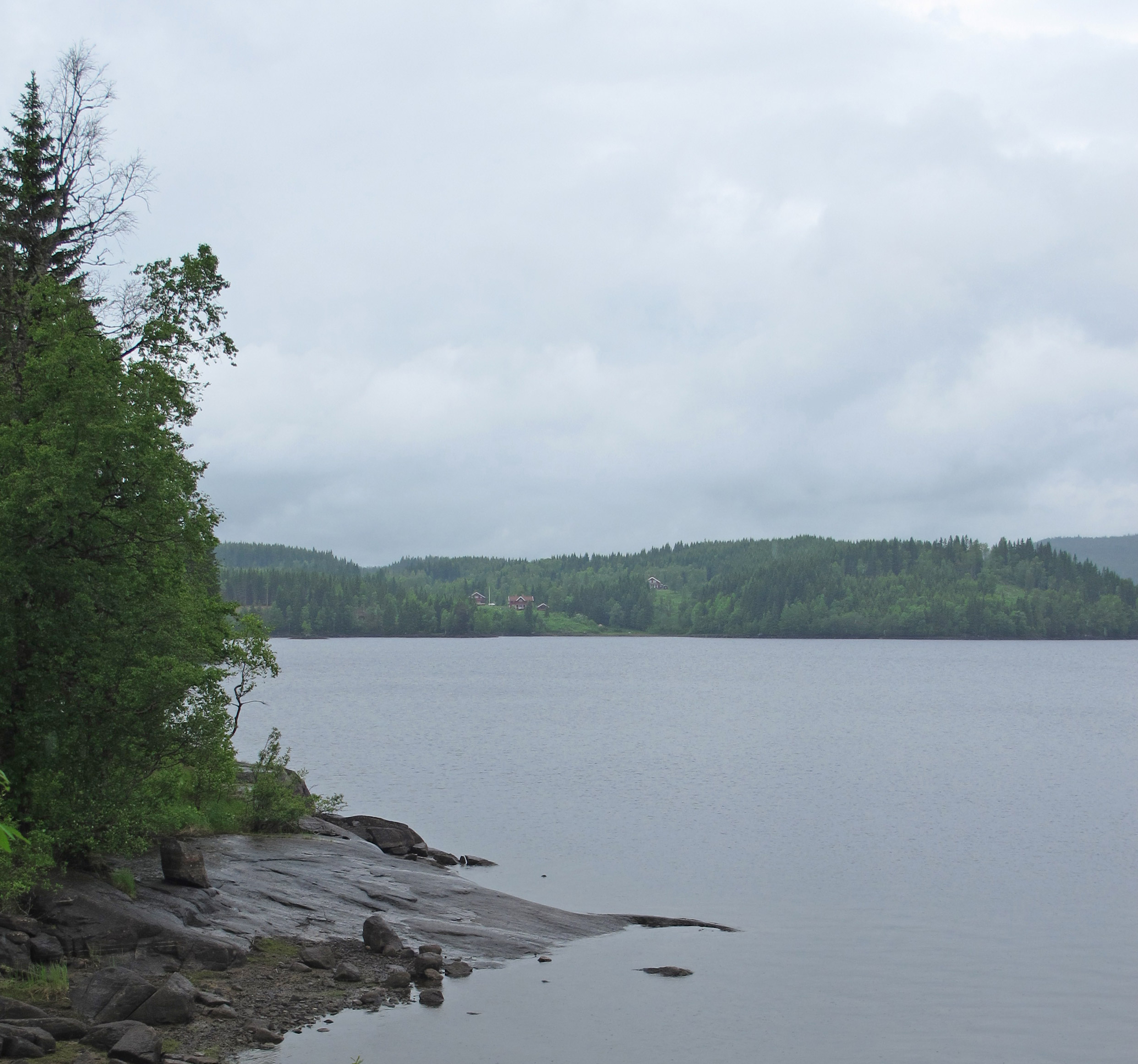

- Location within Norway
- Location: Nordmarka, Oslo
- Coordinates: 60°06′N 10°41′E
- Primary outflows: Hakkloelva
- Basin countries: Norway
- Surface area: 2.1 km^{2} (0.81 sq mi) (including Hakklokalven)
- Surface elevation: 372 m (1,220 ft)

Hakkloa is a regulated lake in Nordmarka in Oslo, Norway. Hakkloa drains through the river Hakkloelva to the lake Bjørnsjøen, and further to Skjærsjøen and Maridalsvannet.
