= Maridalen Church =

- Maridalen kirke
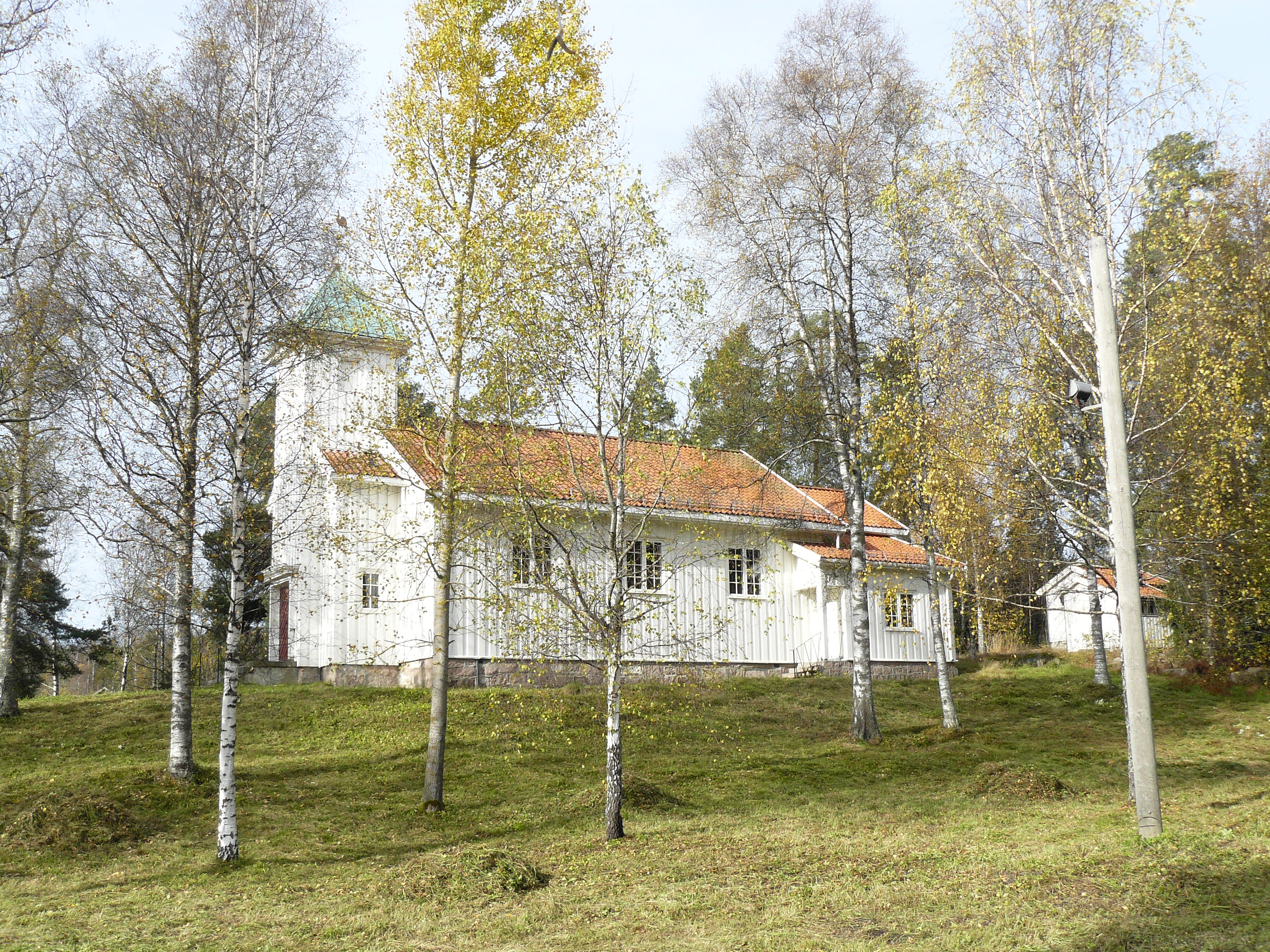
- Maridalen Church
- 59°59′58.15″N 10°46′15.46″E
- Location: Maridalsveien 952; Oslo
- Country: Norway
- Denomination: Church of Norway
- Churchmanship: Evangelical Lutheran

History
- Former name(s): Maridalen bedehus Maridalen kapell
- Status: Parish church

Architecture
- Functional status: Active
- Completed: 1900

Specifications
- Capacity: 140 seats
- Materials: Wood

Administration
- Diocese: Diocese of Oslo
- Deanery: Vestre Aker
- Parish: Maridalen

Maridalen Church is a wooden church in Maridalen at the northern outskirts of Oslo, Norway, next to Nordmarka. The church was originally built as a mission house (Bedehus) in at the northern shore of the lake Maridalsvannet in 1887. It was taken over by the Church of Norway and consecrated first as a chapel in the year 1900, later renamed a church.

Maridalen Church is located not far from the ancient church ruins of the medieval church St Margaret's Church.

Maridalen Church has about 140 seats. The altarpiece is depicting Jesus in Gethsemane. The small bell tower has one church bell from 1898.

Maridalen Church is listed by the Norwegian Directorate for Cultural Heritage.

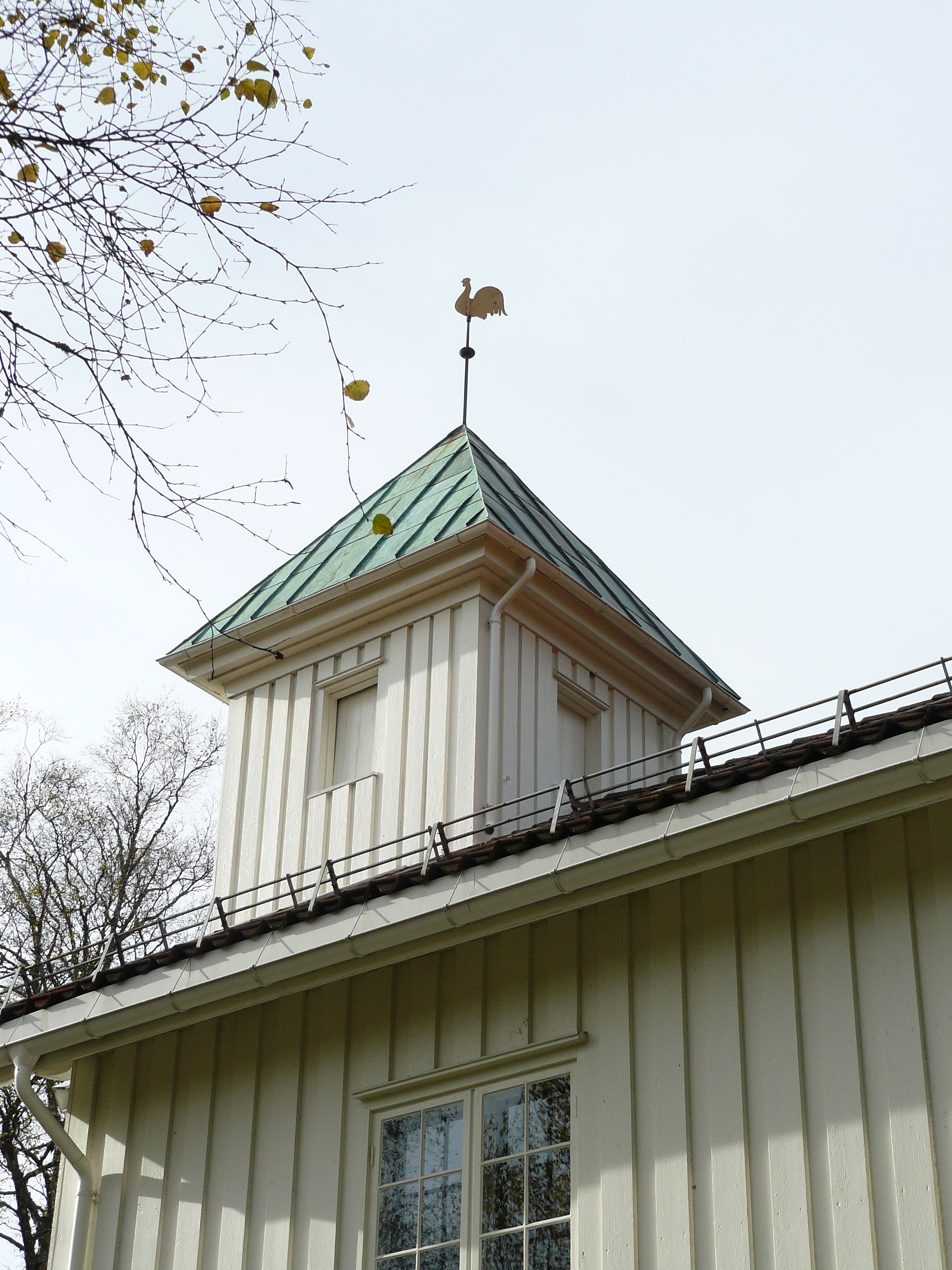
The bell tower (close-up)
