= Brødrene Ottesens Dampchocoladefabrikk =

Former Norwegian chocolate factory

- Formerly: Brødrene Ottesens Eftflg.
- Company type: Aksjeselskap
- Industry: Confectionery
- Founded: 1879
- Founders: Ragnvald Edgar Ottesen; Hallfred Ottesen
- Defunct: 1914
- Fate: Closed; equipment acquired by Freia
- Headquarters: Oslo, Norway
- Products: Chocolate

Brødrene Ottesens Dampchocoladefabrikk (Norwegian for "The Ottesen Brothers' Steam Chocolate Factory") was a chocolate factory in Oslo, founded by the brothers Ragnvald Edgar (1853–1918) and Hallfred Ottesen (1855–1898) in 1879. One of the country's first and largest chocolate factories, it started at Bryn, was for a time at Grønland, and ended by the Akerselva in a building that still stands. Having trained in Germany and worked in Paris, the brothers were the first serious competitor to Carl Kraffts Chocoladefabrik, Norway's first chocolate factory.

Hallfred Ottesen withdrew early and returned to France, and in 1891 the factory passed to Christopher Faye Moestue, who ran it under the name Brødrene Ottesens Eftflg. and moved it to a new building by the Akerselva in 1897. Moestue sold the factory in 1912, and in 1914 the new owners gave up and closed it. The building was sold, and the usable machinery was bought by the expanding Freia, though the factory's original name remained painted on the facade for nearly 100 years.
