= Christiania Torv tram stop =

Tram stop in Oslo, Norway

Christiania Torv
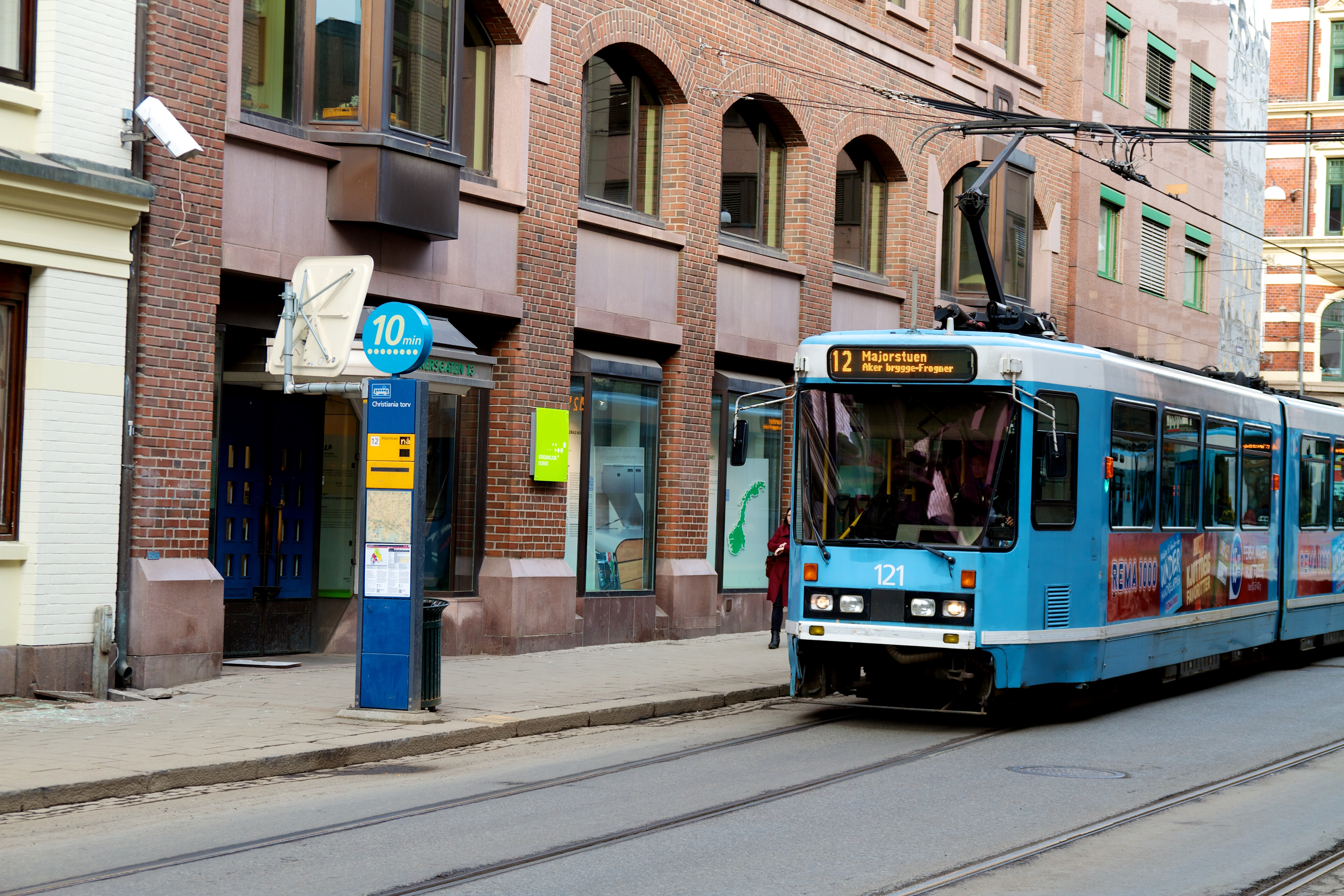

General information
- Location: Oslo city centre, Oslo; Norway
- Coordinates: 59°54′41″N 10°44′22″E
- Line: Vika Line

History
- Opened: 21 August 1995
Location

Christiania Torv is a former tram stop on the Oslo Tramway.

Located in Kvadraturen in downtown of Oslo, it was opened by Oslo Sporveier in 1994 as a part of the Vika Line. It was formerly served by line 12, before being closed in the late 2010s.

Preceding station	Trams in Oslo	Following station
Rådhusplassen towards Majorstuen	Line 12	Kirkegata towards Kjelsås
