= Sandermosen Station =

Railway station in Oslo, Norway

Sandermosen
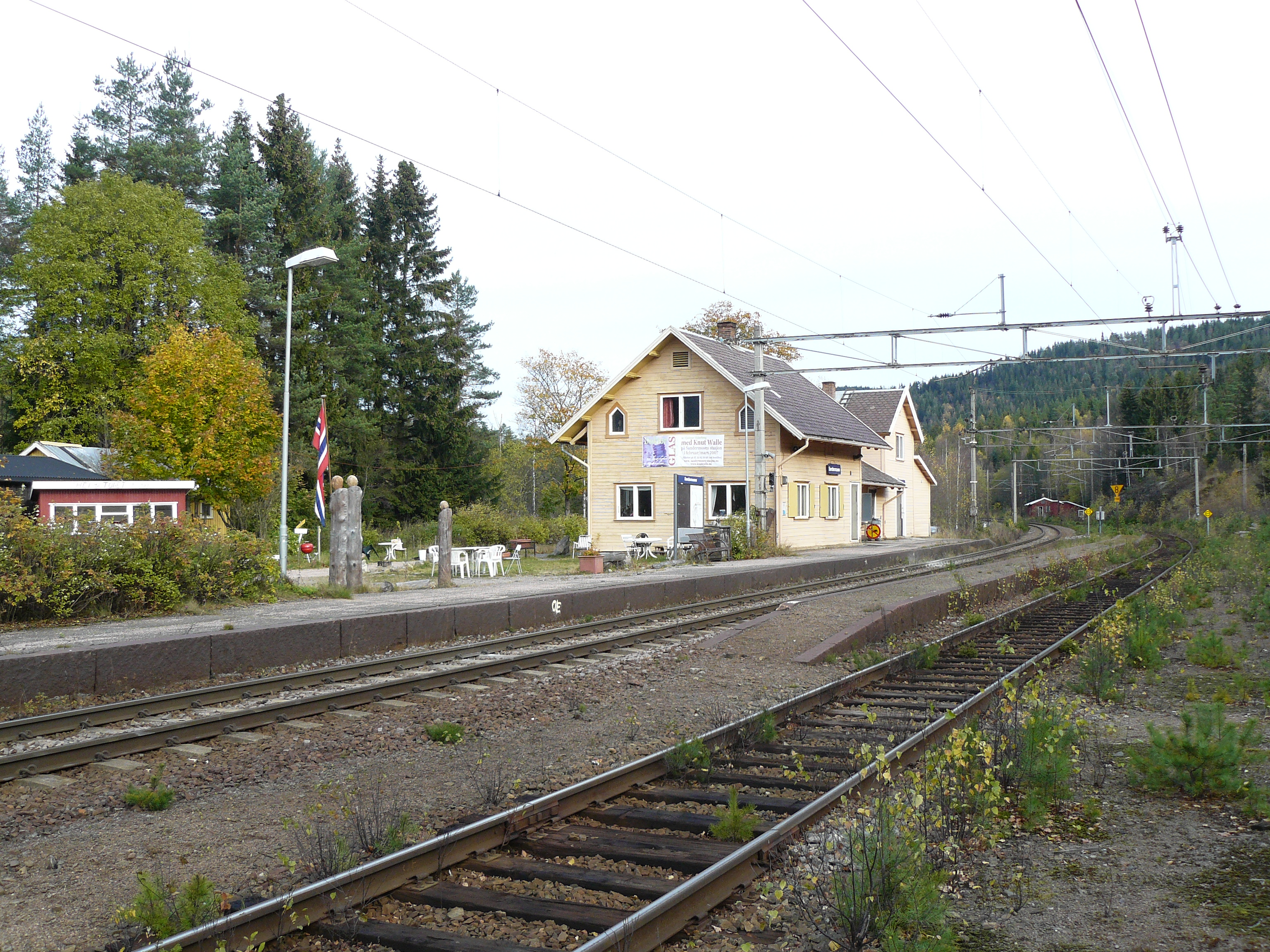

General information
- Location: Sandermosen, Maridalen, Oslo; Norway
- Coordinates: 60°00′32″N 10°48′15″E
- Elevation: 230.6
- Owner: Norwegian National Rail Administration
- Line: Gjøvik Line
- Distance: 15.85 km
- Platforms: 1

History
- Opened: 1909
- Closed: 11 June 2006
Location

Sandermosen Station (Norwegian: Sandermosen stasjon) is a formerly staffed station on the Gjøvik Line located in Maridalen, Oslo, Norway. The station, which formerly had its own station building, is situated just under 16 km from Oslo Central Station between Kjelsås Station and Snippen Station. It was opened in 1909 and closed on 11 June 2006. Since its closure, Snippen has become the nearest station. The area was used as a loading zone as early as 1900, two years prior to the opening of the Gjøvik Line. Today, the station and the station building serve as a hub for cultural activities in the area, promoted by kulturPUNKTET Sandermosen stasjon. A sculpture park is situated next to the track.

In 1921, Dano-Norwegian author Aksel Sandemose took his new surname from Sandermosen, which is where his mother was born.

== Other Sources ==
- (in Norwegian) Kulturarenaen på Sandermosen ("cultural arena at Sandermosen")

Preceding station		Following station
Kjelsås	Gjøvik Line	Snippen
