= Movatn =

Movann Movatn
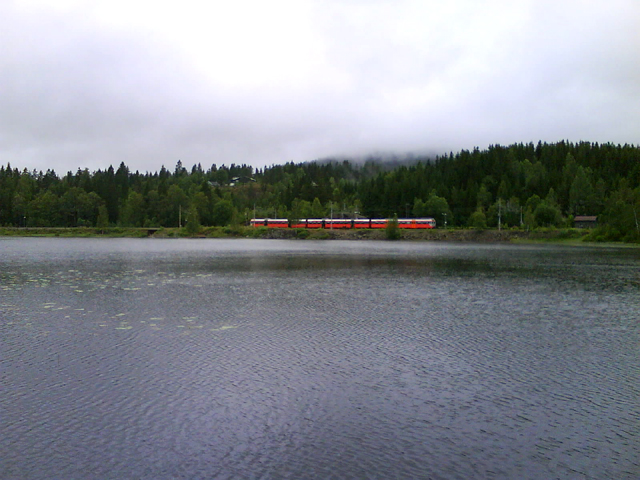
- Movatn stasjon

- Location in Norway
- Coordinates: 60°2′24″N 10°48′24″E
- Country: Norway
- County: Oslo
- District: Maridalen, Nordmarka
- Municipality: Oslo
- Borough: Marka

Area
  - Total: 0.84 km^{2} (0.32 sq mi)

Population (2005)
  - Total: 316
- Time zone: UTC+1 (CET)
  - Summer (DST): UTC+2 (CEST)
- Postal codes: 0890 Oslo

Movann is a lake at the northern end of the village of Sørbråten in Maridalen valley in Nordmarka, a forested part of Oslo, Norway. It has a train station on the Gjøvik Line. The population of Sørbråten is 317.

== Etymology ==
The lake is named after the old farm Mo (Norse Mór) in Nittedal. The name of the farm is identical with the word mór m 'moor, heath'. The last element is vann 'water, lake'.

The name Movann is Bokmål, one of the two official written standards of Norwegian. The name and form of the railway station, Movatn, is Nynorsk.
