= Carl Kraffts Chocoladefabrik =

Norway's first chocolate factory

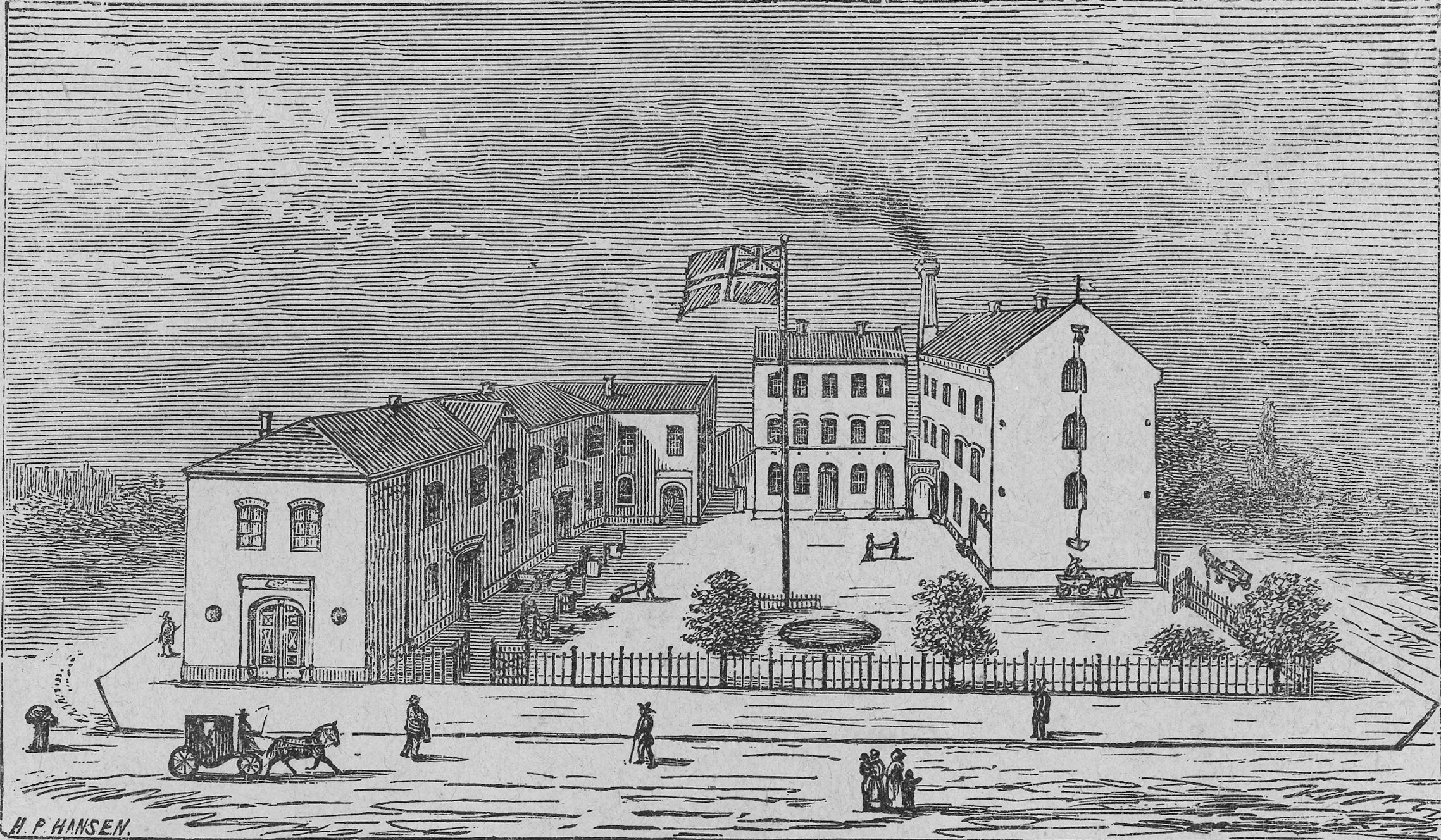
- Industry: Confectionery
- Founded: 1852
- Defunct: 1914
- Fate: Closed
- Headquarters: Oslo, Norway
- Key people: Carl Fredrik August Krafft
- Products: Chocolate, drops, confectionery

Carl Kraffts Chocoladefabrik was a chocolate factory in Oslo. The factory was founded by Carl Fredrik August Krafft in 1852 and is regarded as Norway's first chocolate factory. The business started in Østregade (now Karl Johans gate), and in 1867 Krafft built a new factory in Hausmanns gate, which operated until it was closed in 1914.

== History ==
Carl Fredrik August Krafft, born in 1812 in Copenhagen, was a Danish pharmacist who came to Christiania at the age of 24. With an education from the University of Copenhagen, Krafft began his career in Christiania at the Elefantapoteket pharmacy under Professor Maschmann, but after a short time at the pharmacy he decided to start a shop and run his own business.

On 12 December 1837 Krafft advertised the opening of his own business in the newspaper Den Constitutionelle, with a long list of goods on offer, including spirits and liqueurs, perfumes, hair oils, incense, and ink. As early as May the following year he advertised various types of chocolate from the shop in Østregade.

In 1847 Krafft bought the Lehmann building, where he already lived and partly carried on production. Part of the production was eventually moved to the Robsahm building on the corner of Karl Johans gate 15 and Kongens gate, where Krafft continued to expand the business; among other things he introduced asphalt in Norway, with an agency for a German system. At the time asphalt was regarded as an exclusive floor covering, and Krafft supplied it to the Royal Palace and the Trinity Church, among others. Krafft also started match production, probably in the Robsahm building, in 1845, the year after the bank director F. H. Frølich founded the country's first match factory.

=== Norway's first chocolate factory ===
Carl Krafft ran an extensive business, and in a letter to his mother he expressed concern about the great responsibility and all the employees who depended on his health and presence. He therefore asked his mother to send his younger brother Wilhelm to Norway to relieve him, so that the business would stand more securely if he himself were to fall ill. In 1849 Wilhelm moved into the Lehmann building, and two years later the brothers invested in new and modern machinery for the chocolate factory.

In 1852 Krafft advertised "steam chocolate processed in the best French machines on granite," and Norway's first chocolate factory had thus come to the Norwegian capital. Steam chocolate was also a term used in Europe, often disparagingly by craft-based chocolate producers but taken as a badge of honor by the more industrially optimistic producers such as Krafft; the steam had no effect on the chocolate, being only the driving force in the machines.

=== New factory in Hausmannsgate ===
In 1848 Krafft bought a property by Hausmannsgate from the wholesaler Young. At first the property was used as an outing spot, probably with some cultivation and livestock, but through the 1850s Krafft bought up neighboring sites until he owned the whole area from Torggata to Mariboes gate. Here the new factory building, designed by the architect Jacob Wilhelm Nordan, was erected and established as the headquarters of the business in 1867. The building housed the chocolate factory and machine room on the first floor, with soap and nail factories in the side buildings, while the second and third floors held packing rooms and two workers' apartments, and an external crane was installed for transporting goods.

When Carl Krafft died in 1876, his brother Wilhelm took over the factory, and in the 1890s Wilhelm's son, August Carl Krafft, took over operations. The factory in Hausmannsgate was expanded several times, and August, who had experience from Germany and France, introduced new drops and confectionery products into the range.

=== Closure ===
Wilhelm Krafft died in 1903, and in the following years competition from Freia and the new players Bergene and Asola grew steadily harder. In 1914 both Carl Kraffts Chocoladefabrik and Brødrene Ottesens chocolate factories had to close. In Lakkegata, Kraffts continued producing soap, varnish, and mustard until the 1950s.
