= St. Margaret's Church, Oslo =

Church in Oslo, Norway

Coordinates: 59.995896°N 10.763941°E

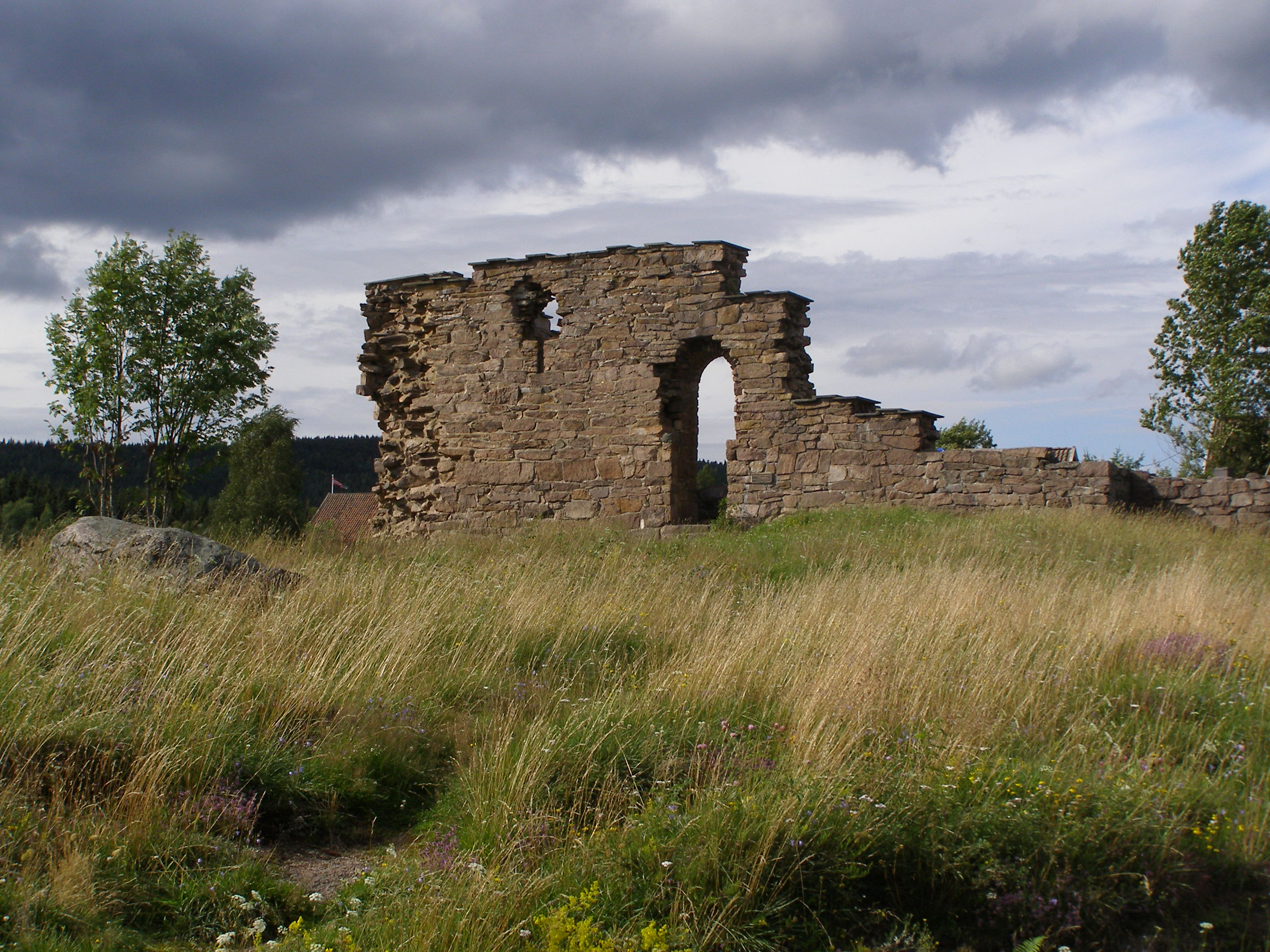
The ruins of St. Margaret's Church in Maridalen

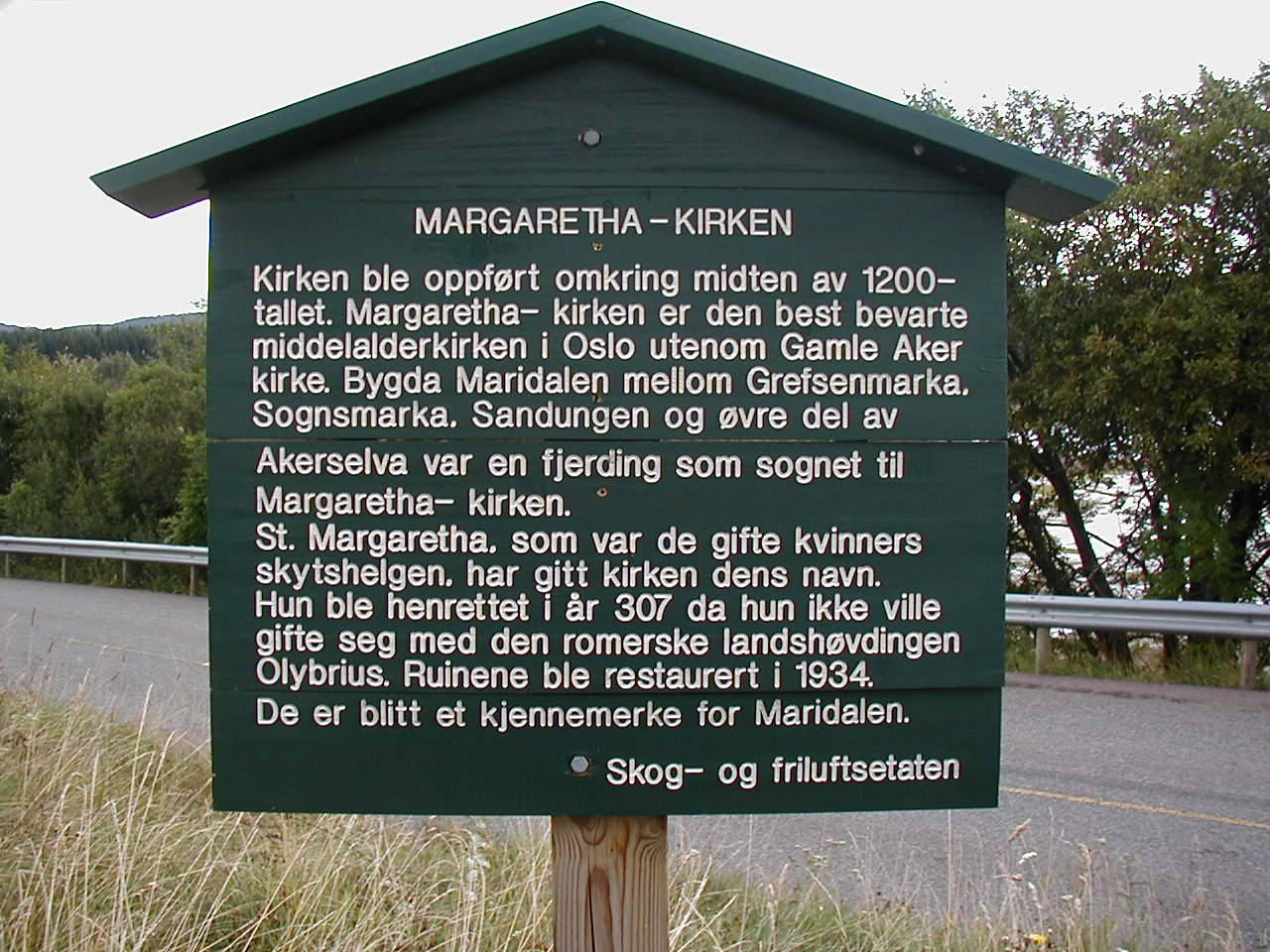
Sign at ruins of St. Margaret's Church

St. Margaret's Church (Norwegian: Margaretakirken) was a medieval stone church located on the outskirts of Oslo, Norway.

The church was built in the 13th century, and is now a ruin. The church is named after Margaret of Antioch. It was located in Maridalen, close to the northern end of lake Maridalsvannet. Architect and archaeologist Gerhard Fischer led the restoration in 1934. Today it is the best preserved medieval building in Oslo next to the Old Aker Church.

== Maridalsspillet ==
"The Maridal Play" (Maridalsspillet) is a trilogy consisting of "Church Builder", "Black Death" and "Church Silver". It was written by Carl Fredrik Engelstad. The historical outdoor play is performed with the remains of Margaret's Church in Maridalen serving as a background. These and several other plays have been performed on site almost annually since 1974.

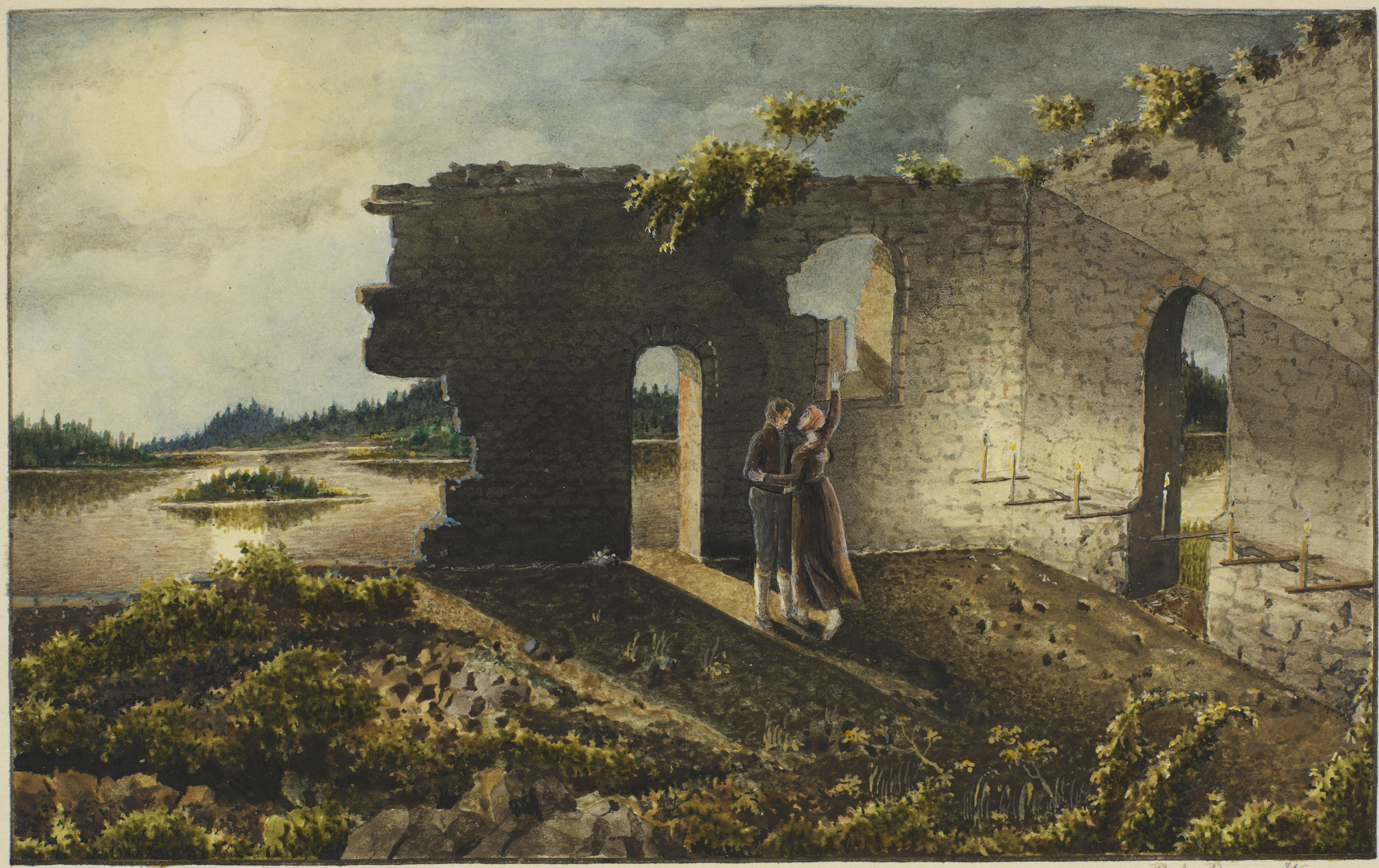
The ruins painted by Peter Andreas Brandt (First half of the 19th century) National Library of Norway
