= Snippen Station =

Railway station in Oslo, Norway

Snippen
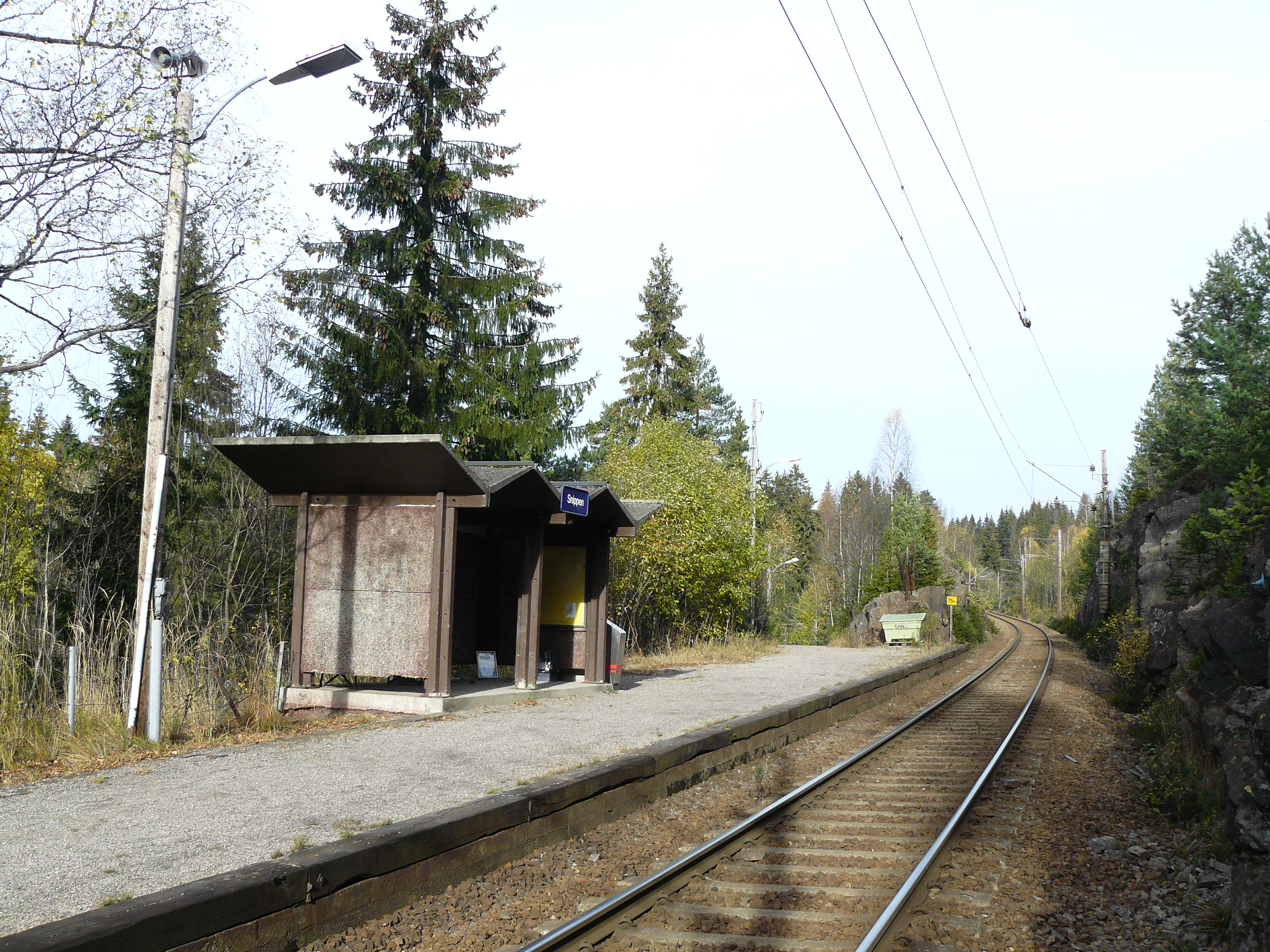

General information
- Location: Snippen, Maridalen, Oslo; Norway
- Coordinates: 60°01′27″N 10°48′36″E
- Owner: Bane NOR
- Operator: Vy Gjøvikbanen
- Line: Gjøvik Line
- Distance: 17.68 km
- Platforms: 1

History
- Opened: 1934
Location

Snippen Station (Norwegian: Snippen stasjon) is an unstaffed stop on the Gjøvik Line with the address Greveveien in Maridalen, Oslo, Norway. The station is located a little over 17.5 km from Oslo Central Station between Sandermosen Station and Movatn Station and was opened in 1934. There is no car parking area in connection with the station.

The station is conveniently located as a starting point for excursions into both Nordmarka and Lillomarka.

Preceding station			Following station
Kjelsås; Sandermosen	Gjøvik Line		Movatn
Preceding station	Local trains		Following station
Kjelsås	R31	Oslo S–Jaren	Movatn
