= Spålen–Katnosa Nature Reserve =

Nature reserve in Norway

Coordinates: 60.1667°N 10.5333°E

- IUCN category Ia (strict nature reserve)
- Interactive map of Spålen–Katnosa Nature Reserve

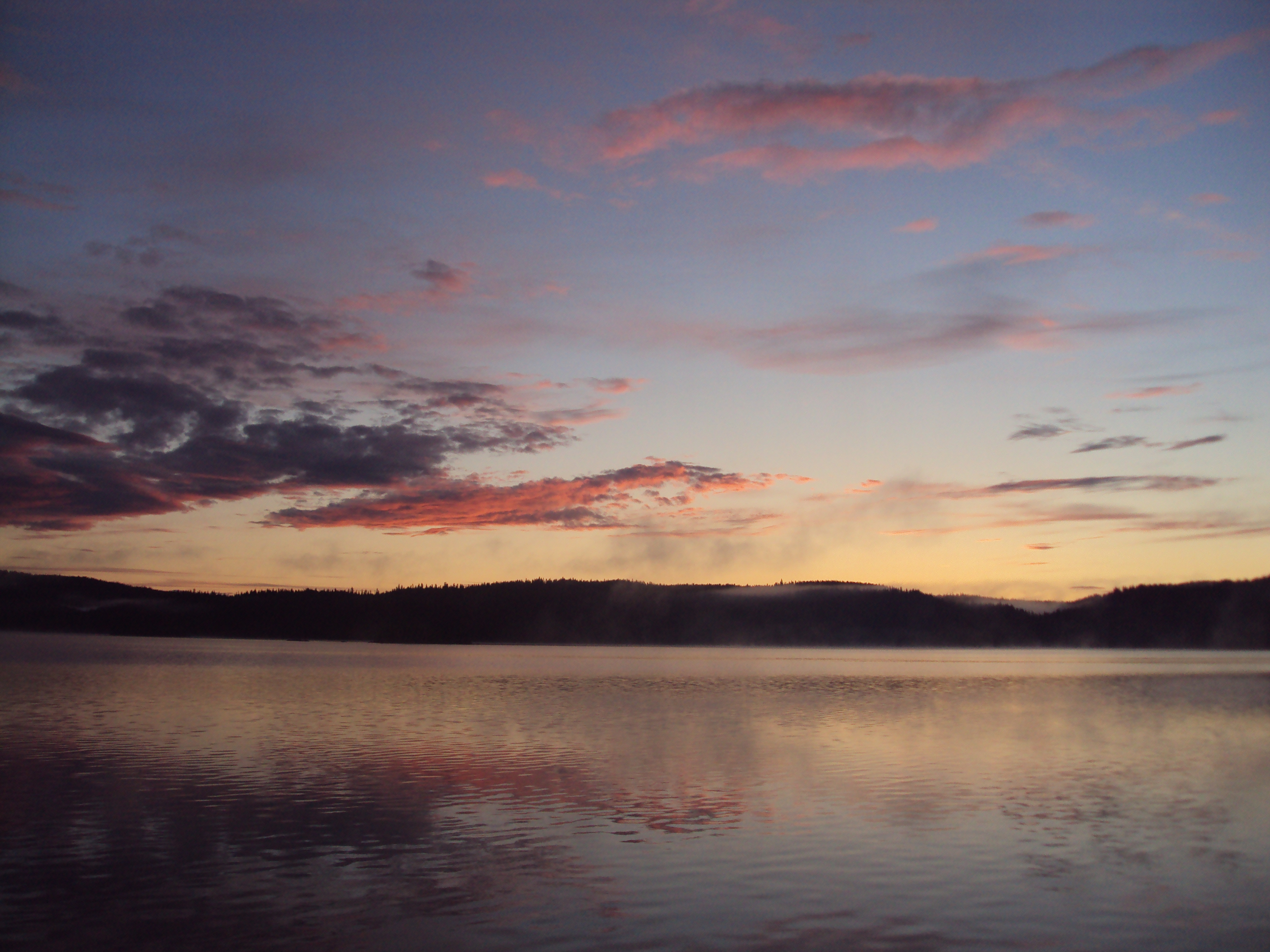
Katnosa

Spålen–Katnosa Nature Reserve is a nature reserve in Nordmarka, Norway.

It was established in 1995 and encompasses portions of the municipalities Lunner and Jevnaker in Akershus and of Ringerike in Buskerud. The area is characterised by forested hills dominated by spruce. The reserve covers an area of 18 km^{2} principally of woods and wetlands, including lake Katnosa.
