= Movatn Station =

Railway station in Norway

Movatn
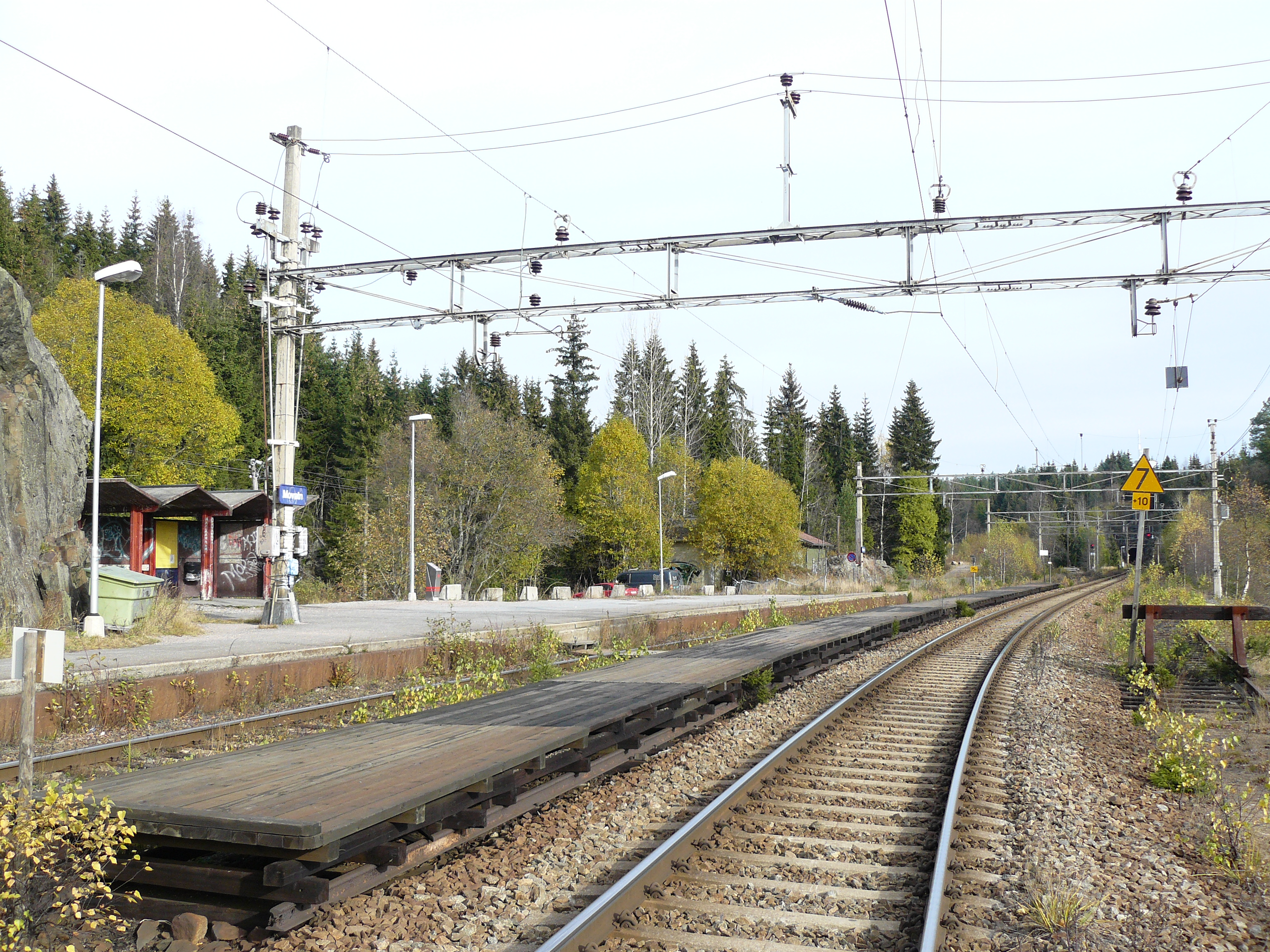

General information
- Location: Movatn, Maridalen, Oslo; Norway
- Coordinates: 60°02′15″N 10°48′46″E
- Elevation: 271.8 m (892 ft)
- Owner: Bane NOR
- Operator: Vy Gjøvikbanen
- Line: Gjøvik Line
- Distance: 19.34 km (12.02 mi)
- Platforms: 2

History
- Opened: 1927; 99 years ago
Location

Movatn Station (Norwegian: Movatn stasjon) is an unstaffed railway station on the Gjøvik Line at Movatn in Maridalen, Oslo, Norway. The station is located about 19 km (12 mi) from Oslo S between Snippen Station and Nittedal Station and was first opened in 1900 as a crossing track, two years ahead of the opening of Gjøvikbanen.

In 1927 the station was upgraded with a station building and converted to a staffed station reserved for passengers and freight. In 1935 Movatn was officially designated a station. The station became remote controlled in 1971, and the following year it became unstaffed. In 1975 the station building was demolished.

The station lies at an altitude of 271.8 m (892 ft) AMSL and has a small shack to protect waiting passengers. It has parking spaces for ten cars.

== Sources ==
- (in English) Entry at Jernbaneverket
- (in Norwegian) Norsk Jernbaneklubb.no (Norwegian Railway Association) – page about Movatn Station

Preceding station			Following station
Snippen	Gjøvik Line		Nittedal
Preceding station	Local trains		Following station
Snippen	R31	Oslo S–Jaren	Nittedal
