= Bjørnsjøen =

Lake in Norway

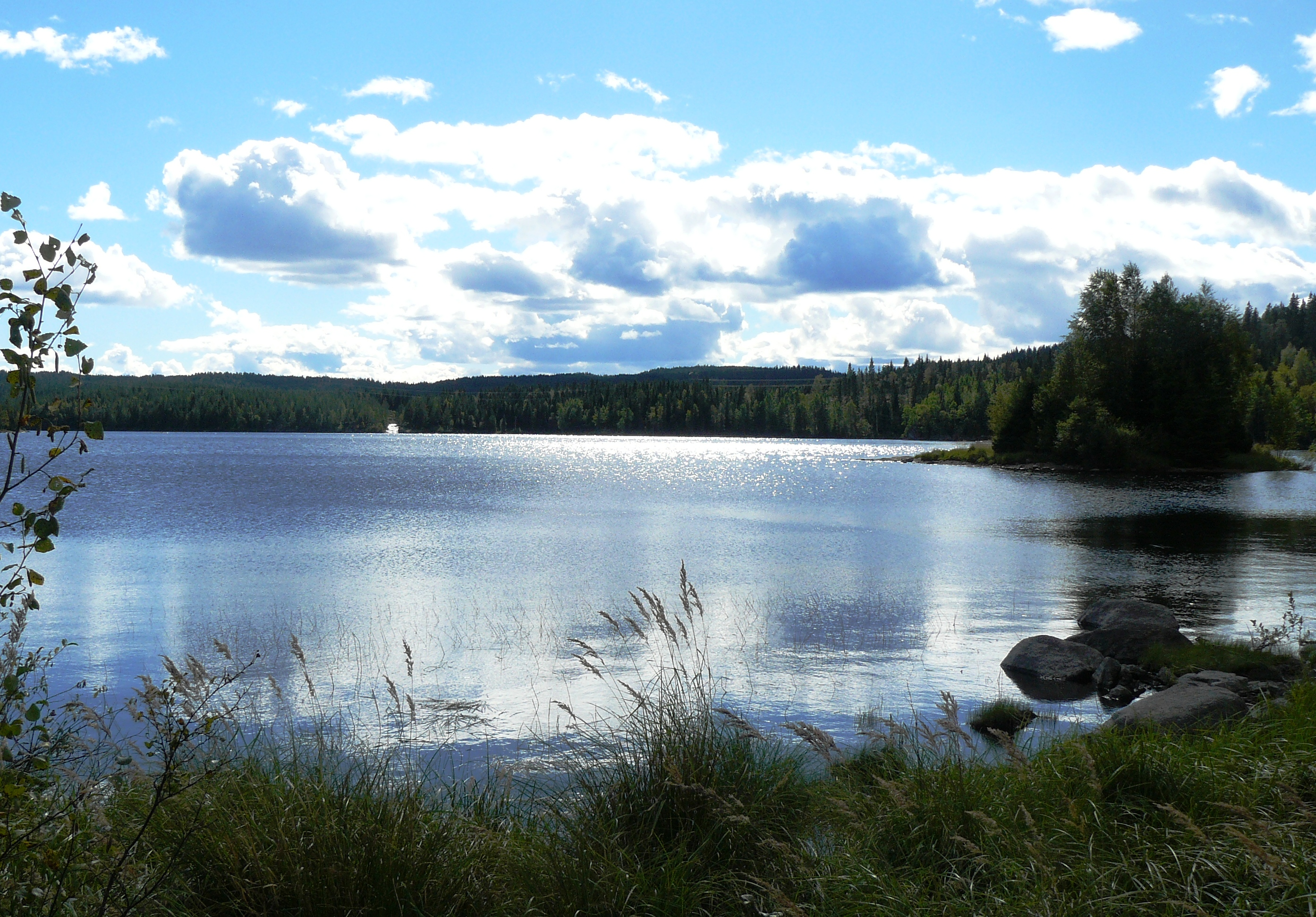
- Bjørnsjøen

- Location within Norway
- Location: Nordmarka, Oslo.
- Coordinates: 60°04′N 10°40′E
- Primary inflows: Hakkloelva
- Primary outflows: Bjørnsjøelva
- Basin countries: Norway
- Surface area: 1.7 km^{2} (0.66 sq mi)
- Surface elevation: 337 m (1,106 ft)

Bjørnsjøen is a lake in Nordmarka in Oslo, Norway. The cabin Kikutstua, owned by the Association for the Promotion of Skiing, is located at the northeastern shore of the lake. Asbjørnsen's story "En Nat i Nordmarken" is set at Bjørnsjøen.

Bjørnsjøen drains through the river Bjørnsjøelva to the lake Skjærsjøen.

== Gallery ==
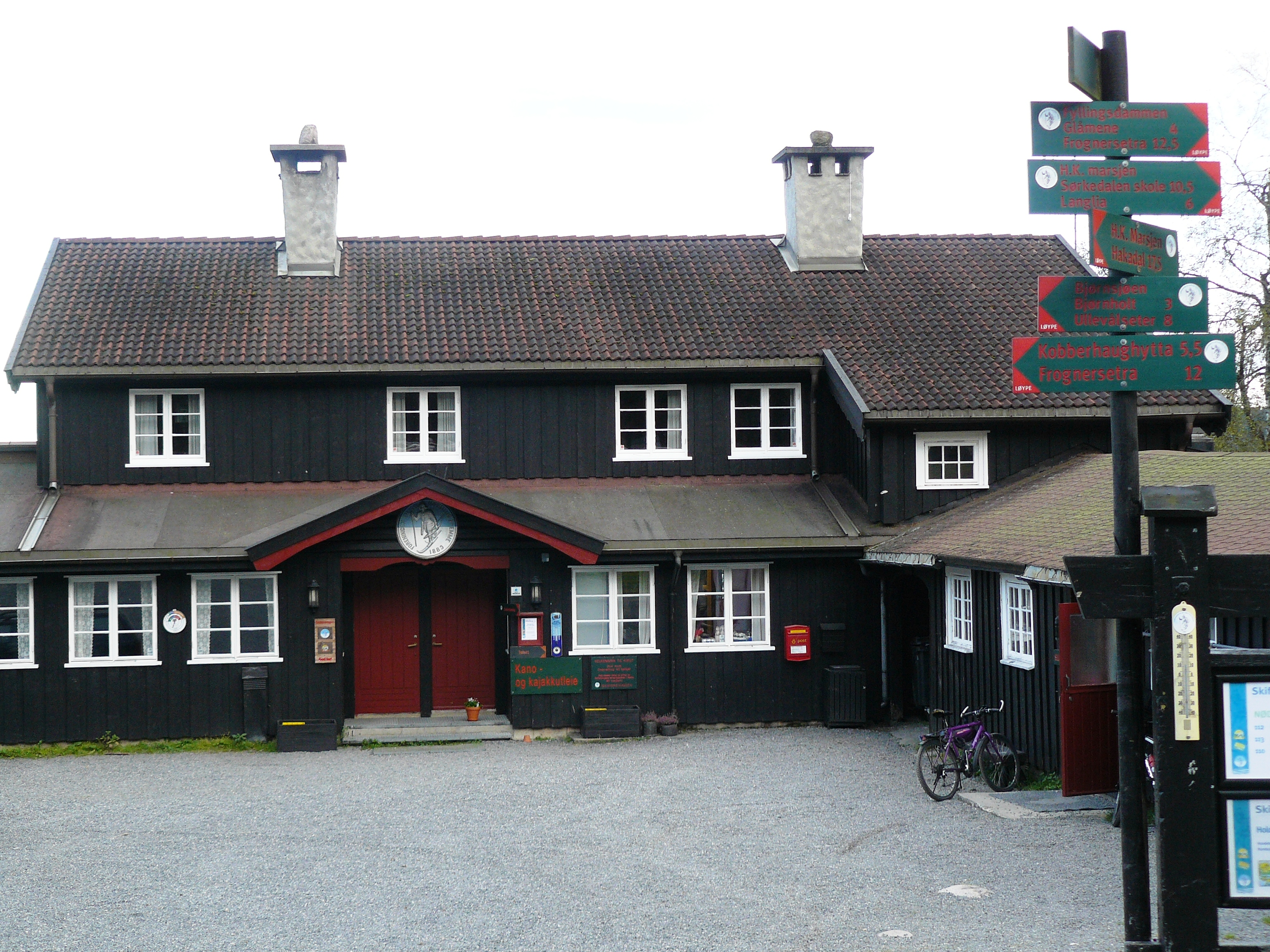
Skiforeningen's cabin Kikutstua is located near Bjørnsjøen

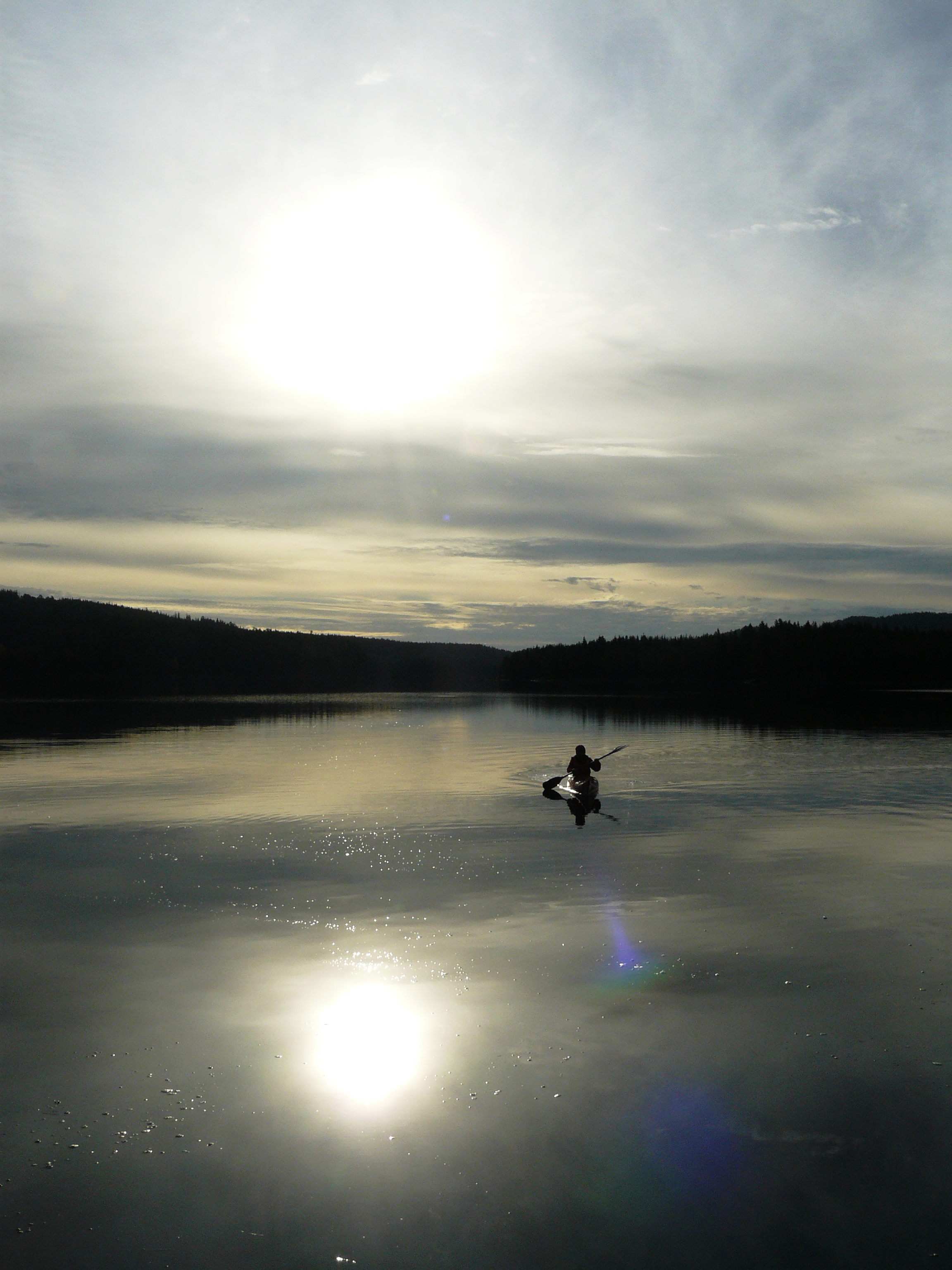
Canoeing on Bjørnsjøen
