= Hammeren Hydroelectric Power Station =

Hydroelectric power station in Norway

Hammeren Power Station
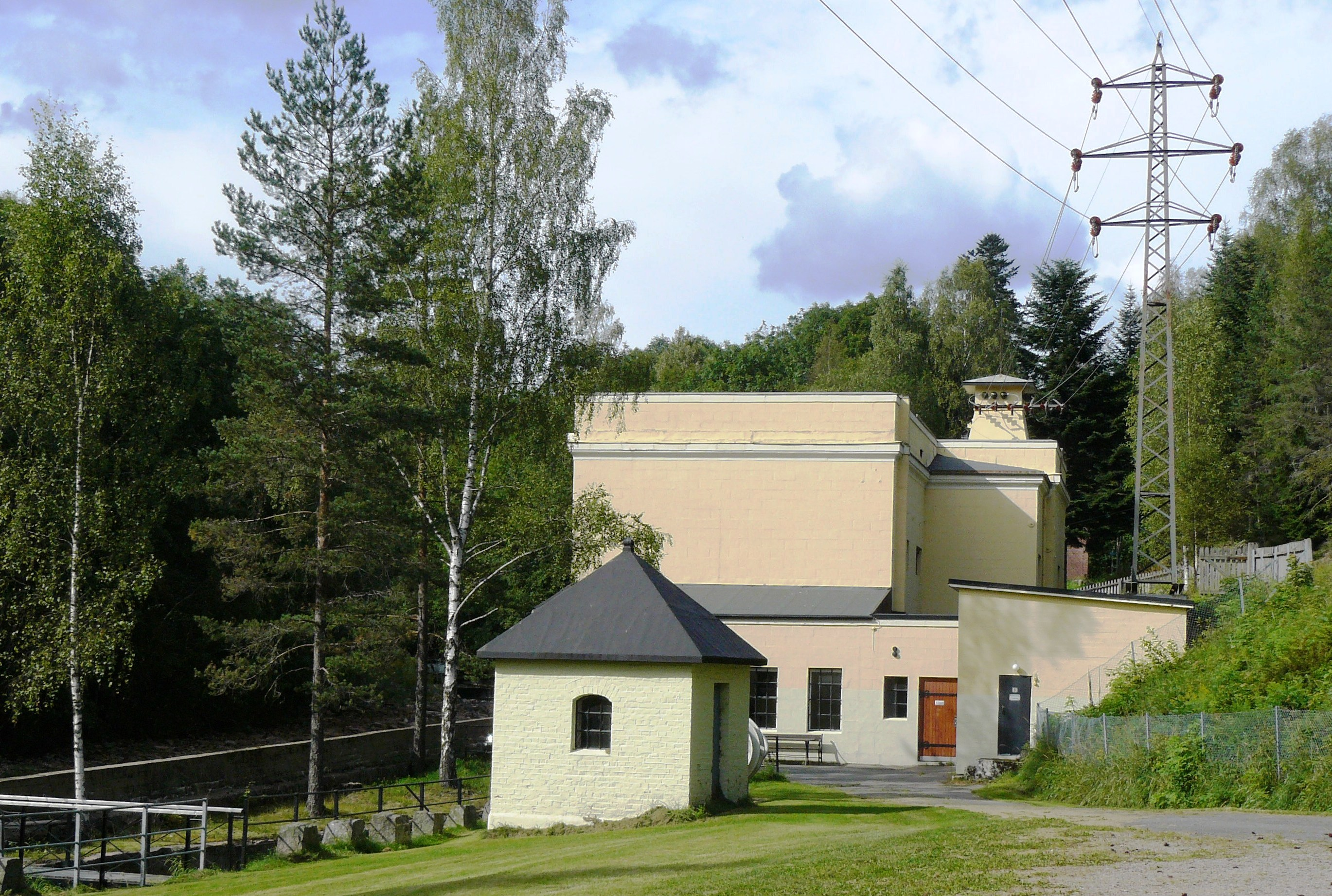
- Official name: Hammeren kraftstasjon
- Country: Norway
- Location: Oslo
- Coordinates: 59°59′48″N 10°45′00″E
- Status: Operational
- Opening date: 1900; 125 years ago
- Owner(s): E-CO Vannkraft AS

Upper reservoir
- Creates: Skjærsjøen

Lower reservoir
- Creates: Maridalsvannet

Power Station
- Hydraulic head: 105 m
- Turbines: 1 × 5.6 MW
- Installed capacity: 5.6 MW
- Capacity factor: 32.6%
- Annual generation: 16 GW·h

Hammeren Hydroelectric Power Station (Norwegian: Hammeren kraftstasjon) is a hydroelectric power station located in Oslo, Norway. It is the only power station in Oslo, and among the oldest power stations still running in Norway. It has a total installed capacity of 5 MWp, and an annual production of 16 GWh. The power station utilises the waterfalls from Skjærsjøen to Maridalsvannet, with a total height of 105 m. It was established in 1900 by the company Christiania Elektricitetsværk, originally with four generator units, and increased to six units in 1901. In 1927, the six generators were replaced by a single 5.6 MW unit.
