= Kjelsås station =

Railway station in Oslo, Norway

Kjelsås
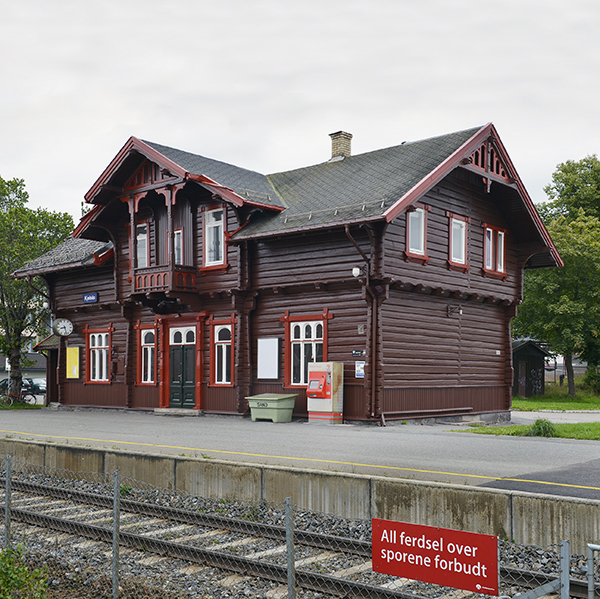
- Kjelsås Station

General information
- Location: Kjelsås, Oslo; Norway
- Coordinates: 59°57′58″N 10°46′58″E
- Elevation: 155.6 m (510 ft) asl
- Owner: Bane NOR
- Operator: Vy Gjøvikbanen
- Line: Gjøvik Line
- Distance: 10.28 km (6.39 mi)
- Platforms: 2
- Connections: Tram: Kjelsås Line; Bus: 25, 54

Construction
- Architect: Paul Due

Other information
- Fare zone: 1

History
- Opened: 1900
Location

Kjelsås Station (Norwegian: Kjelsås stasjon) is located at Kjelsås in Oslo, Norway on the Gjøvik Line. The railway station is located 10.28 km (6.39 mi) from Oslo Central Station between Nydalen Station and Snippen Station at 155.6 meters (510 ft) above sea level and was opened in 1900, two years before the railway to Gjøvik was finished.

The station is served by commuter and regional trains operated by Vy Gjøvikbanen. There is a tram and bus stop at the station. The station is located beside the Norwegian Museum of Science and Technology.

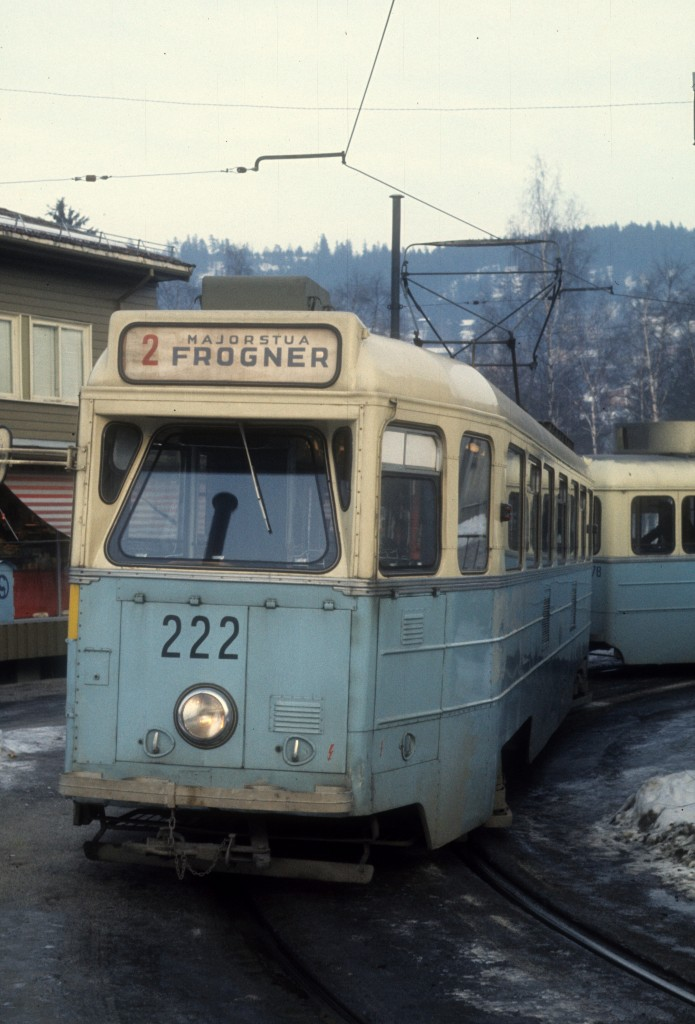
A SM53 tram on the balloon loop.

== Kjelsås tram stop ==
Kjelsås
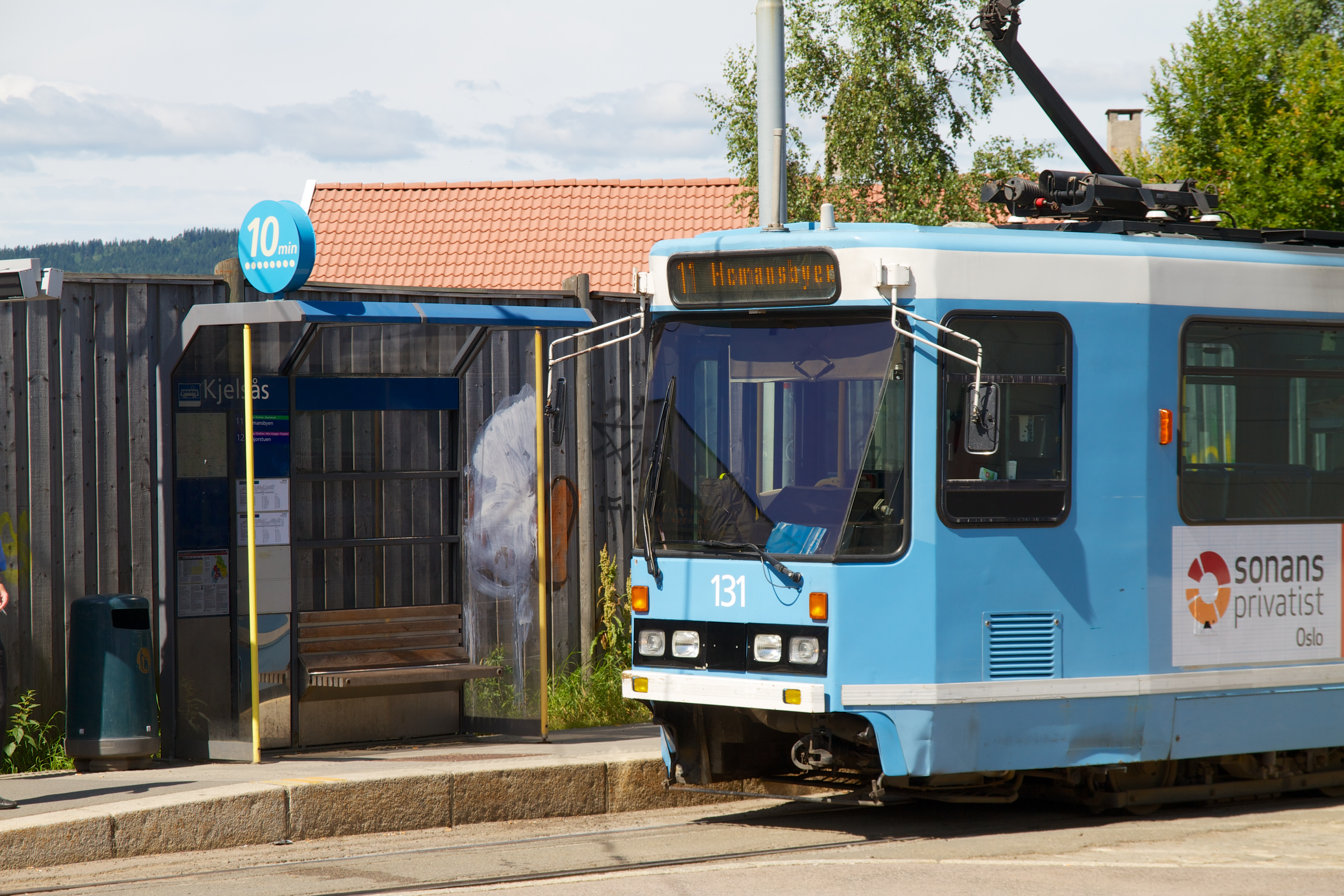
- A SL79 Tram at Kjelsås in 2014

General information
- Owner: Sporveien
- Operator: Ruter

Services
Preceding station	Trams in Oslo	Following station
Kjelsåsalleen towards Majorstuen	Line 11	Terminus
Kjelsåsalleen towards Majorstuen	Line 12	Terminus
Route map
Location

Kjelsås is also the name of a tram stop and it is the terminus of the Kjelsås Line. It is served by line 11 and 12 using the older SL79 high-floor trams. It has a balloon loop. It was opened on the 25 of September, 1934 along with the rest of the Kjelsås Line. Kjelsås was closed for two years along with the rest of the Kjelsås Line from 2002 until 2004 after local protest. In the 2010s, the Kjelsås Line was upgraded as part of the Fremtidens Byreise programme (this brings 87 new trams to Oslo). The balloon loop surrounds a former depot that was taken out of use in 1957, when the Grefsen depot was established. The depot was designed by Carl Vorbeck and it could hold 4-5 carriages within it. It is now in use as a cultural centre.

Preceding station			Following station
Nydalen	Gjøvik Line		Snippen; Sandermosen
Preceding station	Regional trains		Following station
Nydalen	RE30	Oslo S–Gjøvik	Nittedal
Preceding station	Local trains		Following station
Nydalen	R31	Oslo S–Jaren	Snippen
