= Maridalsvannet =

Lake in Oslo, Norway

Coordinates: 59°59′N 10°47′E

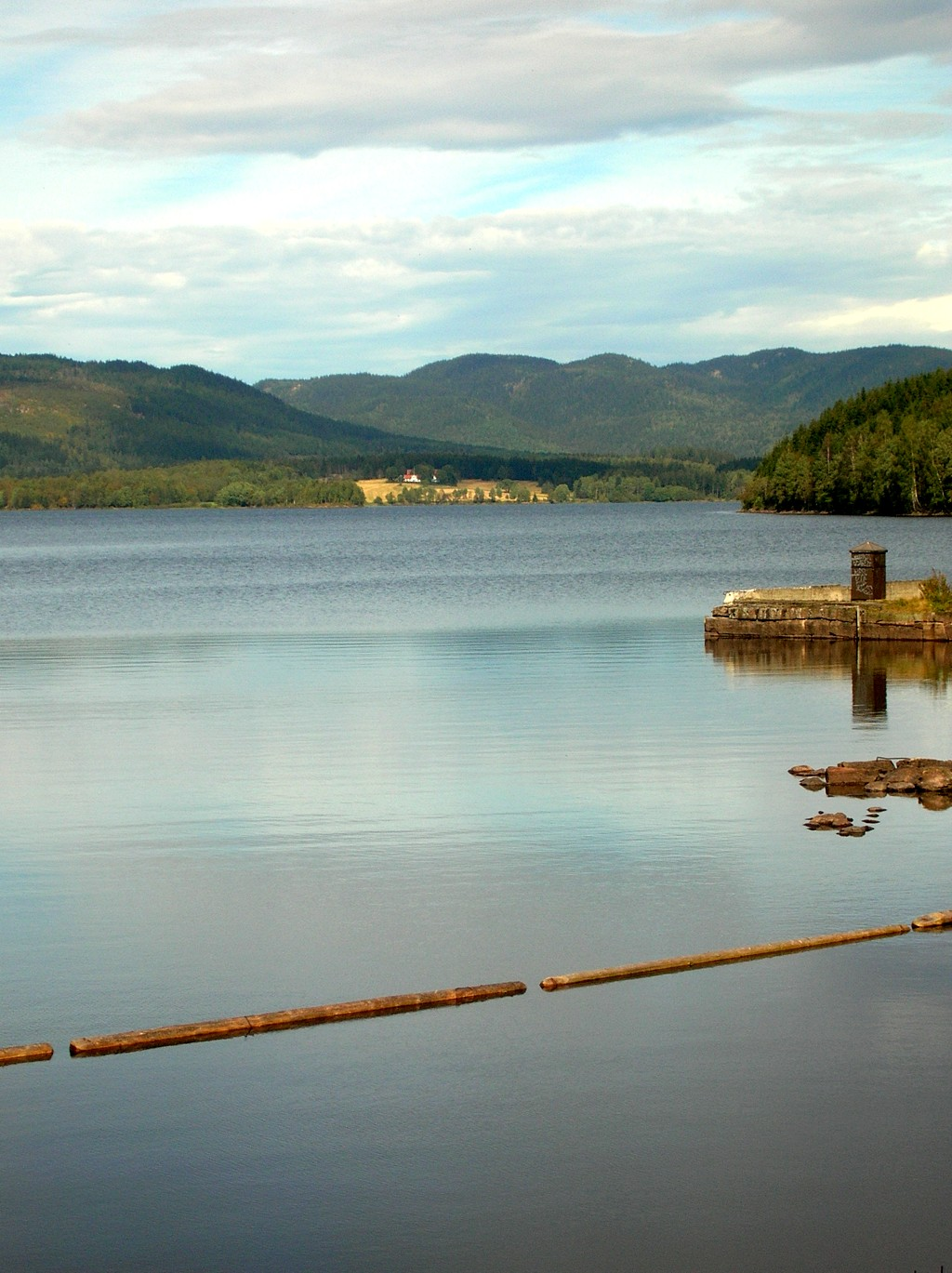
- Maridalsvannet

- Location within Oslo
- Location: Maridalen, Oslo
- Primary inflows: Skjærsjøelva and Dausjøelva
- Primary outflows: Akerselva
- Basin countries: Norway
- Surface area: 3.83 km^{2} (1.48 sq mi)
- Surface elevation: 149 m (489 ft)

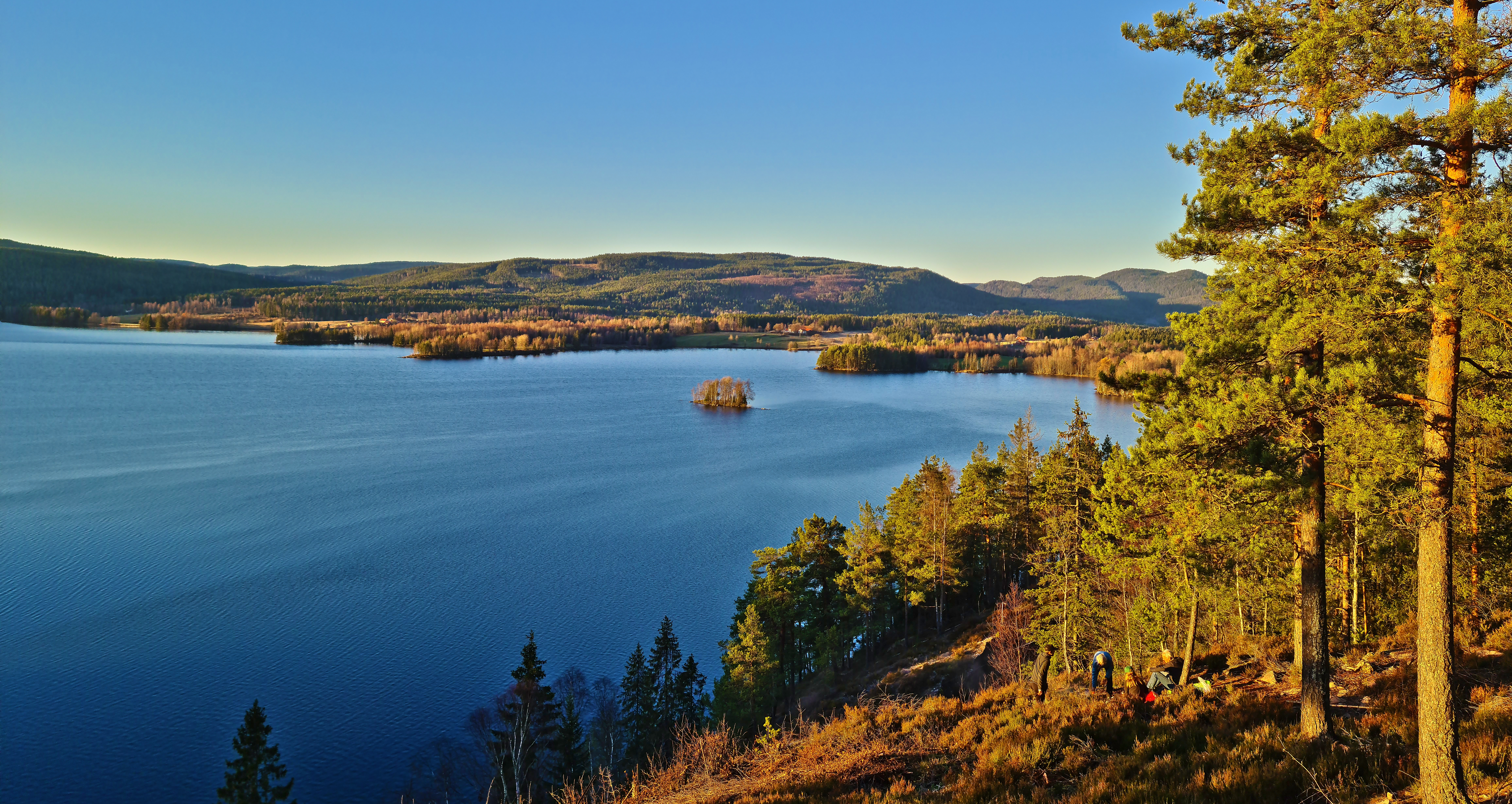
Maridalsvannet and Maridalen

Maridalsvannet (English: Lake Maridal) is a lake in Maridalen, Oslo, Norway. It is the largest lake in the municipality of Oslo, serving as its primary drinking water supply. The lake drains via the river Akerselva to the Oslofjord. The primary inflows are Skjærsjøelva and Dausjøelva. The Hammeren Hydroelectric Power Station exploits the fall from Skjærsjøen to Maridalsvannet.

The shores of the lake and substantial areas of woods and fields around it are owned by the city of Oslo to protect the water supply. Some farms are still operated under city supervision, but others were closed down in the mid-20th century; their remains are marked by historical signs. Hiking, cycling, and cross-country ski trails run near the south side of the lake and connect to the system of trails in the forests that surround Oslo. They can be reached by a short walk from the Kjelsås tram, bus, or train stations. Trails run alongside Akerselva from the Marridalsvannet dam to near the Oslofjord. The Gjøvik Line runs along the same shore.
