= Skjærsjøen =

Lake in Oslo, Norway

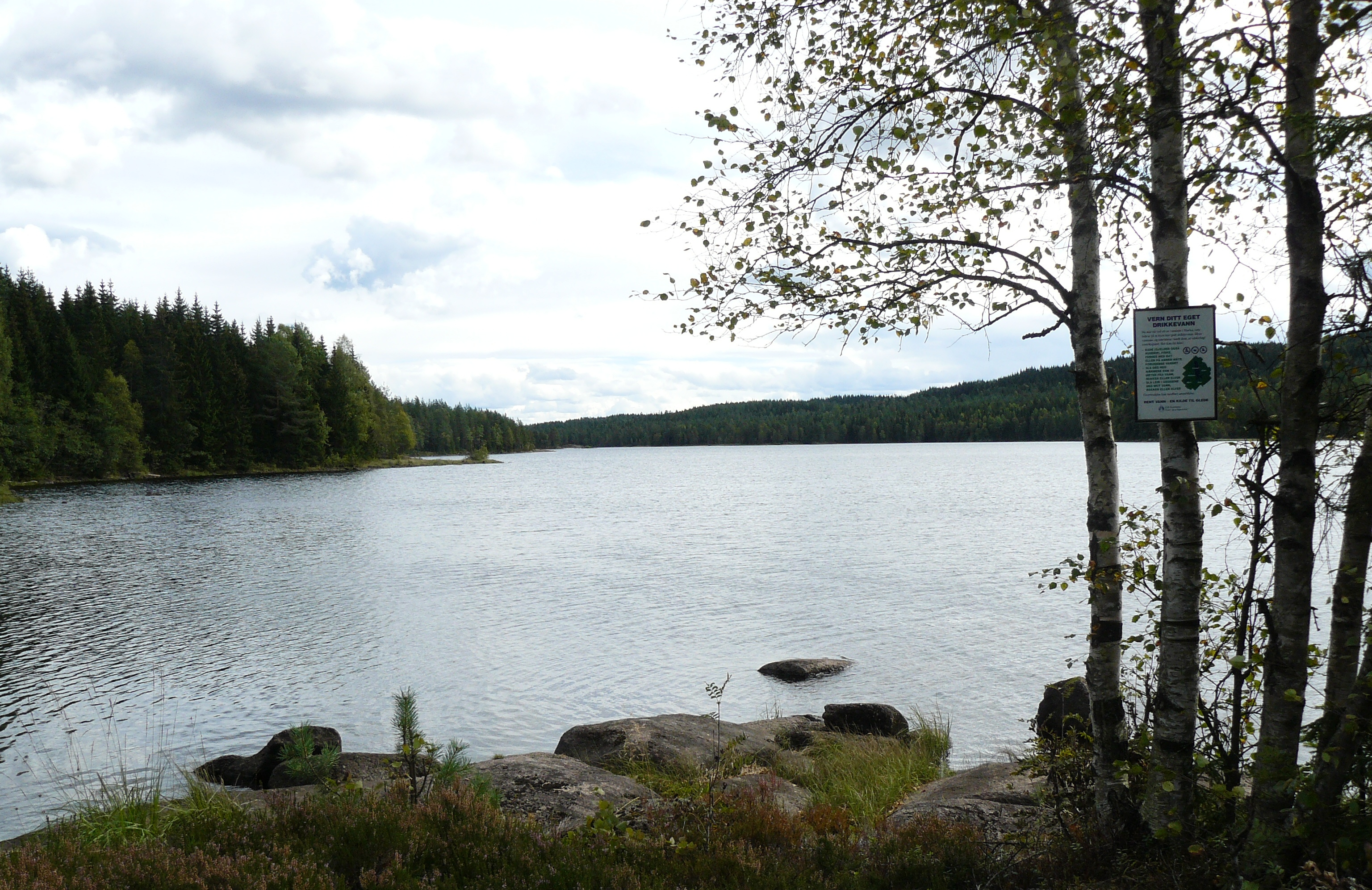
- Skjærsjøen

- Location within Norway
- Location: Nordmarka, Oslo
- Coordinates: 60°01′17.5″N 10°42′35.1″E
- Primary outflows: Skjærsjøelva
- Basin countries: Norway
- Surface area: 70 ha (170 acres)
- Surface elevation: 258 m (846 ft)

Skjærsjøen is a regulated lake in Nordmarka, Oslo, Norway. It drains through the river Skjærsjøelva to Maridalsvannet, and also via pipe to the Hammeren Hydroelectric Power Station. It is regulated by the dam Skjærsjødammen built in 1890.
