= Sagene Line =

Former tram line in Oslo, Norway

Coordinates: 59°54′50″N 10°44′33″E

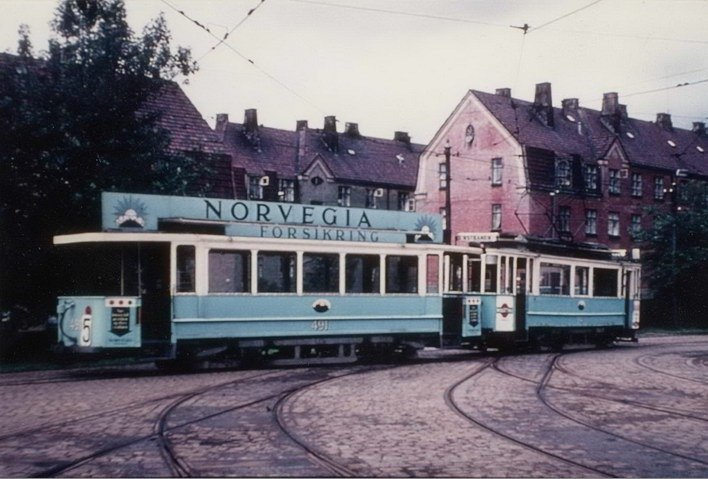

Overview
- Status: Closed
- Termini: Treschows gate; Kirkegata

Service
- Type: Tramway
- System: Oslo Tramway
- Operator(s): Oslo Sporveier

History
- Opened: 24 November 1899
- Closed: 4 April 1998

Technical
- Number of tracks: Double track
- Character: Tramway
- Track gauge: 1,435 mm (4 ft 8 1/2 in)
- Electrification: 600 V DC

The Sagene Line (Bokmål: Sagenelinjen) is a former line of the Oslo Tramway in Norway. It ran from Stortorvet in the city center along Akersgata and Ullevålsveien through the neighborhood of St. Hanshaugen. It then continued along Colletts gate, Geitmyrsveien and Kierschouws gate to Sagene. At Sagene Church it had a regulation stop and access to Sagene Depot. The line continued along Bentsebrugata to Torshov, where it intersected with the Grünerløkka–Torshov Line.

The line was the first tramway opened by Kristiania Kommunale Sporveie (KKS), on 24 November 1899. Originally the line ran from Athenæum to Sagene Church. The company and the line were taken over by Kristiania Sporveisselskab (KSS) in 1905. The line was expanded on 28 December 1914 with the connection to Torshov. From 1915 Sagene was served by Sagene Ring, a circle line service which combined the Sagene Line with the Grünerløkka–Torshov Line. Operations were taken over by Oslo Sporveier in 1924. From that year until 1949 there was a branch line from Bentsebrugata, the Korsvoll Line. Services on the Sagene Ring terminated in 1957. As part of a planned closing of the tramway, the Sinsen Line from Stortorvet to Sagene was closed in 1966. Services remained from Sagene to Torshov until 1998.

== Route ==
Sagene Ring started downtown at Athenæum in Akersgata, near the Parliament of Norway Building. It through Karl Johans gate and then headed northwards into the neighborhoods of St. Hanshaugen and Sagene. It ran along Ullevålsveien, Colletts gate, Geitemyrsveien and Kierschouws gate. This section had a length of 3.5 kilometers (2.2 mi) in 1905. It then continued through a loop near Sagene Church, where there was a connection to Sagene Depot, along Bentesebrugata, over Bentse Bridge to Torshov. There is connected to the Grünerløkka–Torshov Line. There was also a branch, the Korsvoll Line, which ran from Bentsebrugata along Advokat Dehlis plass and Bergensgata to Lisa Kristoffersens plass.

Sagene Depot was built as the administrative and technical headquarters of KKS. In its original configuration the brick building featured place for 36 trams and a workshop on its ground floor and offices in the upper story. Later a second hall was built.

== History ==
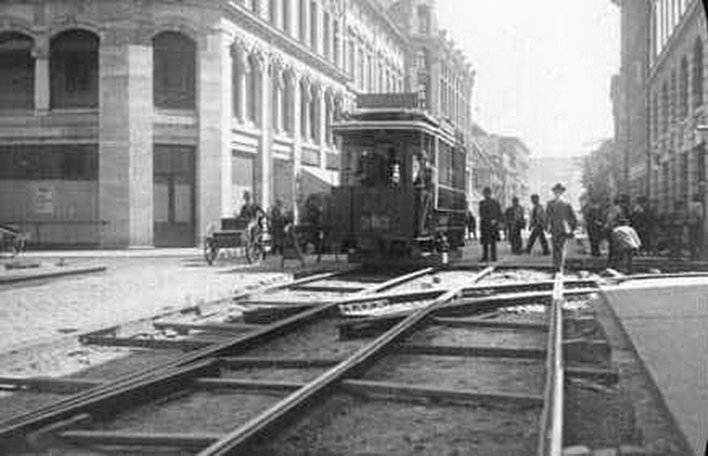
Laying of tracks of in Akersgata

Kristiania Sporveisselskap applied in 1897 to build an electric tramway to Sagene. This was at the time the largest neighborhood of Oslo (then known as Kristiania) without a tram service. The application was rejected by the municipal council. There had been a political debate going on regarding if the municipality itself should operated the tramway. By 1897 the Liberal Party had received a majority in the municipal council, allowing them on 23 September 1897 to establish their own tramway, Kristiania Kommunale Sporveie, which they armed with the task of building a 3.5-kilometer (2.2 mi) line to Sagene. Two city engineers were sent on a study tour of Germany and the Netherlands to gain experience from tram operations there. It was soon given the task to also build the Rodeløkka Line and the Vippetangen Line.

Construction of the Sagene Line commenced in early 1899. Although originally stipulated to open in August, this was delayed until 24 November, when revenue operation started. Initially there was not more power available than allowed a ten-minute headway with the Class S trams. Once additional power supply had been secured, the headway was cut to five minutes. To begin with services altered between running the full length to Sagene or just the southern part of St. Hanshaugen. In the city center they terminated at Athenæum. From 1900 an agreement was reached with KES, allowing the Sagene services to continue along its tracks to Jernbanetorget. The services from St. Hanshaugen were run onwards along the Vippetangen Line.

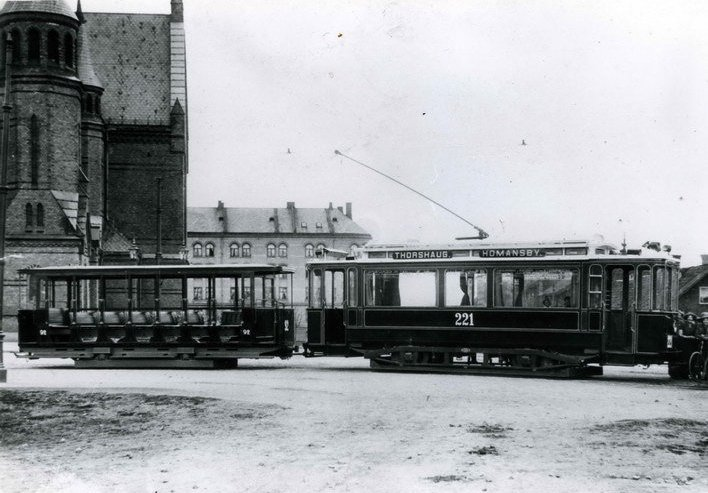
KSS tram at Sagene Church in 1912

The company's manager proposed that the Sagene Line be extended from Sagene Church through Arendalsgaten, across Bentse Bridge and Hegermannsgate to Vogts gate and terminate at Grefsen Station. This would cost half a million Norwegian krone. The project was not supported by the politicians and instead KSS extended its Grünerløkka–Torshov Line to Grefsen Station.

The routes were changed in 1902, so the Sagene services connected to the Rodeløkka Line and the St. Hanshaugen services connected to the Vippetangen Line. KKS was sold to KSS on 6 October 1905, who took over services on the Sagene Line. They rerouted the services and at first tied the Sagene services to the Kampen Line. Lines were numbered in 1910. Thus the Sagene service was linked with the Vålerenga Line and numbered 8, while the St. Hanshaugen was tied to the Rodeløkka Line and numbered 9. This was reorganized two years later, when line 9 was removed and all services ran to Sagene.

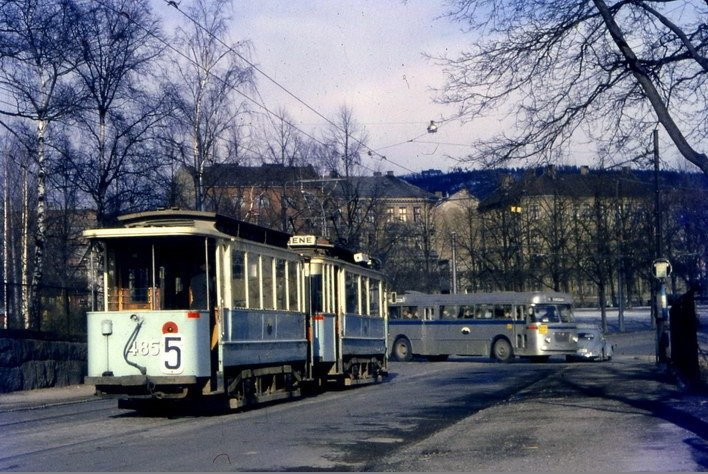
Class SS tram the intersection of Kierschows gate and Uelands gate in 1966, months before that part of the line closed

On 28 December 1914 the Sagene Line was extended via Bentse Bridge to Torshov, where it intersected with the Grünerløkka–Torshov Line. This allowed KSS to start a circle service, which it named Sagene Ring and numbered 0. It initially used white signs for the counter-clockwise inside ring and green signs for the clockwise outer circle. Thus the service would run along the Sagene Line and then connect down along the Grünerløkka–Torshov Line. The headway was set to five minutes, which required eight trams per direction. At Sagene they took a five-minute break, and as long as they were on time passengers could transfer to the next tram and save the break.

Line 0 was terminated on 3 August 1915, and the Sagene Line was instead served by lines 7 and 8 in a pigtail loop: Homansbyen–Torshov–Sagene–Stortorvet–Vålerenga. Line 0 resumed on 24 February 1916, although the headway rose to six minutes. It increased further to eight minutes on 25 March 1920. KSS merged in 1924 and the service was taken over by Oslo Sporveier. They gradually cut the frequency to twelves minute-headways.

The Korsvoll Line opened on 4 May 1924. Services to it followed the Grünerløkka–Torshov Line, branched onto the Sagene Line at Torshov and followed it Bentsebrugata. The Korsvoll Line was served every fifteen minutes by Line 10.

Summer routes were introduced in 1932, cutting Sagene Ring's headway to fifteen minutes. Including slack a full round on the circle took 35 minutes. During a twelve-minute headway this went fine with three trams in each direction. The route could be done in 30 minutes, but without any slack. Oslo Sporveier ran the line with two trams per direction during the fifteen-minute headway services, but it was often difficult to keep the schedule with this scheme. During the summers 0 was combined with 13 so each service would run twice around the circle and then run on the Gamlebyen Line. From 1937 the reduced service and 0 and 13 combination was also run on Sundays. From 1940 line 13 was moved to the Sinsen Line.

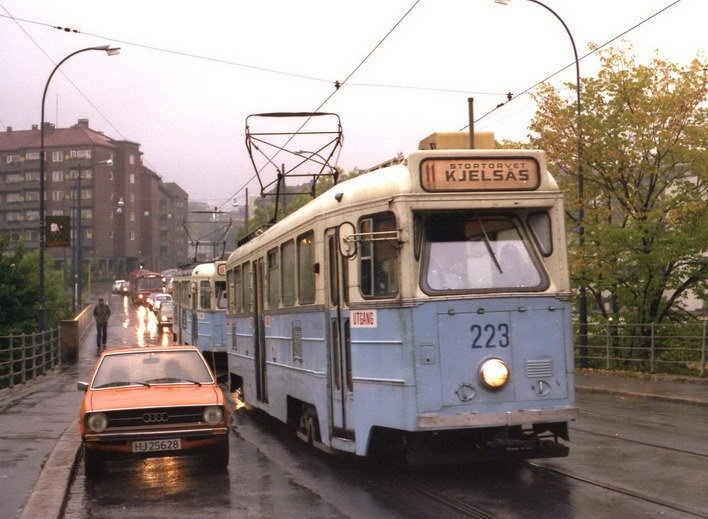
SM53 tram on the line in 1978

The northern track through Arne Garborgs plass was moved to allow the installation of a roundabout in 1941, lengthening the line by 6 meters (20 ft). The tracks were rerouted at two places in 1947. The first, from 6 to 16 July, moved the tracks from Sannergata to Birkelunden. The second, which took effect on 19 October, saw new tracks through Grensen between Stortorvet and Akersgata in the city center. The line until then passed through a narrow part of Akersgata, where there was not sufficient width for two trams to meet. The curve was also so sharp that the motormen could not see an on-coming tram. Therefore, a guard had to be posted at the curve.

This changes made it possible to use the wider 2.5-meter (8 ft 2 in) trams on the route. This allowed Oslo Sporveier to start using Gullfisk trams on the route when it was combined with 13. This started with on 6 February, the same day the Korsvoll Line was closed. The reduced headway was introduced after 19 hours on weekdays from 18 August. Gullfisk remained on the line until 13 April 1952.

The first SM53 trams were introduced from 11 November 1952 when this line was paired with 13. The pairing terminated on 5 July 1953 and SM-53-trams were no longer used on the service. A series of route changes were carried out in 1953 and 1953, whereby 0 was combined with various other lines, and parts of Sagene Ring were served by lines 8 and 13. From 1955 Gullfisk and SM-53 were again used on the Sinsen Line. Services with line number 0 terminated on 28 April 1957. Services continued as line 5. Sagene Depot remained an important workshop until 1957. At that time it was degraded and only used to store reserve trams. From 1966 it was only used to store units taken out of service and maintenance of way stock.

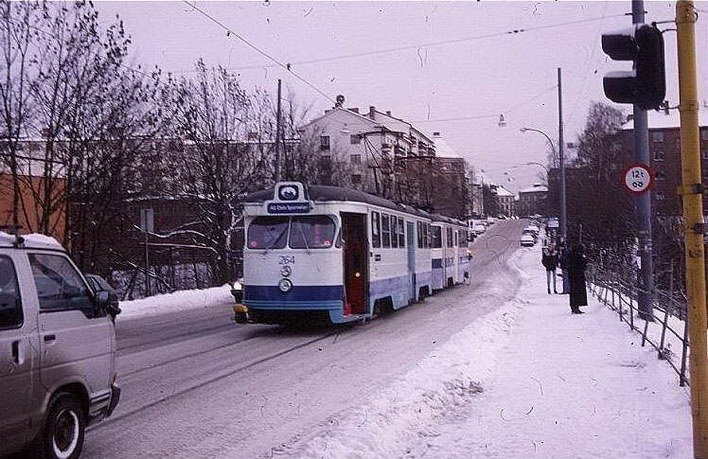
SM91 tram on the line on 4 February 1998—two months before the line was closed

The municipal council voted in 1960 to close all the street trams in Oslo. The Oslo Metro was being built and trams were seen as unmodern compared to diesel buses. The tramway had the nearly new SM53 trams in operation and therefore it was found economical to keep many of the lines running until the rolling stock was obsolete. However, all the old twin-axled trams were to be retired. The Sagene Line was one of several that was closed as part of this process. The closing took place on 17 October 1966, the same day as the metro's Grorud Line opened. However, the segment from Sagene to Torshov was kept.

Sagene was made part of line 10 on 9 January 1989. This was a rush-hour only service which continued to Skøyen. The depot was sold in 1994, and has been converted into a cultural and commercial center. Services on the last part of the line ran for the last time on 4 April 1998. The line was instead run to Grefsen Station.

== Bibliography ==
- Aspenberg, Nils Carl (1994). Trikker og forstadsbaner i Oslo (in Norwegian). Oslo: Baneforlaget. ISBN 82-91448-03-5.
- Fasting, Kåre (1975). Sporveier i Oslo gjennom 100 år: 1875–1975 (in Norwegian). Oslo: Grøhdal & Søn. ISBN 82-504-0116-6.
- Fristad, Hans Andreas (1990). Oslo-trikken – storbysjel på skinner (in Norwegian). Oslo: Gyldendal. ISBN 82-05-19084-4.
- Hartmann, Eivind; Mangset, Øistein (2001). Neste stopp!: Verneplan for bygninger (in Norwegian). Oslo: Baneforlaget. p. 68. ISBN 82-91448-17-5.
