= Korsvoll Line =

Former tram line in Oslo, Norway

Korsvoll
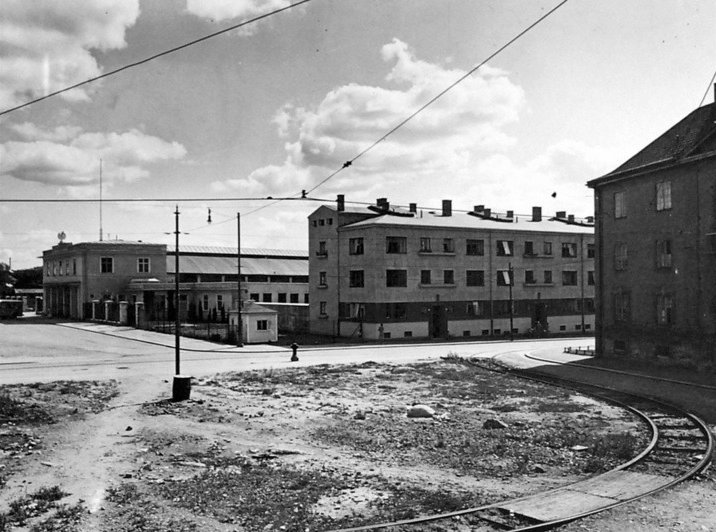
- Balloon loop of the Korsvoll Line at Lisa Kristoffersens plass. In the background the bus garage.

Overview
- Status: Abandoned
- Termini: Bentsegata at Bentse Bridge; Lisa Kristoffersens plass

Service
- Type: Tramway
- System: Oslo Tramway
- Operator(s): Oslo Sporveier

History
- Opened: 1 May 1924
- Closed: 17 January 1949

Technical
- Number of tracks: Double track
- Character: Tramway
- Track gauge: 1,435 mm (4 ft 8 1/2 in)
- Electrification: 600 V DC

The Korsvoll Line (Bokmål: Korsvollinjen) is a former line of the Oslo Tramway in Norway. The line branched off from the Sagene Line at Bentsebrugata and ran along Bergensgata to Lisa Kristoffersens plass in Korsvoll, Oslo. The line opened on 1 May 1924 and was operated by Oslo Sporveier. From 1927 it became part of Line 10, which it remained part of until its closing on 17 January 1949. The reason for closing the line was that it was amongst the least trafficked lines of the tramway and Oslo Sporveier wanted to convert it to a trolleybus line.

== Route ==
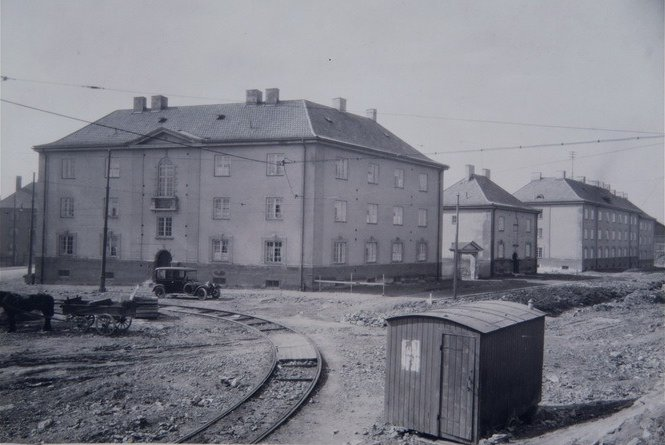
Balloon loop at Lisa Kristoffersen plass

The Korsvoll Line branched off from the Sagene Line at Bentsebrugata. It continued along Advokat Dehlis plass and Bergensgata to Lisa Kristoffersens plass. Services on the line continued from Bentsebrugata to Torshov, from where they followed the Grünerløkka–Torshov Line to the city center.

== History ==
Kristiania Sporveisselskab started the construction of the Korsvoll Line in 1923. However, by the time the line was opened on 1 May 1924 the company had merged and been municipalized to create Oslo Sporveier. Thus it was the first line opened by Oslo Sporveier.

On 29 May 1927 Oslo Sporveier rearranged its routing, allocating line 10 to the Korsvoll Line. Korsvoll was connected to the city center at Stortorvet and continued along the Vestbanen Line to Skillebekk. On weekends it was extended to Skøyen. The route was run every fifteen minutes. From 18 February 1940 the western connection was changed and it ran along the Ullevål Hageby Line instead. Most of the services were provided with Class H trams with two trailers.

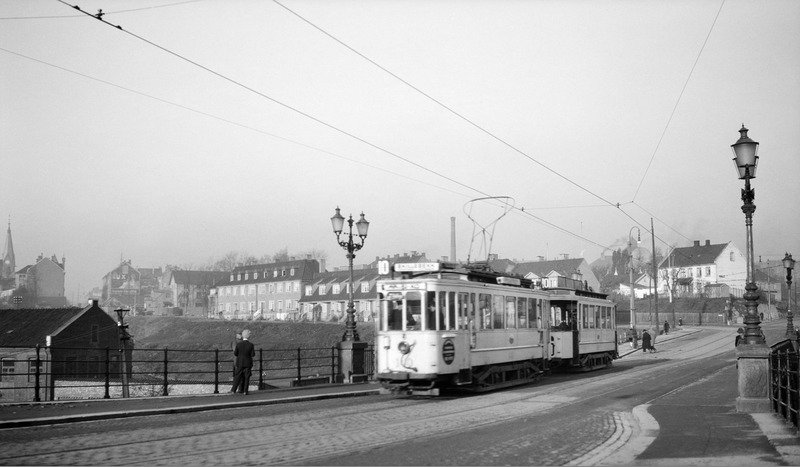
Class SS tram in Bentsebrugata

Because of fuel shortage during the Second World War, the trolleybus network was expanded in 1943 with line 21 from Skillebekk to Carl Berners plass converted. As part of this work a trolley line was built from Torshov to Bjølsen Depot to allow buses access to the depot. Oslo Sporveier decided at the end of the war that some of the tram lines with the least traffic should be closed. At the time trams had both a motorman and a conductor while buses only had a driver, and Oslo Sporveier could cut operating costs through this. Oslo Sporveier therefore decided to electrify another three lines. One of these was line 23, which ran from Bjølsen and Linnaaes gate downtown.

The tramway services to Korsvoll were terminated from 17 February 1949, the same day the Rodeløkka Line was closed. The trolleybus service commenced on 6 February 1949.

== Bibliography ==
- Aspenberg, Nils Carl (1996). Trolleybussene i Norge (in Norwegian). Oslo: Baneforlaget. ISBN 82-91448-03-5.
- Fristad, Hans Andreas (1990). Oslo-trikken – storbysjel på skinner (in Norwegian). Oslo: Gyldendal. ISBN 82-05-19084-4.
