= Kristiania Sporveisselskab =

Defunct tram company in Oslo, Norway

A/S Kristiania Sporveisselskab
- Company type: Private
- Industry: Tramway
- Founded: 26 August 1874
- Defunct: 1924
- Fate: Merger
- Successor: Oslo Sporveier
- Headquarters: Oslo, Norway

A/S Kristiania Sporveisselskab or KSS, nicknamed the Green Tramway (Norwegian: Grønntrikken), was an operator of part of the Oslo Tramway from 1875 to 1924. The company was established in 1874 and started with horsecar operations on the Ullevål Hageby Line, Gamlebyen Line and the Grünerløkka–Torshov Line. The network was electrified with in 1899 and 1900, whereby the company was bought by Union-Elektricitäts-Gesellschaft. It delivered new Class U trams. Within a few years the company had also opened the Vålerenga Line and Kampen Line. It took over Kristiania Kommunale Sporveie in 1905, taking over its fleet of Class S trams and the Sagene Ring, the Vippetangen Line and the Rodeløkka Line.

The company was based at Homansbyen Depot. From 1912 it started an extensive cooperation with its main competitor, Kristiania Elektriske Sporvei (KES). KSS also took delivery of the Class SS trams and from 1921 the Class H trams. The company build part of the Sinsen Line in 1923. Both companies were municipalized in 1924 to become Oslo Sporveier.

== History ==
=== Establishment ===
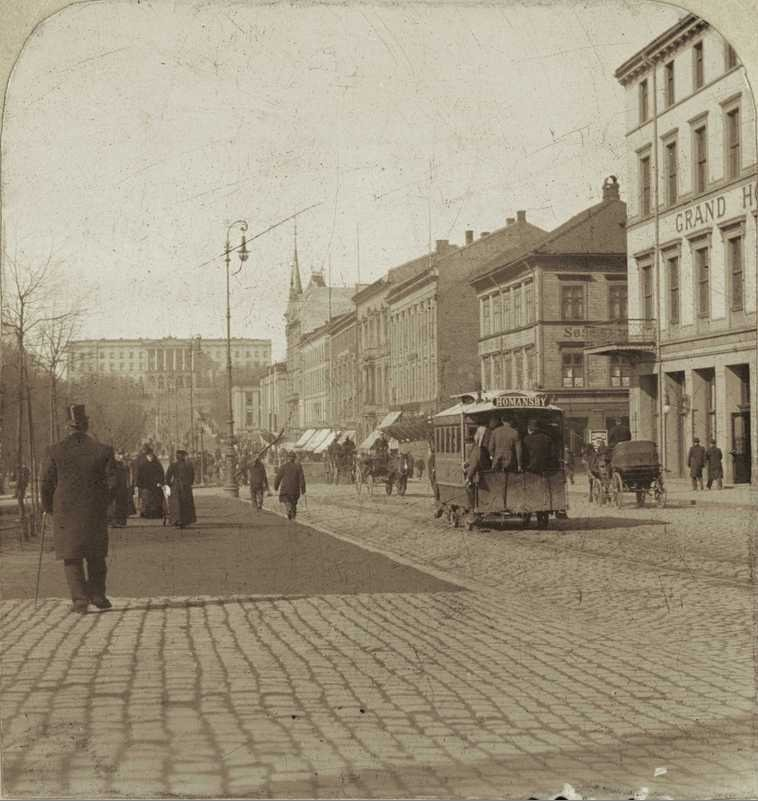
Horsecars in Karl Johans gate in 1898

The first plans for horsecar operations in Oslo—then known as Christiania—took place in 1868, when Engineer Jens Theodor Pauldan Vogt and Architect Paul Due applied for a concession. They proposed a line from Homansbyen to Gamlebyen (then known as Oslo) with branches to Pipervika and Palaisbryggen. The municipal authorities rejected the application—citing concerns of the street being too narrow. A new application was issued in 1873 with a common section with four branches, along Drammensveien, Gamlebyen, Oslo West Station (Vestbanen) and Grünerløkka. This time the municipality granted the necessary permissions.

Vogt and Due's concession was transferred to a company, A/S Kristiania Sporveisselskab, which was incorporated on 26 August 1874. The share capital was set to 200,000 speciedaler. The company bought a lot on Pilestredet 10,000 speciedaler, which became the site of Homansbyen Depot, including the company's administration. In its original design it had places for 44 vehicles and 116 horses, as well as a smithy, offices, apartments, a laboratory for the veterinary and a sick bay for twelve horses. The company was permitted to use tracks on top of the roads, although the municipality retained the right at any time to require them to be dug down. The company opted for standard gauge, presumably because this was most common amongst horsecars and eased procurement. Track-laying started in May 1875. Because of the location of the depot and the low traffic estimates along Drammensveien, KSS opted to instead build a branch to Homansbyen.

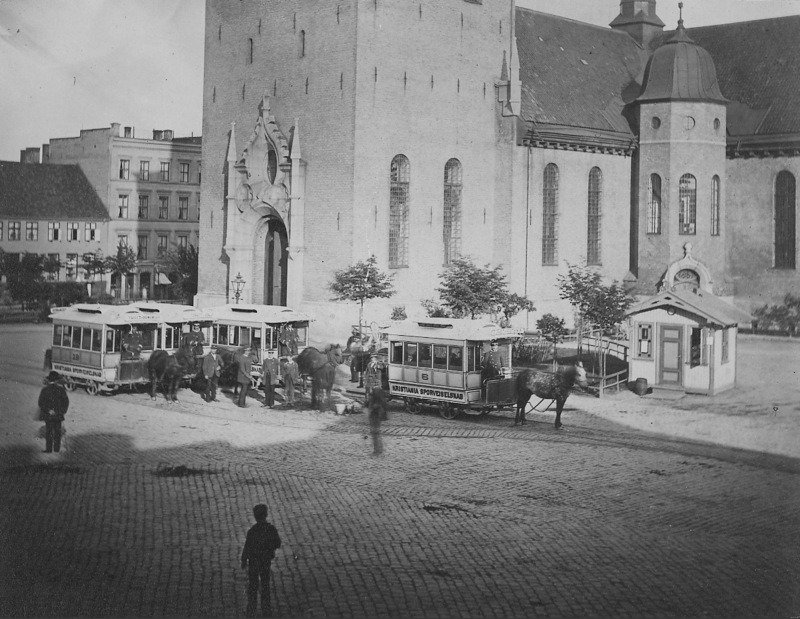
Horsecars outside Oslo Cathedral in 1876

The first twenty-two trams arrived from John Stephenson Company on 2 September 1875. The first horses arrived nine days later. Trial runs started on 21 September and operating permit was granted on 4 October. The official opening took place the following day. Regular traffic started on 6 October, as the second horsecar system in the Nordic Countries, after Copenhagen. The original network consisted of three services: from Homansbyen to Stortorvet, from Vestbanen to Stortorvet and from Stortorvet to Oslo. The services to Vestbanen corresponded with trains, while the other two operated every ten minutes. The fares were set to 10 øre. Shortly after a direct service was set up from Homansbyen to Vestbanen.

=== Horsecar operations ===
Oslo was at the time a highly segregated community with little interaction between the higher and lower classes. Amongst the concerns of the upper classes was that the trams would become popular with the lower classes and that there would be more interaction between classes. At first there were no regular stops, the horsecar would simply lower its speed and allow people to jump on and off where they wished. This was especially important on hills to keep the momentum and not wear out the horses. The horsecar would stop for elderly passengers and those of sufficient prominence. The company took delivery of seventeen sleds for use during winter. These proved much less suitable for operations, as the horses could not pull the same load on snow as on rails. The turnover time for horses was reduced, resulting in increased headway. The company therefore decided to salt and plow the tracks and instead use the horsecars during winter.

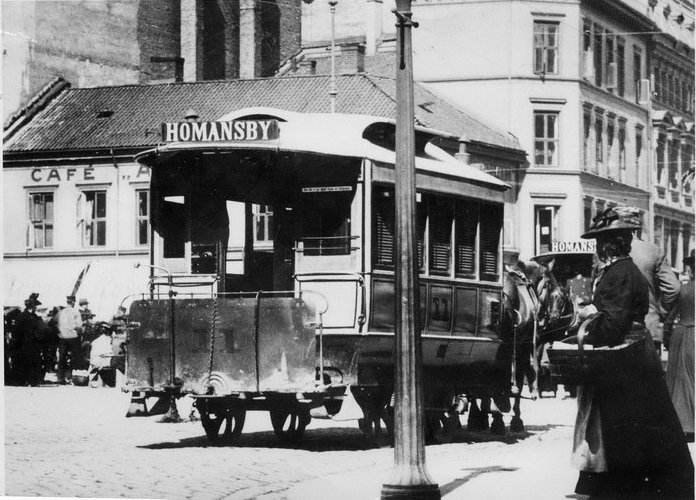
Horsecar in 1880

Profits were made immediately, and in 1877 an additional seven cars were delivered, allowing the headway to drop to five minutes. The company became a major retailer of used horses. These were sought after due to the good treatment they received at the company. However, if they ever walked down a street with tracks they would follow these blindly and it was difficult to get them to diverge off the route. From 1878, the fare increased to 15 øre for all routes. KSS opened its first extension on 18 March 1878, when the first part of the Grünerløkka–Torshov Line opened from Storgata to Thorvald Meyers gate. It was further extended to Beyer Bridge on 12 April 1879. In conjunction with this a new depot was built at Olaf Ryes plass with place for fifty horses and a number of horsecars. The Vestbanen Line was extended to Munkedamsveien on 5 May 1879.

Once these expansions were made the company fell more into a state of operation. From 9 July 1880 all routes terminating at Stortorvet were merged, resulting in direct services from Homansbyen to Oslo and from Grünerløkka to Vestbanen. This also meant that passengers no longer had to buy a new ticket for a transfer. Between 1887 and 1892 the company took delivery of seventeen new vehicles from Skabo. During the 1890s the company carried out some double tracking. The final batch of fifteen horsecars, built by Falkenried, were delivered in 1897. They were so heavy they needed to be hauled by two horses and were designed with the intention of being used as trailers for the electric trams.

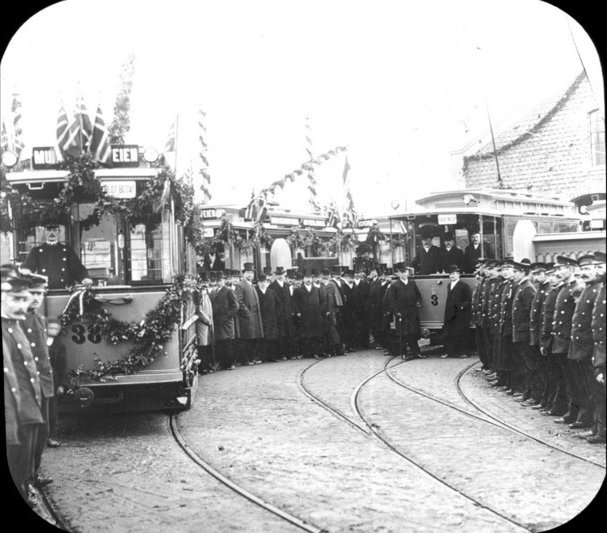
Opening of the electrification of the Grünerløkka–Torshov Line on 29 September 1899.

=== Electrification ===
Kristiania Elektriske Sporvei (KES) became the second tramway operator in Oslo when it opened its first two electric tramway lines on 2 March 1893. Although the new company received a permit for two new lines, KSS retained a preferential treatment allowing priority in building later new lines. KES had significantly lower operating costs and only charged 10 øre for its tickets. Although only very few locations had a choice between the two companies, KSS was soon viewed as outdated and expensive. They chose to cut their ticket prices to 10 øre in 1896.

To alleviate the situation, KSS's board approved plans in December 1897 for electrify their network. Meanwhile, the board decided to convert its entire network to double track. As tracks for an electric tramway had to be designed to allow for return current, an all-new trackage would have to be laid. These plans were approved by the annual meeting on 17 January 1898. The company both needed a supplier and capital, and struck a deal with Union-Elektricitäts-Gesellschaft, who would deliver the new infrastructures and trams, and also provided capital through purchasing a majority stake in the company. There was a general understanding for the conversion in the public, although there were many protests against installing overhead lines in Karl Johans gate.

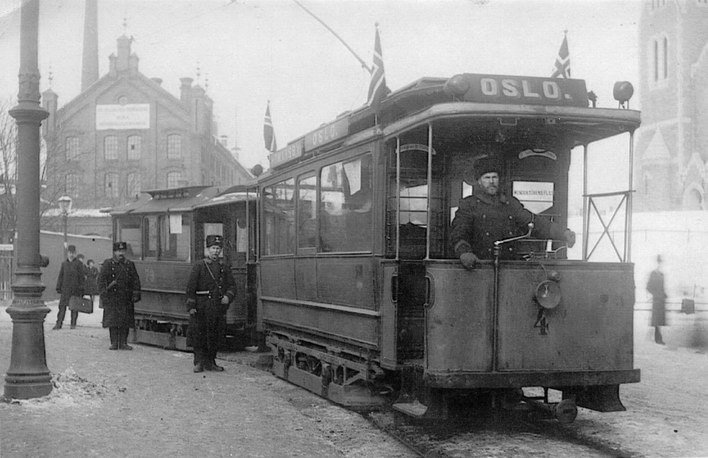
Class U tram hauling a converted horsecar trailer at Homansbyen Depot in 1905

The first section which was electrified was from Munkedamsveien to Grünerløkka, on 29 September 1899. The same day the line was extended to Torshov. The Homansbyen and Oslo Lines were electrified on 17 November, except for the section from Oslo Hospital to St Halvards plass, which had to be hauled by horses until 15 January 1900. This work required the delivery of new electrical trams. Forty-seven Class U units were delivered in 1899, with electrical equipment from Union and bodies built by Falkenried and Linke-Hofmann-Busch. Thirty-eight horsecars were converted to trailers.

The company continued the work by opening the Vålerenga Line on 3 May. The Kampen Line opened on 6 June. Both of these were branches of the Gamlebyen Line. This resulted in a major restructuring of the routes, with five lines each running on a ten-minute headway. The Grünerløkka–Torshov Line was the next to be expanded. Unlike the rest, it was financed by the municipalities of Kristiania and Aker, and was the first of KSS's lines to run outside the Kristiania's municipal borders. It opened in two stages, to Sandaker on 2 October 1901 to Grefsen Station on 28 November 1902.

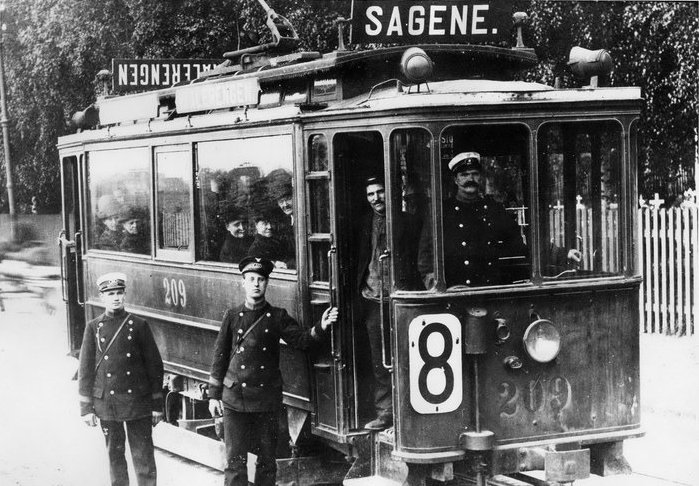
A converted Class S tram in 1915, inherited from KKS

=== Consolidation ===
By 1897 the Liberal Party had received a majority in the municipal council. The party had as part of its program stated that it wanted to municipalize the tramway operations. That year there was a political debate regarding an expansion of the KSS' tramway towards St. Hanshaugen and Sagene, two areas which were being developed. KSS applied to build a tramway there, but on 23 September 1897 the municipal council voted to establish its own tram company, Kristiania Kommunale Sporveie (KKS), and build a line to St. Hanshaugen Sagene itself. This resulted in three new lines. Sagene Ring opened in November 1899. The Rodeløkka Line, which opened in January 1900, used the lower section of the Grünerløkka Line to reach the city center. The Vippetangen Line was completed in August. However, none of the three lines connected with each other and KKS had to lease track from KSS.

KSS had a concession which expired in 1905, at which time the municipality could purchase the company at par value. This raised a new debate concerning public or private operations, with many Conservative politicians calling for the privatization of KKS. In the 1904 municipal election the issue was raised, with the Liberal Party and the socialist parties running for municipalization of tram operations. Meanwhile, the municipal administration worked with estimates for taking over KSS. A take-over would cost the municipality about NOK 2 million, while a sale would bring in about NOK 1.6 million. However, as KSS was a profitable company, it was estimated that the municipality would make more money by taking over KSS than selling KKS, estimated at about NOK 3 million for the period in question. The decisive municipal council meeting was held on 14 April 1905, although the actual vote did not occur until 02:00 hours the following day, after a nine-hour debate. The Conservative majority voted in favor of selling KKS to KSS and extending the latter's concession to 1924.

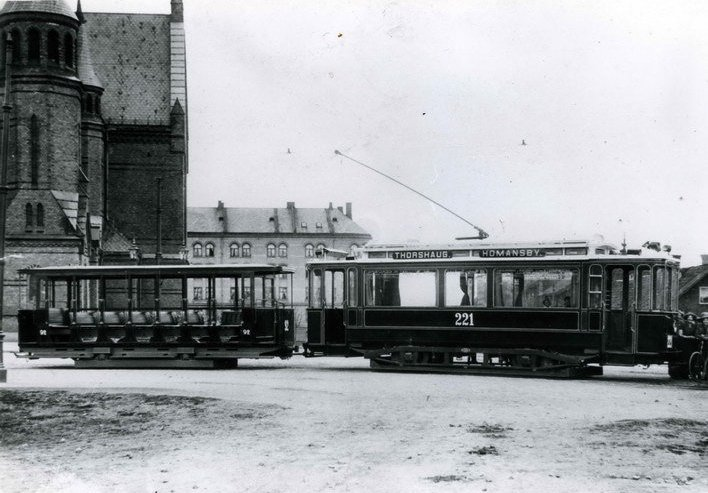
Tram hauling open Skabo trailer outside Sagene Church on Sagene Ring

With the takeover KSS required not only three lines, but also a fleet of twenty Class S motorized trams and twelve trailers. It also took over two depots. Sagene Depot was kept, while Rodeløkka Depot was closed. This resulted in new, mixed services: Homansbyen–Oslo, Homansbyen–Sannergata, Munkedamsveien–Sannergata–Grefsen, Munkedamsveien–Vålerenga, Sagene–St. Hanshaugen–Kampen, St. Hanshaugen–Rodeløkka and Stortorvet–Vippetangen. The Vippetangen Line was completed to Vippetangen on 8 November 1905.

=== Coordinated operations ===
The next extension took place on 24 September 1909, when the Homansbyen Line was extended to Adamstuen. In January 1910 the company introduced line numbers of its services. KES had done this a few months earlier and taken the first three digits, so KSS numbered their lines 4 through 10. From 1912 the two companies started to cooperate closely with their routes. This first materialized in a connecting line in Hegdehaugsveien, which allowed trams to run from Stortorvet via the Homansbyen Line to reach the Briskeby Line and Majorstuen. At Skillebekk a connection was built through Munkedamsveien, allowing the Vestbanen Line access to the Skøyen Line. The third connection opened in 1915, linking Jernbanetorget to the Kampen Line and the Vålerenga Line through a connection along Vognmannsgata, Brugata and Vaterland Bridge, allowing trams from there to serve Oslo East Station.

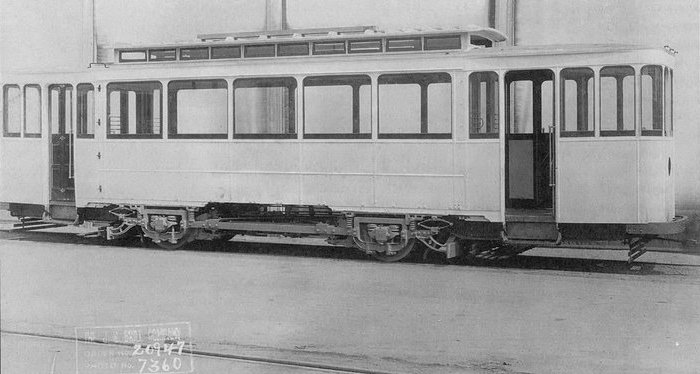
The one tram built by J. G. Brill Company, depicted in 1922

The second generation of electric trams, Class SS, were delivered in 1913 and 1914. The thirty-seven trams were significantly larger due innovations allowing longer wheelbases. By 1915 the street tram network consisted of thirteen services, of which two were operated by KES and six were joint operations. The joint services were operated the relative number of trams in proportion of the ownership of trackage along the line and where each company simply kept the revenue it created on their services. The first women conductors were hired in 1916. The Stephenson and Skabo horsecar trailers were taken out of service in 1917 and 1918. Sixteen were sold to the Bergen Tramway and the Trondheim Tramway.

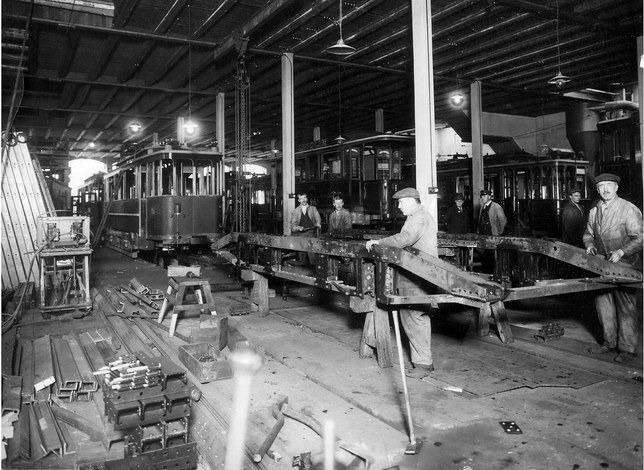
Homansbyen Depot in 1922

From the company's opening it had charged 10 øre for a ride, but this was raised to 15 øre in 1918, a price which would remain unaltered for the rest of its history. To ease management of such an odd amount, token coins were popular. They were sold with a quantity discount and were commonly used in Oslo as a conventional coin worth 15 øre. During this period the country was experiencing inflation. KES and the labor union could not reach an agreement for wage increases and the company was hit by a strike from 11 January to 22 March 1920. It was resolved through the municipality offering to reduce its charges. As part of the agreement, the 5 øre commuter prices in the morning and afternoon were abolished.

The last batch of trams were delivered from 1921 and 1923. On 1 February 1923 a branch the Rodeløkka Line, the Sinsen Line, was built to Carl Berners plass. The company's last extension took place on 18 December 1923, when the Vålerenga Line was extended to Bryn.

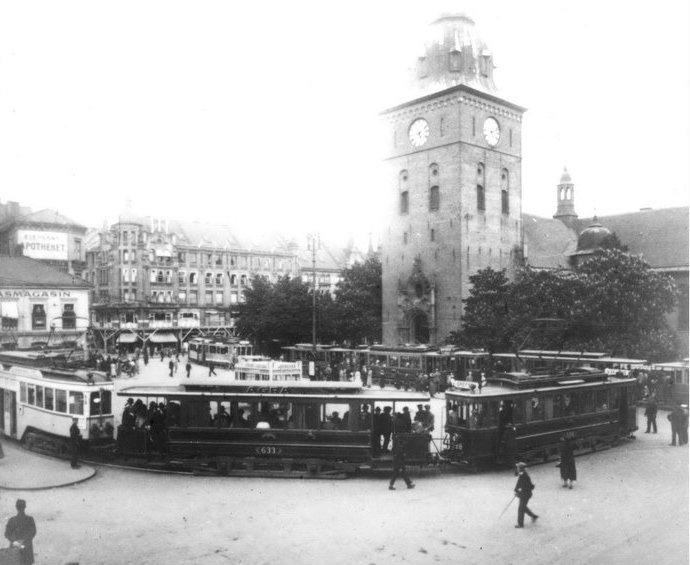
Both KKS, KES and Ekebergbanen trams at Stortorvet in 1923

=== Municipalization ===
KES and KSS both had concessions which expired on the same date, in March 1924. At this point the municipality was free to purchase the companies at par value. A municipal committee was appointed in 1922 to look into the matter. KES was valuated at NOK 9 million, while KSS was worth NOK 12.5 million. The committees majority proposed a merger and that KSS received a prolonged concession, while the minority recommended that the tramways be bought by the city. A third option, a jointly public and privately owned company, was also proposed, where the municipality would own fifty-one percent.

The issue was considered by the council's executive board, which supported the joint public–private proposal with eleven against nine votes. The argumentation was largely ideological: the left side accused the right for bringing economic advantages for private investors, while the right accused the left of insufficient financial investigations of municipal operations. The issue was voted on in the municipal council in December, with 43 against 41 councillors supporting the joint model. The latter were members of the Communist Party and the Labor Party, who both were in favor of a municipal take-over. The new company, Kristiania Sporveier, was incorporated in May 1924 and took over all street tram operations. The city changed its name to Oslo on 1 January 1925, as did the tram company.

== Network ==
A map of the tram network in 1939. Green lines denote KSS lines as of 1924, yellow lines those which were built by KES

KSS operated a network of tramway throughout most of eastern and northern Oslo. Through the city center it followed Karl Johans gate to Stortorvet, its hub. To the east the lines ran concurrently to Kirkeristen, where the Grünerløkka–Torshov Line split from the Oslo Line (later name the Gamlebyen Line). The latter ran through Grønland along Vognmannsgata and Schweigaards gate. The Oslo Line proper ran through Oslogate to St. Halvards plass and onwards to Oslo Hospital in Gamlebyen (at the time known as Oslo). From here the suburban Ekeberg Line, operated by Ekebergbanen continued southwards. Two lines branched off from the Oslo Line. The Kampen Line ran along Motzfeldts gate, Jens Bjelsens gate, Tøyengata, Hagagata and Brinkens gate to Kampen, Norway. Further down the Vålerenga Line branched off at Schweigaards gate and continued along it, St. Halvards gate, Vålerengagata and Etterstadgata.

The Grünerløkka–Torshov Line branches off from the Oslo Line at Brugata and ran further north along Storgata and then Thorvald Mayersgata through Grünerløkka. It then continues along Vogs gate and Sandakerveien through Torshov. At Storo it turns off onto Storoveien to Grefsen Station, a mainline railway station on the Gjøvik Line. From Nybrua the Rodeløkka Line branched off along Trondheimsveien and then followed Helgesens gate, Rathkes gate, Verksgata, Københavngata to the intersection at Dælenenggata. It served the neighborhoods of Rodeløkka and Dælenenga. The Sinsen Line continued along Trondheimsveien until Carl Berners plass.

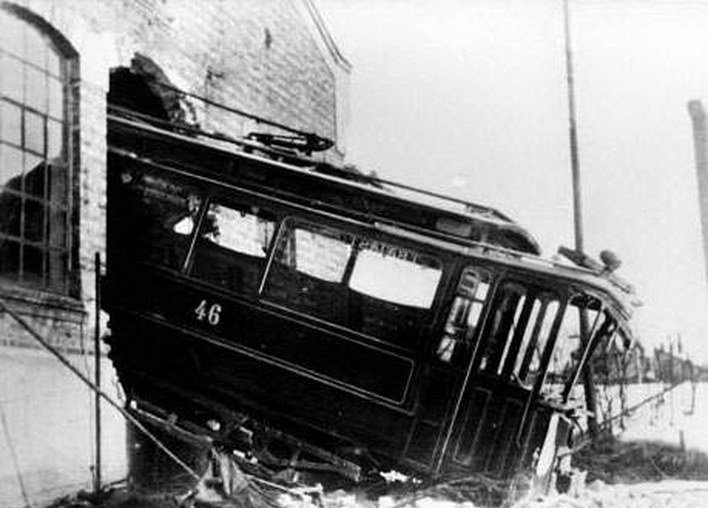
Class U tram after it crashed through the wall at Torshov Depot

To the west the line split northwards and southwards after running west along Karl Johans gate. The southern route, the Vestbanen Line, followed Rosenkrantz' gate to Oslo West Station, through Engens gate to Munkedamsveien. It ran along it to Cort Adlers gate, Huitfeldts gate and Larssons gate to Parkveien. From there it followed Munkedamsveien to Skillebekk, where it connected to KES's Skøyen Line. North from Karl Johans gate the Homansbyen Line (today the Ullevål Line) ran along Hedgehaugsveien, Pilestredet and Thereses gate to Adamstuen. Sagene Ring took off from Athenæum in Akersgata and ran northwards along Colletts gate, Geitemyrsveien and Kierschouws gate through the neighborhoods of St. Hanshaugen and Sagene. From there it ran across Bentse Bridge to connect with the Grünerløkka–Torshov Line at Torshov.

Homansbyen Depot was constructed with a building housing the company's administrative office, horse stables, a wagon depot, a forge, and a weighing shed. These installations were designed by the Norwegian architect Henrik Thrap-Meyer. It was expanded in conjunction with the electrification. KSS had a depot at Grünerløkka from 1880 to 1899. When it then extended the line to Torshov, it built a new depot there and closed the one at Grünerløkka. KSS took over Sagene Depot and Rodeløkka Depot with the KKS takeover, but the latter was immediately closed. The company's final depot opening took place in 1922, when it opened Vålerenga Depot.

== Rolling stock ==
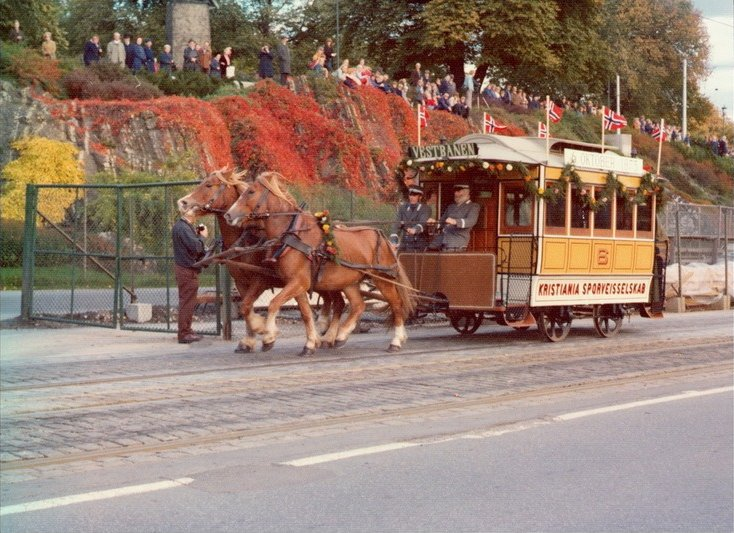
Heritage KSS horsecar in 1975

During its period of horsecar operations, KSS took delivery of 57 units. These are subdivided into three classes, each manufactured by a different company and with distinct specifications. After the closing of the horsecar network, thirty-eight units were converted to trailers for electric trams. The first class was built by John Stephenson Company and consisted of twenty-nine units delivered in 1875 and 1877. They were 4.1 meters (13 ft) long and 2 meters (6 ft 7 in) wide. They weighed 1.8 tonnes (1.8 long tons; 2.0 short tons) and were bidirectional, allowing seating for fourteen seated passengers.

The second class consisted of fourteen units delivered by Skabo between 1887 and 1892. These were delivered in various configurations of open and closed seating and were normally only operated during winter. They had the same dimensions as the Stephenson cars. The final class, built by Falkenried, consisted of fifteen units delivered in 1897. Measuring 6.6 meters (22 ft) in length, they were sufficiently heavy they needed to be hauled by two horses. This was a calculated choice, as they were primarily intended to be used as trailers for the electric trams.

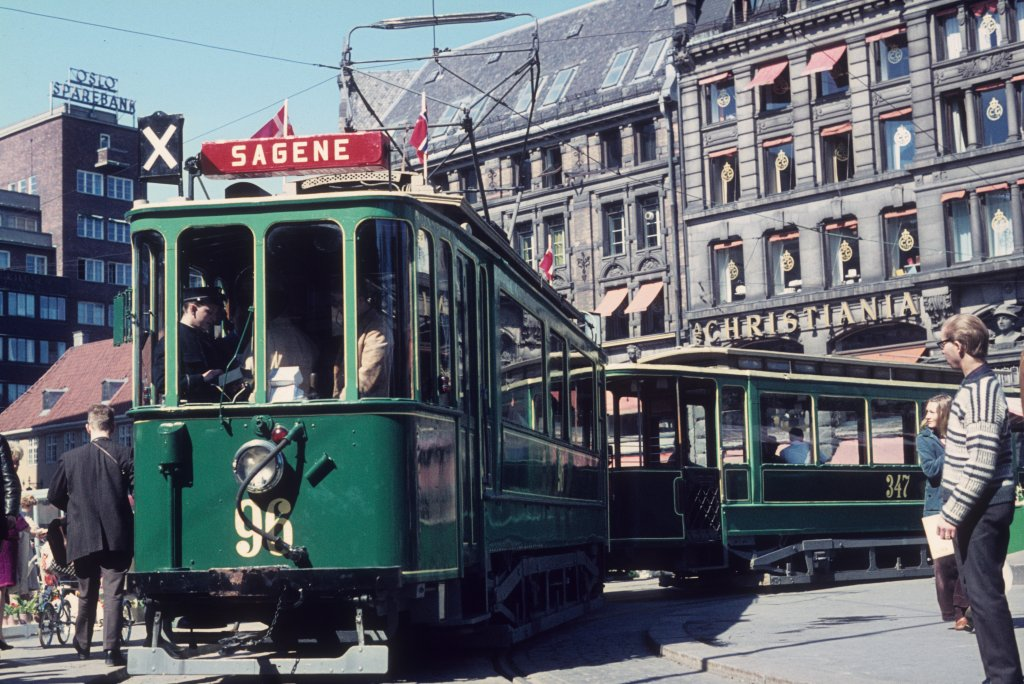
Heritage Class SS tram in KSS's green livery

The first electric trams were forty-seven Class U trams delivered in 1899. The electrical components were built by Union-Elektricitäts-Gesellschaft and the bodies by Falkenried and Skabo. The trams had two GE52 motors with a combined power output of 36 kilowatts (48 hp) and had a total weight of 10.2 tonnes (10.0 long tons; 11.2 short tons). They were 7.8 meters (26 ft) long and were built with open platform bays. Each unit had capacity for twenty seated and fourteen standing passengers.

The company inherited twenty trams and twelve trailers in the KKS takeover. These had an identical 7.8-meter (26 ft) long and 2.0-meter (6 ft 7 in) body with wooden exterior paneling. KKS ordered the trams from Schukert & Co., who built the electrical and technical equipment, while the bodies were built by Busch. They features outdoor bays for the motorman and a cabin with wooden benches in the longitudinal direction. All units had seating for twenty passengers. The motorized vehicles had seating for fourteen, while the trailer had seating for twenty.

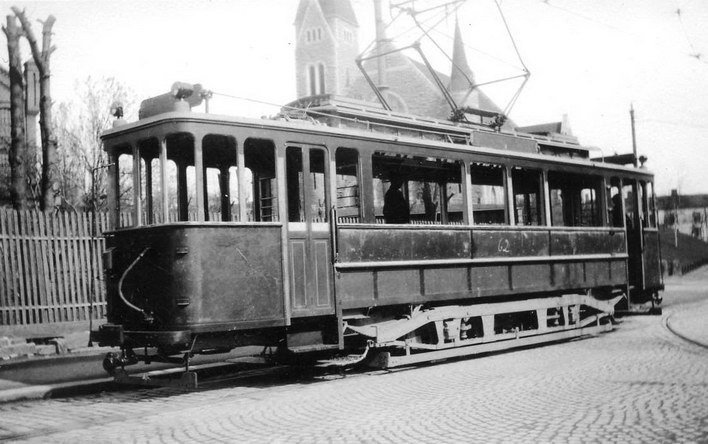
Class H tram, rebuilt from an old Class S, during trial runs in 1923

KSS took delivery of thirty-seven Class SS motorized trams and twenty-two trailers between 1912 and 1914. They had electrical components from Siemens-Schukertwerke and were variously built by Falkenried and Skabo. Their main innovation was that the wheelbase was increased from 180 to 360 centimeters (71 to 142 in), allowing for a lengthening of the body. They were 11.47 meters (37.6 ft) long and had a power output of 84 kilowatts (113 hp).

Class H was the final series delivered to KSS. Due to inflation in Germany they were cheap and were mostly bought to allow smaller units to retire. KSS bought seventeen new trams, electrical equipment for seventeen and thirty-four new trailers. The electrical equipment was used to rebuild and expand existing trams, particularly Class S units. One unit was bought from J. G. Brill Company with General Electric motors. The rest were bought from Hannoversche Waggonfabrik with electrical equipment from Siemens-Schukertwerke. The trams were 11.2 meters (37 ft) long and weight between 14 and 15 tonnes (14 and 15 long tons; 15 and 17 short tons). They sat twenty-four passengers.

Four horsecars, ten motorized trams and four trailers have been preserved by Oslo Tramway Museum.

== Bibliography ==
- Aspenberg, Nils Carl (1994). Trikker og forstadsbaner i Oslo (in Norwegian). Oslo: Baneforlaget. ISBN 82-91448-03-5.
- Fasting, Kåre (1975). Sporveier i Oslo gjennom 100 år: 1875–1975 (in Norwegian). Oslo: Grøhdal & Søn. ISBN 82-504-0116-6.
- Fristad, Hans Andreas (1990). Oslo-trikken – storbysjel på skinner (in Norwegian). Oslo: Gyldendal. ISBN 82-05-19084-4.
- Hartmann, Eivind; Mangset, Øistein (2001). Neste stopp!: Verneplan for bygninger (in Norwegian). Oslo: Baneforlaget. ISBN 82-91448-17-5.
