= KKS Class S =

Class S
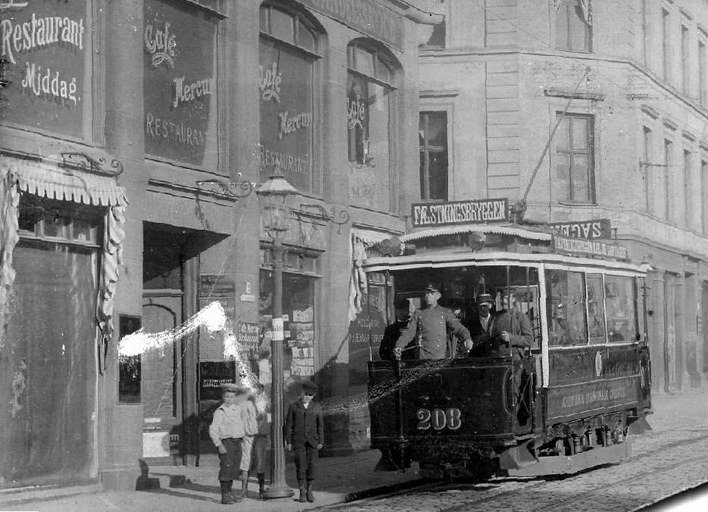
- KKS Class S tram no. 208 in Karl Johans gate in 1900

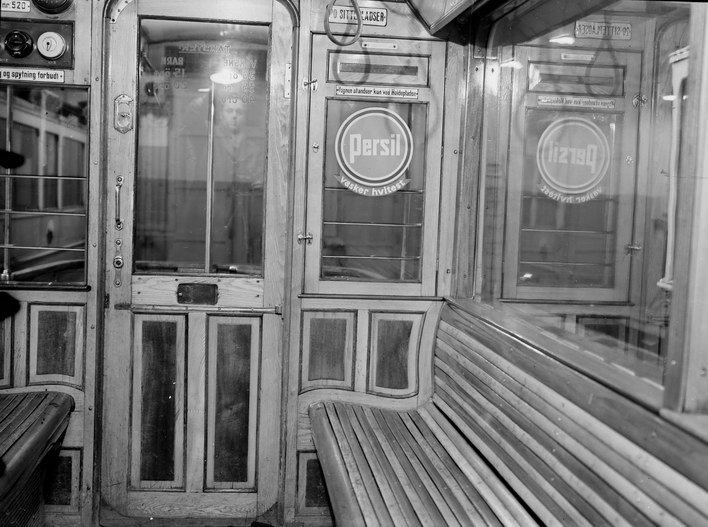
- Interior in 1960
- Manufacturer: Schuckert & Co. Busch
- Constructed: 1899
- Number built: 20 motor cars 12 trailers
- Capacity: 20 seated, 14–20 standing
- Operators: Kristiania Kommunale Sporveie (1899–1905); Kristiania Sporveisselskab (1905–24); Oslo Sporveier (1924–67)

Specifications
- Car length: 7.8 m (25 ft 7 in)
- Width: 2.0 m (6 ft 7 in)
- Weight: 9.3 t (motor car); 6.4 t (trailer)
- Traction system: 2× Schuckert AB71
- Power output: 51 kW (68 hp)
- Electric system(s): 600 V DC Overhead wire
- Current collector(s): Trolley pole / Bow collector / Pantograph
- Track gauge: 1,435 mm (4 ft 8 1/2 in)

Class S (Norwegian: type S) was a class of 20 twin-axle trams and 12 trailers built by Schuckert & Co. and Busch for Kristiania Kommunale Sporveie (KSS) in 1899. The trams were originally 7.8 meters (25 ft 7 in) long and 2.0 meters (6 ft 7 in) wide. They featured wooden benches in the longitudinal direction seating twenty. The motor cars had two motors providing a combined power output of 51 kilowatts (68 hp). The motor cars weighed 9.3 tonnes (9.2 long tons; 10.3 short tons), while the trailers weighed 6.4 tonnes (6.3 long tons; 7.1 short tons).

Ownership of the class moved to Kristiania Sporveisselskab (KSS) in 1904, when it bought KKS. The trams were variously rebuilt from 1918. One was converted to a snow plow, while three motor cars and three trailers were converted to cargo trams for hauling grain. The remaining units were rebuilt and lengthened in 1919 and 1920. The wheelbase was extended from 1.8 to 3.0 metres (5 ft 11 in to 9 ft 10 in) and the platform bays covered. A further rebuilding took place between 1921 and 1925, when they received new motors and undercarriages from Siemens Schuckertwerke. They passed on to Oslo Sporveier when it took over KSS in 1924. There the trams remained in service until 1967.

== History ==
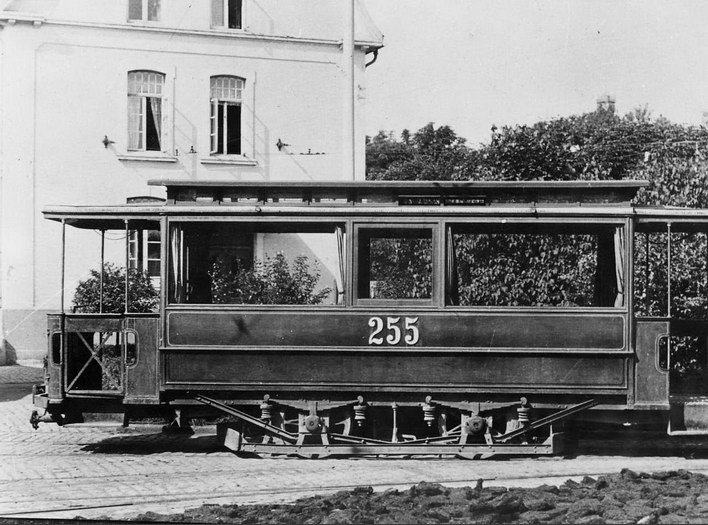
Trailer no. 255

Kristiania Kommunale Sporveie was the third street tram operator in Oslo and the first to be owned by the municipality. The municipal council voted on 23 September 1897 to establish the company, which was issued the task of building three lines: Sagene Ring, the Rodeløkka Line and the Vippetangen Line. These lines opened in intervals in 1899 and 1900.

Two city engineers were sent on a study tour of Germany and the Netherlands to gain experience from tram operations there. KKS placed its order with Schuckert & Co. of Nürnburg and Busch, consisting of twenty motor cars and twelve trailers. All 32 units were delivered in 1899. Schuckert had recently delivered the first trams to Holmenkolbanen (HkB), which operated a suburban tramway in Oslo. However, KKS opted for larger trams than HkB, ordering trams of the same size as those operated by the two other street tram operators, Kristiania Sporveisselskab and Kristiania Elektriske Sporvei (KES). To avoid overlapping numbers with KSS and KES and KSS, the Class S motor units were numbered 201–220 and the trailers numbered 250–261. They received a dark red paint scheme and were KKS therefore became known as the "Red Trams".

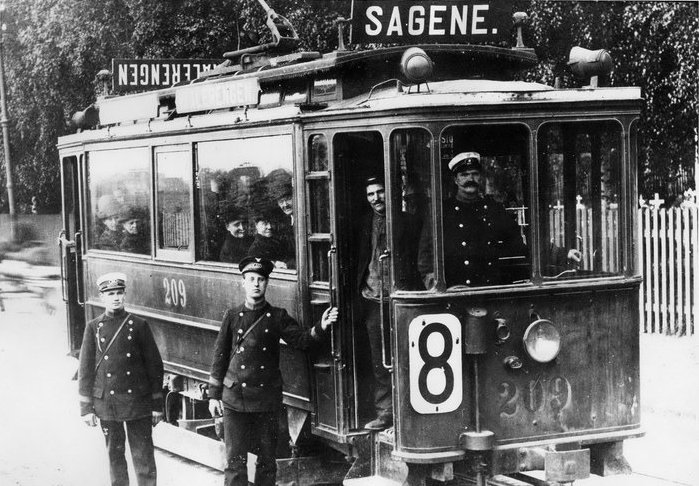
No. 209 in 1915 after receiving a covered bay

The trams were initially used on KKS's three lines. Most services were only run with the motor cars and the trailers were seldom used. Some of the trams were on occasion leased to Holmenkolbanen, who used them on the Holmenkollen Line. The lack of secondary suspension caused complaints from customers who experienced a smoother ride with the trams operated by KSS and KES. KKS was sold to KSS in 1905 and the latter took over all the rolling stock. They were thereafter gradually painted in KSS's green color scheme. The open bays were removed from the motor cars in 1910 and renumbered 48–67. The trolley was replaced with a pantograph in 1915.

With the delivery of the Class SS starting 1914, the older Class S trains became less popular due to their limit size and comfort. However, they were still technically suited for service. Nos. 48, 49 and 66 were converted to trailers in 1916, being renumbered 247–249. By 1918 the class was removed from regular service. That year no. 57 collided and KSS decided to rebuild it. The body was removed and the undercarriage and motors were used to construct a snowplow unit. The plow itself came out on the side and could be maneuvered from within. This allowed it to plow the tracks and the section from the tracks to the sidewalk. It remained in operation until 1950.

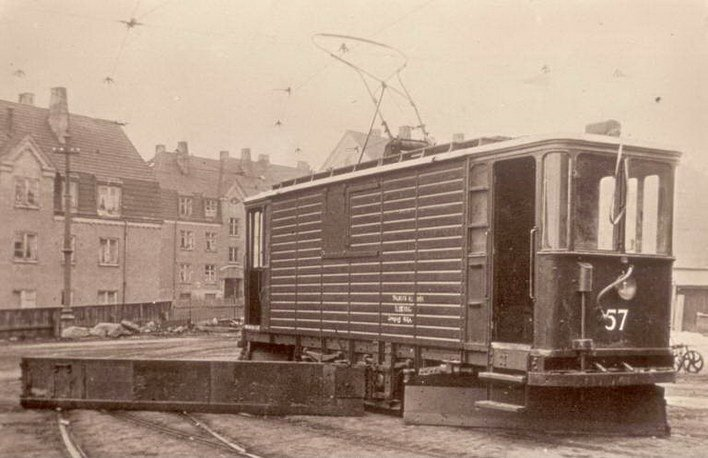
No. 57 after it had been converted to a slowplow

KKS started a grain tram service in 1918, which linked Statkorn's silo at Vippetangen to Bjølsen Valsemølle. This transport took place using three dedicated trams, which were rebuilt from trams no. 49, 50 and 66. The motors, undercarriage, platforms and frame were reused, while an all-new body were built. In addition, three trailers were converted. The trams had a capacity for 5 tonnes (4.9 long tons; 5.5 short tons) of grain and entered service on 27 April 1918, February 1919 and 2 October 1920. A fourth conversion of a motor car to a trailer took place in 1925. The grain trams were retired from in 1932 when two new trams were delivered, although to motor cars and two trailers were kept as reserves. For a period in 1941 and 1942 one tram was leased to Bærumsbanen. The last of these were scrapped in 1950.

All remaining motor cars were rebuilt in 1919 and 1920, increasing their length. They were further modified at Homansbyen Depot in 1922 and 1923. The bodies were lengthened and axles were kept, but the undercarriages and motors were replaced. The units were renumbered 505–521 and received motors from Siemens Schuckertwerke, while the undercarriages were built at the depot. Other trams were also given a similar renovation, giving them a similar look. The trams were from then generally known as "Municipal HaWa". KSS was taken over by Oslo Sporveier in 1924 and in 1927 the Class S trams were renumbered 519–540. They remained in operation until 28 October 1967.

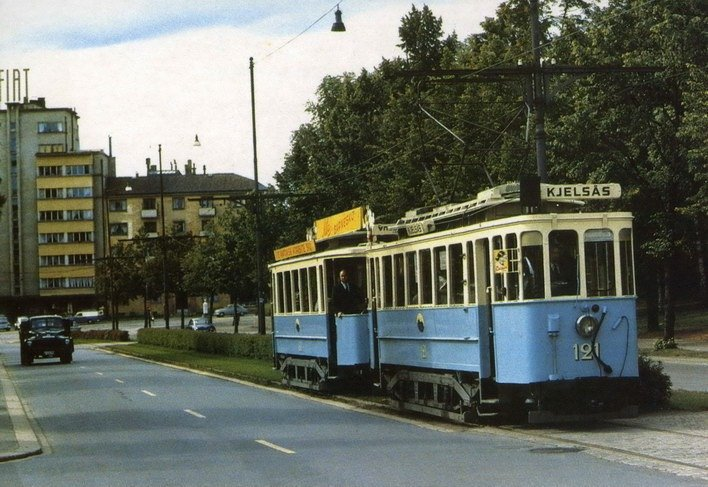
A rebuilt Class S on the Frogner Line during the 1950s

The trailers also received a renovation from 1921 to 1925, although the body and interior remained intact. The main upgrades included new connectors to allow them to run in multiple with newer trams and track brakes. With these upgrades the trailers normally ran with SS trams. One trailer was requisitioned by the German occupation forces and moved to the Stettin Tramway. It was numbered 519 and remained in service until 1945. One trailer collided on 16 May 1944 and was subsequently retired. The remaining nineteen units remained in service until May 1966 and October 1967, respectively. Many of the older undercarriages were rebuilt to maintenance of way material. This included five ballast cars, six flatcars and various other specialized vehicles. As of 1996 many were still in use.

One of the "Municipa HaWa" trams has been preserved by the Oslo Tramway Museum. Except for the length, it has been remodeled in accordance with the delivery design from 1899. They museum attempted to preserve a trailer, but Oslo Sporveier instead chose to scrap the last unit in December 1969. However, the museum has preserved a ballast car.

== Specifications ==
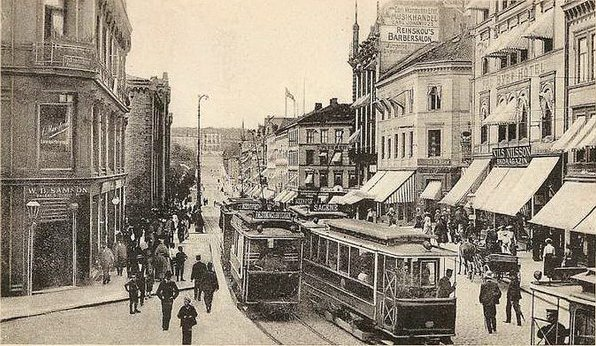
Trams at Egertorvet in 1902

The trams and the trailers had identical bodies. They were 7.8 meters (26 ft) long and had a capacity for twenty passengers along two benches aligned along the width of the carriage. In their original configuration they featured outdoor bays, but this was removed in 1915. The cabin had two benches in the longitudinal direction, providing seating for 20 people. In addition there was standing space for 14 people in the motorized units and 20 in the trailers.

Each motor car was equipped with two Schuckert AB71 two-pole serial motors, which each produced 25.5 kilowatts (34.2 hp). This gave a total power output of 51 kilowatts (68 hp). Controlling was carried out with two serial and three parallel contacts, as well as five for breaking. The resistance breaks worked poorly and thus manual breaking was used during ordinary operations. They were only equipped with primary suspension, which made the ride more uncomfortable.

The modified units from 1919 received a lengthening, with longer and larger platform bays. This allowed standing capacity to rise to 48, although the cabin and the seating remained unaltered. The wheelbase increased to 3.0 meters (9.8 ft) and track brakes and secondary suspension was installed. In the 1922 modification they were further extended by 1 meter (3 ft 3 in), this time the cabin was lengthened and seating increased to 24 and the platform bays were rebuilt with walls. In their final, "Municipal HaWa" configuration, the trams were 11.2 meters (37 ft) long, weighed 15.9 tonnes (15.6 long tons; 17.5 short tons) and had a power output of 102 kilowatts (137 hp).
