= Sagene (disambiguation) =

Sagene may refer to:

== Places ==
- Sagene, a district of the city of Oslo, Norway
- Sagene Line, an abandoned line of the Oslo Tramway in Sagene in Oslo, Norway
- Sagene Depot, a disused tram depot in Sagene in Oslo, Norway
- Sagene Church, a church in Sagene in the city of Oslo, Norway
- Sagene, Agder, a village in Arendal municipality in Agder county, Norway

== Other ==
- sagene, an old unit of length that is now among the Obsolete Russian units of measurement
- sagene, an old unit of length that is now among the Obsolete Tatar units of measurement
