= Vålerenga Line =

Former tram line in Oslo, Norway

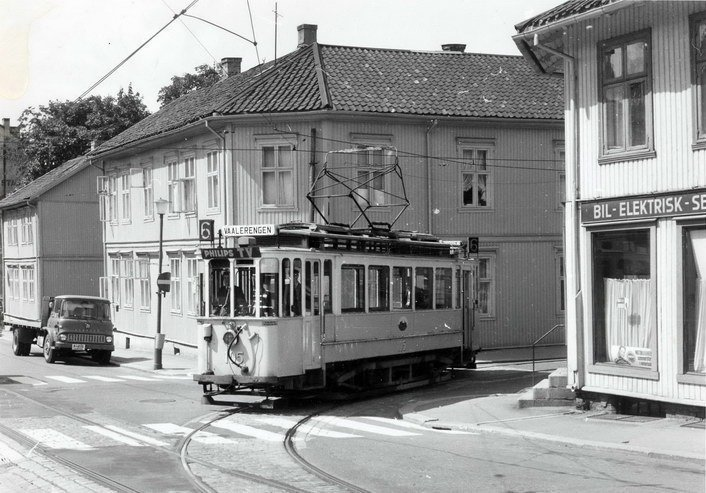

Overview
- Native name: Vålerenglinjen
- Owner: Kristiania Sporveisselskab (1900–24); Oslo Sporveier (1924–68)
- Locale: Oslo, Norway

Service
- Type: Tramway
- System: Oslo Tramway
- Depot(s): Vålerenga Depot

History
- Opened: 3 May 1900
- Closed: 23 June 1968

Technical
- Number of tracks: Double
- Character: Tramway
- Track gauge: 1,435 mm (4 ft 8 1/2 in)
- Electrification: 600 V DC
Route map
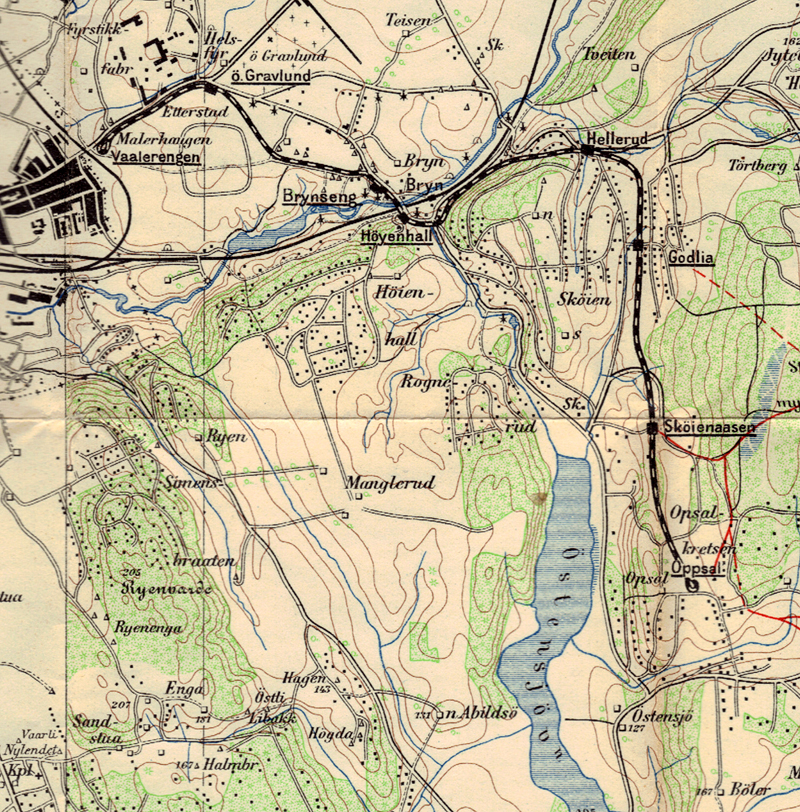

The Vålerenga Line (Norwegian: Vålerengalinjen), also known as Helsfyr Line and Etterstad Line, is an abandoned line of the Oslo Tramway of Norway. It branched from the Gamlebyen Line in Schweigaards gate and ran into the neighborhoods of Vålerenga, Etterstad and Helsfyr. The line followed the streets of Schweigaards gate, St. Halvars gate, Enebakkveien, one direction each in Vålerenggata and Strømsveien, and Etterstadgata. The line continued as a suburban light rail as the Østensjø Line and the Lambertseter Line.

The line was established by Kristiania Sporveisselskab (KSS) on 3 May 1900. In 1923 the first part of the Østensjø Line, owned by Akersbanerne, opened, as did KSS's Vålerenga Depot was opened. Ownership of the line passed to Oslo Sporveier in 1924. Two years later the Østensjø Line open, but not until 1937, when Bærumsbanen took over operations, was there provided a through service. The Østensjø Line became part of the Oslo Metro in 1966. With the reduction in traffic, the Vålerenga Line was closed on 23 June 1968, as part of a citywide gradual closure of the tramway.

== Route ==
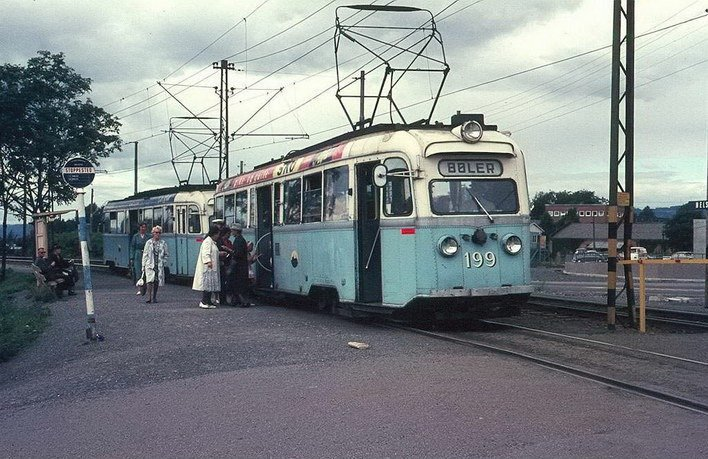
Gullfisk tram at Helsfyr in 1966

The Vålerenga Line was a branch of the Gamlebyen Line, which served the neighborhoods of Vålerenga, Helsfyr and Etterstad. The Vålerenga Line branched from the Gamlebyen Line in Schewigaards gate and continued along it before following St. Halvars gate, Enebakkveien, Vålerenggata and finally Etterstadgata. From 1923 part of the tracks were rearranged, so that the upward tracks (bound northeast) went through Vålerengagata, while the downward bound tracks placed in Strømsveien. The line was also extended over the Gjøvik Line. The line originally had its terminus in Etterstadgata, but from 1926 it was placed at Grensen, on the municipal border. From there the line continued as the Østensjø Line as a suburban light rail.

Kristiania Sporveisselskab and later Oslo Sporveier operated Vålerenga Depot in conjunction with the line. It served as the main depot for trams which were serving the eastern lines. From 1927 it was also used as a bus garage.

== History ==
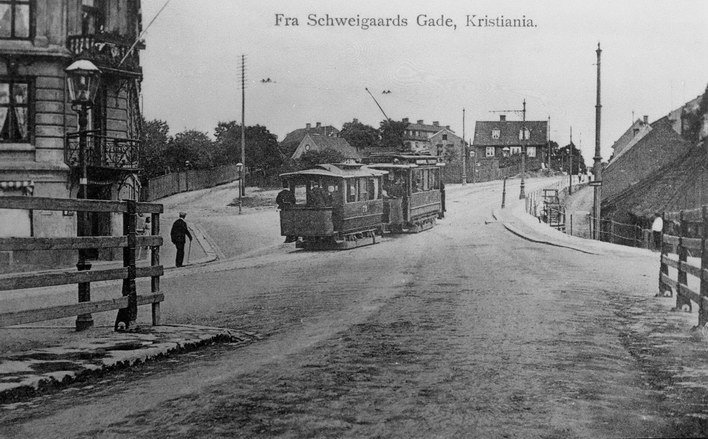
Class U tram at the intersection of Schweigaards gate and St. Halvards gate in 1905

The Gamlebyen Line—until 1925 known as the Oslo Line—was one of the original horsecar lines in Oslo, opened by KSS on 6 October 1875. The Vålerenga area and its vicinity were incorporated into the municipality of Christiania (today Oslo) in 1878 and the areas experience a growth.

During the late 1890s and early 1900s Oslo experienced a rapid expansion of its tram networks. Kristiania Sporveisselskab carried out an electrification of its system from 1897; this was completed on 14 January 1900 when the Oslo Line was finished converted. During this period KSS carried out the construction of two branches of the Oslo Line. The Vålerenga Line opened on 3 May and the Kampen Line on 6 June. The Vålerenga Line was routed through the city center and connected to the Vestbanen Line. From 1915 it became part of Line 8, which linked to the Sagene Line. KSS opened a depot in Hedmarksgata along the Vålerenga Line in February 1923.

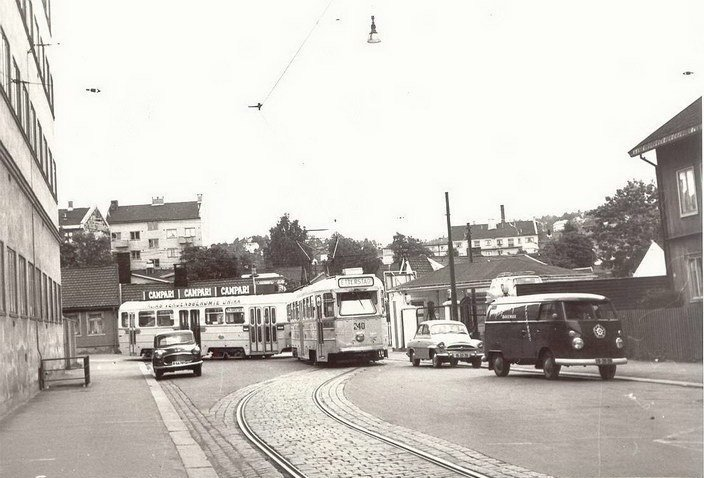
SM53 tram in Strømsveien in 1962

Plans for a suburban light rail into the neighboring municipality of Aker were launched in 1917. It materialized in the Østensjø, for which construction commenced in February 1922. The line was built was an extension of the Vålerenga Line. However, it was built by Akersbanerne and KSS. The first part of the line, from Etterstad to Bryn, was opened on 18 December 1923. Initially it was served by that Line 17 was rerouted to serve the Vålerenga Line, and every other service ran all the way to Bryn. As part of the opening the tracks were from 18 February 1923 rearranged so that northeast-bound trains ran through Vålerengagata and in the other direction through Strømsveien.

KSS merged in May 1924 to create Oslo Sporveier and it took over services on the Vålerenga Line. The Østensjø Line was extended to Oppsal in 1926. However, Oslo Sporveier and Akersbanerne could not come to terms regarding the lease of the Vålerenga Line. The issue was driven by the lack of a suitable turning loop with free capacity in the city center. Instead, Akersbanerne decided to operate the trams to Etterstad, where there would be transfer, without transfer tickets, between the two tram companies. From 1927 the line was served by trams 6 and 16. The situation was resolved from 4 January 1937, when Bærumsbanen took over operations on the Østensjø Line. It already operated the Lilleaker Line in a similar fashion on the other end of town, which also suffered under the lack of turning capacity through town. The predominantly used Gullfisk trams on their service.

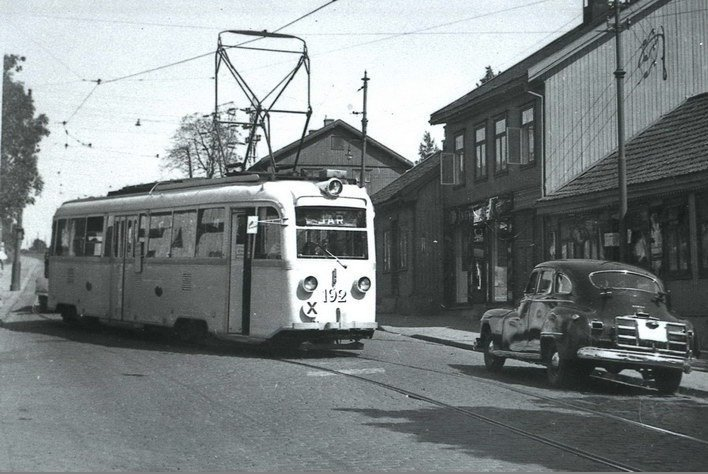
Gullfisk in Strømsveien in the first half of the 1950s

Following the 1948 merger of the municipalities of Oslo and Aker, it was decided that the Nordstrand area in the former Aker would be opened to large-scale construction of housing. To aid transport, the city council voted on 9 December 1954 to build the Lambertseter Line from Bryn to Bergkrystallen. At the same time it was decided that both the Lambertseter and the Østensjø Lines would become part of the Oslo Metro. Built and operated by Oslo Sporveier, services commenced on 10 April 1957 using SM53 trams.

The city council voted in 1960 to gradually close the tramway and instead rely on diesel buses and the metro. The Østensjø Line was being converted to metro standard and would be connected to the new Common Tunnel. It would therefore no longer need the Vålerenga Line to reach the city center. This resulted in a series of tram lines being closed during the 1960s. The Lambertseter Line was closed for tram traffic on 18 May 1966 and opened as part of the metro five days later. The Østensjø Line was closed during the evening of 25 October 1967 and similarly converted in three days. Oslo Sporveier continued to serve the Vålerenga Line until 24 June 1968, the last day of services on the line. The closing of the line allowed the company to retire all its twin-axle stock without ordering new trams.

== Bibliography ==
- Aspenberg, Nils Carl (1996). Trolleybussene i Norge (in Norwegian). Oslo: Baneforlaget. ISBN 82-91448-03-5.
- Fristad, Hans Andreas (1990). Oslo-trikken – storbysjel på skinner (in Norwegian). Oslo: Gyldendal. ISBN 82-05-19084-4.
