= Homansbyen Depot =

Former Oslo Tramway depot

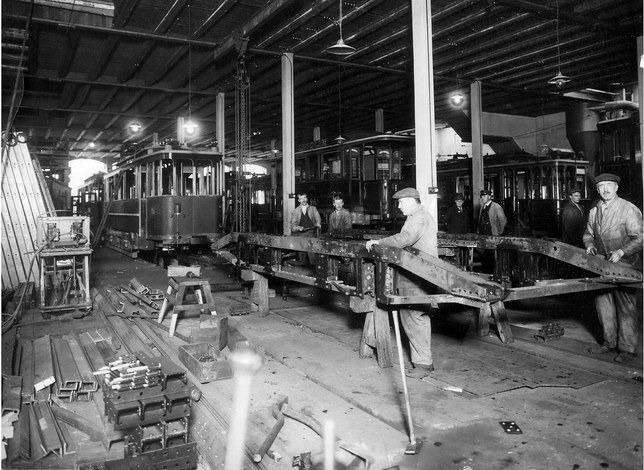
The depot in 1922

Homansbyen Depot (Norwegian: Homansbyen vognhall), officially Kristiania Sporveisanlæg ("Kristiania Tramway Installation") was an Oslo Tramway depot located at Sporveisgata 8 near Bislett in Oslo, Norway. It was constructed for Kristiania Sporveisselskab in 1874 and was the first tramway depot in the country. The facilities were designed by Henrik Thrap-Meyer and featured an administrative office, a horse stable, a forge, a workshop, a weighing shed, and a wagon depot. It had space for 28 horse wagons, 16 sleds, and 116 horses. The administrative office was built in brick and housed apartments, offices, and a laboratory for the veterinarian. The depot was reconstructed several times, and taken out of use in 1966. It was demolished three years later, and replaced with residential apartment blocks.

== History ==
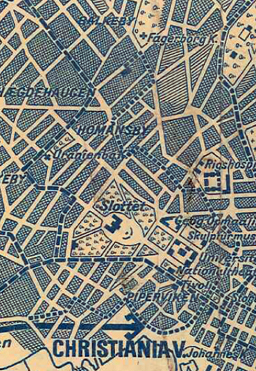
A map of the Homansbyen Line from c. 1900. The depot was until 1912 located at the very end of the Homansbyen Line at Bislett.

The tramway operating company Kristiania Sporveisselskab was established on October 2, 1874, and started scheduled horse tram services on October 6, 1875. The network comprised a line from Homansbyen over Stortorvet to Gamlebyen, with a branch line to Oslo West Station. Also in October 1874, Kristiania Sporveisselskap bought 12 square kilometers (4.6 sq mi) of the square Underhaug near Bislett, at the end of the Homansbyen Line, where the depot was built. It was constructed with a building housing the company's administrative office, horse stables, a wagon depot, a forge, and a weighing shed. These installations were designed by the Norwegian architect Henrik Thrap-Meyer. All installations but the head office were addressed to Sporveisgata 8. The head office was addressed to Underhaugsveien.

When the Oslo Tramway was electrified in 1899, a large reorganization of Homansbyen Depot took place. The horse stables were rebuilt to serve as tramway depots, requiring more space. The workshop was extended with additional rooms in the surrounding buildings. Plans for building a steam power station at the depot never materialised.

Kristiania Sporveisselskab acquired Kristiania Kommunale Sporveie in 1905, and additional extensions of the depot were built. In 1907, the administrative office was completely rebuilt two years later, and an additional 60-meter (200 ft) long tramway depot was constructed in Pilestredet. When Oslo Sporveier acquired all the city's private tram companies in 1924, Homansbyen became the head office. Homansbyen also housed the payroll office.

During the World War II, on August 29, 1944, two armed men entered the payroll office in Underhaugsveien and stole 120,000 Norwegian krone (NOK), while demanding the local treasurer Knut Holmstøen and his assistant to hold their hands lifted. The two men have not been identified, but they are suspected to have come from Milorg, which had a deficit of money during the war.

When the Etterstad Depot became operational in 1966, the Homansbyen Depot was closed and the property sold. The tramway installations were demolished in 1969 and replaced with apartment blocks, local schools, and offices. The only still visible trace of the depot is the street name Sporveisgata ("The Tramway Street").

== Facilities ==
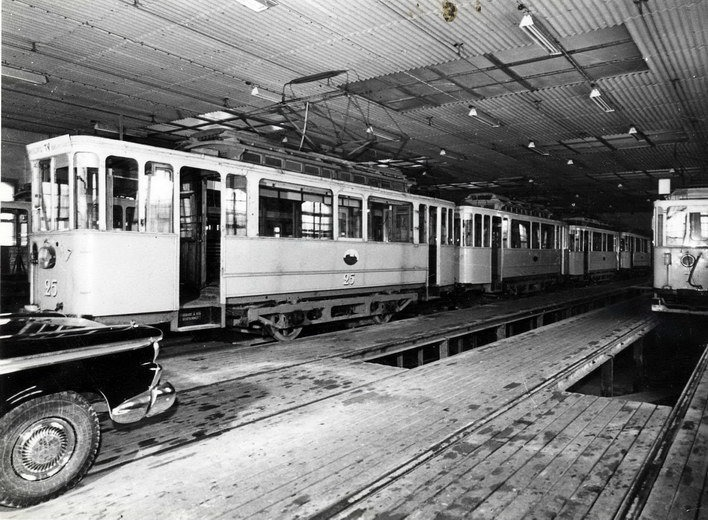
Homansbyen Depot in 1960

The installations of the depot were all built in brick and were rebuilt many times. The head office had two floors. The ground floor featured six rooms, four serving as offices. Stablemen and coaches occupied the other two rooms. The second floor consisted of apartments for the stable keeper and depot inspector and a laboratory for the horse veterinarian.

The stable originally had stalls for 116 healthy and 12 ill horses. The stable was insured for 12,000 Norwegian speciedaler, twice the amount for the head office building. The wagon depot had space for 28 trams and 16 sleds. The 16 sleds were purchased between 1875 and 1879, and replaced the horsecars during the winter. The forge had space for two smiths and featured a small room where the horses were shoed.

== Location ==
The depot was located in Sporveisgata, between Bergsliens gate and the street junction Pilestredet–Sporveisgata. The street Sporveisgata was in the beginning only a branch from Pilestredet, but it became a street in its own right in 1879, after the tramway installations had been constructed. While it was located in a branch to Pilestredet, the depot had Pilestredet 75 as its address. After the branch had its name changed to Sporveisgata, the address was renamed Sporveisgata 8.

Initially, the depot was located at the very end of the Homansbyen Line. Consequently, trams traveling to the depot had to run from the terminus Hygiea, via a curve from Josefines gate over Bislett and Pilestredet to Sporveisgata 8. Sporveisgata stretches from Bogstadveien in the south-east to Thereses gate in the north-west. As of 2021, the nearest tram stops to the depot are Bislett on the Ullevål Hageby Line and Rosenborg on the Briskeby Line.
