= Musculus =

Musculus may refer to:

- Andreas Musculus (1514–1581), German Lutheran theologian
- Heinrich Musculus (b. 1868), Swedish-Norwegian businessperson
- Wolfgang Musculus (1497–1563), German Reformed theologian
- Musculus (bivalve), a genus of mussels
- Balaenoptera musculus, the blue whale
- Mus musculus, the house mouse
