= Kampen Line =

Tram line in Oslo, Norway, 1900 to 1960

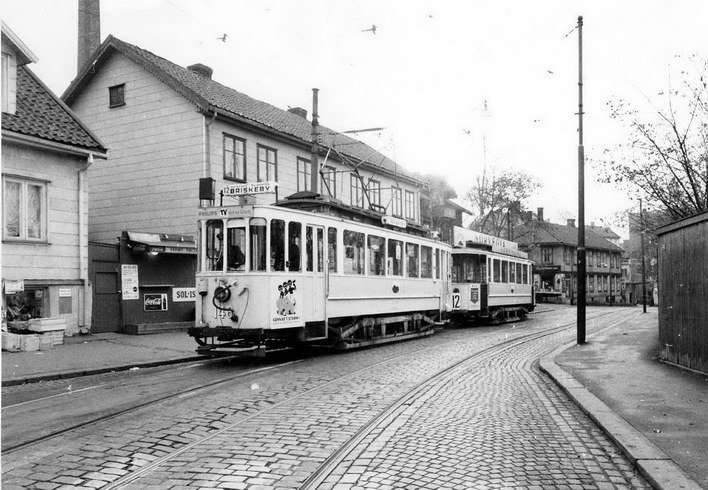
- Oslo Sporveier HaWa 146 on the Kampen Line, heading towards Brinken (terminus)

Overview
- Native name: Kampenlinjen
- Status: Abandoned
- Owner: Kristiania Sporveisselskab (1900-1924), Oslo Sporveier (1924-1960)
- Locale: Oslo, Norway
- Termini: Grønland; Brinken

Service
- Type: Tramway
- System: Oslo Tramway
- Operator(s): Kristiania Sporveisselskab (1900-1924), Oslo Sporveier (1924-1960)
- Rolling stock: Class SS

History
- Opened: 6 June 1900
- Closed: 30 October 1960

Technical
- Number of tracks: Double
- Electrification: 600 V DC Overhead catenary

Kampenlinjen (English: Kampen Line) was a tram line in Oslo that served Kampen in Gamle Oslo, on the eastern section of the city. The tramline was established by Kristiania Sporveisselskab in 1900 as a siding to the Gamlebyen Line from Grønland and up Motzfeldts gate, Tøyengata and Hagegata to Brinken. The section was a single track until 1921. The area is currently served by bus number 60 (Tonsenhagen-Vippetangen), at Kampen and Kampen Park

== Route ==
It ran northbound via Tøyengata from Grønland, while the runs ran parallel from where existing runs entered Tøyengata. Afterwards, it would run through Hagegata, before terminating at Brinken. When the Gamleby line got a new route through Schweigaards gate in 1957, it closed the line over Grønland in 1960. So when the line over Grønland closed, the Kampen Line was also closed.

== Depot ==
The tram depot at Kampen was located on a street called Hedmarksgata, and it was established in the 1920s. It was officially known as Vaalerengen Vognstasjon. They became disused in 1968, when the Kampen Line and the Vålerenga Line closed down as part of the City Council's gradual closing of the tramway. The depot was demolished in 1988.
