= Sagene Depot =

Norwegian disused tram depot

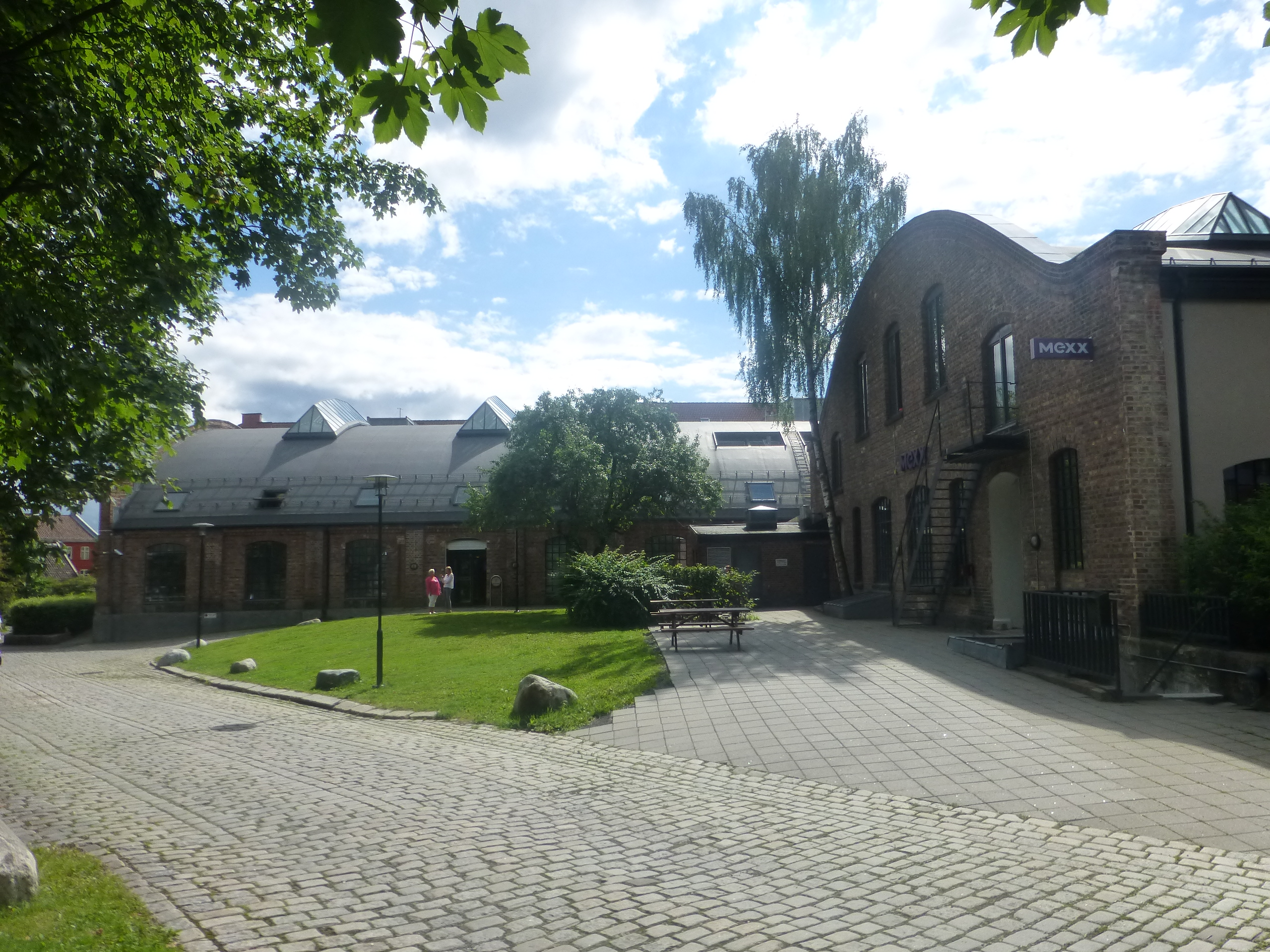
- The Sagene Depot in 2013

Location
- Location: Sagene, Norway

Characteristics
- Operator: Kristiania Kommunale Sporveie, Oslo Sporveier
- Type: Electric Tram
- Routes served: Sagene Ring

History
- Opened: 1902
- Closed: 1995
- Former rolling stock: Class S/SS, Gullfisk and Hoka

Sagene Depot (Norwegian: Sagene vognhall) is a disused, but not abandoned tram depot in Stockfleths gate at Sagene in Oslo, Norway. Two hall units, several apartments and offices, a forge and a workshop constitute the depot. The two hall units are preserved, and are now used as a cultural meeting place.

== History ==
In 1902, three years after the Sagene Line had opened, Kristiania Kommunale Sporveie built one hall unit for the tramway. An additional hall unit was later constructed.

== Facilities ==
There were two depots that were put up adjacent at Sagene. They were built at municipally owned ground and had places for 36 cars.

Next to the depot, a building with apartment and office was put up, constructed in brick. The depot chief lived in an apartment in the first stock.
