= Heinrich Musculus =

Swedish-Norwegian businessman

Heinrich Wilhelm Augustus Musculus
- Born: December 10, 1868; Germany
- Died: December 10, 1949 (aged 81)
- Occupation: businessman

Heinrich Wilhelm Augustus Musculus (10 December 1868 – 10 December 1949) was a Swedish-Norwegian businessman.

He was born in Germany, but hailed from Scania, and took education as a cement technician and construction engineer. He emigrated to Kristiania in Norway at the age of 22. After working one year in Slemmestad Fabrikker he started his own company in 1891. Among others, his company Christiania Cementstøperi, H. Musculus constructed a drydocks for Akers Mekaniske Verksted and a grain silo at Vippetangen. The company also traded in building tools, until 1923 when this business area was delegated to the company Christiania Cementstøperi, P. Paaske. He also owned the company Korkindustri with a factory in Gamlebyen, but it burned down in 1934.

Musculus co-founded the employers' association Entreprenørenes Landssammenslutning in 1910, and chaired it for the first ten years. He was a central board member of the Norwegian Employers' Confederation, and a member of the executive committee in the Federation of Norwegian Industries. He was also a board member of Norges Hypotekforening for Næringslivet.

He resided in Bestum. He donated stained glass windows to the transepts of Ullern Church, and to various other ends.
