= Falkenried =

German tram developer and manufacturer

- Company type: Subsidiary
- Industry: Rail transport, buses
- Founded: 1882; 144 years ago
- Defunct: 1999
- Headquarters: Hamburg, Germany
- Products: Trams; Buses; Rapid transit cars
- Parent: Hamburger Hochbahn

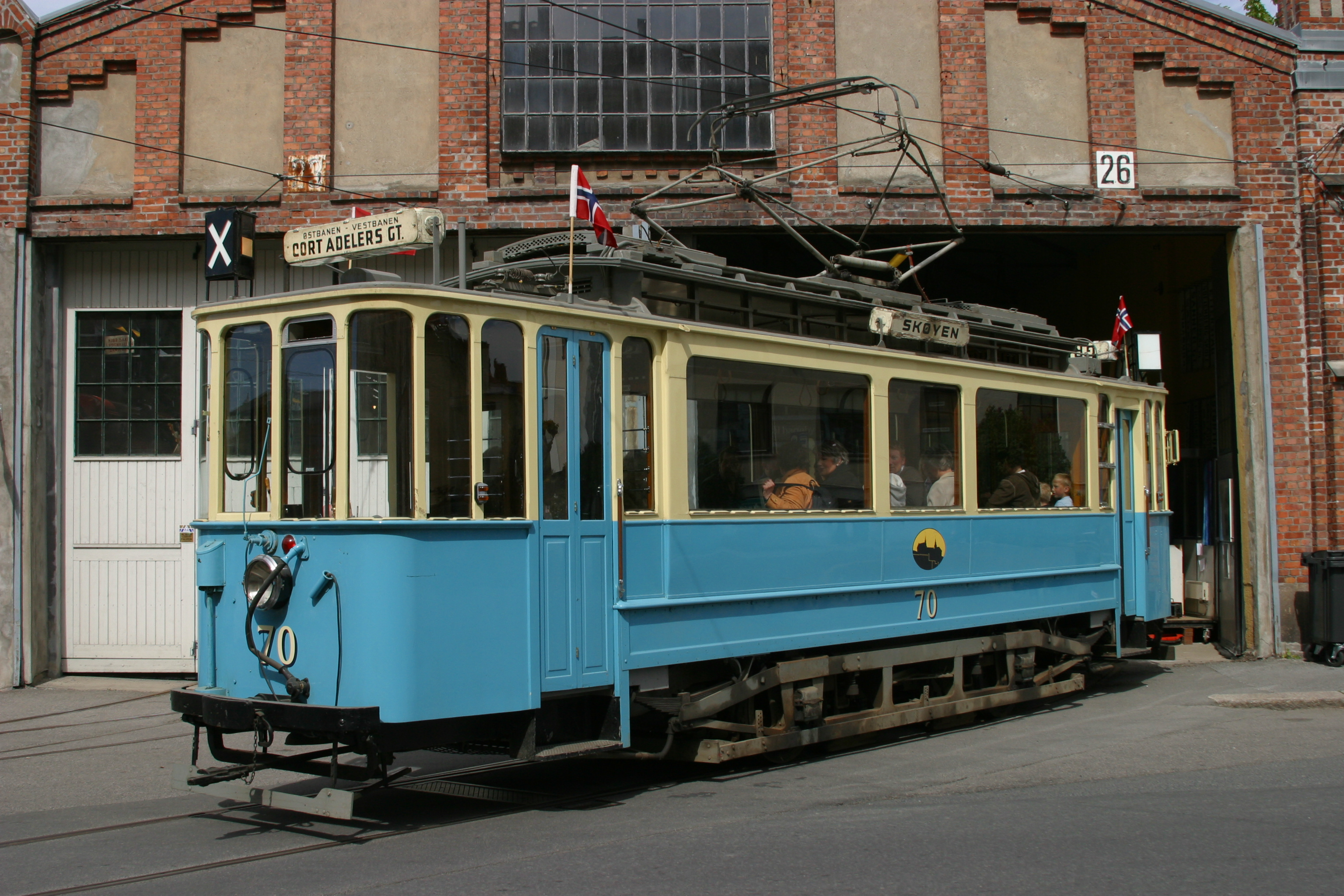
A heritage Falkenried tram in Oslo

Falkenried was a former tram and metro carriage developer and manufacturer (1882–1965) as well as a bus developer (until 1980) based in Hamburg, Germany.

In 1918, it became part of Hamburger Hochbahn plc, since June 1968, it is a subsidiary of it. The name Falkenried originates of the street in Eppendorf where the factory was situated (until 1999). Today it is a bus maintenance subsidiary of the Hochbahn located at the bus garage in Hummelsbüttel.

In 1897, the company made a delivery of fifteen horsecars to Kristiania Sporveisselskab of Oslo, Norway. They were 6.6 metres (22 ft) long and remained in service until 1939, although they were used as trailers most of their life. For Kristiania Elektriske Sporvei, the company built one tram and trailer in 1899, four trams in 1913/14 and two in 1925.

After the Hamburg Senate decided in the mid-1950s to replace the streetcar with a system of intermittent transport using subway trains and buses, attention turned even more to bus construction. The HHA's head of technology, O.W.O. Schultz drew up criteria for bus manufacturers at the end of the 1950s, according to which the buses should have the following features, among others: large destination displays (scroll bands with three-part line numbers) at the front, right and rear, raised exhaust pipes at the rear, a high roof (due to the interior height), folding doors that are flush with the outer wall (due to the automatic washing system) and (slightly) slanted windscreens (due to the lack of glare inside). According to these criteria, the bus manufacturers Büssing, Magirus-Deutz and MAN/Krauss-Maffei built at least prototypes as the "Hamburg type" and made them available to the HHA for testing. Subsequently, in the 1960s, the HHA ordered several series of the modified Magirus-Deutz Saturn II model (later designated 150 S 10) and two series of the Büssing 11 R/U 7 H in "Type Hamburg" design for service. The Bavarians developed the Metrobus from the MAN/Krauss-Maffei prototype.
