= Vippetangen Line =

Former line of the Oslo Tramway, Norway

Coordinates: 59.9029°N 10.7419°E

Overview
- Native name: Korntrikken
- Status: Abandoned
- Owner: Kristiania Kommunale Sporveie (1900–05); Kristiania Sporveisselskab (1905–24); Oslo Sporveier (1924–67)
- Locale: Oslo, Norway
- Termini: Tollbugata; Vippetangen

Service
- Type: Tram
- System: Oslo Tramway

History
- Opened: 28 August 1900
- Closed: 15 February 1967

Technical
- Track gauge: 1,435 mm (4 ft 8 1/2 in)
- Electrification: 600 V DC

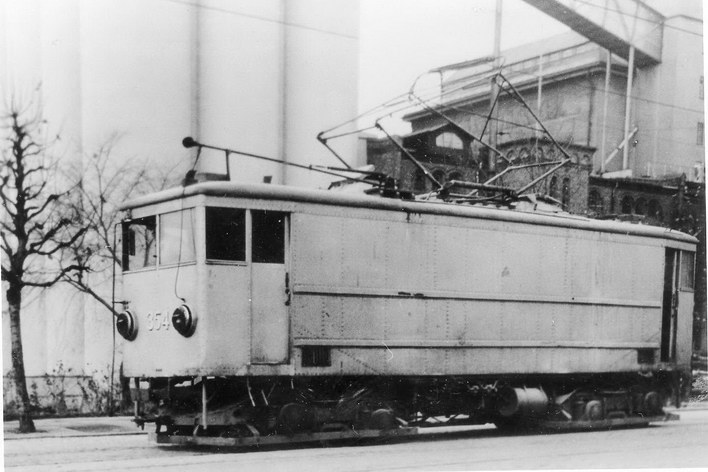
Oslo Sporveier. Tram motor vehicle type K no. 354, the "grain tram" in the unloading track at Bjølsen Valsemølle.

The Vippetangen Line or the Grain Tram (Norwegian: Korntrikken) is a former line of the Oslo Tramway, Norway, that ran from Tollbugata in the city center to Vippetangen between 1900 and 1967. It was built by Kristiania Kommunale Sporveie (KKS).

== History ==
The line was built as the third and final by the municipal Kristiania Kommunale Sporvei, opening on 28 August 1900. The service went through the city center to Athaeneum to St. Hanshaugen. The track was transferred to Kristiania Sporveisselskab (KSS) when it bought KKS in 1905, and again to Oslo Sporveier in 1924 when it took over KSS. Just after the KSS takeover the line was extended from Festningsbryggen to Vippetangen on 8 November 1905. The Vippetangen area is an important ferry quay and port that grew up, and both domestic and international ships provided the basis for passengers. Passenger transport was terminated in August 1964 as part of the plan to abandon the tramway network in Oslo.

From 1918 KSS started operating freight trams transporting grain from the silos at Vippetangen to the mills in Grünerløkka and Sandaker. Four passenger cars were rebuilt to carry the cargo, but in 1932 two specially built freight cars were built; the service was very profitable, and the mill company Bjølsen Valsemølle wanted to continue the service after, but road construction forced the tram line to be pulled up after the last service ran on 15 February 1967.

== Future plans ==
Though the old tracks have been razed, plans exist to build a new tramway to serve Vippetangen. The new line, that would be part of the "Fjord Line" would follow around the edge of the peninsula, instead of running through it. There are no specific dates for this expansion that is to become the main transport corridor through the urban renewal project named the Fjord City.
