= Vippetangen =

Coordinates: 59°54′10.386″N 10°44′30.700″E

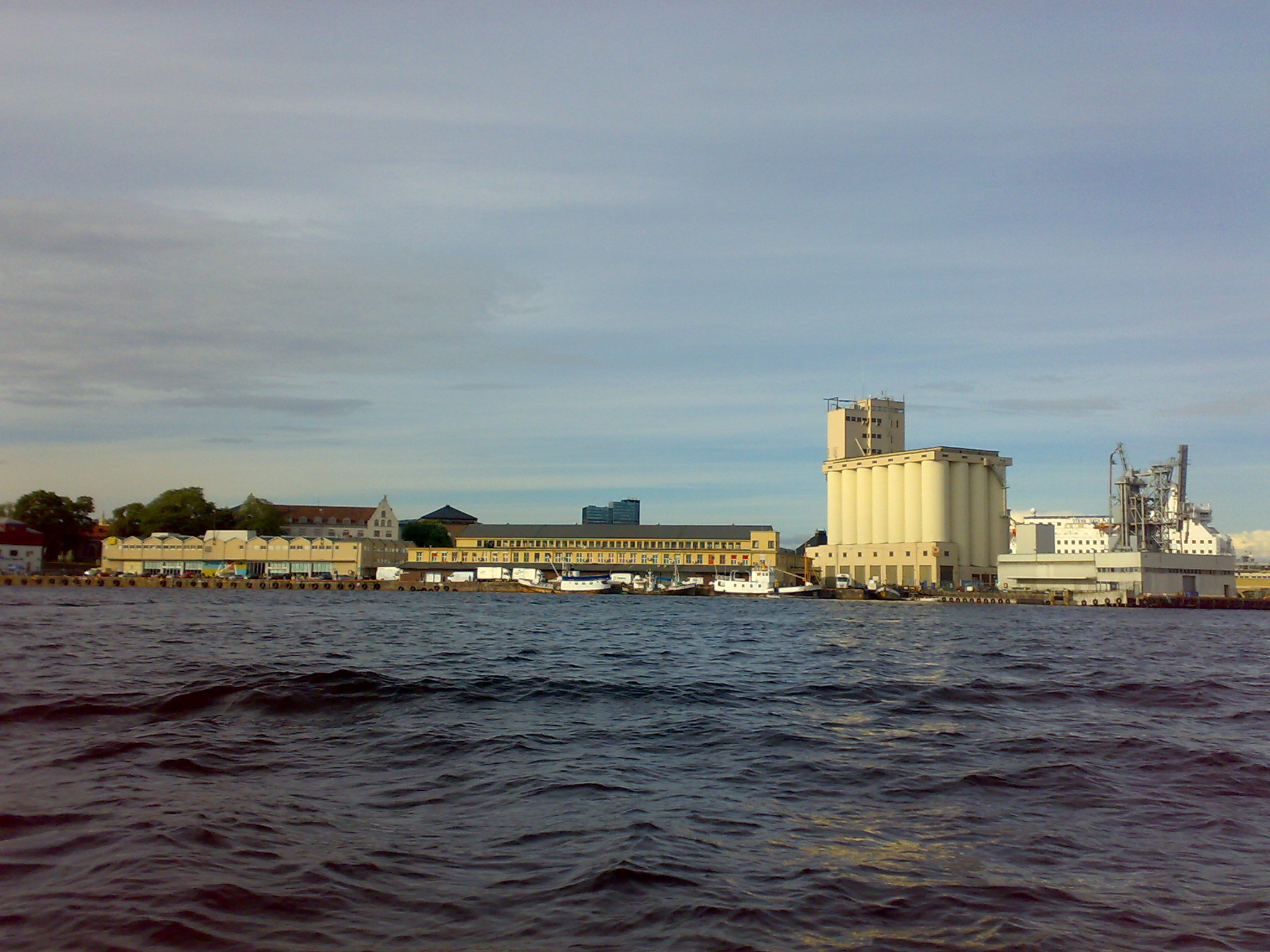
Vippetangen from south.

Vippetangen is the southern tip of the Akersnes peninsula in central Oslo, Norway, located southeast of Akershus Fortress and bounded on three sides by the Oslofjord. It has in the past served as an important part of the port of Oslo. The area is currently undergoing urban renewal as part of the Fjord City development.

== The name ==
The first element of the name is vippe (a shortening of vippefyr, or bascule light: a simple form of lighthouse that once stood there); the second element, tangen, means "the headland".

== History ==
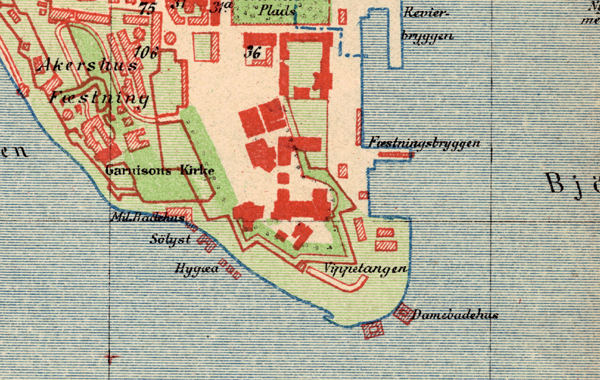
Map of Vippetangen, 1900

The place has been the location of a military facility and of a stone quarry, as well as military and civilian baths. In the 1880s and 1890s there was ice skating on the fjord, including the first national championships. The construction of modern dock facilities started in 1899, and on 25 November 1905 Vippetangen was the landing place for King Haakon VII and his family when they arrived from Denmark on the Norwegian warship Heimdal to assume the Norwegian throne. The port facilities included fishing facilities, docks for international passenger ships, and a grain silo. For more than 60 years grain was transported by tram via the Vippetangen Line to Nedre Foss Mill at Grünerløkka. The tram line had been built to Vippetangen by Kristiania Kommunale Sporveie in 1900, and remained in service until 1961. The Oslo Port Line railway also ran through the area.

== Fjord City development ==
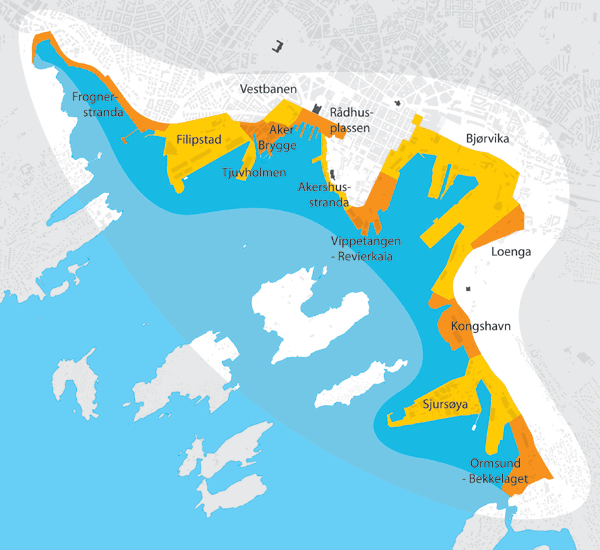
Vippetangen shown as part of the Fjord City project.

Vippetangen has always been an important transport hub, and remains the main port for passenger ferries in Oslo. This includes the Copenhagen ferry route operated by Stena Line and DFDS, and the water bus routes operated by Ruter to the Oslo Islands—these will remain after the development of the Fjord City as one of two ferry terminals in Oslo. As part of the Fjord City project Ruter is planning to build a new tram line to Vippetangen, following the peninsula around from Aker Brygge to Bjørvika.
