= Akersgata =

Street in Oslo, Norway

Coordinates: 59°54′57.2″N 10°44′42.5″E

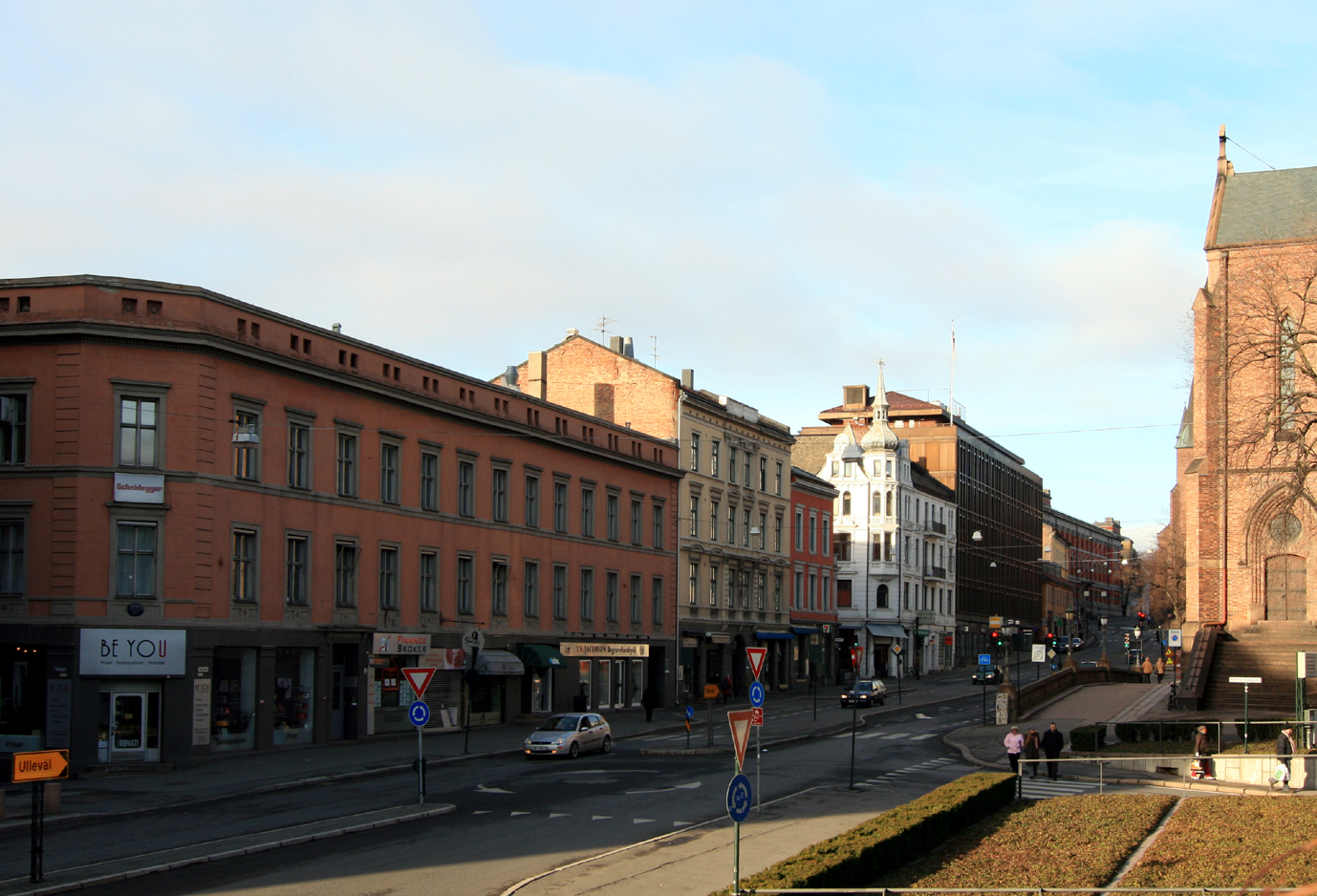
Akersgata at Teatergata, looking northward. The Trinity church is at the right.

Akersgata (1-73E, 2-74) is a street in Oslo, Norway. It contains a number of important buildings such as the Parliament of Norway Building, several government buildings in the Regjeringskvartalet, the Trefoldighetskirken (Trinity Church), and the Centralteatret.
