= Nils Carl Aspenberg =

Norwegian journalist

Nils Carl Aspenberg (born 26 August 1958) is a Norwegian journalist, historian, author and businessperson. He has written numerous books on rail transport, and is chief executive officer of Baneforlaget.

Aspenberg has a siviløkonom degree from BI Norwegian Business School. He worked as a conductor for Oslo Sporveier since 1980, and from 1981 tram and 1983-2003 subway engineer, as well as a bus driver since 1994. He has written more than thirty books on rail transport and local history and is owner of the publishing company Baneforlaget, which he founded in 1994. The company has published about 60 books. Aspenberg has been an active member of the Norwegian Railway Club, and was editor-in-chief of MJ-bladet from 1999 to 2003. He has also published the local history magazines Røakontakten from 1994 to 2008, and Langt Vest i Aker since 1997. He is also an editorial member of Lokaltrafikk and since 2013 also editor-in-chief. He is also an editorial member of Blickpunkt Straßenbahn and Store Norske Leksikon.

== Baneforlaget ==
Baneforlaget
- Company type: Private
- Industry: Publishing
- Headquarters: Svingen Terrasse 7 Oslo, Norway
- Area served: Norway
- Key people: Nils Carl Aspenberg (CEO)
- Parent: Nils Carl Aspenberg

Baneforlaget is a Norwegian publishing company based in Oslo. It published books in Norwegian and German about Norwegian and Scandinavian railways, including tramways and rapid transits. Owner, CEO and one of the most productive authors is Nils Carl Aspenberg.

== Publications ==
- Aspenberg, Nils Carl (1994). Glemte spor: boken om sidebanenes tragiske liv (in Norwegian). Oslo: Baneforlaget. ISBN 82-91448-00-0.
- —— (2001). Elektrolok i Norge (in Norwegian). Oslo: Baneforlaget. ISBN 82-91448-42-6.
