= Stortorvet tram stop =

Oslo tram station

Coordinates: 59°54′47″N 10°44′43″E

Stortorvet

General information
- Location: Sentrum, Oslo; Norway
- System: Tram or Light Rail stop
- Owner: Sporveien Trikken
- Operator: Ruter
- Bus routes: 1N (Night bus) (Ullerntoppen - Jernbanetorget); 2N (Night bus) (Østerås T - Ellingsrudåsen; 11N (Night bus) (Majorstuen - Kjelsås); 19N (Night bus) (Kringsjå - Åsbråten)

Other information
- Fare zone: Zone 1

Services
Preceding station	Trams in Oslo	Following station
Tinghuset towards Rikshospitalet	Line 17	Jernbanetorget towards Grefsen
Tinghuset towards Rikshospitalet	Line 18	Jernbanetorget towards Grefsen
Tinghuset towards Majorstuen	Line 19	Jernbanetorget towards Ljabru
Location

Stortorvet is a tram stop on the Oslo Tramway in Oslo, Norway. The station is located on the square Stortorvet in the city centre. It is served by the lines 17, 18 and 19. In 2009, it was decided to improve the square, the station and the tram tracks in the street. Stortorvet also has a balloon loop, so that trams terminating here can turn around.
