= Oslo Sporveier =

Defunct Norwegian transport company

AS Oslo Sporveier
- Company type: Municipally owned
- Industry: Public transport
- Predecessors: Kristiania Sporveisselskab; Kristiania Elektriske Sporvei
- Founded: 1 May 1924; 102 years ago
- Defunct: 1 July 2006; 19 years ago
- Fate: Demerger
- Successors: Oslo Public Transport Administration; Sporveien
- Headquarters: Oslo, Norway
- Number of employees: 1,053 (2026)
- Parent: City of Oslo
- Subsidiaries: Bærumsbanen; Ekebergbanen; Holmenkolbanen; Oslo Sporvognsdrift; Oslo T-banedrift; Sporveisbussene

AS Oslo Sporveier is a defunct municipal owned company responsible for public transport in Oslo, Norway. It was created in 1924 to take over the city's two private tram companies. In 1927 its started with bus transport, including from 1940 to 1968 trolleybuses. Since 1966 rapid transit and from 1985 water buses have also been operated by the company. It was split into two separate companies in 2006; Kollektivtransportproduksjon took over the operation while Oslo Public Transport Administration (who retained the Oslo Sporveier brand) was responsible for buying the services, fare regulation and marketing. The latter merged into Ruter in 2008, when the Oslo Sporveier brand was discontinued.

== History ==
=== It all started with trams ===
In 1875, Kristiania Sporveisselskab (KSS) started the first horsecar services in Oslo—at the time called Kristiania. It was followed by Kristiania Elektriske Sporvei (KES) who established electric tram services in 1894; by 1900 KSS had also converted its routes to electric traction. In 1899 the city council decided to also venture into the tram industry, and established Kristiania Kommunale Sporveie (KKS, translates Kristiania Municipal Tramway). This company was forced to rent some tracks in the city center from the other companies, and was also relegated to build less profitable lines; lack of profits made the city council sell KKS to KSS in 1905.

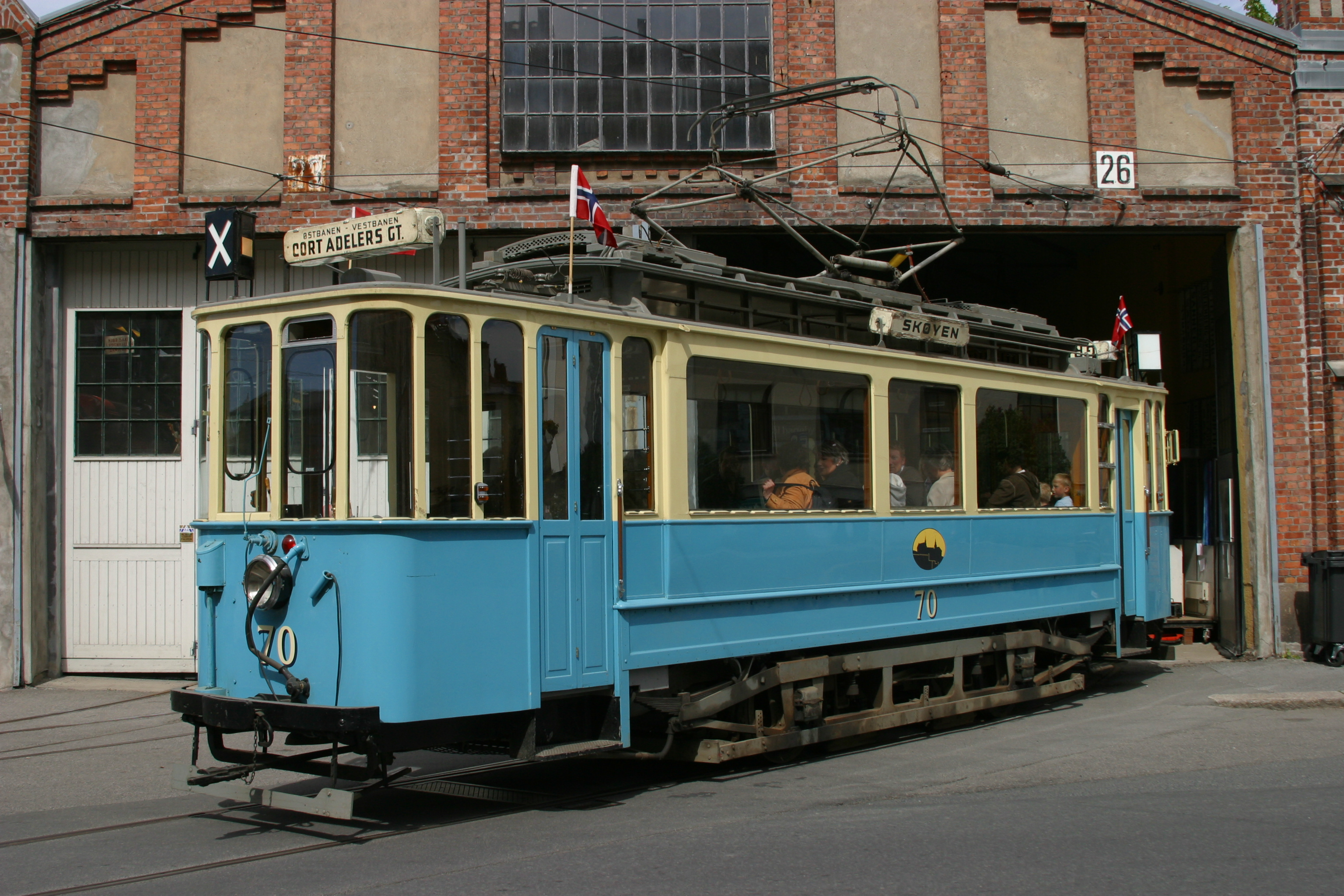
Heritage tram no. 70 that was inherited from KSS.

The city had granted a concession to the two private street companies until 1924, after which the city could expropriate the companies. Both companies where well run and highly profitable, and on 1 May 1924 KSS and KES were merged and taken over by the city council, giving the new company the name A/S Kristiania Sporveier. On 1 January 1925 the city changed its name to Oslo, with the company's name also changing. The suburban tramways operated by Holmenkolbanen and Ekebergbanen were not taken over, as was the Lilleaker Line operated by KES; the city council did not want to take over tram lines in the neighboring municipality of Aker.

The network taken over by Oslo Sporveier was extensive, consisting of the Vippetangen-, Vestbanen-, Homansbyen-, Sagene-, Grünerløkka–Torshov-, Rodeløkka-, Kampen-, Vålerenga- and Gamleby Line taken over from KSS and the Skøyen-, Frogner- and Briskeby Line taken over from KES. There was sufficient rolling stock from the two companies that Oslo Sporveier had a surplus; they had 148 cars, numbered 1–22 and 33–157, and 186 trailers, numbered 401–540 and 601–646—all the stock was double axled.

After the take-over Oslo Sporveier immediately started expanding the network; on 1 August 1925 the Homansbyen Line was extended from Adamstuen to Ullevål Hageby (becoming the Ullevål Hageby Line). Further expansions were the Kjelsås Line that opened on 25 September 1934 from Storo to Kjelsås and the expansion of the Sinsen Line from Sinsen to Carl Berners Plass. At this point the city has its most extensive tram network. The new company also decided that the permitted car width be 2.5 metres (8.2 ft), allowing wider suburban trams to run in the city streets. During the 1930 Oslo Sporveier decided they needed more rolling stock, and cooperated with Strømmens Værksted to create the Goldfish-series. Forty-six units were delivered in 1937–40, with twenty-four delivered in the street version, series E and twenty-two in the suburban version, series B. Built with an aluminum chassis, they were quick and light, with a distinct streamline shape, making them look like a goldfish.

=== Introduction of buses ===
Bus transport started in 1927 with line 18 between Kværner and Alexander Kiellands Plass. In 1931 the bus ring around the city is opened, and by 1937 Oslo Sporveier operated 113 vehicles. A test for the Oslo trolleybus service was performed in 1939; the breakout of World War II induced strict fuel rationing making it profitable for Oslo Sporveier to take into use trolleybuses using abundant electricity. In December 1940 the first trolleybus route opened, line 17 from served as a shuttle for the tram at Rodeløkka. Line 21 was the next to be converted—opening on 5 December 1943—running from Carl Berners Plass to Skillebekk, on route north of the city center. After sabotage against the a German aircraft engine facility co-located with the bus depot, line 17 was terminated on 21 August 1944 so the vehicles could be used on line 21.

After the war in 1946 Oslo Sporveier announced they would electrify three more bus lines; on 6 February 1949 ring line 20—from Majorstuen via Sagene and Carl Berners Plass to Galgeberg—and line 23, later renumbered 18, from Bjølsen to Lian Street, and expanded to Ekeberg Hageby on 11 June 1950. The last trolleybus route was line 24 converted on 20 May 1955 from Tåsen to the Eastern Railway Station. In total 72 trolleybuses, all built by Strømmen, were delivered.

=== Rapid post-war expansion ===
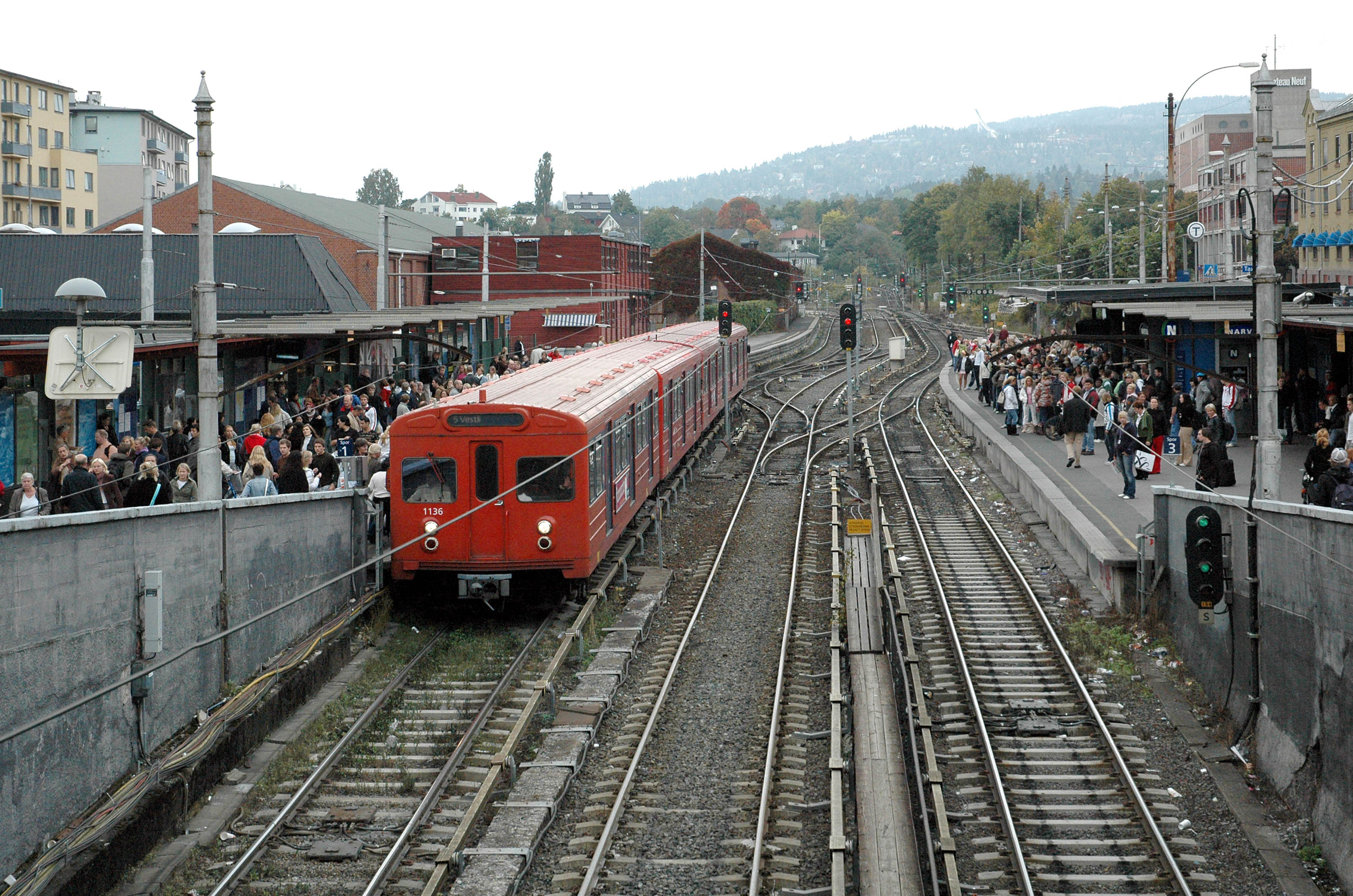
T1000 stock at Majorstuen.

On 1 October 1944, Oslo Sporveier bought Bærumsbanen and took over the operation of the Lillaker-, Ekeberg- and Østensjø Line. The municipalities of Oslo and Aker were merged 1 January 1948, and Aker's municipal tram company Akersbanerne was merged into Oslo Sporveier. This company did not operate any lines, instead it had a majority ownership in Holmenkolbanen that operated the four suburban lines in Western Oslo: the Holmenkoll Line, Sognsvann Line, Kolsås Line and Røa Line. The companies preferred shares were however still listed on the Oslo Stock Exchange.

On 15 September 1949, the Underground Railway Office (Tunnelbanekontoret) was established to start planning the Oslo Metro, a rapid transit system that would serve the new suburbs in Nordstrand and Groruddalen on the east side of town. The first part of the Common Tunnel had been opened in 1928 by Holmenkolbanen, and the plan was to build a through tunnel connecting the eastern and western suburban lines. The decision to build the T-bane was made by the city council in 1954; the Østensjø Line would be converted to metro standard, and three new lines would be built, with the Lambertseter Line opening as a suburban line on 28 April 1957.

The first closing of tram lines occurred in 1949; on 17 January the line to Korsvoll was closed, followed on 6 February the line to Rodeløkka. The line to Rodeløkka was not removed, and a new line opened on 2 January 1955. By 1960 the plans for the T-bane were in the works, and the city council decided to terminate all tram and trolleybus lines—replacing them with rapid transit and diesel buses. The closure would not be immediate; not until the tram and trolleybus vehicles were to be retired would lines be closed. Within a year the tram lines the Kampen-, Rodeløkka- and Vestbanen Line were closed, as were the trolleybus lines 18 and 24. The remaining two trolleybus routes were closed in 1967.

=== Tunneling the gaps ===
The first metro entered service on 22 May 1966 when the Lambertseter Line was converted and connected to the new tunnel leading to the Jernbanetorget Station. It was supplemented by the Grorud Line that opened on 16 October, and the Østensjø Line the next year. The first part of the Furuset Line was connected on 18 November 1970, and was followed by extensions to the lines throughout the 1970s until the opening of Ellingsrudåsen in 1981.

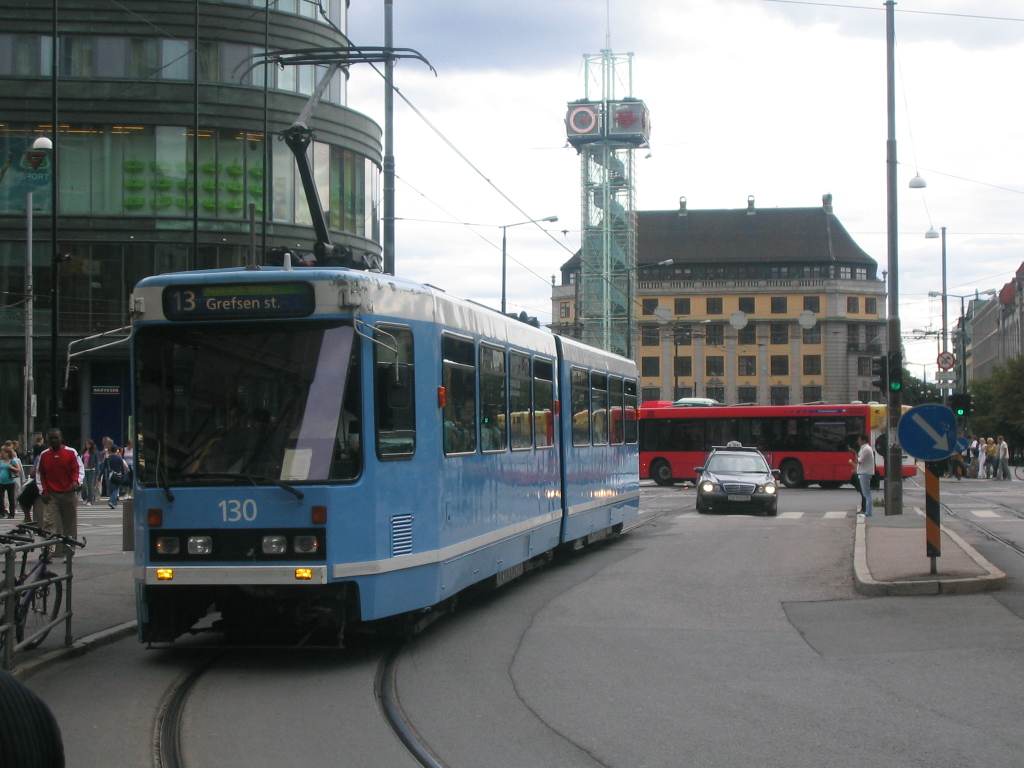
The SL79 trams were ordered in 1979 after the decision to keep the tramway.

The advent of the metro fueled the closing of tram lines, and in 1966 the connection between Grensen and Sagene closed, followed the next year by the Vippetangen Line (that since 1964 had been used for grain transport), the Helsfyr Line and the Simensbråten Line branch of the Ekeberg Line. The last closing of a tram line occurred on 24 June 1968 when the connection between Schewigaard Street and Etterstad was terminated. The tide changed in 1969 when the turning loop at Sinsen was needed to build the Sinsen Interchange—instead of closing the line a new loop was built at Muselunden. In 1972 the planned closing of the Ekeberg Line was canceled and remained, despite a new line needing to be built to allow passage during the construction of the central station.

In 1977 the city council changed their decision to close down the tramway, mostly due to the 1973 oil crisis. After no investments on the tramway for seventeen years, new stock had to be bought, and Oslo Sporveier opted for buying seven used M-23 units from the Gothenburg Tramway in Sweden. In addition twenty-five SL79 trams were delivered in 1982–83, followed by an additional fifteen in 1987, introducing articulated trams into the Oslo cityscape.

Another major goal of the metro was to connect the suburban lines on each side of the city through a tunnel, specifically the Common Tunnel. With the opening of the metro in 1966 only 1.2 kilometres (0.75 mi) was needed to establish a connection, yet not until 1977 did the new station Sentrum open, allowing the T-bane closer access to the city center. However, leaks forced the station to close in 1983, and not until 1987 did it reopen, this time also as the terminus for the western trams. Through running could not be accomplished until 1993, when parts of the western network had been upgraded to metro standard.

=== Light rails and demerging ===
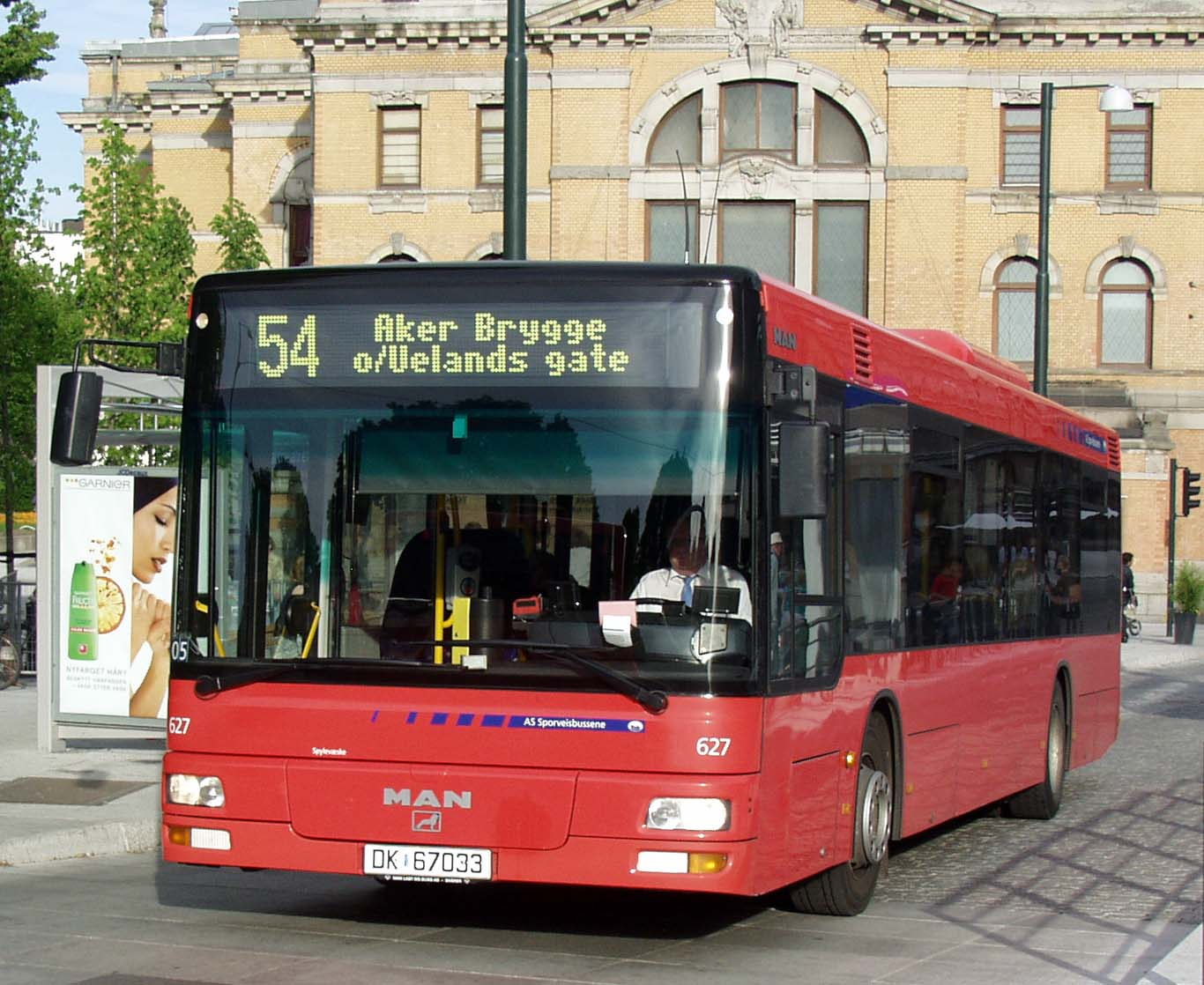
An Oslo Sporveier bus operated by the subsidiary Sporveisbussene.

In 1985 the water bus service is made part of the Oslo Sporveier network, though it remained operated by the private company Oslo Fergene. In 1991 the companies Ekebergbanen and Holmenkolbanen were merged into Oslo Sporveier, and until 2004 a few private owners had a very small ownership in Oslo Sporveier. Also in 1991 the first public service obligation was issued on the bus service. The next year the first low-floor buses entered service.

During the 1990s a number of expansions were made to the tram network. The disused line from Storo via the depot at Grefsen to Sinsen was taken into use in 1993. In 1995 the Vika Line was constructed to access Aker Brygge and in 1999 the Ullevål Hageby Line was extended to the new Rikshospitalet. For these new lines thirty-two SL95 low-floor trams, replacing all but the SL79 units, were delivered from 1996 to 2004.

On 1 July 2003 Oslo Sporveier is reorganized with the operation of the trams transferred to Oslo Sporvognsdrift and the operation of the metro to Oslo T-banedrift. Another reorganization was made on 1 July 2006 when Oslo Sporveier was demerged into two companies: the Oslo Public Transport Administration, that kept the Oslo Sporveier brand name, was made responsible for purchase and marketing of the public transport, while the operating was transferred to Kollektivtransportproduksjon. The brand name Oslo Sporveier was discontinued on 1 January 2008 when Ruter was created as a merger between it and Stor-Oslo Lokaltrafikk—who was responsible for public transport in Akershus.

== See also ==
- Timeline of transport in Oslo
- Trams in Oslo
