= List of Oslo Tramway and Metro operators =

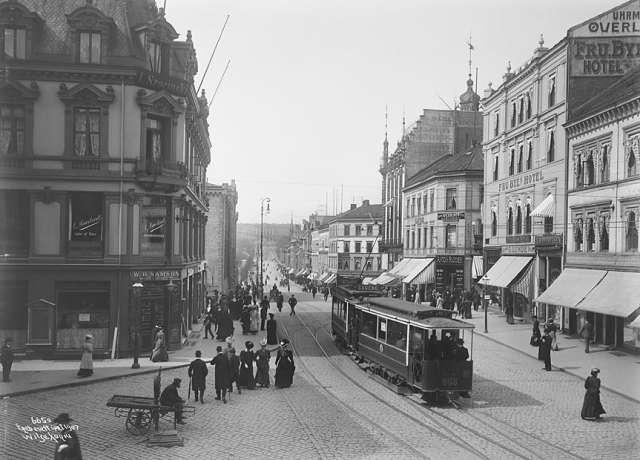
Kristiania Sporveisselskap trams at Egertorvet in 1907

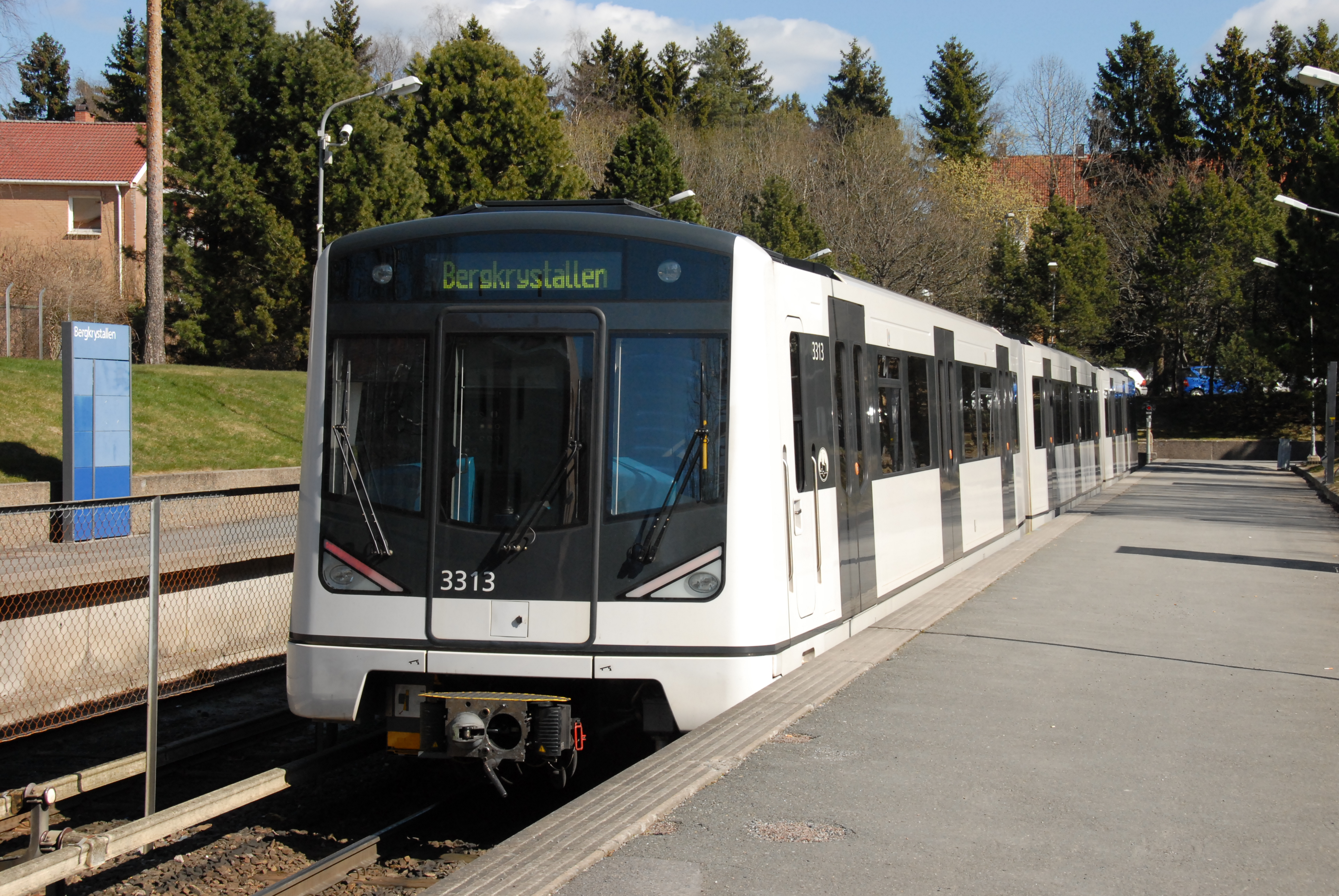
MX3000 metro train, owned by Oslo Vognselskap and operated by Oslo T-banedrift, at Bergskrystallen, a station owned by Kollektivtransportproduksjon

Map of the city center as of 1939, showing which tram company has built which line

The Oslo Tramway is a six-line tram and light rail network that serves the central parts of Oslo, Norway, of which three lines stretch into the suburbs. The Oslo Metro is a six-line rapid transit system that covers all boroughs of Oslo and some of western Bærum. Currently, the infrastructure of both systems is owned by the municipal company Sporveien (Kollektivtransportproduksjon). The tramway is operated by the subsidiary Sporveien Trikken (previously Oslotrikken), while the metro is operated by Sporveien T-banen (previously Oslo T-banedrift) and the rolling stock is owned by the subsidiary Oslo Vognselskap. All operations are conducted on contract with Ruter, the public transport authority for Oslo and Akershus, which operates the ticket system and manages public grants.

Throughout the history of the Oslo Tramway and Metro, 15 different companies have owned, constructed or operated parts or all of the network. The first street trams in Oslo were built by three different companies, each with their own network. The private Kristiania Sporveisselskab started with a horsecar service in 1875, but electrified their lines after Kristiania Elektriske Sporvei started with electric trams in 1894. Between 1899 and 1905, the municipality operated street trams through Kristiania Kommunale Sporveie. Starting in 1898, the private Holmenkolbanen, and later the municipal Akersbanerne and private Ekebergbanen, built suburban light rail systems. In 1924, the city took over the street trams and established Oslo Sporveier. After the municipal merger between Aker and Oslo in 1948, the Municipality of Oslo became the major stock holder of Holmenkolbanen. Bærumsbanen was taken over by Oslo Sporveier in 1944, and in 1971 disestablished. The private light rail lines were gradually nationalized and transferred to Oslo Sporveier, which operated the entire network by 1975. The metro was established in 1966 and was operated by Oslo Sporveier, which also operated the city's buses and contracted the ferries.

From 2003 to 2008, the operations were again split. In 2003, the operations of the trams and metro trains were transferred to Oslotrikken (originally named Oslo Sporvognsdrift) and Oslo T-banedrift, respectively. In 2006, Oslo Sporveier was split into the infrastructure company Kollektivtransportproduksjon and a public transport authority, the latter of which kept the Oslo Sporveier name. From 2007, the ownership of the trams and trains was transferred to Oslo Vognselskap. In 2008, Oslo Sporveier merged with its Akershus counterpart, Stor-Oslo Lokaltrafikk, to create Ruter.

== Operators ==
The following table lists companies involved in the operation of the Oslo Tramway and the Oslo Metro. Infrastructure owners (denoted as "infrastructure") only own track and station, leasing these to other companies; if the lessors only operate trains, and have no track themselves, they are operators (denoted as "operator"). Transit authorities (denoted as "authority") do not perform any operations, instead managing tickets and fares, including transfers, marketing and subsidies. Rolling stock owners (denoted as "rolling stock") own the trains and trams, which are leased to an operator. Integrated companies (denoted "integrated") manage all before-mentioned aspects.

The list further specifies the lines or category of lines the company operated, the company's owner, the year the company commenced operations (denoted "com" - which may or may not be the same year the company was established), the year the company ceased operations (although the formal termination of the company may have occurred later) and the successor company. Lines which are no longer in use and light rails which would later be upgraded by Oslo Sporveier to metro are both noted, as are companies owned by Oslo Municipality via Sporveien.

| † | Line is no longer in use |
| * | Line would later be upgraded to metro |
| # | Company only operated these lines, and did not own them |
| ¤ | Owned by Oslo Municipality via Sporveien |

| Company | Type | Lines | Owner | Com | Ceased | Successor | Ref |
|---|---|---|---|---|---|---|---|
| Akersbanerne | Infrastructure | Lilleaker; Skøyen; Kolsås*; Røa*; Sognsvann*; Østensjø* | Aker Municipality | 1917 | 1949 | Oslo Sporveier | |
| Bærumsbanen | Operator | Lilleaker; Skøyen; Kolsås*; Østensjø* | Private | 1924 | 1971 | Oslo Sporveier | |
| Ekebergbanen | Integrated | Ekeberg; Simensbråten^{†} | Private | 1924 | 1969 | Oslo Sporveier | |
| Holmenkolbanen | Integrated | Holmenkollen*; Røa*^{#} Sognsvann*^{#} | Private | 1898 | 1975 | Oslo Sporveier | |
| Kristiania Elektriske Sporvei | Integrated | Skøyen; Lilleaker; Briskeby; Frogner | Private | 1894 | 1924 | Oslo Sporveier | |
| Kristiania Kommunale Sporveie | Integrated | Vippetangen; Sagene; Rodeløkka | Oslo Municipality | 1899 | 1905 | Kristiania Sporveisselskab | |
| Kristiania Sporveisselskab | Integrated | Vestbanen^{†} Homansbyen; Gamlebyen; Ullevål Hageby; Vippetangen^{†} Vålerenga^{†} Kampen^{†} Grünerløkka–Torshov; Sagene^{†} Sinsen | Private | 1875 | 1924 | Oslo Sporveier | |
| Oslo Sporveier | Integrated | All | Oslo Municipality | 1924 | 2006 | Kollektivtransportproduksjon; Oslotrikken; Oslo T-banedrift; Ruter | |
| Oslo Vognselskap | Rolling stock | All | Oslo Municipality^{¤} | 2007 | — | — | |
| Ruter | Agency | All | Oslo Municipality (60%); Akershus County Municipality (40%) | 2008 | — | — | |
| Smestadbanen | Infrastructure | Røa* | Private | 1912 | 1922 | Akersbanerne | |
| Sporveien | Infrastructure | All | Oslo Municipality | 2006 | — | — | |
| Sporveien Trikken | Operator | Tram lines | Oslo Municipality^{¤} | 2003 | — | — | |
| Sporveien T-banen | Operator | Metro lines | Oslo Municipality^{¤} | 2003 | — | — | |
| Tryvandsbanen | Infrastructure | Holmenkollen* | Private | 1915 | 1920 | Holmenkolbanen | |
