= Rodeløkka Line =

Former line of the Oslo Tramway, Norway

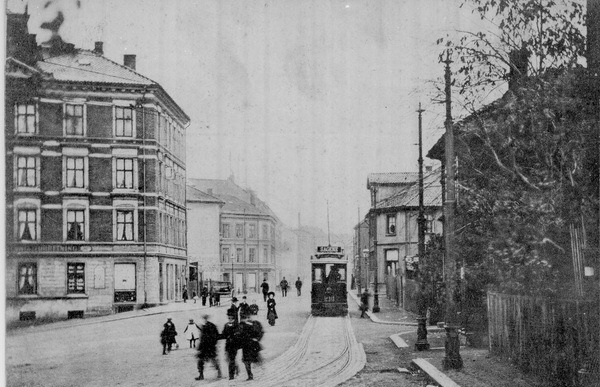
- A tram in Verksgata some time between 1900 and 1910

Overview
- Native name: Rodeløkkalinjen
- Owner: Oslo Sporveier
- Locale: Oslo, Norway

Service
- Type: Tramway
- System: Oslo Tramway
- Operator(s): Oslo Sporveier

History
- Opened: 23 March 1900
- Closed: 23 April 1961

Technical
- Number of tracks: Double
- Track gauge: 1,435 mm (4 ft 8 1/2 in)
- Electrification: 600 V DC

The Rodeløkka Line (Norwegian: Rodeløkkalinjen) is a former line of the Oslo Tramway of Norway. It was in use from 1900 to 1961, serving the neighborhood of Rodeløkka. After closing, the southern part of the line was designated as part of the Sinsen Line. The Rodeløkka Line was built by Kristiania Kommunale Sporveie (KKS) in 1900, and was subsequently taken over by Kristiania Sporveisselskab (KSS) in 1905. In 1924, the ownership was transferred to Oslo Sporveier. It was served by Line 9 until 1949, when it was replaced by a bus service. In 1955, a new route from Carl Berners plass to Rodeløkka was built, and the line was served by Line 13 until 1961, when the service was terminated. The tracks were removed between 1962 and 1964.

== Route ==
In 1899, Oslo Municipality established KKS to build and operate three tram lines. The second line to open was the Rodeløkka Line on 23 March 1900, which connected to the KSS-owned Grünerløkka–Torshov Line at Nybrua near Hausmanns gate. The line was built as double track until Tromsøgata. It ran along Trondheimsveien before it branched off at Helgesens gate towards Rodeløkka; it followed Rathkes gate, Verksgata and Københavnsgata before reaching Dælenenggata. Here, a small depot was built with place for six cars. On 26 January 1901, a new connection line through Dronningens gate was built from Tollbugata to Kirkeristen, and the company no longer needed to lease tracks from Kristiania Elektriske Sporvei in the city center. KKS was bought by KSS in 1905.

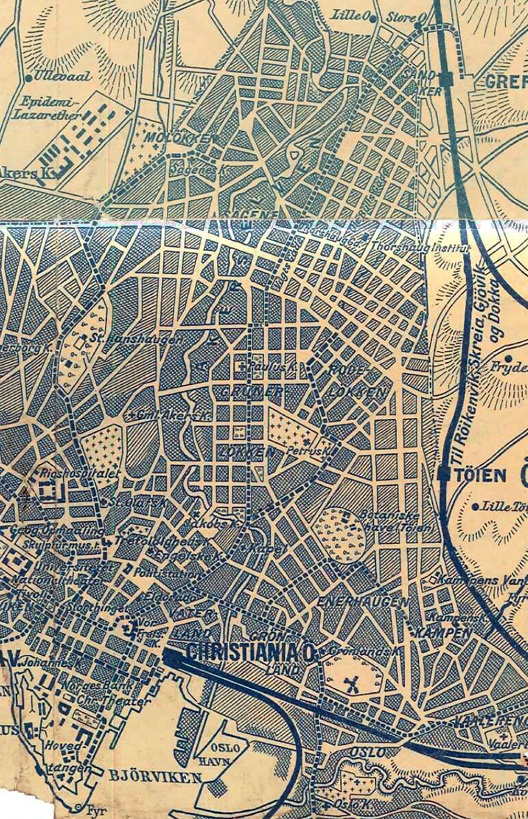
A historic map showing the Rodeløkka Line and some other lines of the Oslo Tramway

The Sinsen Line opened on 1 February 1923 as a branch of the Rodeløkka Line, which continued along Trondheimsveien to Carl Berners plass. The entire Rodeløkka Line was rebuilt with double track in 1938. In December 1940, a service extension of the Rodeløkka Line was built from Rodeløkka to Søndre Åsen, operated by the Oslo trolleybus, remaining in service until 14 January 1945. The tram service on the Rodeløkka Line was terminated on 6 February 1949, and replaced with bus line 27, although the tracks were kept.

A new line to Rodeløkka was opened on 3 January 1955. The bus operation had been more expensive than the tram, and a double track line was built from Carl Berners plass through Dælenenggata to Rodeløkka. The balloon loop was built around the block of Dælenengata, Fagerheimgata, Marstrandgata and Københavngata. The line was connected to the old Rodeløkka Line with a triangular loop in Københavngata. On 23 April 1961, all traffic on the Rodeløkka Line was terminated. The tracks were removed between 1962 and 1964.

== Service ==
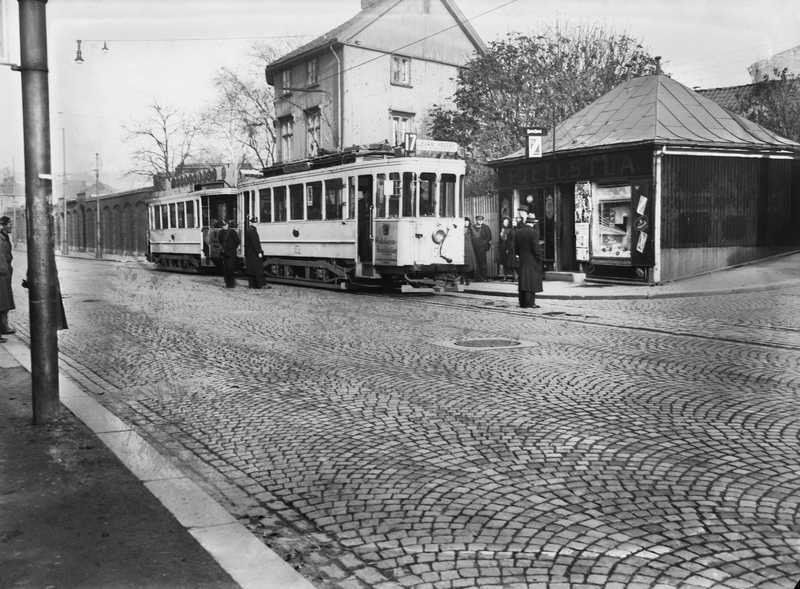
Tram at Verksgata in 1939

The line was originally connected to Egertorget via Stortorvet. After the line was taken over by KSS, it was given service number 9 and operated with a twelve-minute headway, connecting via the city center to Skøyen on the Skøyen Line. When the Sinsen Line opened, the southern part of the Rodeløkka was also served by Line 13, which gave a six-minute headway south of Helgesens gate. From 29 June 1924, after the takeover of Oslo Sporveier, the headway was changed to fifteen minutes. From 29 May 1927, Line 13 was replaced with Line 12, and from 19 June, Line 9 became Line 17, which continued along the Ullevål Hageby Line on the other side of the city center. From 19 January 1937, the Sinsen service was also operated by Line 3. From 10 December 1939, Gullfisk trams were put into service on the Sinsen services. With the reopening of the Rodeløkka Line in 1955, the service was taken over by Line 13, which used SM53 trams. Ridership on the new line was less than predicted, and from 1959, the line was only served during rush-hour and started to turn at the Eastern Railway Station in the city center.
