= OS T2000 =

Former Oslo Metro rolling stock

T2000
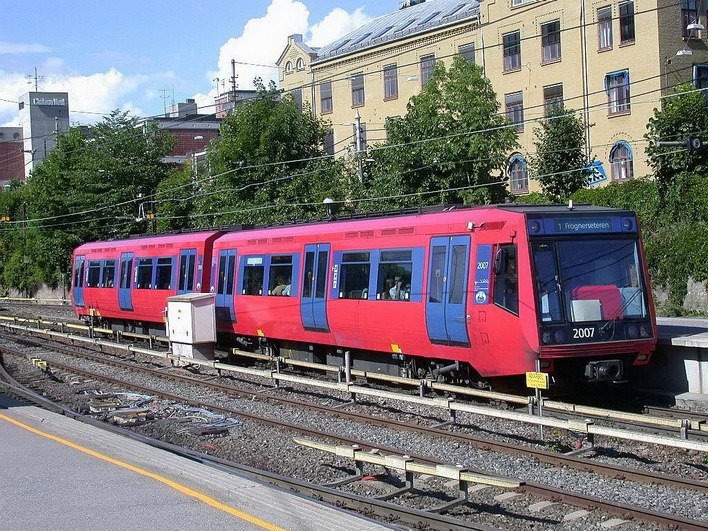
- T2000 at Majorstuen
- In service: 1994–2009
- Manufacturers: Strømmens Verksted and AEG
- Number built: 12 units (6 sets)
- Formation: 2 cars per trainset
- Capacity: 185 (60 seats)
- Operator: Oslo T-banedrift
- Line served: Holmenkollen Line

Specifications
- Train length: 36 m (118 ft 1 in)
- Car length: 18 m (59 ft 1 in)
- Width: 3.3 m (10 ft 10 in)
- Height: 3.65 m (12 ft 0 in)
- Maximum speed: 100 km/h (62 mph)
- Weight: 31 t (31 long tons; 34 short tons)
- Traction system: AEG GTO–VVVF
- Traction motors: 8 × 143 kW (192 hp)
- Power output: 1,144 kW (1,534 hp)
- Electric system: 750 V DC
- Current collection: Contact shoe / Pantograph
- UIC classification: Bo′Bo′+Bo′Bo′
- Safety system: ATP
- Coupling system: Scharfenberg
- Track gauge: 1,435 mm (4 ft 8 1/2 in) standard gauge

T2000 was an electric train formerly used on the Oslo Metro of Oslo, Norway. Six double-car multiple units were built by Strømmens Verksted and AEG in 1994. Each was 18 metres (59 ft) long, and could carry 185 passengers, of which 60 could be seated in two compartments per car. The maximum speed was 100 km/h (62 mph). Bought by Oslo Sporveier, they were owned by Kollektivtransportproduksjon, and operated by Oslo T-banedrift.

The T2000 operated on Line 1 of the T-bane, and replaced the aging HkB 600 teak wagons used on the Holmenkoll Line. The units were equipped with both third rail and overhead wire collectors, so they could operate on the Common Line and on the Holmenkoll Line. The trains were a prototype for a new design intended to replace the aging T1000 stock, but the MX3000 was chosen instead, as the T2000 did not perform satisfactorily. The T2000 were taken out of service in 2009.

== Background ==
When Holmenkolbanen, the operator of the Holmenkoll Line, was merged into Oslo Sporveier in 1975, plans were put in place to replace the old teak cars with faster units that could operate from Nationaltheatret to Frognerseteren in 25 minutes—allowing a turn-around time of one hour. At the time there had been two separate pools of trains for the eastern and western networks. On the eastern metro, the T1000 units were in use, while the western network was using older material. During the 1980s, some T1000 stock had been rebuilt with pantograph, and taken into use on the western network.

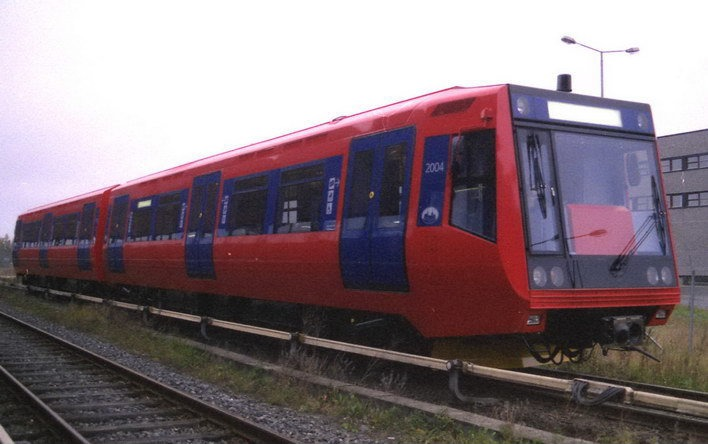
Brand-new T2000 at Ryen in 1994

Oslo Sporveier was highly satisfied with the SL79 articulated trams that had been delivered during the 1980s. In 1985, work started on the development of a modified version for the western suburban lines. The stock on the Holmenkoll and Kolsås Line was the first that needed to be replaced. The new stock was considered to be a limited trial. If it met performance expectations, future orders could be made to replace the T1000 stock when the latter reached the end of its economical life in around 2000. The required specification for the new train was published in October 1988.

On 22 October 1987, a fatal accident occurred when one of the old HkB 600 units suffered a catastrophic failure of its braking system, and rolled down the Holmenkoll Line, finally tipping over at Midtstuen. One person was killed and four were seriously injured, leading to a safety inspection of the old teak cars used on the line; the HkB 600 units were withdrawn from service, but were reintroduced after some refits.

The initial proposal had called for 22 units, to replace all of the Kolsås and Holmenkoll Line stock. However, the Sognsvann and Røa Line was upgraded to metro standard between 1992 and 1995, and could start using T1000 stock with only third-rail support. At the time, the eastern network used third-rail, while the western network used overhead wire. The upgrade used non-utilised stock, so the order for T2000 was reduced to 12 units.

== Construction ==
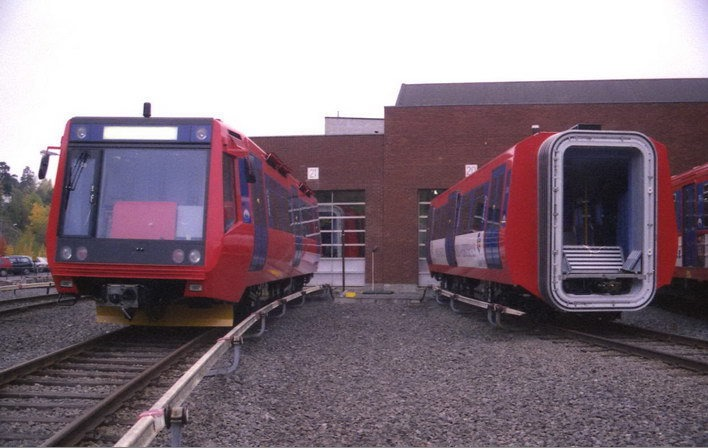
A split unit at Ryen in 1994

The order was placed with ABB Strømmen and AEG in August 1991. The high development cost was subsidised by the Norwegian government, who saw the project as potentially establishing a new industrial export product. Electrical components were built by AEG in Berlin, while the bogies were built by MAN in Nuremberg. The bodywork was built at Strømmen, with profiles from Alusuisse, and the trains were assembled in Strømmen.

The six two-car sets were delivered between 2 November and 22 December 1994. The first official public presentation was made on 8 December, but the units did not enter regular service until April 1995. The cars were numbered 2001–2012. In 1995, a unit was test-run in Paris during an International Association of Public Transport convention.

== Specifications ==
Each car's aluminum body was 18 m (59 ft 1 in) long, 3.65 m (12 ft 0 in) high and 3.3 m (10 ft 10 in) wide. The latter was 100 mm (3.9 in) wider than the HkB 600, since the new trains would no longer have ski boxes on the outside. The empty weight of a car was 31 t (31 long tons; 34 short tons). Capacity was for 60 seated and 125 standing passengers. There was a driver's cabin at one end of each car. Passengers sat in two compartments; the forward had conventional 2+2 seating, while the back section had 1+2+1 seating with two aisles. Wagon 2012 was delivered with 2+3 seating in the forward section. Each car had three doors on each side.

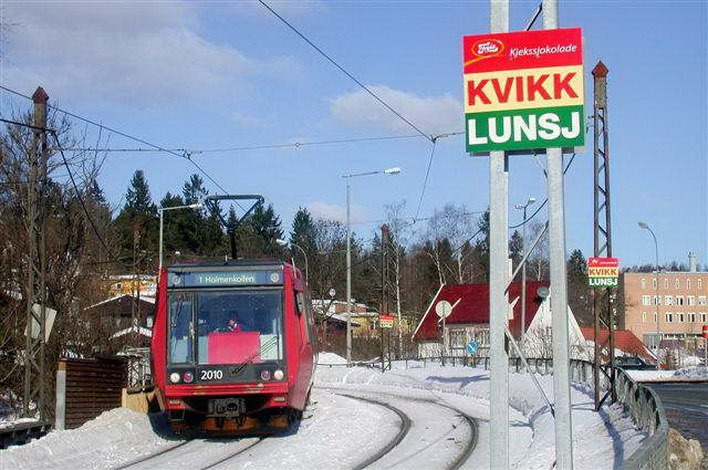
A unit on the Holmenkollen Line

Both cars had two bogies, with power on all axles, giving a Bo′Bo′ wheel arrangement. Four traction motors, each of 143 kW (192 hp), powered the car, giving a top speed of 100 km/h (62 mph) and an acceleration of 1.3 m/s^{2} (4.3 ft/s^{2}). The trains were equipped with both pantograph and contact shoe, the current for both of which is supplied at 750 volt direct current. The trains could not be connected for multiple running with the T1000 trains.

== Legacy ==
The T2000 class was prone to technical problems, and was not as reliable as the older T1000 stock. It soon became evident that no more would be ordered. The Norwegian State Railways had been considering a modified version for use on the Flåm and Voss Lines, but those plans were also soon abandoned. Another possibility considered was to build modified T2000 cars for use on the Oslo Metro Ring Line; at the time it was planned that the Ring Line would share track with the mainline Gjøvik Line at Grefsen, so the Oslo Metro rolling stock using this section would need to be able to support 15 kV 16.7 Hz AC. However, a parallel section of dedicated metro track was built instead, at Grefsen.

Oslo Sporveier opted for the all-new MX3000 from Siemens as a replacement for the T1000 stock instead of the T2000. Although its design was found to be unsuitable, the T2000 was initially not planned to be replaced by the MX3000, as the line was to remain with overhead wires and none of the new MX3000 trains are equipped with pantographs. However, following Oslo's decision to host the FIS Nordic World Ski Championships 2011, it was decided to upgrade the Holmenkollen Line to full metro standard, allowing longer than two-car trains. A proposal to downgrade the line to light rail standard and make it part of the Oslo Tramway was rejected.

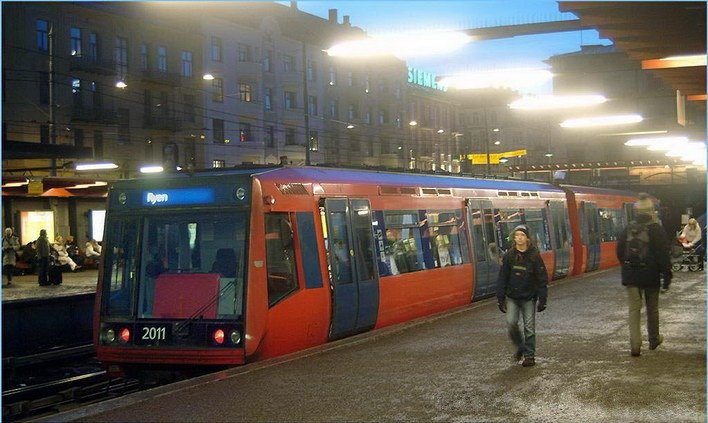
T2011 at Majorstuen

In 2009, all twelve T2000 units were taken out of service, before the last of the much older T1300. Kollektivtransportproduksjon, the successor of Oslo Sporveier, stated that procuring spare parts was becoming nearly impossible and that the small size of the series forced high maintenance costs. The initial orders for MX3000 trains did not call for sufficient numbers to replace the T2000. Kollektivtransportproduksjon has estimated the cost of renovating the units so they can run for 15 more years at NOK 50 million. Alternatively, the city council has been recommended by Kollektivtransportproduksjon to purchase 15 new MX3000 three-car trains for NOK 250 million.

In 2010, Ruter decided to scrap all of the T2000 wagons, after only 16 years in operation, and ten of the wagons were sold for NOK 100,000 a piece to the recycling company Hellik Teigen at Hokksund. The two remaining wagons will be preserved and displayed at the Oslo Tramway Museum. Ruter stated that it would cost about NOK 50 million to keep them in operation. Nevertheless, Ruter was in 2011 forced by the owner Oslo Vognselskap to keep renting the wagons for 22 million NOK each year, even though they were not in operation. Oslo Vognselskap stated the reason behind this was the contract which lasted for 30 years.
