= Kristiania Kommunale Sporveie =

Defunct tram operator in Oslo, Norway

- Type: Municipal owned
- Industry: Transport
- Founded: 1899
- Defunct: 1905
- Fate: Acquisition
- Successor: Kristiania Sporveisselskab
- Headquarters: Oslo, Norway
- Parent: Oslo Municipality

Kristiania Kommunale Sporveie or KKS, colloquially known as the Red Tramway (Norwegian: Rødtrikken) was a municipal owned company that operated parts of the Oslo Tramway from 1899 to 1905. KKS built and operated three lines, Sagene Ring, the Rodeløkka Line and the Vippetangen Line. The three were connected by means of lines of Kristiania Sporveisselskab (KSS) and Kristiania Elektriske Sporvei (KES). KKS bought twenty motorized trams from Schuckert & Co. and twelve trailers, designated as Class S. It built two depots, Sagene and Rodeløkka.

The company was created after a political shift whereby the municipal council decided to start operating trams. The company operated a mix of line services, most of the lines operating every ten minutes. KKS failed to make a profit. After the 1904 elections the majority in the municipal council shifted. The company was privatized in May 1905 and sold to KSS after the municipal council had rejected purchasing the very same company.

== History ==
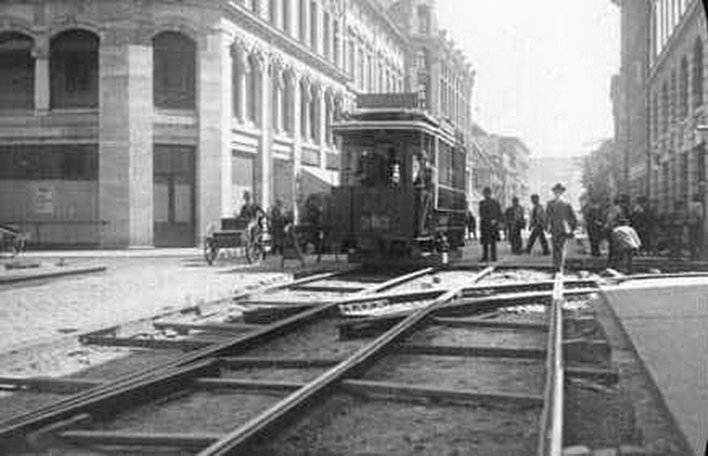
Laying of tracks of Sagene Ring in Akersgata

=== Establishment ===
By the late 1890s Oslo had three private tram companies, of which two, Kristiania Sporveisselskab and Kristiania Elektriske Sporvei, operated each their network of street trams. This led to a debate of whether tram operation should be a private or a municipal affair. The two dominant parties too each their stand: the Conservative Party wished to retain the private operations, while the Liberal Party supported a municipalization of the operations. The issue was split: Oslo Municipality taking over the existing two companies and establishing a new company to operate new lines. The municipality had in 1896 been offered to purchase KSS for its nominal share value plus interest in a move initiated by the tram company itself. Its main concern was its concession would expire in 1905 and that the municipality would then have the right expropriate it. Meanwhile, the company was in need of new capital and offered to issue new shares to the municipality. Oslo Municipality rejected the offer and the new shares were instead sold to Gesellschaft für elektrische Unternehmungen of Berlin.

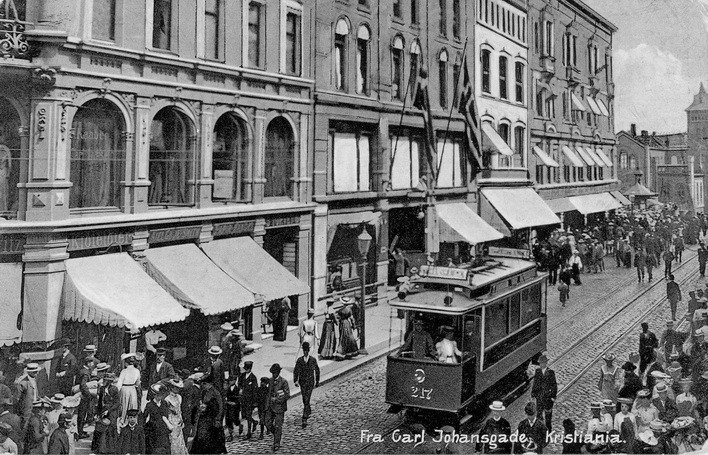
KKS tram running through Karl Johans gate

By 1897 the Liberal Party had received a majority in the municipal council. That year there was a political debate regarding an expansion of the KSS' tramway towards St. Hanshaugen and Sagene, two areas which were being developed. KSS applied to build a tramway there, but on 23 September 1897 the municipal council voted to establish its own tram company and build a line to St. Hanshaugen Sagene itself.

Two city engineers were sent on a study tour of Germany and the Netherlands to gain experience from tram operations there. Upon their return a second debate started, this time concerning the construction of a line to Rodeløkka. As before, KSS had applied to build a line from the city center to Rodeløkka. Initially this had been accepted by the municipal council in 1898, on the condition that KSS pay a rent of 5,000 Norwegian krone (NOK) per year. This decision was overturned in January 1899 and the municipal council voted to grant KKS the permit. There were doubts as to the profitability of the line, but the city engineer was of the opinion that deficits could always be covered by the profits from the line to St. Hanshaugen. The Rodeløkka Line would allow the municipal tramway network to grow from 3.5 to 8 kilometers (2.2 to 5.0 mi).

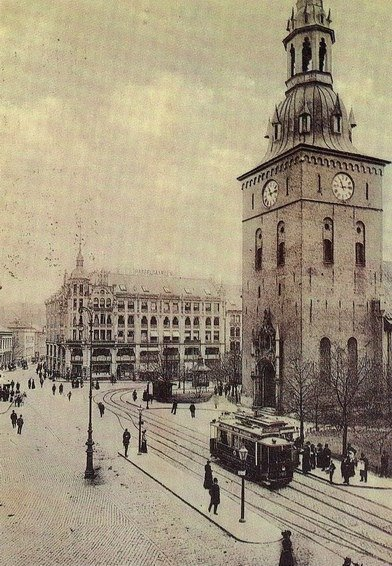
KKS tram passing by Oslo Cathedral at Stortorvet

=== Operating history ===
Construction of the Sagene Line commenced in early 1899. The final line, from Storgaten to Festningsbryggen, was approved by the city council in May 1899, at a cost of NOK 200,000. At about that time the construction of the Rodeløkka Line started. The Sagene Line line was somewhat delayed and operations started on 24 November. It initially received a ten-minute headway because the power company was not able to supply sufficient power to run additional trams. This was later increased to five minutes. The company had not had capacity to straight out all aspects of operations, including that of procuring uniforms. The lack of such attire was criticized by the press. At first the service ran from Sagene to Athenæum, with additional services from St. Hanshaugen to Athenæum.

The Rodeløkka Line was completed by January 1900. However, there was not sufficient electricity available to power the tramway. Operations did not commence until March, when the power use for lighting was reduced. It also initially received a ten-minute headway, limited by the amount of available power. The route ran from Rodeløkka to Nybrua, when it connected to KSS's Grünerløkka–Torshov Line and ran to the latter's main downtown terminal of Egertorget. From June an agreement was reached with KES, allow the Sagene services to run along their Skøyen Line from Athenæum to Jernbanetorget, serving Oslo East Station.

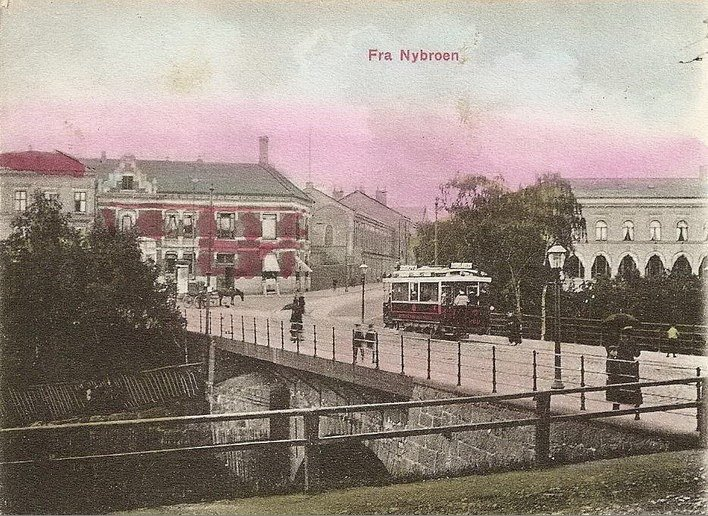
KKS tram crossing Nybrua on the Rodeløkka Line

At the annual meeting in April 1900 the company was criticized for having less comfortable trams than the competitors, and that the announced progress in construction to Fæstningebryggen on Vippetangen had not been carried through. The same month construction commenced on the Vippetangen Line and it was inaugurated in August. With the opening of the line, the extra trains on from St. Hanshaugen were extended to Fæstningebryggen.

In 1900 KKS presented plans for an expansion of the Sagene Line through Arendalsgaten, Bentse Bridge, Hegermannsgate and Vogts gate to Grefsen Station (then known as Sandaker Station). This was found by the municipal council to be too extensive and the instead supported that the line be built as an extension of the Grünerløkka–Torshov Line. Operation were slightly shifted in 1901. Work trams were introduced in the morning before 07 hours, whereby anyone could travel for 5 øre. At first the trams would stop at any location that passengers signaled. From 1901 the company introduced regular stations for boarding and disembarkment.

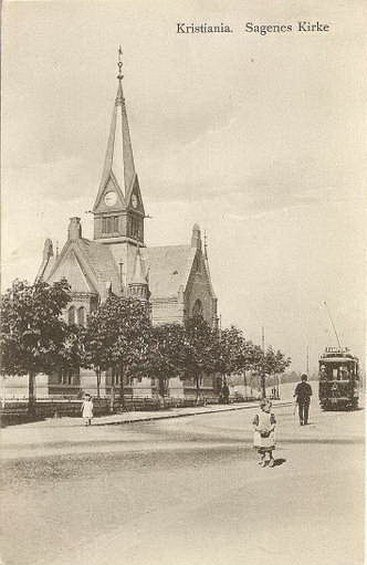
Tram at the terminus at Sagene Church

From early 1901 KSS terminated its track sharing agreement, hindering the trams from running to Jernbanetorget. The Vippetangen Line was extended northwards to Kirkeristen on the Grünerløkka–Torshov Line. In 1902 the tracks were rearranged so they could run through Stortorvet. This resulted in two services: from Sagene via Egertorget and Stortorvet to Rodeløkka, and from St. Hanshaugen via Egertorget and Stortorvet to Fæstningebryggen. KKS lost NOK 150,000 through its operating history. In 1904, its final full financial year, it had a revenue of NOK 306,000.

=== Privatization ===
KSS was in a situation that they concession would expire in 1905. The issued an application for a new two years in advance and offered to take over KKS in the process. This raised a new debate concerning public or private operations, with many Conservative politicians calling for the privatization of KKS. In the 1904 municipal election the issue was raised, with the Liberal Party and the socialist parties running for municipalization of tram operations. Meanwhile, the municipal administration worked with estimates for taking over KSS. A take-over would cost the municipality about NOK 2 million, while a sale would bring in about NOK 1.6 million. However, as KSS was a profitable company, it was estimated that the municipality would make more money by taking over KSS than selling KKS, estimated at NOK 3 million for the period in question.

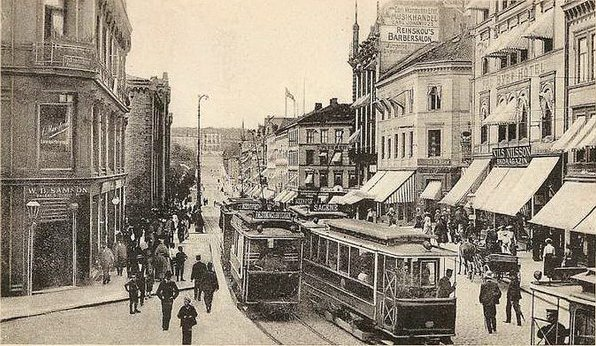
Two trams at Egertorget

The decisive municipal council meeting was held on 14 April 1905, although the actual vote did not occur to 02 hours the following day, after a nine-hour debate. Among the issues raised was the impartiality of those councilor who owned shares in or were employed by KSS. The Ministry of Justice found neither a KSS conductor nor a councilor who owned shares in the private company as impartial. Arguments presented for privatization was the lack of profits in KKS, that the municipality would increase the number of employees, that the sale would reduce the municipal debt and that KSS had offered favorable conditions. Arguments presented for munisipalization was this would be profitable for the municipality, as it would be taking over a profitable company, that the shortfall in revenue was because of a temporary bust in the economy and that the majority of KSS was owned by foreign, German company.

A compromise was proposed whereby KSS would receive a concession until 1909, but this was downcast with 47 against 37 votes. The council then approved the sale and extension of the concession with 48 against 36 votes. Because of the lack of a qualified majority, the county governor demanded a new vote. This was carried out on 23 May and received the same voting. The same day the board of KSS approved the purchase of KKS. They financed the purchase through a combination of loans and issuing new shares. The official date of the transaction was 6 October 1905.

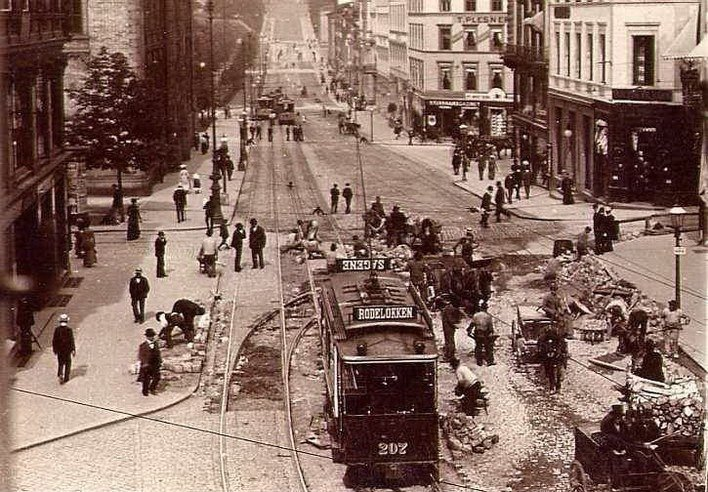
Tram passing through Egertorget

The agreed upon conditions for the sale involved that KSS bought KKS for its listed value, in addition to the NOK 150,000 loss the company had incurred during production. In addition it would compensate with four percent dividend per year on the share capital. KKS employees retained their jobs, wage levels and seniority. KSS received a twenty-year extension of its concession under certain conditions. It would pay eight percent of future revenue to the municipality, and a minimum NOK 100,000 per year. The tram company simultaneously agreed to buy its electricity from Oslo Lysverker for 9 øre per kilowatt hour. Prices were regulated by the concession and the municipality received the right to appoint one board member. The take-over included 6 kilometers (3.7 mi) of tramway, two depots and all 32 units of rolling stock.

=== Legacy ===
Both KSS and KES were taken over by the municipality in 1924, when their concessions expired. Oslo Municipality thereby established a new municipally owned company, Oslo Sporveier, to operate all street trams in Oslo. KSS continued to use the Class S trams until 1918. However, many of the trams were rebuilt to other models and these remained in service until 1966. KSS had no need for Rodeløkka Depot and closed it down immediately after the take-over. The Rodeløkka Line was closed in 1949, although the southern part is still in operation as part of the Sinsen Line. Sagene Ring closed in 1961, and the Vippetangen Line followed suit six years later.

== Network ==
A map of the tram network in 1939 which indicates lines built by KKS

The tramway company owned three physical lines of the Oslo Tramway's street network: the Rodeløkka Line, the Sagene Ring and the Vippetangen Line. These did not intersect and were therefore connected via lines of KSS. The network had a total length of 6 kilometers (3.7 mi). Sagene Depot was the company's main depot. It also operated the smaller Rodeløkka Depot. KKS received its power from the municipal Oslo Lysverker.

Sagene Ring started downtown at Athenæum in Akersgata, near the Parliament of Norway Building, where there was a track connection with KES's Skøyen Line. It ran north, intersecting with KKS's line in Karl Johans gate. It continued along Colletts gate, Geitemyrsveien and Kierschouws gate through the neighborhoods of St. Hanshaugen and Sagene. It terminated at Sagene Depot, close to Sagene Church. Sagene Ring had a length of 3.5 kilometers (2.2 mi) in 1905, of which about half was double track.

The Rodeløkka Line branched from KSS's Grünerløkka–Torshov Line at Nybrua and ran along Trondheimsveien to Helgesens gata. There it branched off and continued along Rathkes gate, Verksgata and Københavngata until it reached its terminus at the intersection with Dælenenggata. The line was 1.6 kilometers (0.99 mi) long, of which about half was double track.

The Vippetangen Line ran from the Grünerløkka–Torshov Line at Kirkeristen and ran south along Dronningens gate. It intersected with the Skøyen Line at Tollbugata. From there it continued along Dronningens gate until it crossed Grev Wedels gate and terminated at Fæstningebryggen. The line was 1 kilometer (0.6 mi) long, most of which was double track.

== Rolling stock ==
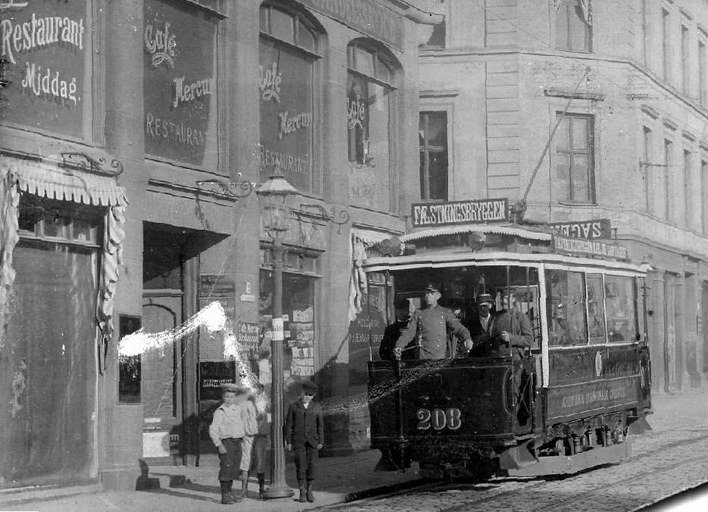
KKS Class S tram no. 208 in Karl Johans gate

KKS employed a fleet of 20 trams and 12 trailers. These had an identical 7.8-meter (26 ft) long and 2.0-meter (6 ft 7 in) body with wooden exterior paneling. KKS ordered the trams from Schukert, who built the electrical and technical equipment, while the bodies were built by Busch. They features outdoor bays for the motorman and a cabin with wooden benches in the longitudinal direction. All units had seating for twenty passengers. The motorized vehicles had seating for fourteen, while the trailer had seating for twenty.

The vehicles were twin-axled. The motorized versions were equipped with two AB71 motors, each providing 25.5 kilowatts (34.2 hp) for a total 51 kilowatts (68 hp) power output. The motor cars weighed 9.3 tonnes (9.2 long tons; 10.3 short tons), while the trailers weighed 6.4 tonnes (6.3 long tons; 7.1 short tons). They were equipped with only primary suspension, causing them to vibrate more than other trams in traffic at the time. While in service with KKS the motorized trams were numbered 201–220 and the trailers 250–261.

KKS painted its trams red and they prominently featured the seal of Oslo. To distinguish KKS's trams from the other operators, a journalist started calling KKS the "Red Trams", to distinguish it from the green and blue trams of KSS and KES, respectively, and the name stuck.

== Bibliography ==
- Aspenberg, Nils Carl (1994). Trikker og forstadsbaner i Oslo (in Norwegian). Oslo: Baneforlaget. ISBN 82-91448-03-5.
- Fasting, Kåre (1975). Sporveier i Oslo gjennom 100 år: 1875–1975 (in Norwegian). Oslo: Grøhdal & Søn. ISBN 82-504-0116-6.
- Fristad, Hans Andreas (1990). Oslo-trikken – storbysjel på skinner (in Norwegian). Oslo: Gyldendal. ISBN 82-05-19084-4.
- Hartmann, Eivind; Mangset, Øistein (2001). Neste stopp!: Verneplan for bygninger (in Norwegian). Oslo: Baneforlaget. p. 68. ISBN 82-91448-17-5.
