= Viggo Johannessen =

Norwegian director and civil servant

Viggo Johannessen (6 February 1936 – 21 June 2012) was a Norwegian director and civil servant.

He was born at Nøtterøy Municipality in 1936. In 1963, he graduated from the University of Oslo with a cand.real. degree. From 1960 to 72, Johannessen worked as a scientist at the Institute of Transport Economics; for the rest of the decade he acted as managing director of Linjegods. In 1982, after ten years at Linjegods, he became the managing director of the three Oslo local transport authorities Oslo Sporveier, Ekebergbanen and Holmenkolbanen. In 1985, Johannessen left the director's office in order to become chief administrative officer of finance (finansrådmann) of Oslo Municipality. In 1991, he returned to Oslo Sporveier as special adviser, and, in the following year became division director of the same company. He died in 2012.
