= Rodeløkka Depot =

Tram depot in Oslo, Norway

Location
- Location: Rodeløkka, Oslo, Norway

Characteristics
- Operator: Kristiania Sporveisselskab

History
- Opened: 1899
- Closed: 1905

Rodeløkka Depot was a tram depot located in Verksgaten at Rodeløkka in Oslo, Norway.

== History ==
The depot was built for Kristiania Kommunale Sporveie in 1899. It was taken out of use when Kristiania Sporveisselskab took over the operation of the Rodeløkka Line in 1905. The tin shed was disassembled in the 1930s, and is now used as boat storing house at the summer resort place of Oslotrikken's employees at Herøya in Tyrifjorden. It is one of the oldest tram depots in Oslo that are preserved.

== Facilities ==
The depot was a small red tin shed with place for six cars, built on municipally owned ground.
