= Carl Berners plass =

Square in Oslo, Norway

Coordinates: 59°55′34″N 10°46′33″E

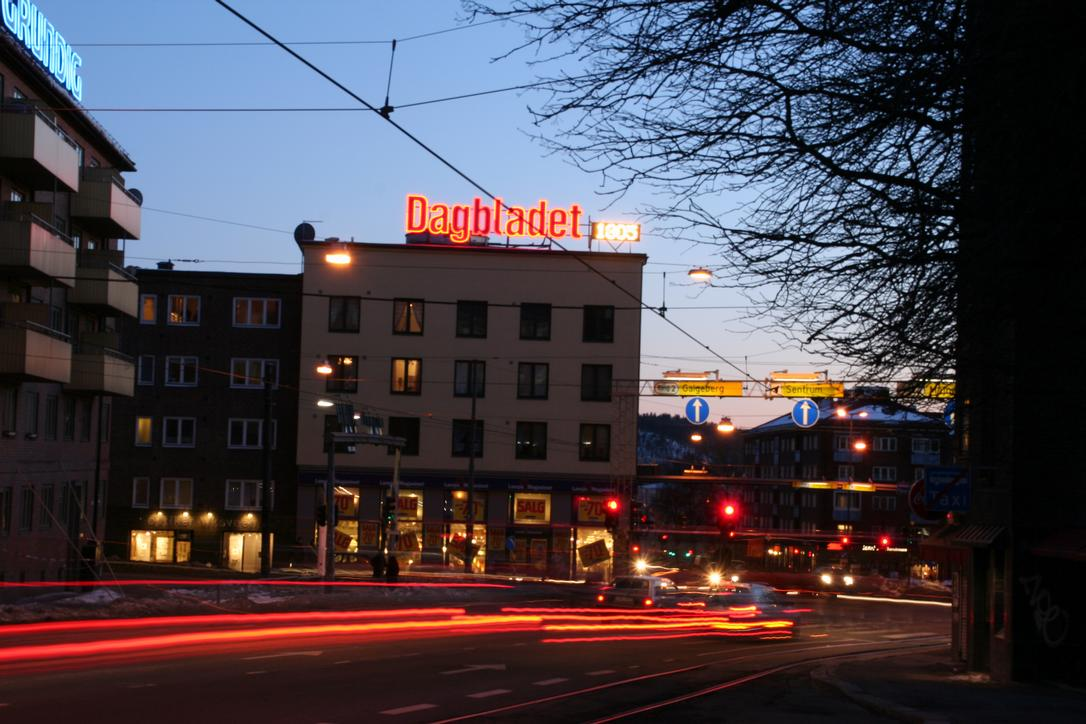

Carl Berners plass is a square in Oslo, Norway. It is located in the borough Helsfyr, south of Sinsen. The Sinsen Line of the Oslo Tramway runs over the square. The colloquial expression for the square is just "Carl Berner". Around the square is a large number of shops as well as inexpensive restaurants. At the southern end of the area is the large Tøyen Park.

== The name ==
The square is colloquially known simply as 'Carl Berner'. It is named after Carl Christian Berner (1841–1918), a Norwegian politician for the Liberal Party. He was member of the Council of State Division in Stockholm 1891–92, and Norwegian Minister of Education and Church Affairs 1891–93.

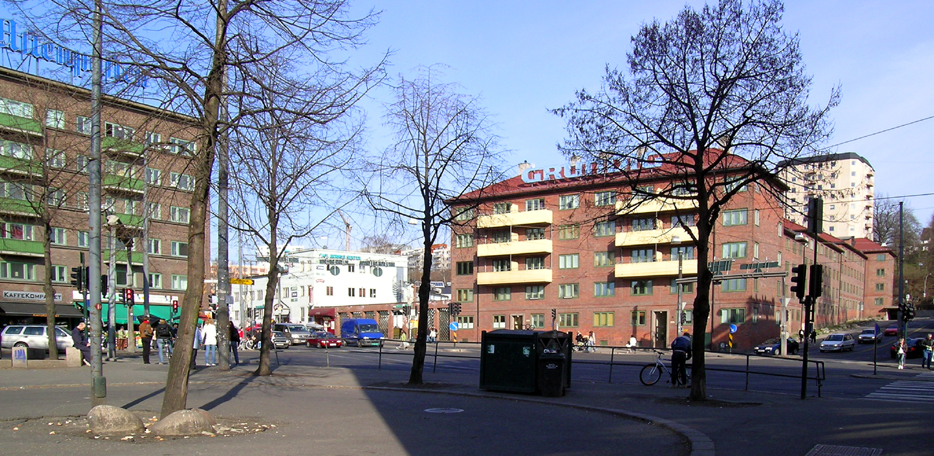
The square

== Transportation ==
Carl Berners plass is an underground rapid transit station located on the Grorud Line of the Oslo Metro, and a tram stop on the Sinsen Line of the Oslo Tramway. The square also has a bus stop for lines 20, 21, 28, 31, 380 and 390 (Soon also line 26).

== Infrastructure improvements ==
In September 2007, a project for improving the square's visuals and traffic-related capabilities was passed. The project started April 2008, and finished by autumn 2010. The square is served by the station with the same name. The square used to be controlled by traffic lights but is now rebuilt in to a roundabout, a circle that encircles a central square island.

== In the literature ==
Both the square and the subway station figure prominently and significantly in Per Petterson's novel I curse the River of Time (2010).

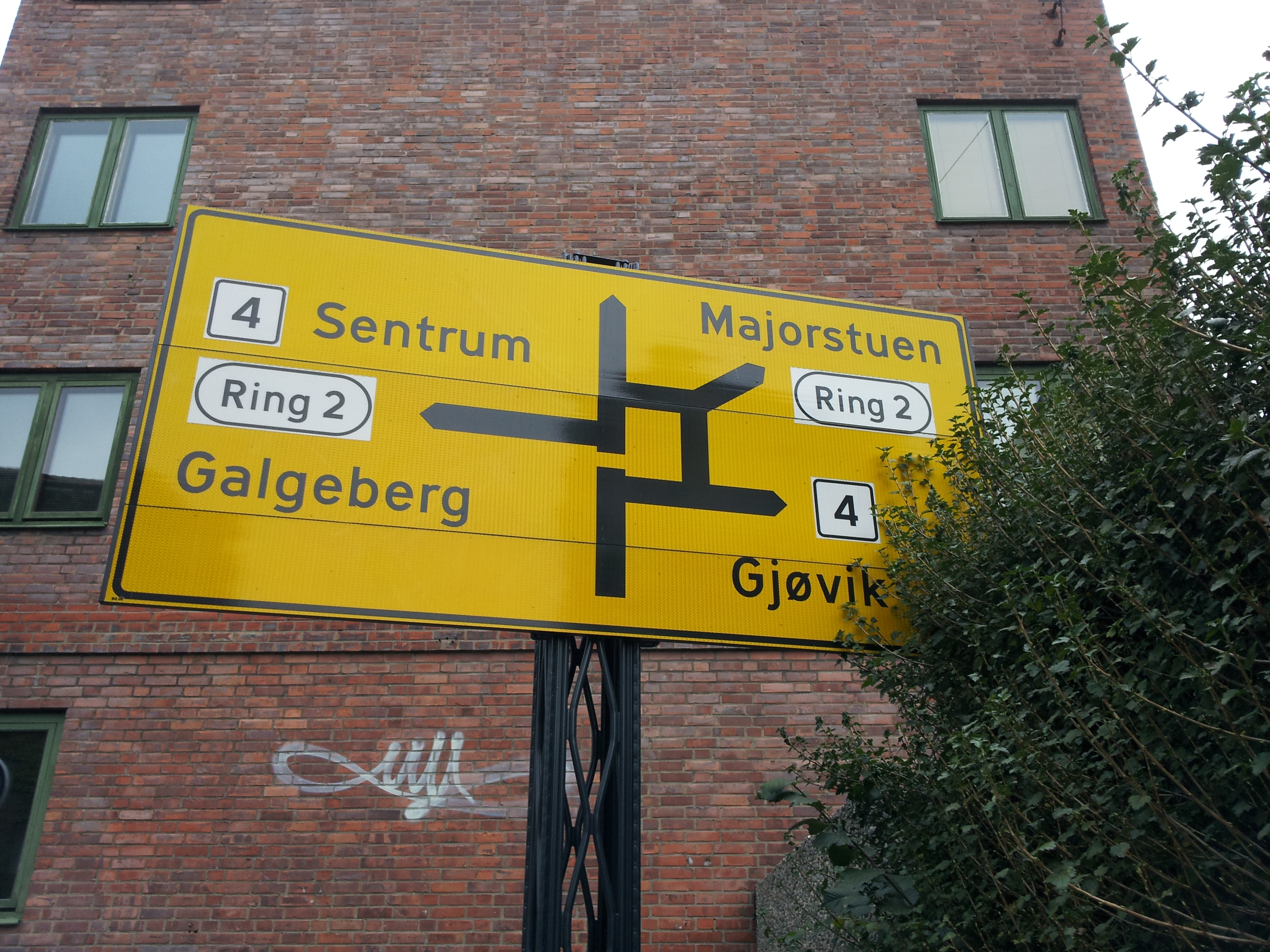
Sign of Carl Berners plass, standing in Border Road 100 meters east of the junction
