= HkB 600 =

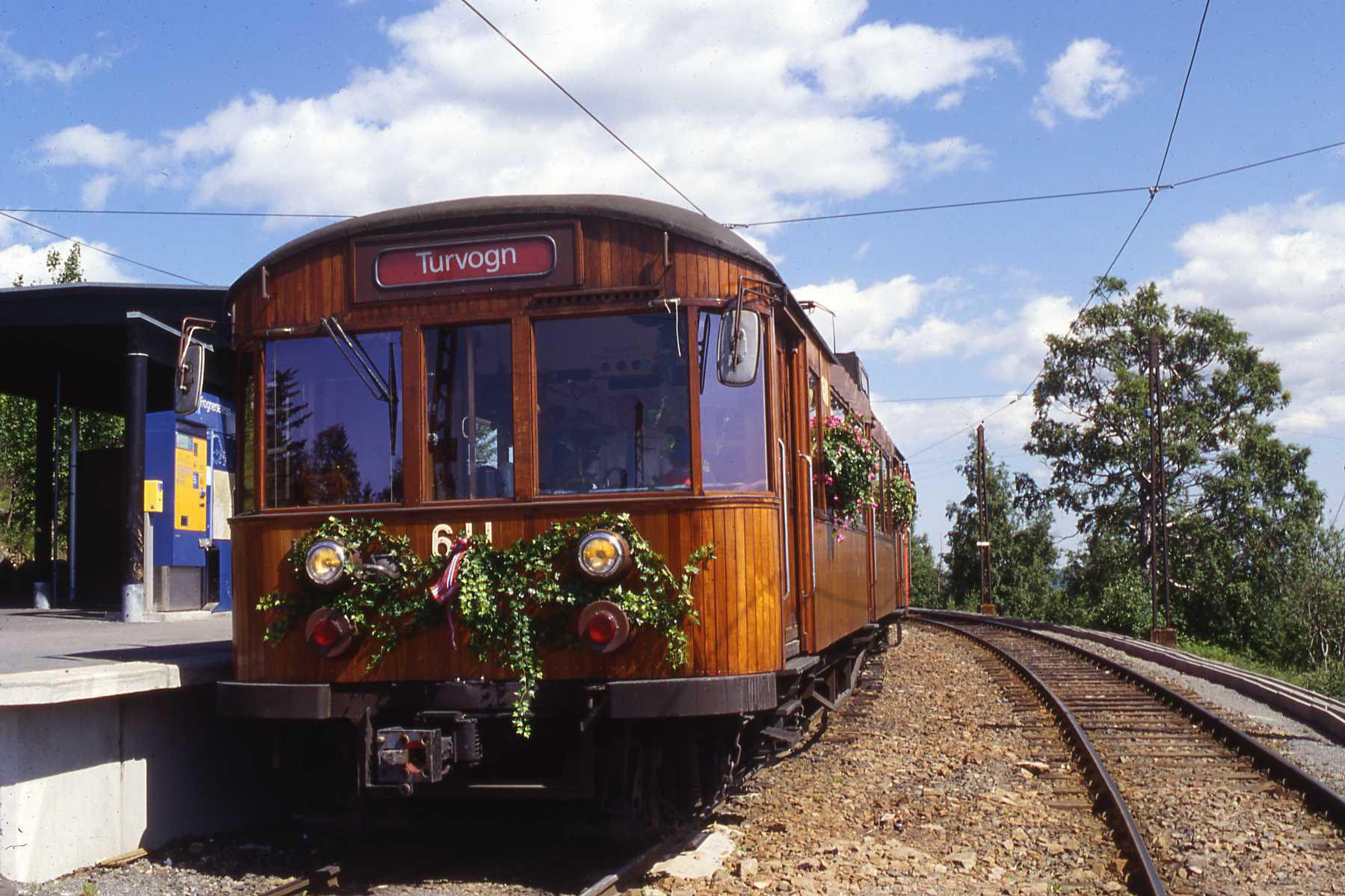
Last trip with the HkB 600 in 1995

HkB 600 were electric teak wagons formerly used on the Oslo Metro of Oslo, Norway. 12 double-car multiple units were built by Skabo Jernbanevognfabrikk and AEG from 1951 to 1956. Each train was 14.45 metres (47.4 ft) long, and could carry 40 standing and 120 seated passengers. Maximum speed was 60 kilometres per hour (37 mph). The wagons were taken out of use in 1995, and replaced with OS T2000 wagons.
