= Sinsen Interchange =

Multilevel road junction

Coordinates: 59°56′15″N 10°47′5″E

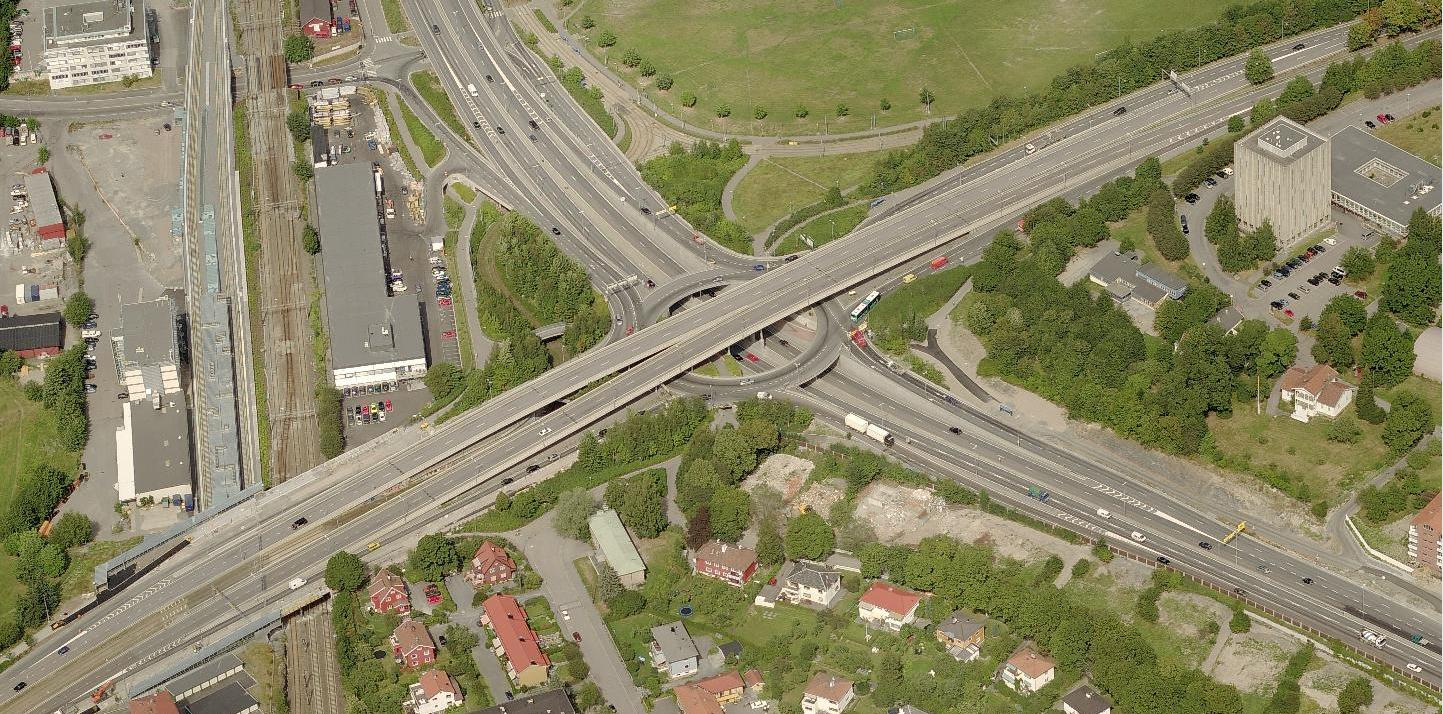
The Sinsen Interchange

The Sinsen Interchange (Norwegian: Sinsenkrysset) is a heavily trafficked, multilevel road junction in Oslo, Norway. It connects the highways Norwegian National Road 150 and Norwegian National Road 4 (Trondheimsveien). The junction has existed since the 19th century, and has grown considerably in size since then. It was enhanced with a roundabout in 1957, and was connected with National road 150 in 1962. The increase in traffic was greater than the capacity of the junction, and thus a bridge was constructed that redirected Trondheimsveien above the roundabout. Further restructuring was done in 1992, when a local tramway line was redirected outside of the interchange, and in 1994, when Riksvei 150 was directed below the roundabout. The Norwegian Public Roads Administration plans to connect the Løren Tunnel, a planned tunnel over National road 150, with the Sinsen interchange in late 2008.

"North of the Sinsen Interchange" is common expression in the Norwegian district debates, where inhabitants of Oslo are accused of being ignorant of the country north of the interchange. The expression cropped up in revues during the 1960s, and is probably due to that Sinsen then was the end point for the main road leading into Oslo from the north.
