= Oslo Metro rolling stock =

Rolling stock used in Oslo Metro

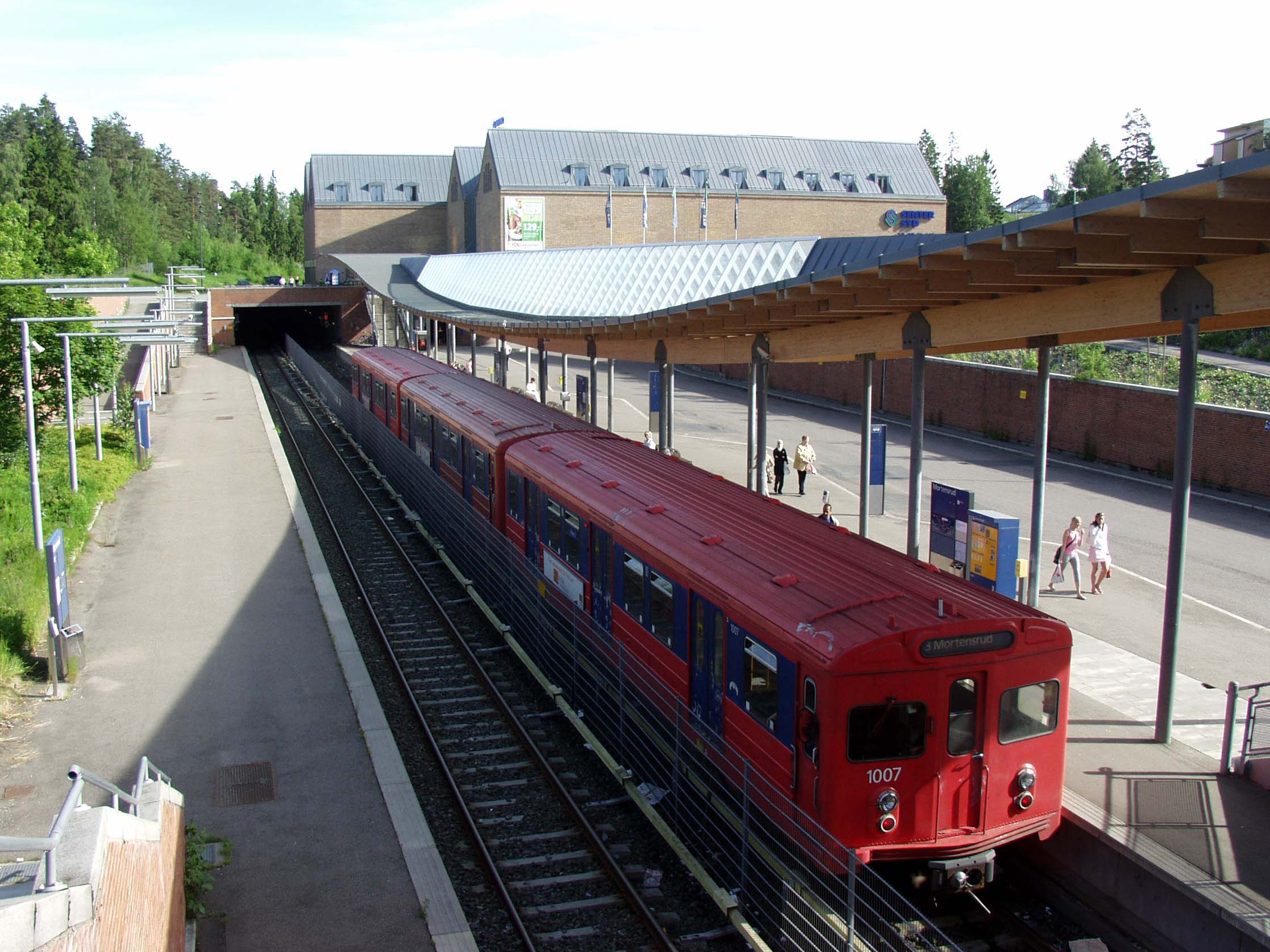
T1000 unit at Mortensrud

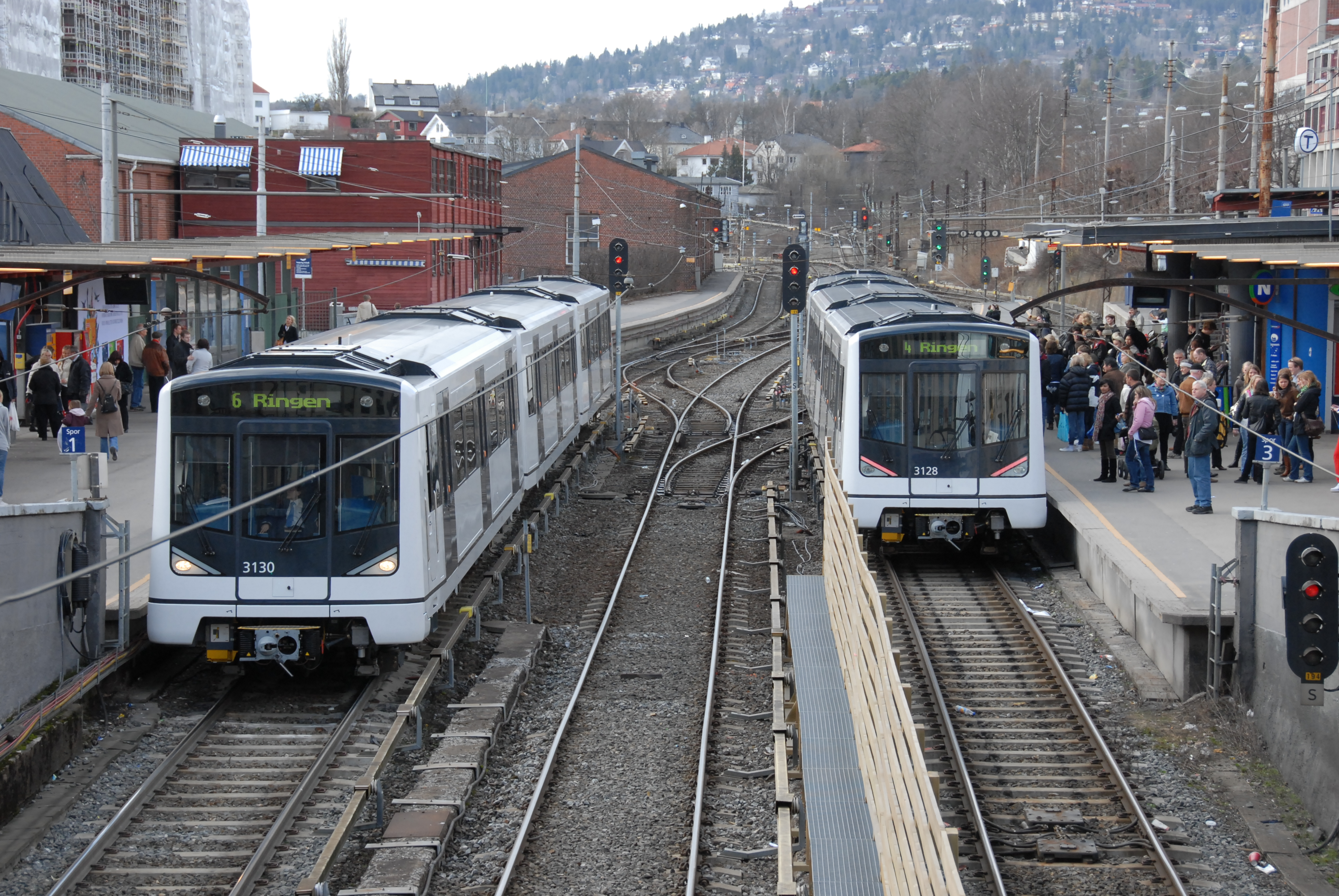
Two MX3000 units at Majorstuen

The rolling stock of Oslo Metro, Norway, has consisted of three classes: T1000/T1300, T2000 and MX3000. The T1000 was built as 162 single cars from 1964 to 1978. From 1979 to 1985, 33 new T1300 trains were built, followed by the conversion of 16 T1000s. Six two-car T2000 units were delivered in 1994. Since 2005, the first 83 three-car MX3000 units have been replacing the older stock, and the last T1000 was retired in 2007. From 2010, only MX3000-trains are in use. The T1000/T1300 and T2000 were built by Strømmens Værksted, with motors from Norsk Elektrisk & Brown Boveri (NEBB) and AEG, respectively, and the MX3000 were built by Siemens.

All trains receive 750 V DC from a third rail shoe, while the T1300 and T2000 also have pantographs. This allows the latter to also operate on the suburban lines of the Oslo Tramway, which the western part of the current metro was part of until 1995. All trains feature automatic train protection and step-free access from the platforms. Trains can operate up to six cars in length. The T1000/T1300 and MX3000 are capable of 70 kilometres per hour (43 mph), while the T2000 can operate at 100 kilometres per hour (62 mph). The T2000 introduced articulated cars, while the MX3000 introduced regenerative brakes and air conditioning. The T1000/T1300 and MX3000 can be run in multiple with each other, but not with the T2000. The MX3000 replaced the red color scheme with a white livery.

== History ==
In 1954, the Oslo City Council decided to build a four-line metro to the new suburbs to the east of the city center. The plans called for the system to open in 1966, with the conversion of the Østensjø Line and the Lambertseter Line of the Oslo Tramway, and the new Furuset Line and Grorud Line. The system would feature higher and longer platforms, allowing step-free access to six-car trains, automatic train protection and third-rail power supply. This would make the metro incompatible with the existing tramways in Oslo. The first units in the T1000 series were two single-car prototypes designated T. They were test-run on the existing tramways from 1959 to 1960, and were then put into service on the Kolsås Line. Prone to technical faults, they were taken out of regular service in 1982.

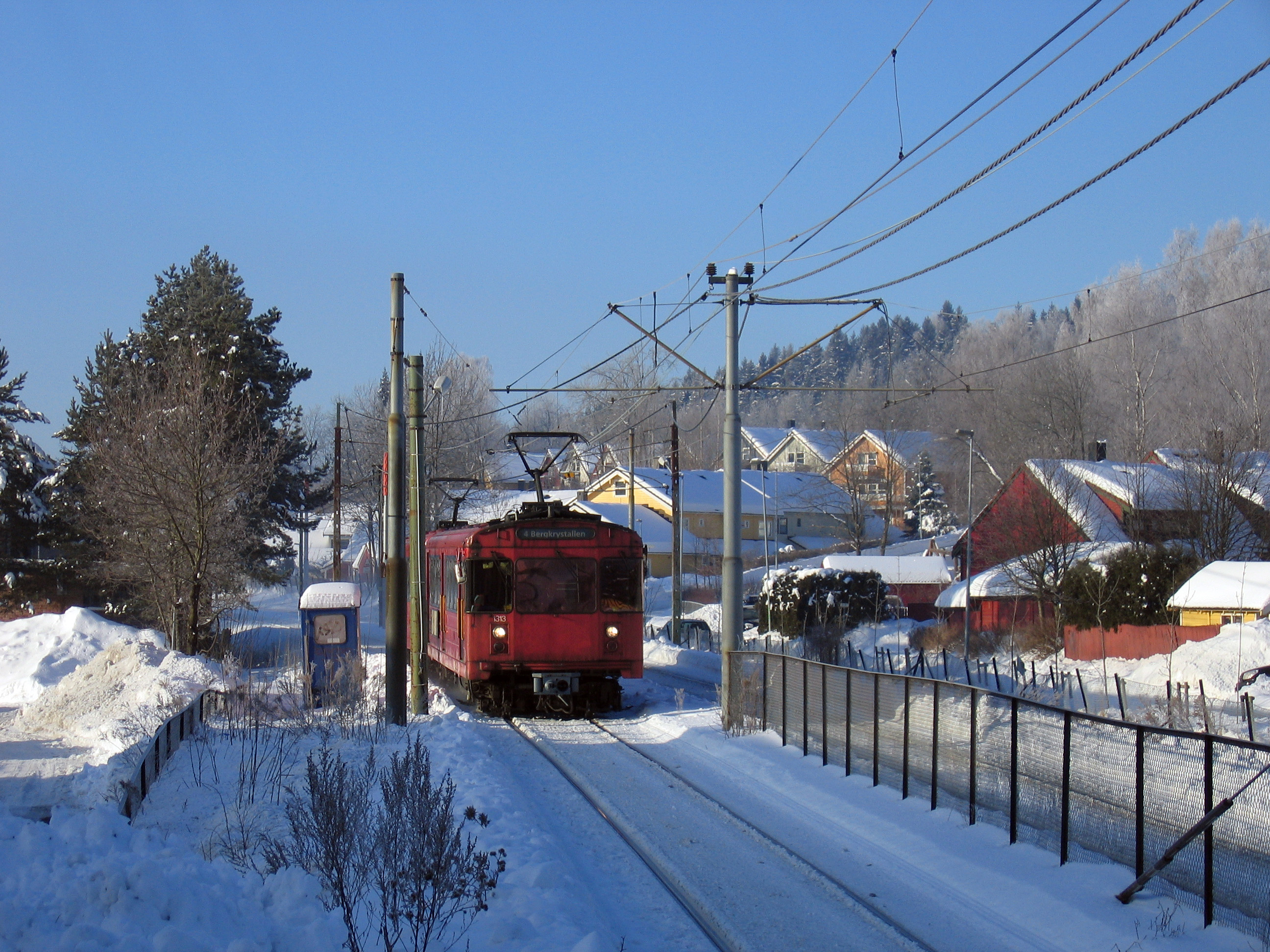
T1300 unit near Valler

Serial production of the T1000 started in 1964 by Strømmens Værksted, NEBB and AEG. Until 1978, 162 cars were delivered to Oslo Sporveier. These were manufactured in four series, designated T1 through T4, with minor changes to specifications. During the late 1970s, the western suburban lines which were part of the tramway needed new rolling stock. Oslo Sporveier was at the time considering connecting the metro with these lines, and between 1978 and 1981, 33 new T1300 cars were built. The only difference from the T1000 was that they had a pantograph that allowed them to operate on the tramways. They also retained the necessary technical appliances to run on the metro. The new T1300 were designated T5 and T6. From 1985 to 1989, 16 T4s were rebuilt to T1300 and designated T7 and T8.

Oslo Sporveier was highly satisfied with the SL79 articulated trams that had been delivered during the 1980s. In 1985, work started on the development of a modified version for the western suburban lines. The stock on the Holmenkollen and Kolsås Lines were the first that needed to be replaced. At the same time, the company wanted to make the trains compatible with the metro so they could operate on both systems. The new stock was considered to be a trial; if it met performance expectations, future orders could be made to replace the T1000 stock, after the latter reached the end of its economical life in about 2000. The required specification for the new train was published in October 1988.

In the late 1980s, it was decided to upgrade the Røa and Sognsvann Lines to metro standard. This would allow them to use T1000 stock. Twelve T2000 were ordered in 1991, and would be sufficient to operate the services on the Holmenkollen and Kolsås Lines, that would retain an overhead wire. The development costs for the T2000 were in part subsidized by the government, as the high-tech product from Strømmens Verksted (by then part of ABB) and AEG was seen as a future export product. The trains were delivered in 1994 and taken into use in 1995. The same year, the metro started operating all services through the city center, connecting the western and eastern networks.

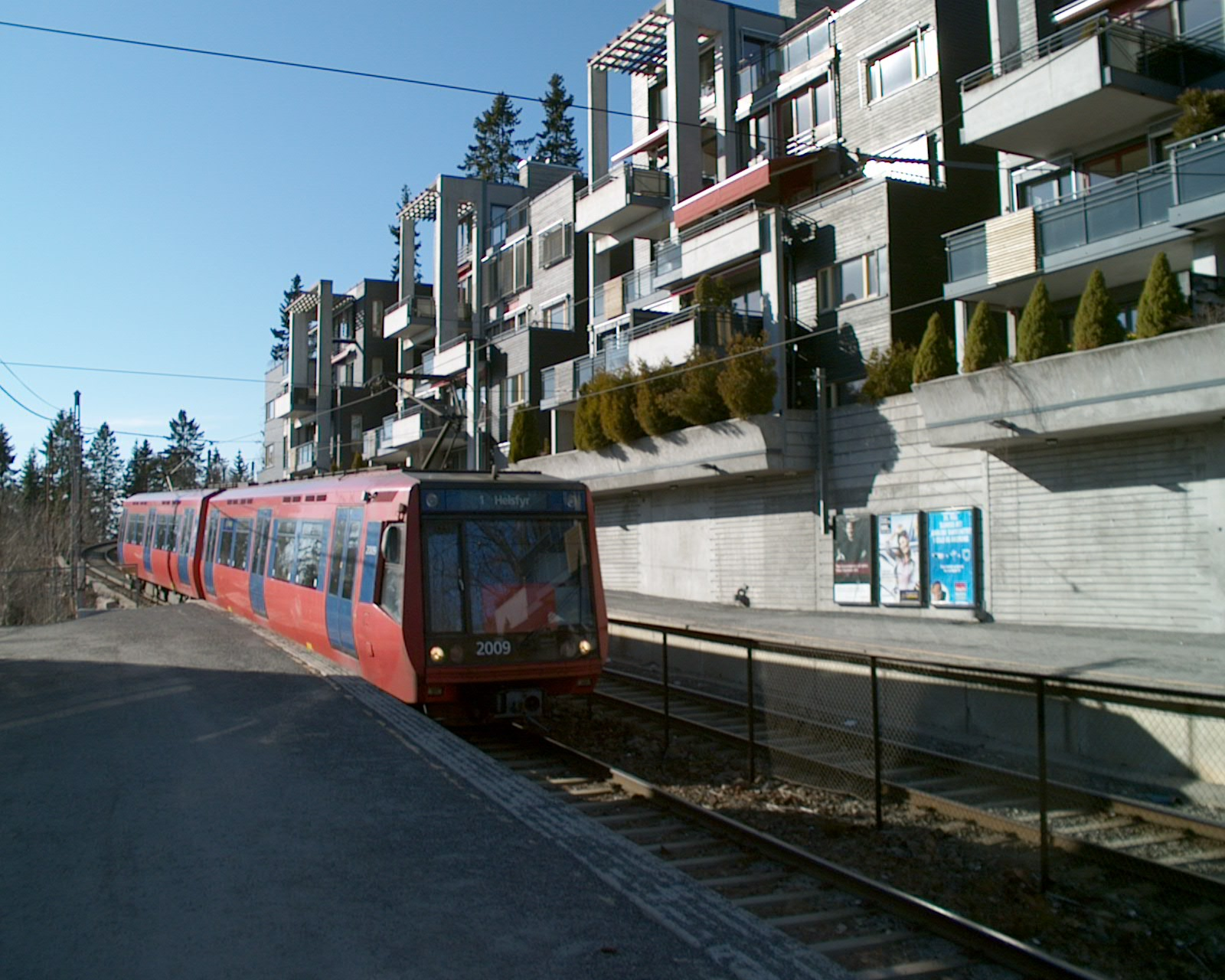
T2000 unit at Holmenkollen

In 1996, the work to establish a financing package for new investments in public transport in Akershus and Oslo started. Oslo Package 2 was passed in 2001 and allowed municipal and state grants to be supplemented by increased fare and toll road revenue to finance, among other things, new trains for the metro. The initial order by Oslo Sporveier in 2003 from Siemens was for 33 units (99 cars), plus options for further orders. In 2005, the city council voted to replace all existing T1000 and T1300 stock with the MX3000, increasing the quantity by another 30 units. Two test units were delivered in October 2005, with the first serial deliveries in April 2007. With the delivery of the new white and gray trains, Oslo Sporveier received criticism that they had been disloyal to the old red color of the metro, and that they did not follow up on their former design concept from the 1960s through the 1980s. Following the 2006 decision to convert the Kolsås Line to metro standard, Akershus County Municipality announced they would order five units.

In November 2006, the city government proposed that the maintenance of the new trains be privatized. This resulted in protests from the employees, who campaigned by refusing to work overtime. As a result, after a few weeks, the company lacked 57 trains to provide adequate service. The issue was solved when the socialist opposition parties along with the Liberal Party agreed to postpone the matter until after all the new trains were delivered in 2009. As part of the agreement, a new limited company, Oslo Vognselskap, wholly owned by Kollektivtransportproduksjon, would take ownership of all metro trains and trams used by the operating companies. Responsibility for the debt accumulated for buying the trains is to be managed by Oslo Vognselskap, while operation and management of the maintenance contracts was transferred to Oslo T-banedrift.

In 2008, the city council in Oslo decided to upgrade the Holmenkollen Line to metro standard, to allow six-car MX3000 trains to be the main mode of transport to Holmenkollen Ski Jump during the FIS Nordic World Ski Championships 2011. This will allow 9,000 people per hour to be transported to the sports venue. The first T1000 was scrapped on 14 March 2007, and the last T1000 train was run on 19 July 2009. Oslo Tramway Museum has preserved six T1000 cars, no. 1002 (T1-2), 1018 (T1-2), 1076 (T1-1), 1092 (T2), 1129 (T3) and 1141 (T4). In 2008, the T2000 were taken out of service while the Holmenkollen Line was being renovated. In 2010, Ruten decided that they would not put back into service, largely because of high maintenance costs and low availability of spare parts because of the technically complex design and small series. The last T1300 was retired on 22 May 2010, after which only MX3000 units are used on the metro.

In February 2022, in order to cover the system's expanded needs for when the Fornebu Line opens, Sporveien announced they would order 20 new trains, designated as the M4000. In May 2024, CAF was awarded the contract, which includes an option of up to 90 additional units. On 16 November 2026, CAF announced that Sporveien had purchased 24 more trainsets, bringing the total number of sets ordered to 44.

== Specifications ==
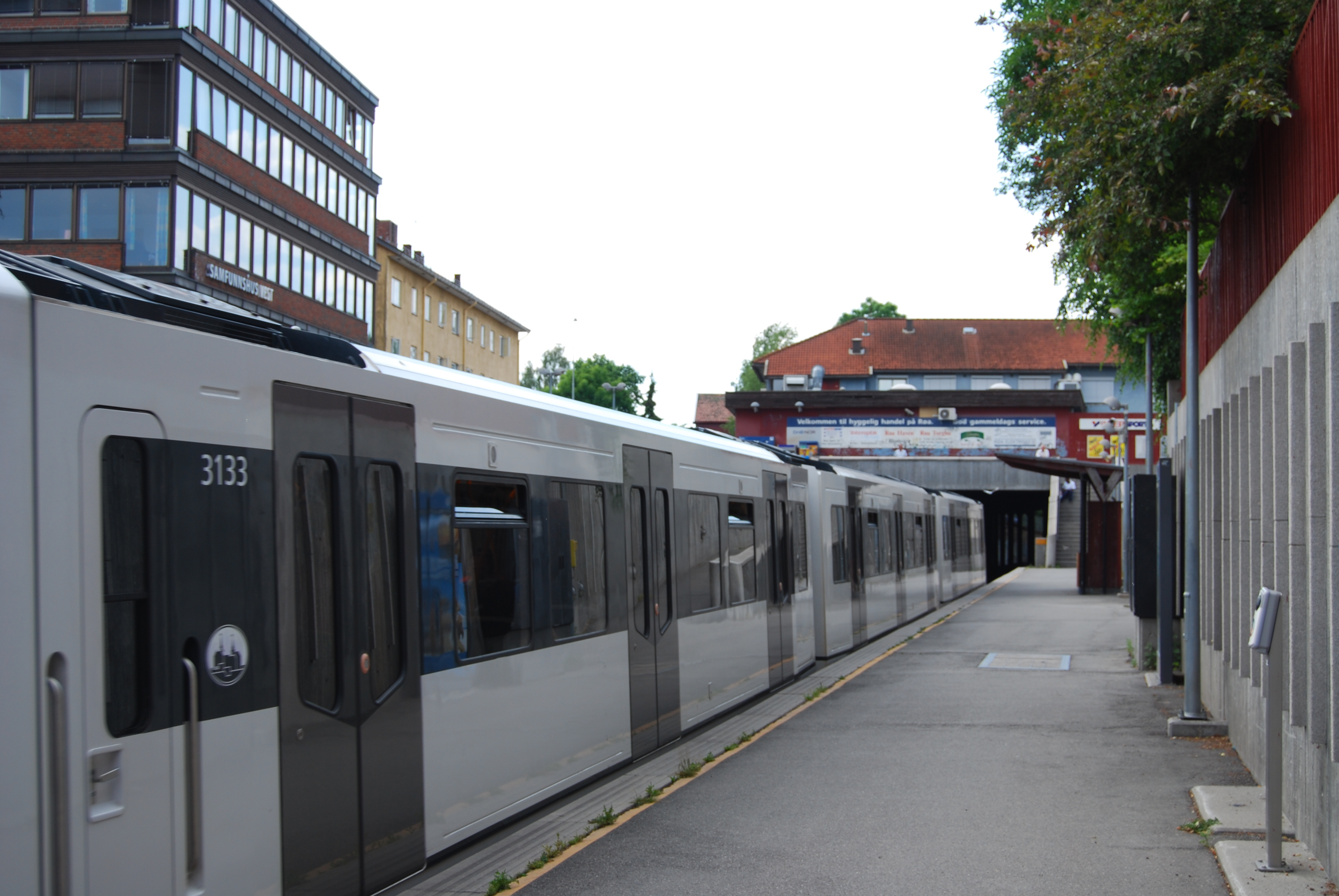
MX3000 unit at Røa

The Oslo Metro uses 750 volt direct current fed to the train via a third rail, along a standard gauge track. The system is not compatible to the Oslo Tramway, but the T1300 and T2000 have been built to run on both the suburban lines of the tramway and the metro. The platforms are 110 metres (360 ft) long, and the height of the train floors are 1.12 meters (3 ft 8 in) above the track, allowing step-free access to the platforms.

The trains' speed are controlled by an automatic train protection (ATP) system. The speed codes are transferred from the ATP points in the infrastructure, using 75 hertz pulses in the tracks. The trains pick up the signals via antennas. The speed codes are 15 km/h (9 mph), 30 km/h (19 mph), 50 km/h (31 mph) and 70 km/h (43 mph). They are communicated to the engineer via signals in the driver's cab; in addition, the system will automatically reduce the speed, should the limit be exceeded. The driver can put the trains in an automatic mode, where the train itself adjusts its speed to the limit. The driver is always responsible for starting and halting the train at stations.

=== T1000 ===
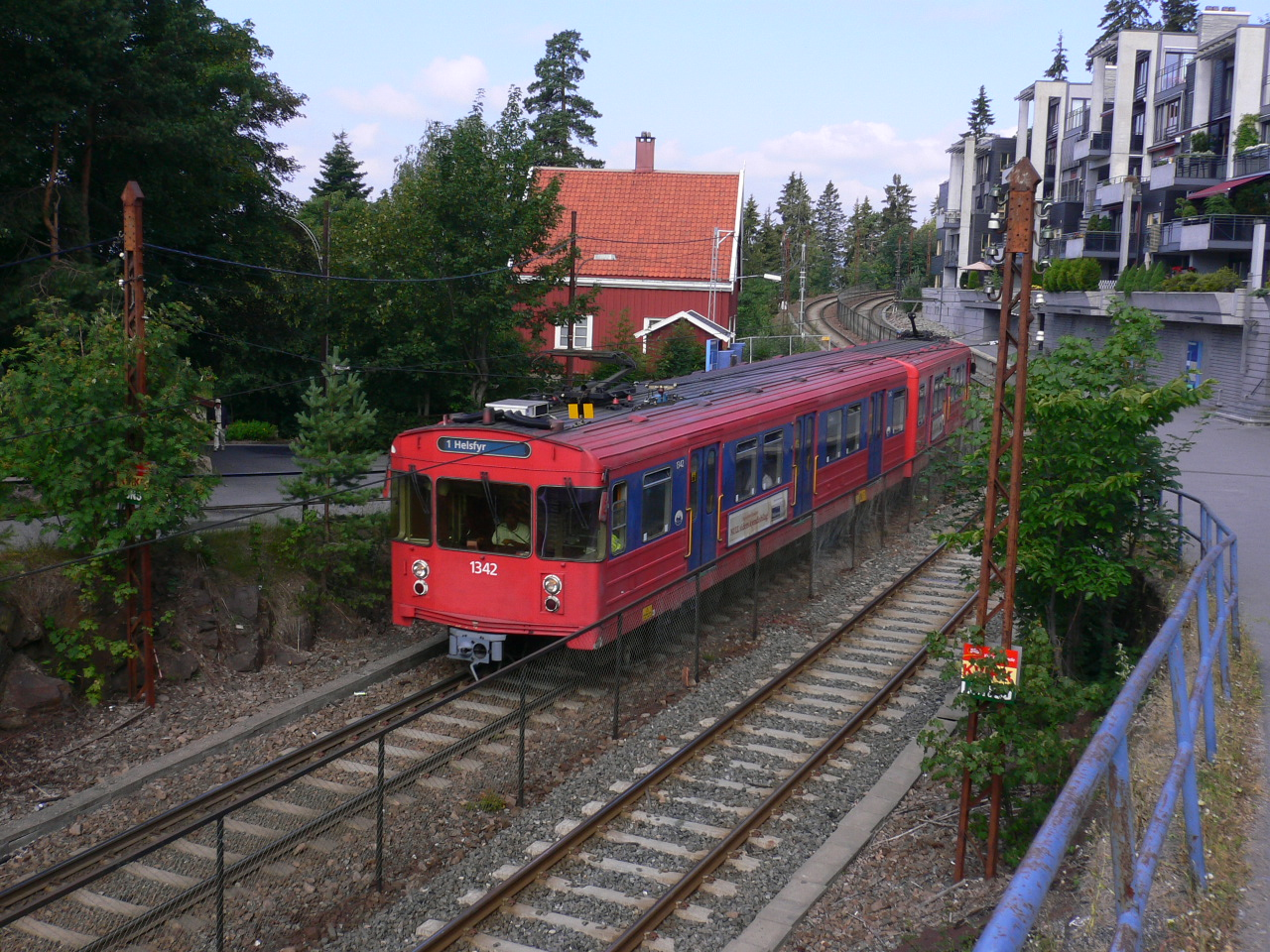
T1300 unit at Holmenkollen

The T1000 were built by Strømmens Værksted and is 17,000 millimetres (55 ft 9 in) long, 3,200 millimetres (10 ft 6 in) wide and 3,650 millimetres (12 ft 0 in) high. Each car is equipped with two bogies. The axle distance is 2,170 millimetres (7 ft 1 in), the bogie distance is 11,000 millimetres (36 ft 1 in) and the wheel diameter is 820 millimetres (2 ft 8 in). The cars are equipped with four 98-kilowatt (131 hp) motors each from NEBB, giving a maximum speed of 70 kilometres per hour (43 mph). The weight is 27.740 tonnes (27.302 long tons; 30.578 short tons) and the electrical equipment was delivered by AEG. The T1300 differ in that they have a pantograph and were built for conductors. The seating also varies: T1000 has a total capacity of 180 passengers, of which 63 can sit. T5 has the same total capacity, but 70 people can sit. T6 has a capacity for 154 people, of which 64 can be seated. T7 and T8 have a capacity for 177 passengers, of which 60 can be seated. All models are capable of operating six cars in multiple, although they are commonly used in shorter configurations.

=== T2000 ===
The T2000 was built by Strømmens Værksted and AEG as twin-car units. Each car's aluminum body is 18,000 millimetres (59 ft 1 in) long, 3,650 millimetres (12 ft 0 in) high and 3,300 millimetres (10 ft 10 in) wide. The empty weight of a car is 31 tonnes (31 long tons; 34 short tons). Capacity is for 60 seated and 125 standing passengers. There is a driver's cabin at one end of each car. Passengers sit in two compartments; the forward has conventional 2+2 seating, while the back section has 1+2+1 seating with two aisles. Both cars have power on all axles, giving a Bo'Bo' wheel arrangement. Four motors, each with 143 kilowatts (192 hp), power the car, giving a top speed of 100 km/h (62 mph) and an acceleration of 1.3 m/s^{2} (4.3 ft/s^{2}). The trains are equipped with both pantograph and third-rail shoe. The trains cannot be connected for multiple running with the T1000 trains.

=== MX3000 ===
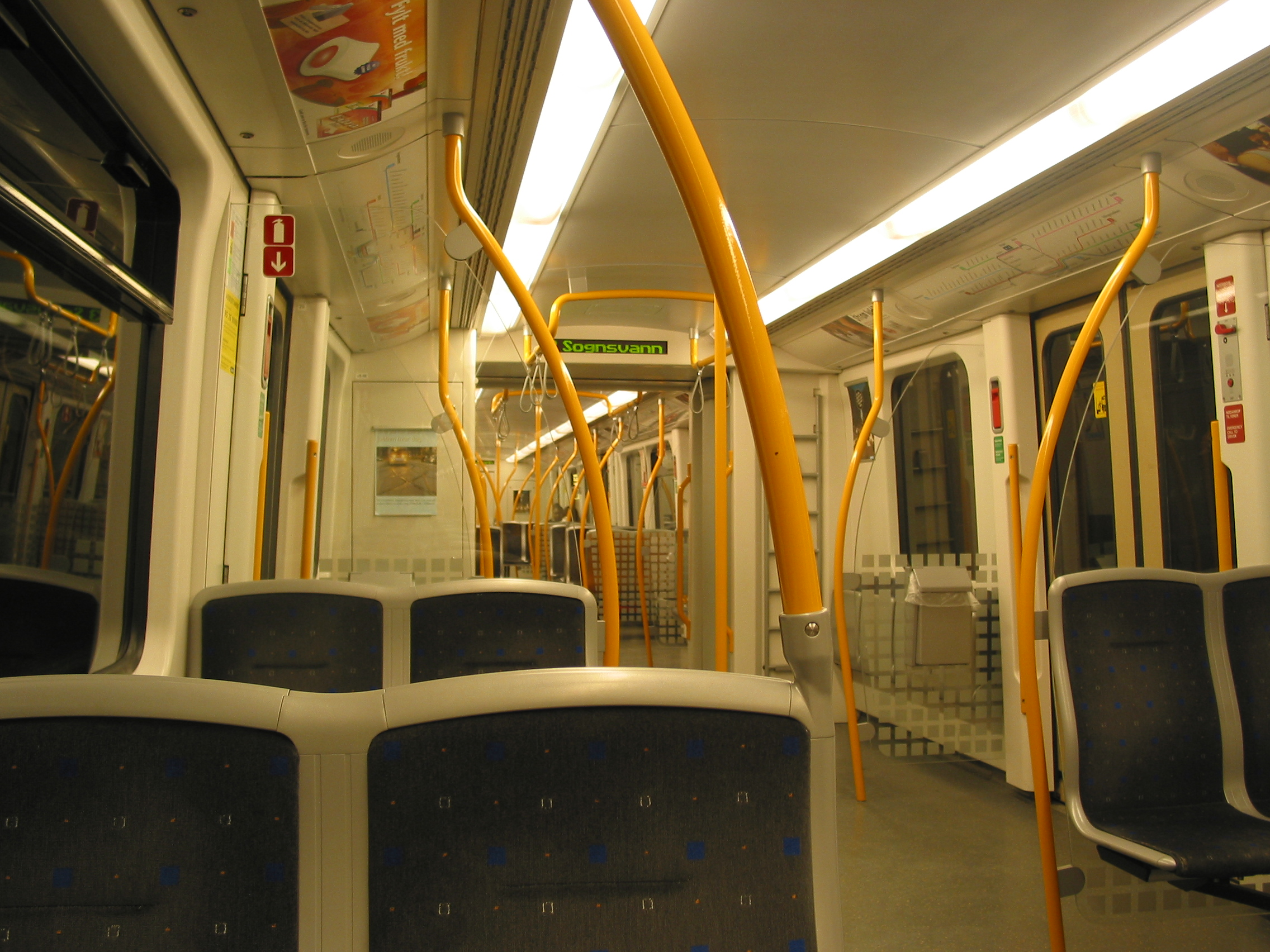
MX3000 interior

The MX3000 is a three-car electric multiple unit built exclusively for the Oslo Metro by Siemens in Vienna, Austria. The units are designed by Porsche Design Studio, and have a body in aluminum. A three-car train is 54.14 meters (177 ft 7 in) long; the end cars are 18.11 meters (59 ft 5 in) long each, while the center car is 17.92 meters (58 ft 10 in) long. The cars are 3.16 meters (10 ft 4 in) wide and 3.68 meters (12.1 ft) tall. An empty three-car unit weighs 98 tonnes (96 long tons; 108 short tons), while it with full payload weighs 147 tonnes (145 long tons; 162 short tons).

Each three-car unit has 138 seats, and a total capacity of 493 riders. There are three doors on each side of each car, measuring 1,300 millimeters (4 ft 3 in) wide and 1,900 millimeters (6 ft 3 in) high. In service, the units either run single (with three cars) or two units in multiple (with six cars). Each car is equipped with four three-phase asynchronous 140-kilowatt (190 hp) motors, giving each three-car unit a power output of 1,680 kilowatts (2,250 hp).

The MX3000 introduced a number of technical innovations to the metro. Regenerative brakes allow the dynamic brakes to feed the braking energy back to the power system via the third rail. The passengers also have air conditioning. The driver's cabs are more ergonomic than in the older models, and the mirrors to monitor the platforms have been replaced with cameras and screens. The trains' livery is white with gray detailing, instead of the former models' red with blue detailing. For use in areas without a third rail, such as at depots, the trains are equipped with a 110 V battery. This will remove the need for shunting at the depots and cut costs.
