= Oslo Vognselskap =

Norwegian publicly-owned company

Oslo Vognselskap (English: Oslo Rolling Stock Company) is a municipally owned company that maintains, upgrades and hires the Oslo Metro rolling stock to Ruter. It was established in 2007 as a subsidiary of Kollektivtransportproduksjon, and split out in the same year. In 2010, the company bought 96 new wagons from Siemens for NOK 1.5 billion, which will be delivered in the autumn of 2012.
