= Sinsen Line =

Tram line in Oslo, Norway

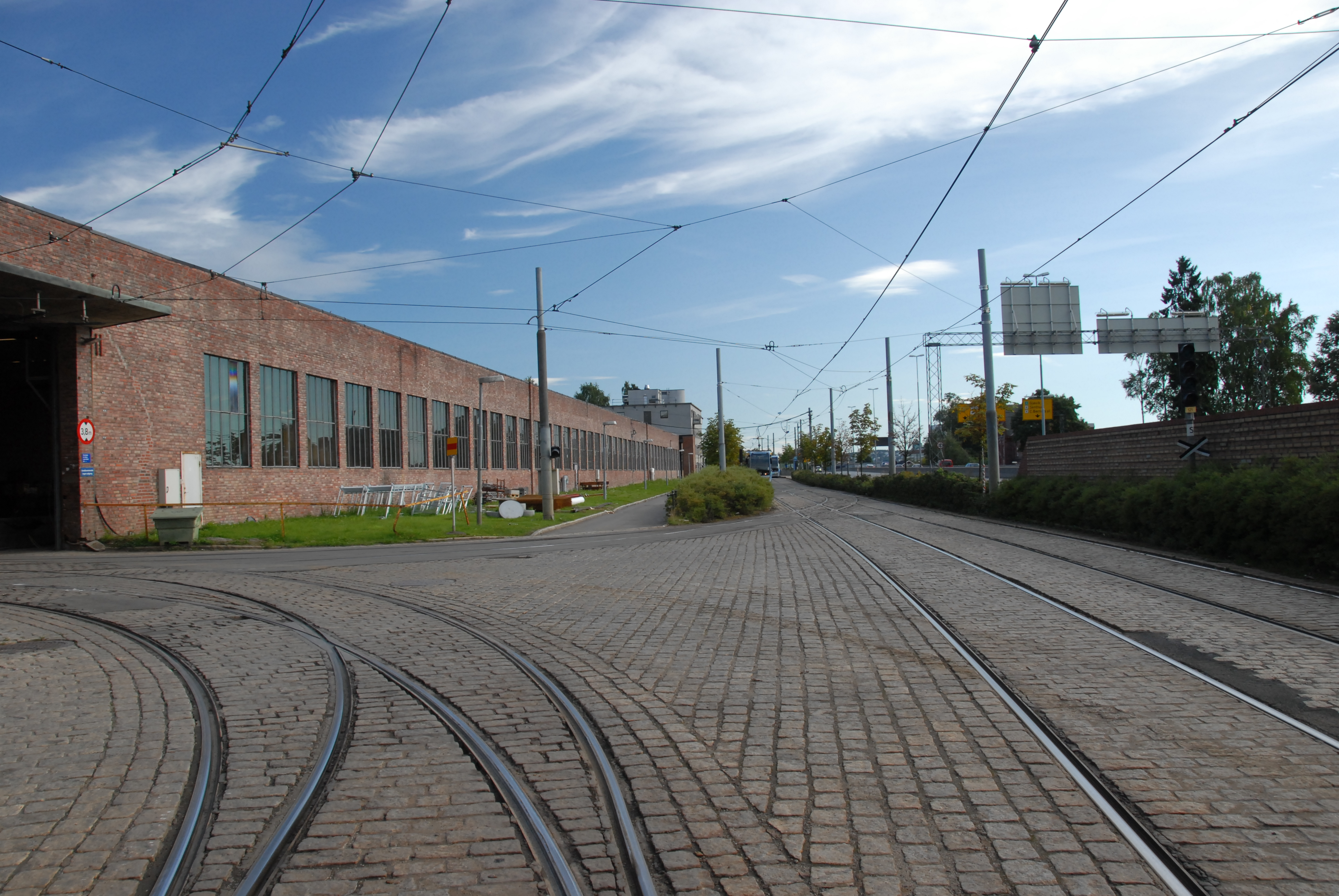
- Tram sheds at Grefsen along the Sinsen Line

Overview
- Native name: Sinsenlinjen
- Owner: Sporveien
- Locale: Oslo, Norway
- Termini: Jernbanetorget; Storo

Service
- Type: Tramway
- System: Oslo Tramway
- Operator(s): Sporveien Trikken
- Depot(s): Grefsen tram depot
- Rolling stock: SL95

History
- Opened: 1 February 1923

Technical
- Number of tracks: Double
- Track gauge: 1,435 mm (4 ft 8 1/2 in)
- Electrification: 750 V DC
- Operating speed: 50 km/h (31 mph)

The Sinsen Line (Norwegian: Sinsenlinjen) is part of the Oslo Tramway on the east side of the city. Most of the line is served by line 17, although the northernmost tip (Grefsen–Torshov) is served by line 18 which otherwise runs on the Grünerløkka–Torshov Line. Both services use SL95 articulated trams.

== Route ==
The line leaves the Grünerløkka–Torshov Line on a northeastward track after crossing Akerselva. The line then runs along Trondheimsveien, passing Carl Berners plass until it reaches the Sinsen Interchange, then along Storovegen (part of Ring 3), past the tram sheds at Grefsen, until it rejoins with the Grünerløkka–Torshov Line.

At Grefsen Station, there is transfer to the Oslo Commuter Rail along the Gjøvik Line. At Carl Berners plass and Storo, there is a transfer to the Oslo T-bane lines 4 and 5.

== History ==
The Rodeløkka Line was first opened on 27 March 1900 as a double track from Nybrua along Trondheimsveien before it branched off at Helgesens gate towards Rodeløkka. Built by Kristiania Sporveisselskap, the initial Sinsen Line was built as a single-track branch of the Rødeløkka Line that continued along Trondheimsveien to just north of Carl Berners plass and opened on 1 February 1923. It was served by the newly created Line 13 that operated through the city center to Skillebekk on the Skøyen Line. It ran every twelve minutes, but was times with Line 9 of the Rodeløkka Line so they gave a six-minute headway on the shared section to the city center.

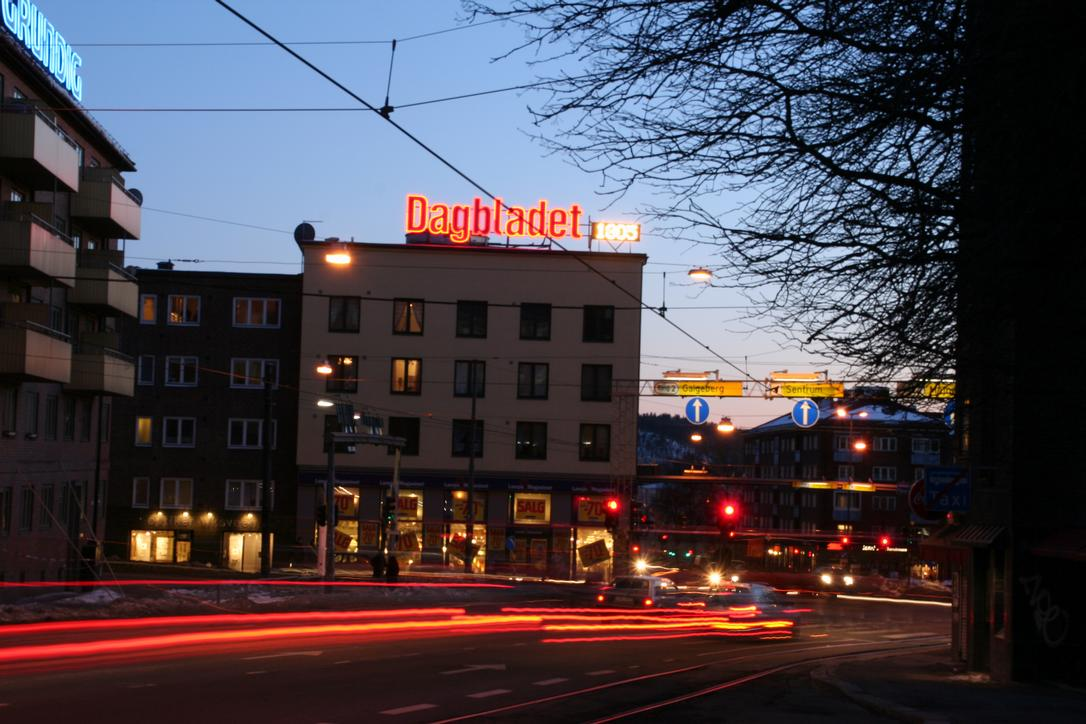
Carl Berners plass

KSS and hence the line was taken over by Oslo Sporveier on 1 May 1924. From 4 May the line was instead operated by Line 3 to Skøyen, but this was changed back for Line 13 on 29 June. This time the headway was increased to fifteen minutes. From 29 May 1927, Line 12 which connected to the Briskeby Line took over the route. From 19 January 1937, the Sinsen Line was again served by Line 3 to Skøyen. On 28 June 1938, the section from the branch with the Rodeløkka Line to Carl Berners plass was rebuilt to double track. From 28 June 1939, Line 3 followed the Vestbanen Line to Skøyen. From 19 December, the line was extended along Trondheimsveien to Sinsen; this section was built with double track. From 18 February 1940, Line 3 was again moved back to the Skøyen Line to Skøyen and the line started using the new Gullfisk trams. At the same time, Line 13 was changed to run from along the Sagene Ring via the city center to Sinsen. In 1948, the tracks at Carl Berners plass was rebuilt to run through the roundabouts at both ends of the square.

The trams along the Rodeløkka Line were terminated from 6 February 1949 and replaced by buses. At the same time, trolleybus lines were installed to cross the tram lines at Carl Berners plass and Line 13 was moved to run along the Kjelsås Line, leaving only Lines 1 and 3. On 7 July 1952, the Gullfisk were replaced with SM53 units. From 5 July 1953, Line 3 operated via Oslo East Station. From 7 September 1953, Line 17 that connected with the Ullevål Hageby Line started running along the Sinsen Line, as did the rush-hour only Line 14E which connected with the Frogner Line. From 4 July 1954, Line 1 was moved to connect to Oslo East Station, while Line 14E was terminated and Line 3 was moved to operate via Dronningens gate. From 30 August, the rush-hour only Line 15E was also run along the Sinsen Line, and otherwise followed mostly the same route as Line 1, except that it ran through Dronningens gate instead of the East Station.

A new branch line to Rodeløkka was opened on 2 January 1955, because the tram gave lower operating costs than the bus. The line ran from Carl Berners plass down Dælenengata and then used the block Dælenengata–Fagerheimgata–Marstrandgata–Københavngata–Dæenengata as a balloon loop. Line 13 was moved to serve the Rodeløkka Line. From 22 May 1956, Line 15E was terminated. During 1957, an extension from Sinsen to the Grefsen Depot was built. Here the line connected to the Grünerløkka–Torshov Line. Line 17 was extended to Grefsen, where it continued as Line 10 along the Grünerløkka–Torshov Line. The same year, the last Gullfisk were removed from service on the Sinsen Line. From 1959, the Rodeløkka Line was reduced to a rush-hour only service and was terminated on 23 April 1961. The tracks were removed from 1962 to 1964, and the southern section re-designated to the Sinsen Line. From 25 June 1961, Line 17 was terminated and the section from Sinsen via Grefsen to Storo was taken out of service, although the tracks were kept to allow access to the depot. At the same time, Line 3 was replaced with Line 7, which connected to the Ullevål Hageby Line.

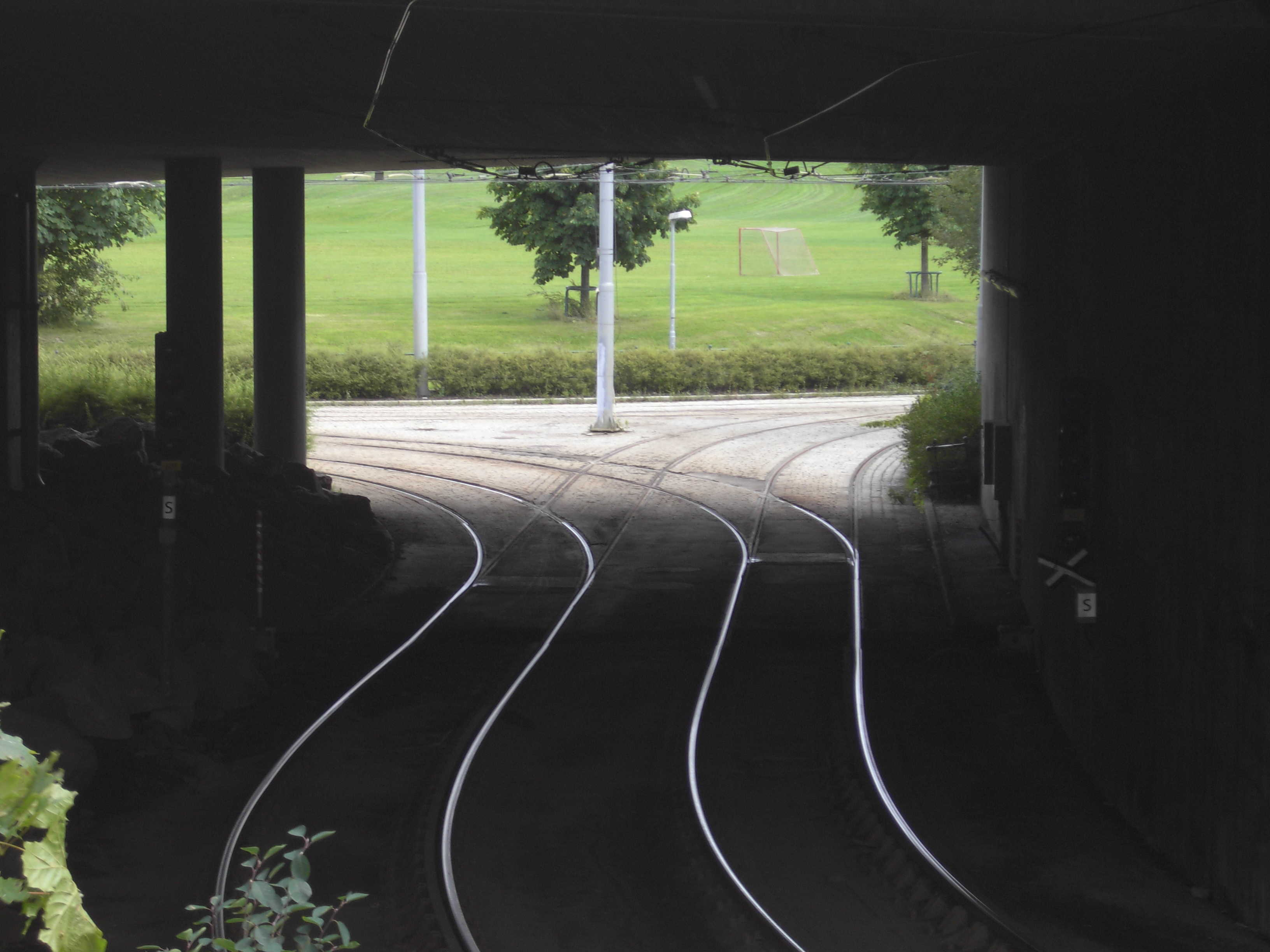
The line at Muselund

In 1968, the trolleybus lines were removed from Carl Berners plass, and the following year the Sinsen Interchange was rebuilt to a two-level interchange. Because of this, the old balloon loop at Sinsen had to be demolished and replaced with a new further north at Muselunden, that was taken into use on 16 October 1969. During the end of 1977 and in early 1978, a trial articulated tram from Duewag was tested on Sinsen Line on Lines 1 and 7. In December 1978, the tram lines between Carl Berners plass and Rosenhoff were moved adjacent to the sidewalk. From 6 December 1982, Line 1 was operated without a conductor and from 2 January 1983 also on Line 7. From 2 April, the SL79 articulated tram was put into service on both lines.

The line was among those proposed for closure in 2002 when the tram company attempted to save money by transferring the traffic to buses. A city grant of 25 million kr saved the line along with several others.

== Future expansion ==
Plans for a tramway to Tonsenhagen were launched in the 1950s, and in 1954 the city council zoned the necessary area for the route. Modified versions of the plans were again passed by the city council in 1986, with subsequent zoning passed in 1993. The proposed line will continue along Trondheimsveien in its own right-of-way down the center of the road. A new station will be built at Sinsenterrassen, for both trams and buses. The line will receive a station serving Aker University Hospital, before the line runs to Bjerke in a culvert under Norwegian National Road 4 and Traverveien. The line will the run from Årvoll to Tonsenhagen, with part of the route planned as a conventional street tram in mixed traffic to eliminate the need for expropriation on the east side of Årvollveien and impact on parks.

The project is estimated to give a profit for Ruter of NOK 7 million per year and have an economic positive impact for society of NOK 20 million. The line will remove the substantial parallel running of trams along Trondheimsveien and the Sinsen Line and the current bus line 31 can be terminated. Trams are more energy efficient and give less global and local pollution than buses, increasing the positive impact. The project is presumed financed through Oslo Package 3.
