= Rodeløkka =

Neighborhood of Oslo

Coordinates: 59°55′28″N 10°46′08″E

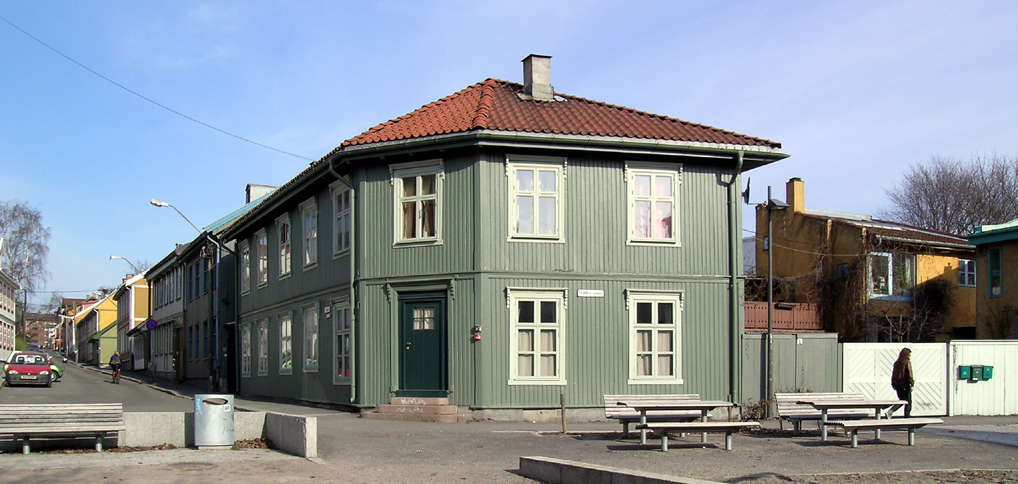
Langgata

Rodeløkka is a neighborhood in Grünerløkka in Oslo, Norway.

== History ==
From 1900 to 1961, it was served by the Rodeløkka Line of the Oslo Tramway.

== The name ==
The property was bought by the dean Frederik Rode in 1854. The last element is the finite form of løkke f 'paddock'.
