= Egertorget =

Square in Oslo, Norway

Coordinates: 59.9128°N 10.7419°E

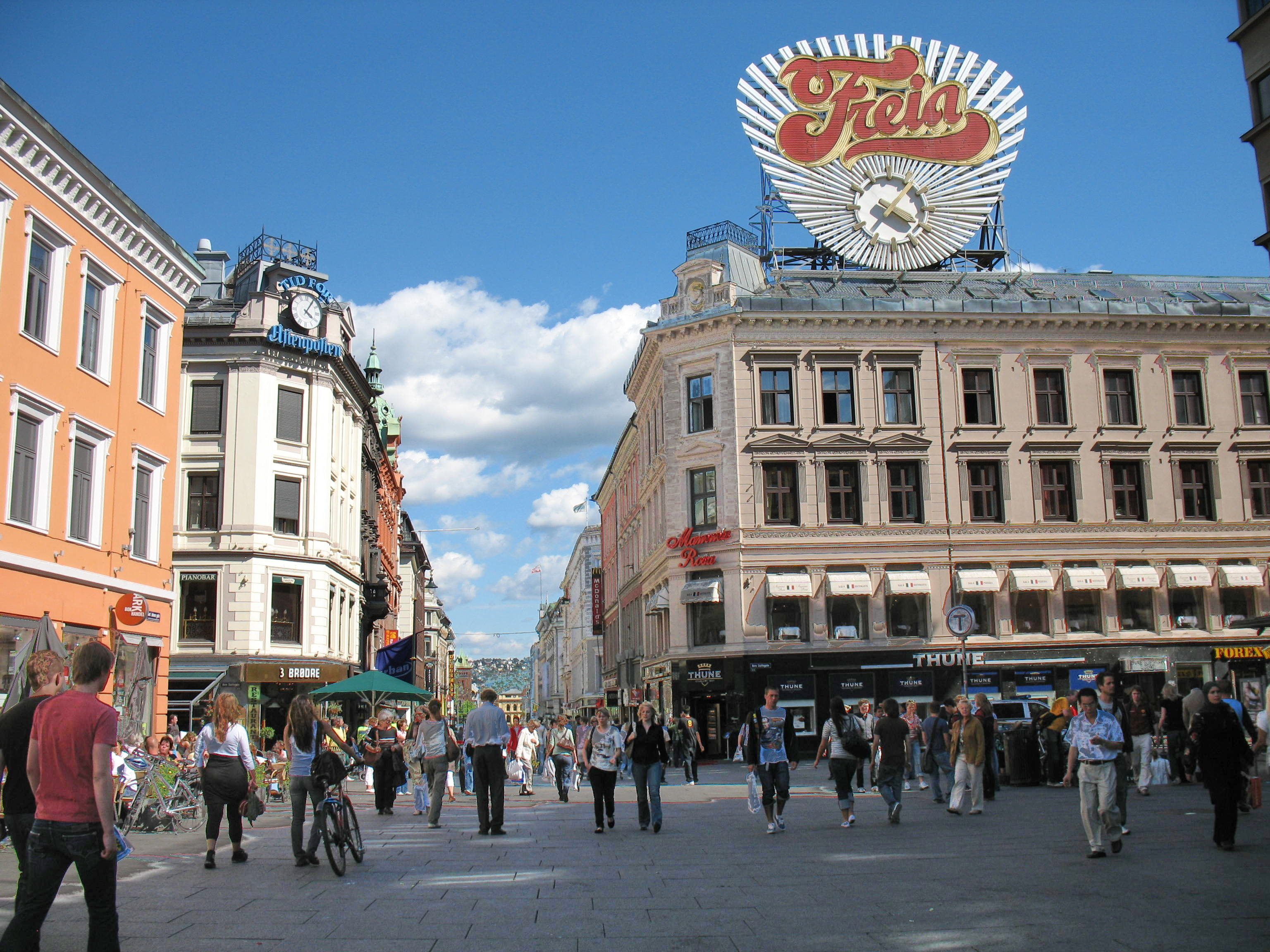
Egertorget in 2007

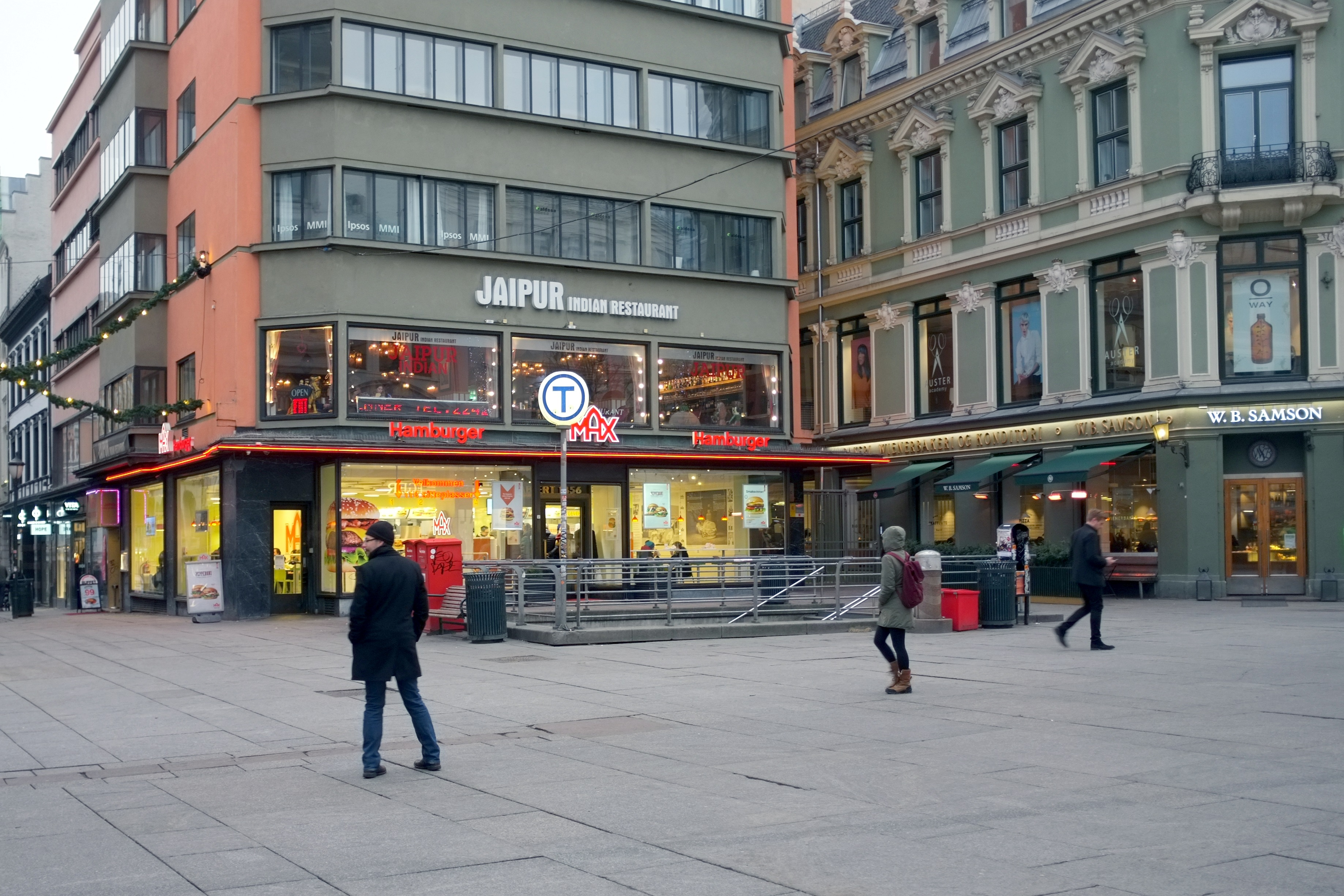
Egertorget Square

Egertorget is a pedestrian mall located at the intersection of Karl Johans gate and Øvre Slottsgate in Oslo, Norway.

== History ==
Egertorget is a square which arose around 1840 where Karl Johans gate and Øvre slottsgate crossed each other alongside Stabellkroken. Both Stabellgården and Egergården were torn down in order to tie the streets together. The square derived it name from brothers Herman Eger (1816–1883) and Thorvald Eger (1827–1901), brewers who had owned the displaced Egergården.

Egertorget has one of the entrances to Stortinget Station of the Oslo Metro. Egertorget square is a retail shopping area. Many outdoor cafes wreathe the square, with Presseklubben and 3 brødre being the most well-known. In summer, Egertorget is also home to many street musicians and jugglers.

== Gallery ==
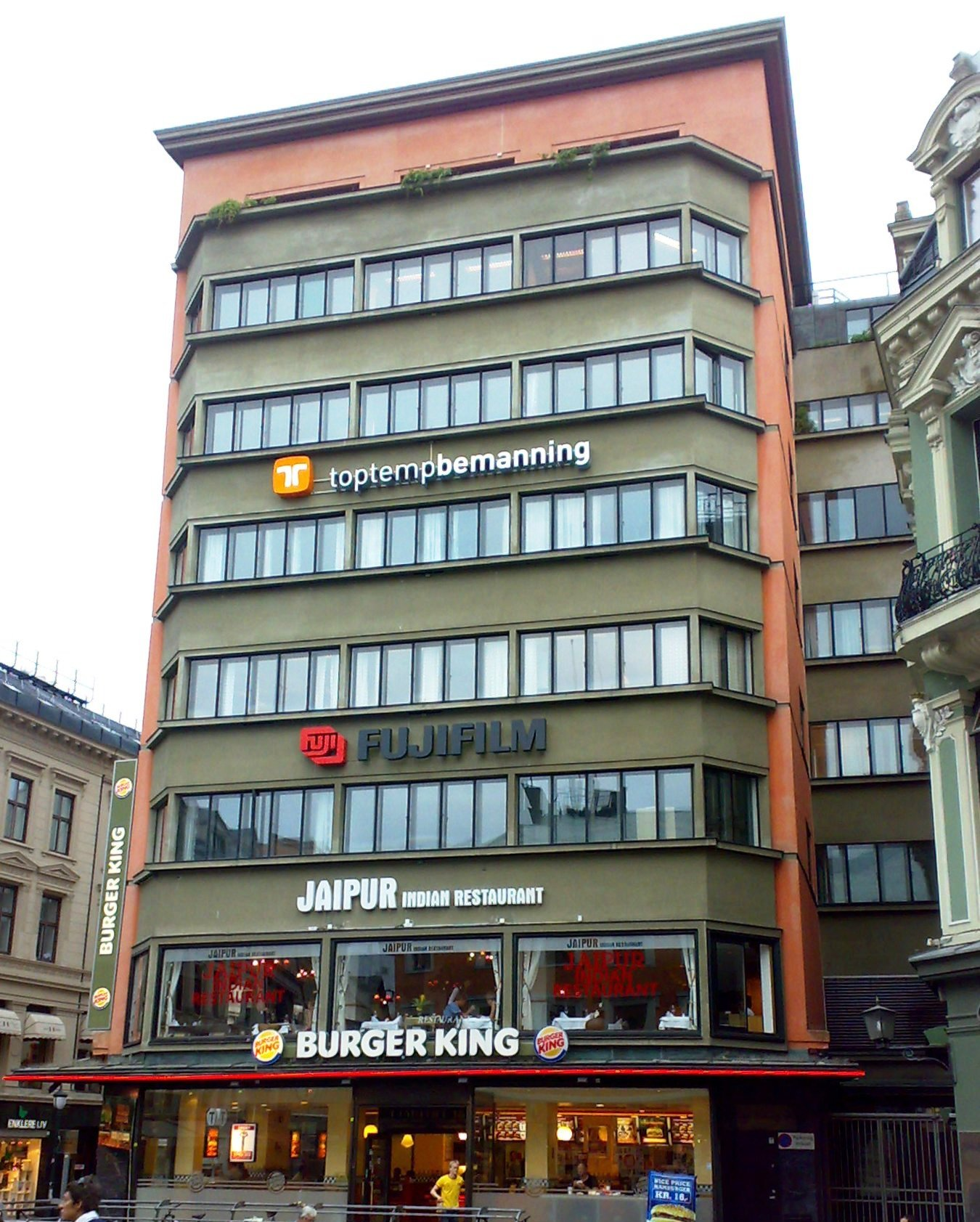
Horngården in Egertorget at Øvre Slottsgate and Karl Johans gate

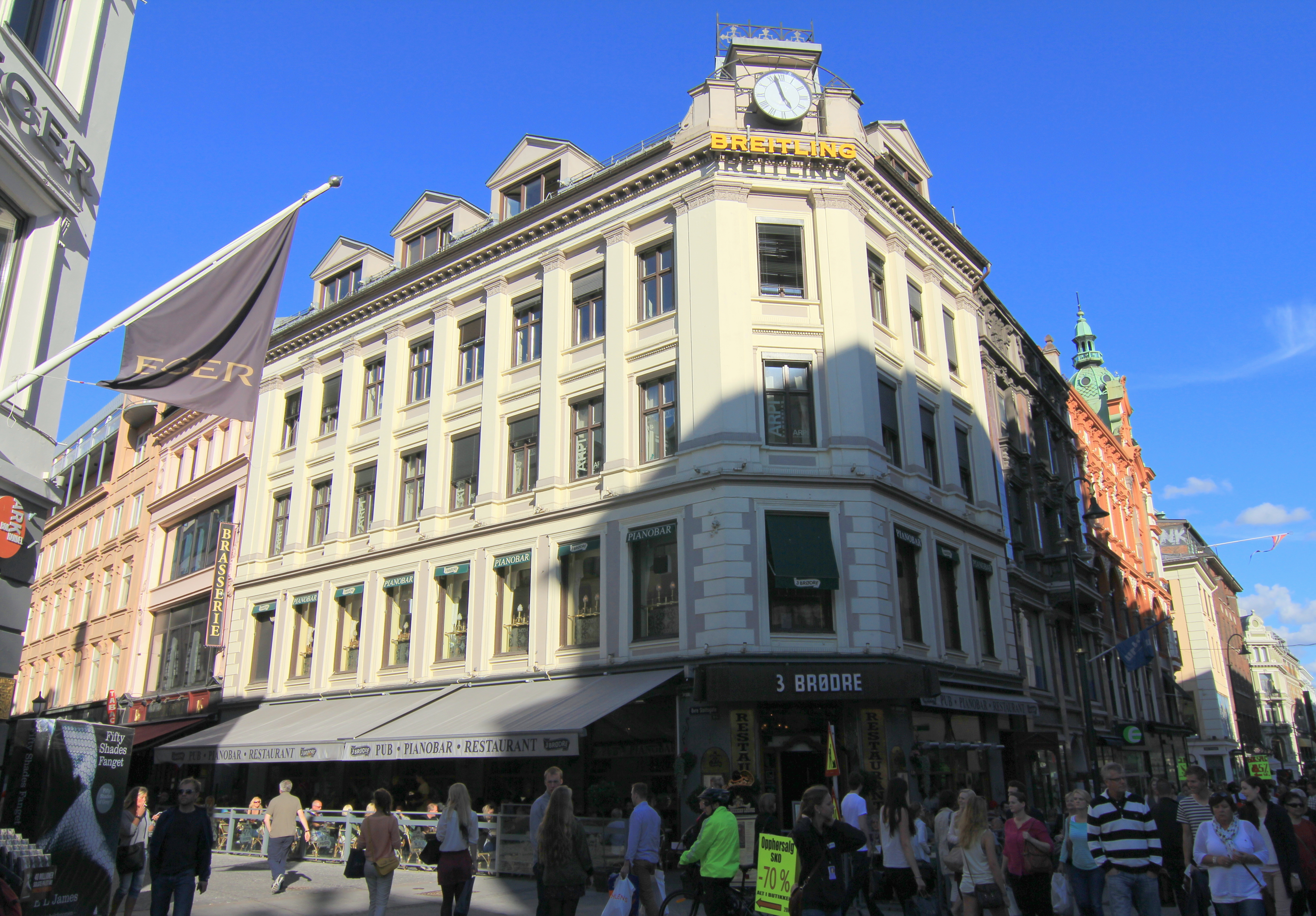
Brødrene Hallèns hanskeforretning at Øvre Slottsgate

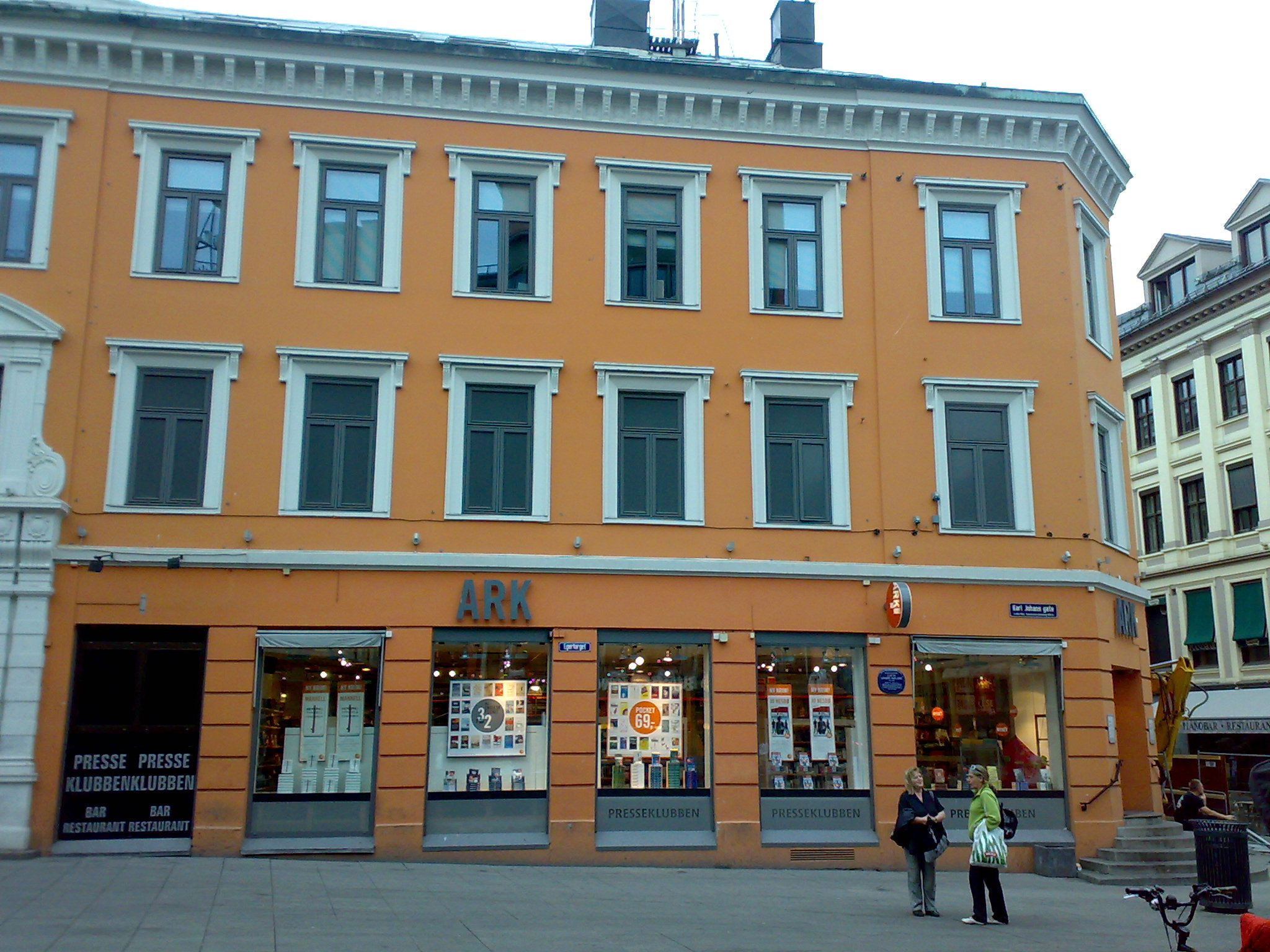
Bokhandelen Ark at . Øvre Slottsgate 23 on the corner with Karl Johans gate

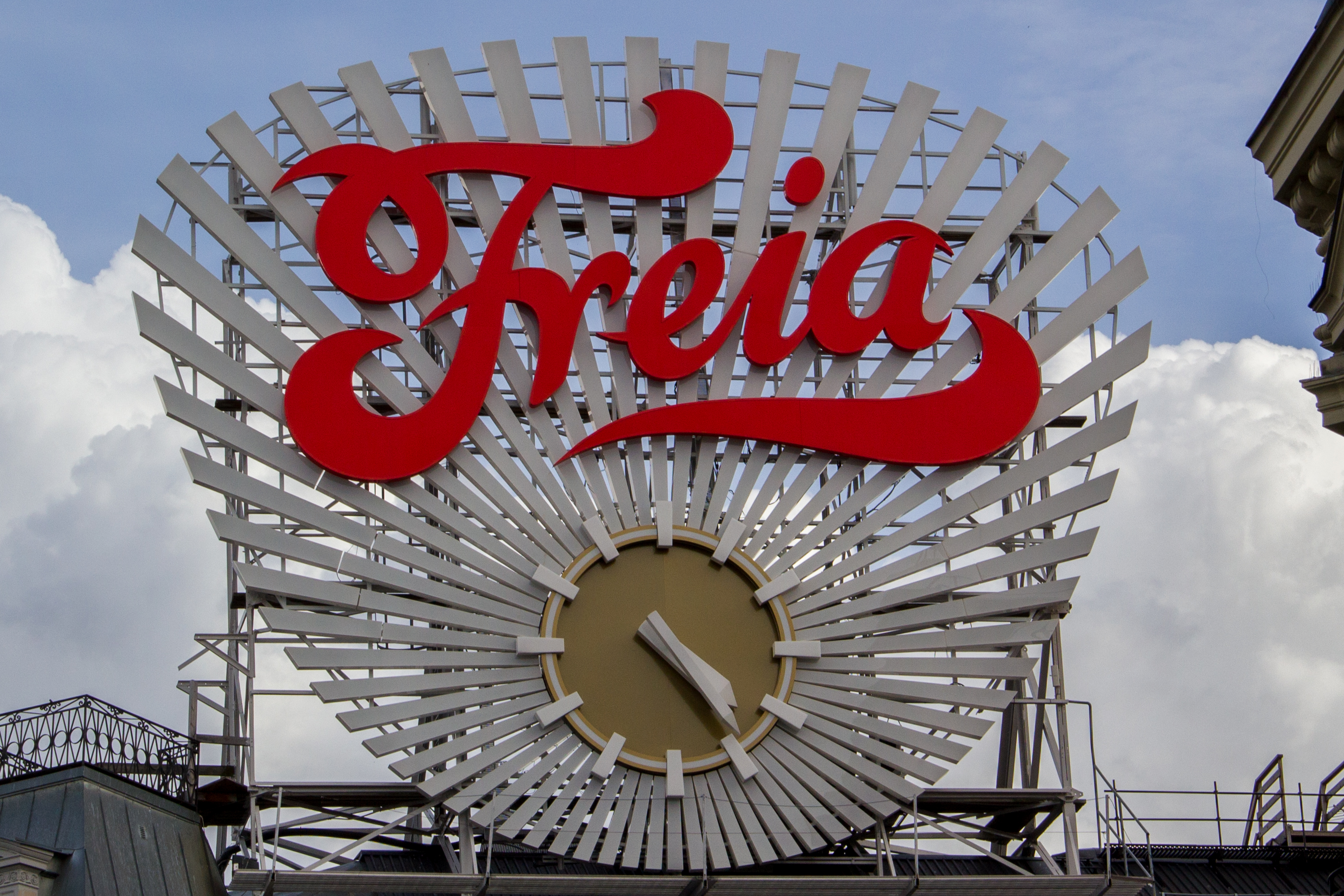
Freia clock at Egertorget square
