= M25 606 =

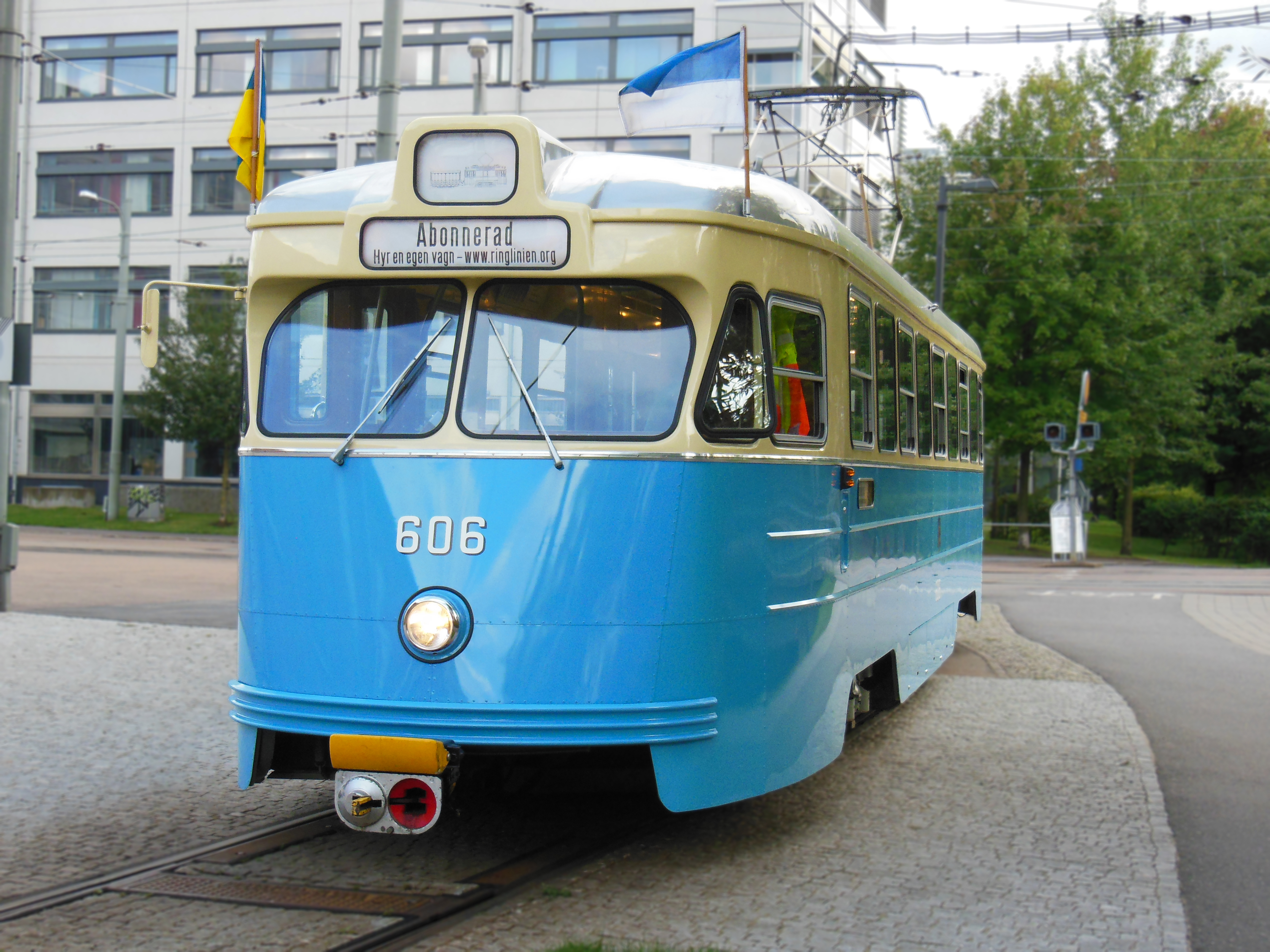
- M25 606 in August 2014.
- In service: 1961–1988
- Manufacturer: Hägglunds
- Constructed: 1961
- Refurbished: 1969
- Capacity: 38 sitting passengers, 78 standing passengers
- Owners: Gothenburg Municipality

Specifications
- Car length: 14,160 mm (46.46 ft)
- Width: 2,650 mm (8.69 ft)
- Wheel diameter: 680 mm (27 in)
- Wheelbase: 1,800 mm (71 in)
- Maximum speed: 60 km/h (37 mph)
- Weight: 17,700 kg (39,000 lb)
- Power output: 4x55 kW
- Current collector(s): Pantograph
- UIC classification: Bo'Bo'
- Track gauge: 1,435 mm (4 ft 8 1/2 in) standard gauge

M25 606 is a tram manufactured in 1961 by Hägglunds, commissioned by Göteborgs Spårvägar AB. The tram operated in regular service in Gothenburg, Sweden until 1988 when it was taken over by the Ringlinien tramway association. Ringlinien continues to operate the tram in museum service to this day.

== History ==
The delivery of the M25 trams began in the end of the 1950s, with tram 606 being delivered on 15 December 1961. Like the other M25s, 606 was delivered in left-hand traffic configuration with doors on the left side.

Due to the Dagen H (the right-hand traffic switch in Sweden) in 1967, the M25 trams were gradually converted to right-hand traffic configuration. Tram 606 was converted in 1969 and, during the period between the switch and the conversion, was operated in reverse to keep the doors on the "correct" side for the direction of travel. The conversion took place between 19 May and 29 September 1969. Among the changes were the relocation of the driver's cab from the right to the left side and the repositioning of the doors from the left to the right side. Additionally, a door was installed at the rear, and a conductor's position, previously located inside the front door, was removed.

On 28 April 1988, the tram became a museum piece and has since been stationed at the Gårdahallen depot in Gothenburg. The tram is maintained by Ringlinien but is owned by the City of Gothenburg. Ringlinien has restored the tram to its appearance immediately following the right-hand traffic conversion.

== Photos ==
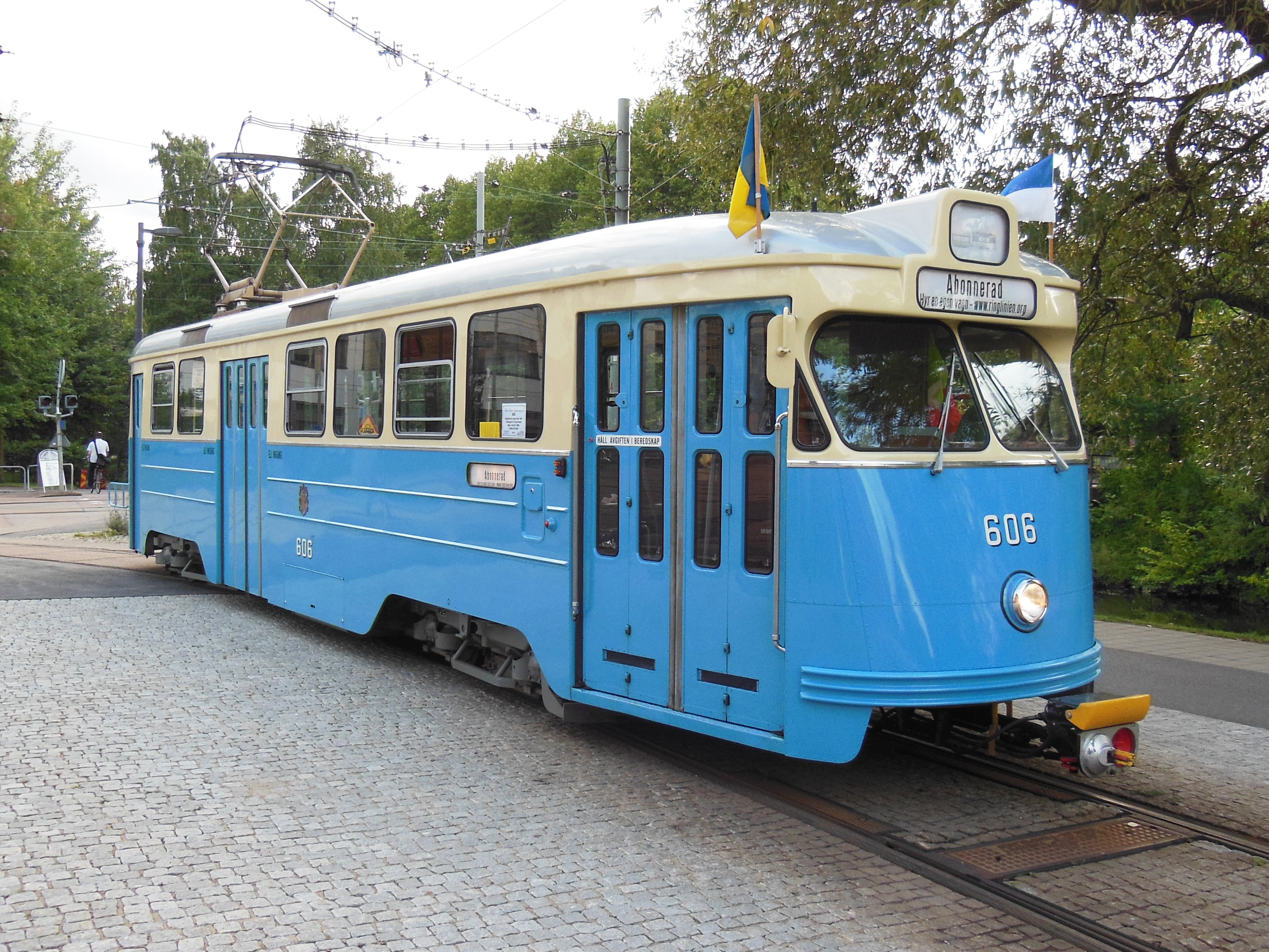
Tram 606 parked on Åvägen in Gothenburg.

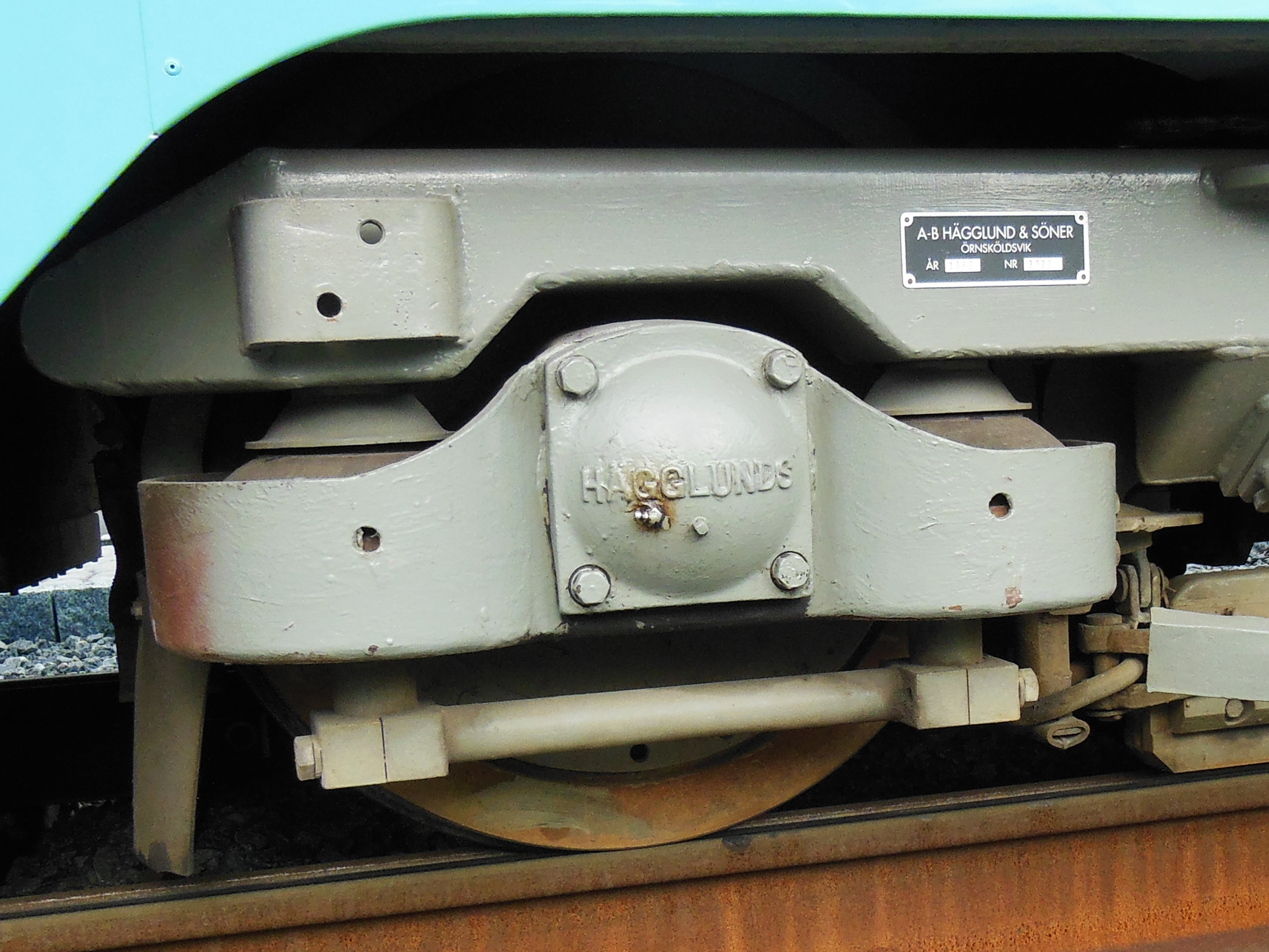
One of the tram's wheels.

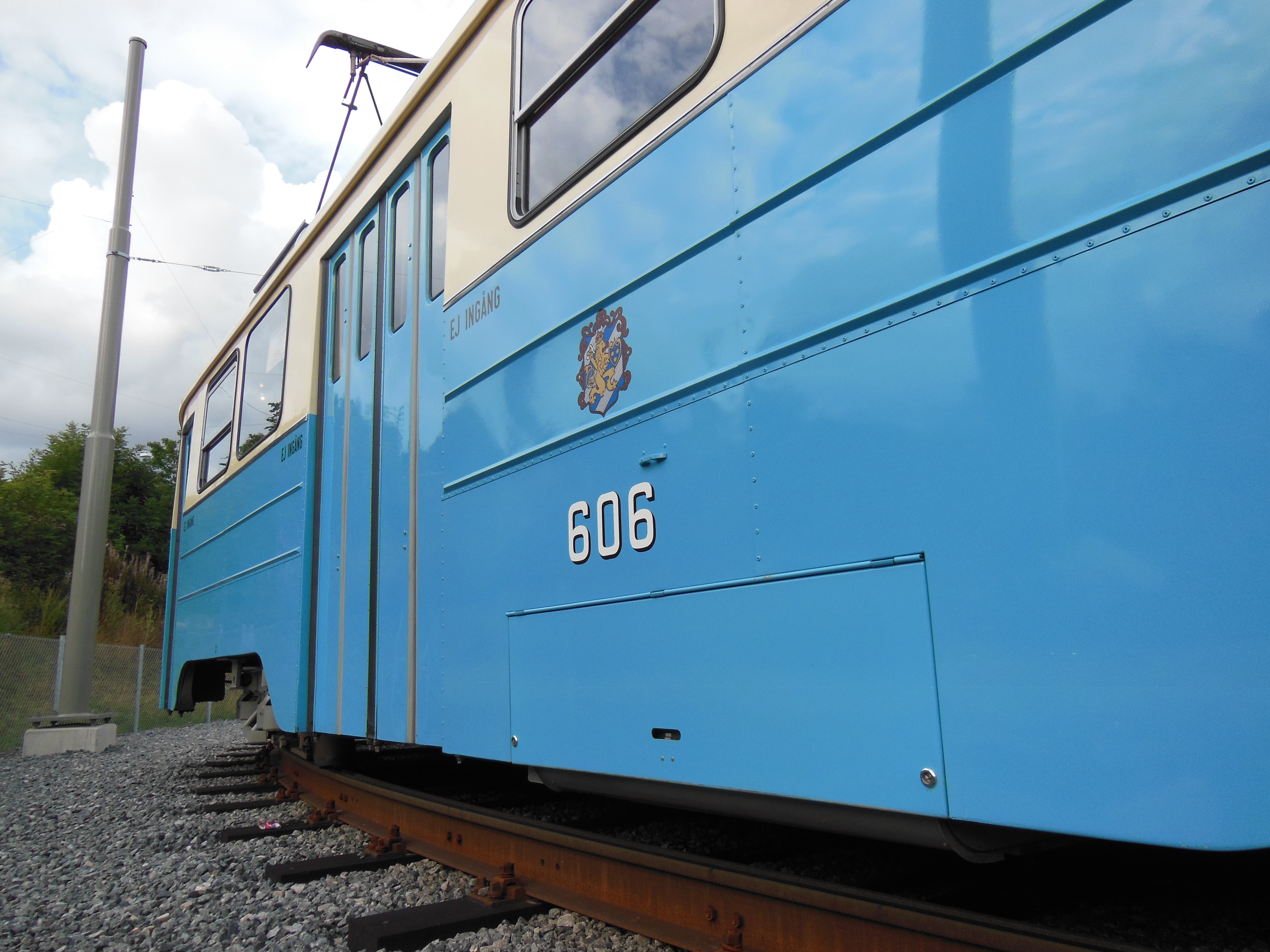
Tram 606 in the Nymånegatan turning loop.
