= SM53 =

Class of Norwegian trams

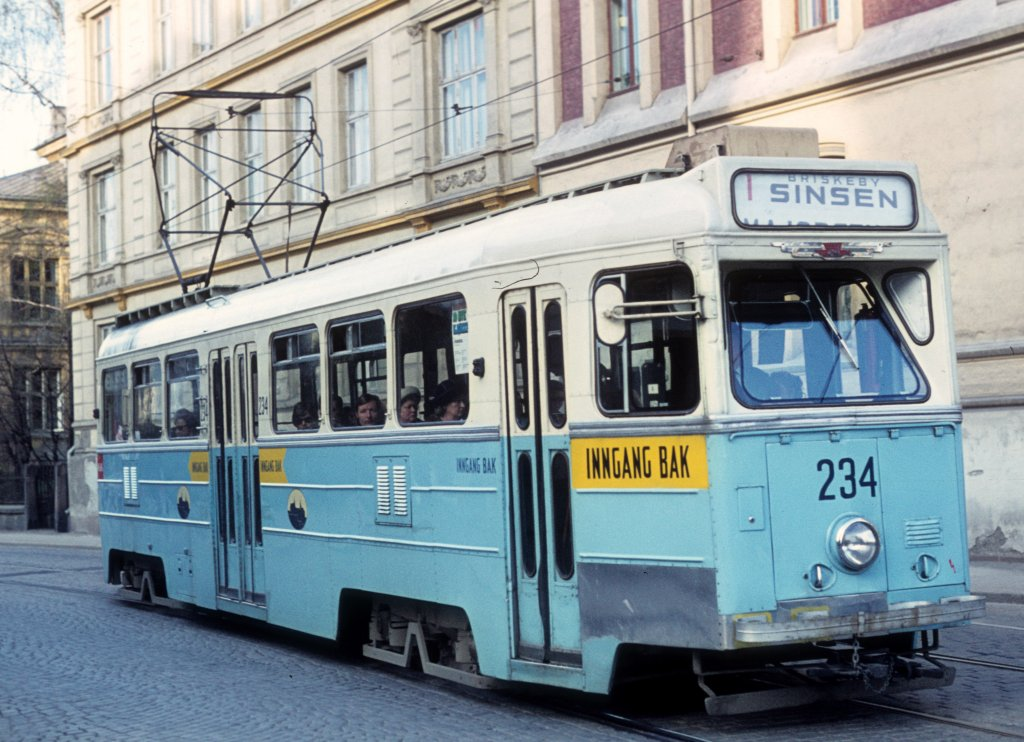
- SM53 in Holtegata on the Briskeby Line in 1971

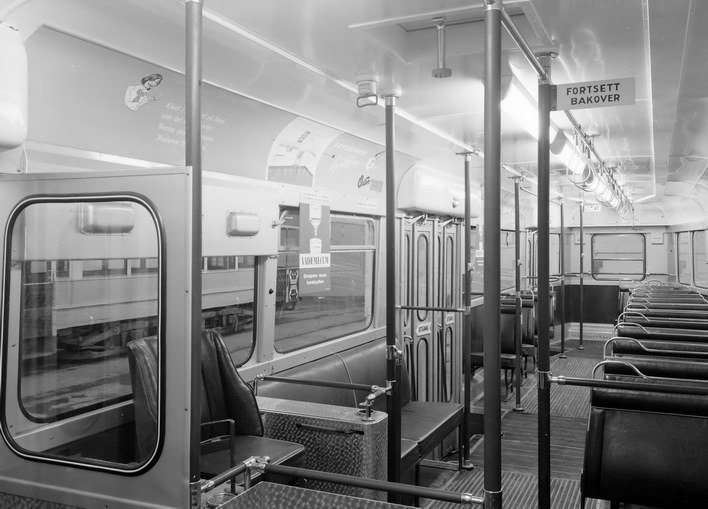
- Interior of an original trailer, with the conductor's seat to the left
- In service: 1952–2000
- Manufacturers: Høka; Hägglund
- Family name: Mustang
- Constructed: 1952–58
- Refurbished: 1985–91 (SM83)
- Number built: 58
- Number scrapped: 42
- Fleet numbers: 204–253
- Capacity: 116
- Operator: Oslo Sporveier
- Line served: Oslo Tramway

Specifications
- Car body construction: Steel
- Car length: 14,700 mm (48 ft 2 3/4 in)
- Width: 2,500 mm (8 ft 2 7/16 in)
- Doors: 3
- Maximum speed: 60 km/h (37 mph)
- Weight: 16.9 t (16.6 long tons; 18.6 short tons)
- Prime mover: Hägglund MBL 10
- Power output: 180 kW (240 hp)
- Electric system: 600 V DC overhead line
- Track gauge: 1,435 mm (4 ft 8 1/2 in) standard gauge

SM53, originally designed MBO and colloquially known as Høka, were a class of 58 trams and 50 trailers built by Høka and Hägglund for Oslo Sporveier. The units were used on the Norway's Oslo Tramway from 1952 until 2000. The 14.7-meter (48 ft 2 3/4 in) long and 2.5-meter (8 ft 2 7/16 in) wide trams weighed 16.9 tonnes (16.6 long tons; 18.6 short tons). They had four motors providing a combined power output of 180 kilowatts (240 hp), allowing for a top speed of 60 kilometers per hour (37 mph).

The first series of thirty trams in 1950, with delivery in 1952 and 1953. These were designated MBO50. The next order was for new bodies for used Class SS units. The eight motor units were designated MO and nicknamed Chickens, while the twelve trailers were designated TO. These twin-axle units proved unsuccessful and Oslo Sporveier therefore took deliver of more MBO units. The next batch of twelve MBO55 units were delivered in 1957 and the final batch of eight were designated MBO56 and delivered in 1958. These were built for use on the Lambertseter Line, but were found unsuitable for use on light rail service and later moved back to the streets. From 1985 to 1991 eleven units were rebuilt with new cabs, interior and fronts, and designated SM83. Retirement of the class started in 1980 with Chickens. The series were gradually replaced, with the last SM53 units being taken out of service in 1997. The last SM83 were taken out of use in 2000.

== History ==
=== Order and original series ===
At the end of the Second World War Oslo Sporveier had a fleet of 331 trams, of which only the 46 Gullfisk trams were modern bogie-constructions. The remaining were twin-axle and limited in capacity. Oslo Sporveier needed more and newer matériel and considered several options. More Gullfisk were considered, but their aluminum bodies were found to be unsuitable, they had issues with cracks in the bogies and their electrical system was prone to faults. They were design with entrance through the middle door, which had during the high usage during the war proven to be inefficient and often led to two conductors being needed for each car. By then flow-through units with a stationary conductor had become common. There were also significant developments within controllers and 300-volt motors. As such additional orders for Gullfisk were discarded.

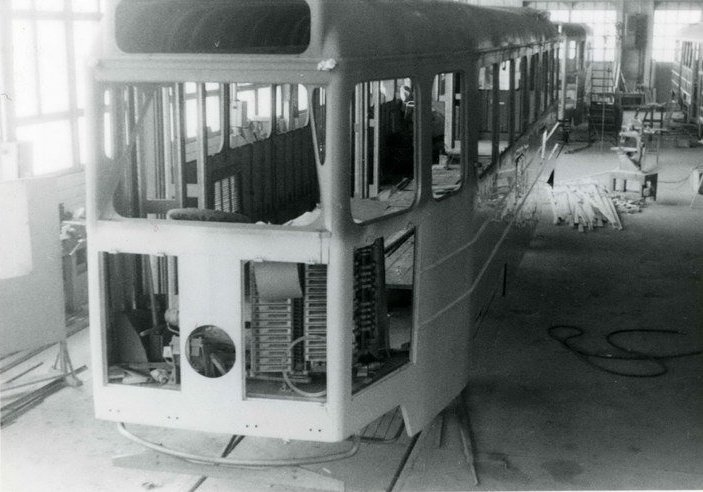
Construction of an original batch of trams at Høka in Hønefoss in 1952

An invitation for tenders was issued in 1947. Ateliers de Constructions Electriques de Charleroi offered to build a European adoption of the PCC streetcar, although the necessary licenses for Scandinavia were held by Svenska Järnvägsverkstäderna. The trams met all of Oslo Sporveier's demands, except their high power usage. However, the downside was the high price and that foreign production would require currency exchange licenses, which could be complicated because part of the price was for royalties.

The second offer came from Strømmens Værksted and Norsk Elektrisk & Brown Boveri, for an enlarged model of the Class 1947 being built for the Bergen Tramway. It was a variant of a standardized tram built by Brown, Boveri & Cie. for the Swiss tram market. The final offer was from Hägglund and Høka for a variant of Hägglund's Mustang. These were in various versions being delivered to the tramways in Stockholm, Gothenburg and Malmö.

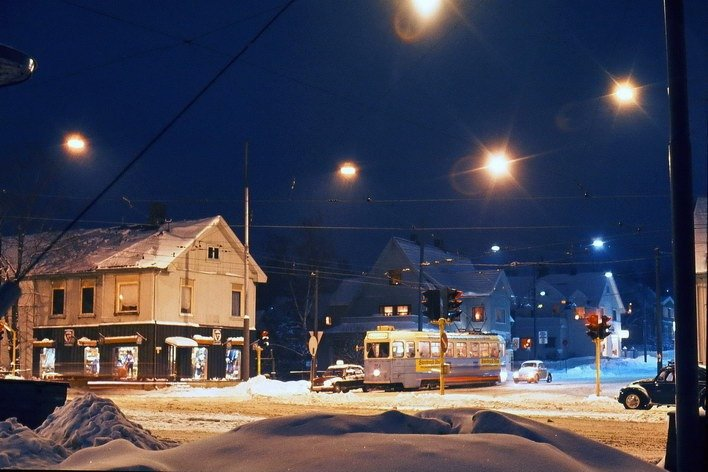
Tram 204 serving the Kjelsås Line at the intersection at Storo in 1978

Oslo Sporveier opted for Høka and Hägglund's bid and in 1950 signed an agreement to buy thirty motorized units with delivery in 1952, at 250,000 Norwegian krone per unit. Høka held the Norwegian rights to a Czechoslovak patent for wooden-filled steel profiles that Hägglund used in its design. The bodies were therefore built by Høka in Hønefoss, while Hägglund built the electrical and mechanical components. Final assembly was carried out by Hägglund and Oslo Sporveier at Sagene Depot in Oslo. The first tram arrived in Oslo on 1 September 1952 and, after final assembly and tests, entered revenue service on 11 November 1952.

The trams were first used on Line 13, which ran from the Sagene Line via Stortorvet to the Kjelsås Line. Half the original series was delivered by April 1953, allowing other lines to also use the new trams. The final tram of the original delivery series entered service on 14 December 1953. Upon delivery the trams had some issues with the controller. Upon occasion they would move to full speed or full brake without being activated by the motorman, causing a few minor accidents. It turned out that this was caused by a combination of mechanical weakness and user errors.

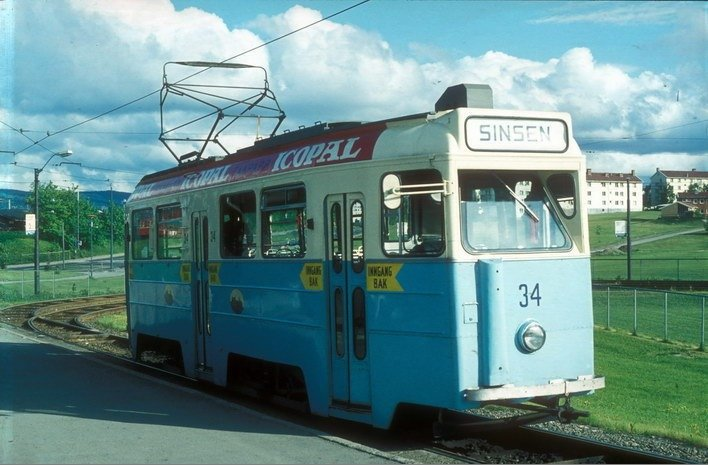
A "Chicken" on the loop of the Sinsen Line in 1975

=== "Chickens" ===
The original plan was to copy a concept from Stockholm, where the trams were run fast and frequently without trailers. However, Oslo Sporveier soon decided to prioritize operating costs and instead run trams and trailers. At first the company operated Class SS trailers, but these proved unsuitable in combination with the MBOs. Oslo Sporveier was not willing to pay the price for new trailers and therefore chose a combination whereby new bodies were built atop existing undercarriages. Two such contractions were built at Sagene Depot in 1953, designated TO52 and the first unit came into revenue service on 23 November. A major issue with the trailers were doors which would not shut properly, often resulting with the trams running with open doors.

Oslo Sporveier was considering the need for new trams, but were concerned because of the new trams having costs about twice the price of a Gullfisk. This led them into the idea of converting older trams by keeping the most costly parts, such as motors and wheelsets. However, the trams would receive new and larger bodies and interior. The company approved that twenty units be built, stipulating that fifty would be converted should it prove successful. Of the initial order, twelve were to be built as trailers and eight as motorized trams. They received new controllers and new braking system, and were largely rebuilt from Class U and Class SS units. The motorized version was designated MO52. They quickly received the nickname Chickens (Kylling), as a pun of being smaller than units built at Hønefoss (literally "Hen Falls"). The trailers were nicknamed Stiffsleds (Stivkjelke).

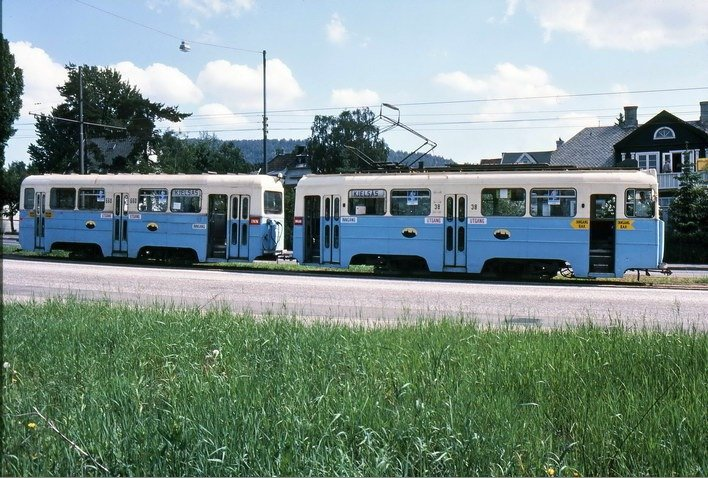
MO "Chicken" hauling a TO "Stiffsled" at Storo in 1975

The first Chicken, no. 33, was met with dissatisfaction by the employees. They were built without air brakes, which meant that the conductor would have to traverse a full tram to reach the emergency brake should the motorman fall unconscious. The railway authorities sided with the employees, requiring the company to rebuild the unit. A similar concern was raised concerning the trailers. As air brakes are fail safe, the trailers would automatically brake should the trailer become disconnected. With the need for pressurized air system in place, the advantages of pneumatic door were reaped. However, the pneumatics systems largely ate up the costs savings of rebuilding material. Most of the work was carried out at Sagene Depot, and was carried out between mid-1954 to 1958.

The Chickens were used on a limited number of routes, from 4 July 1954 on lines 0, 8 and 13, variously serving the Vippetangen Line, the Grünerløkka–Torshov Line, the Sagene Line and the Sinsen Line. From 1955 they also started running on the Rodeløkka Line. The TO trailers were usually run with the Chickens, although they were also hauled by the larger Høka units. The tramway experienced that the Chickens did not have sufficient pneumatic capacity to keep a tram and trailer stationary while stopped on slopes, as separate compressors in the trailers were not installed. This made operating trailers with the Chickens a safety hazard and soon they were only seen in solitude.

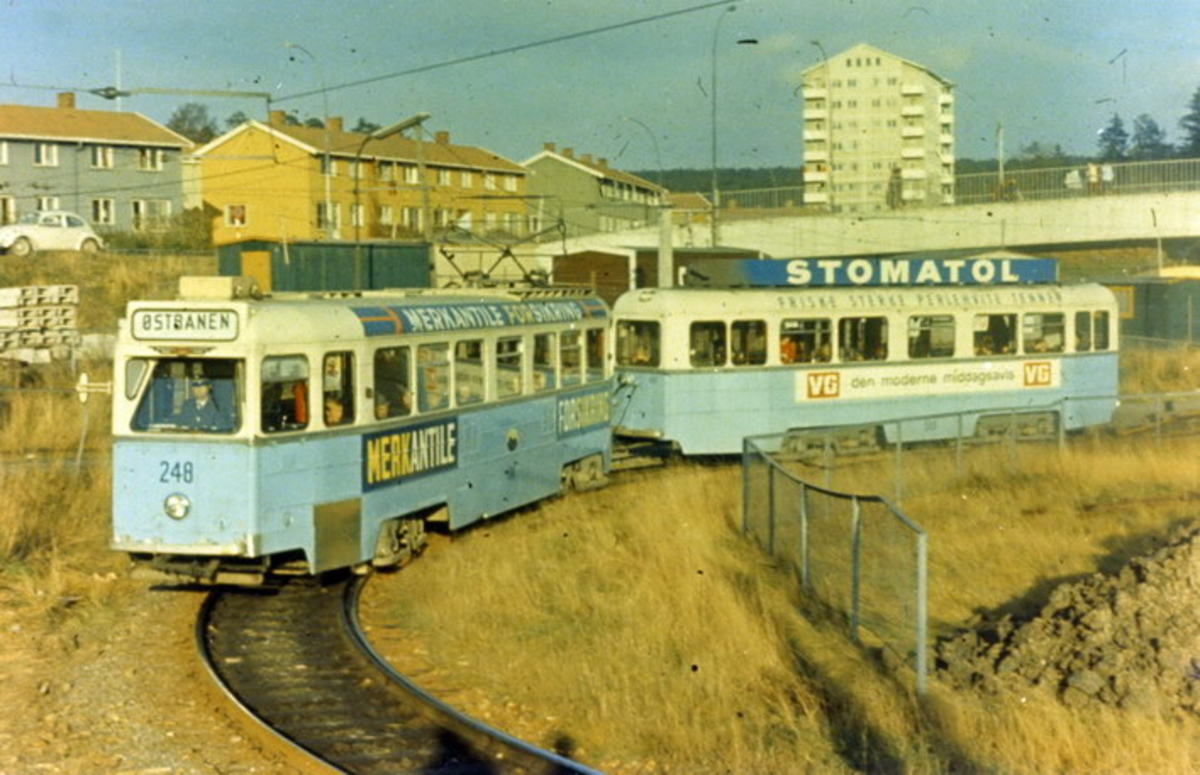
SM53 at Bøler in the 1960s

=== Suburban prologue ===
The Oslo Metro was approved of by the city council in 1951. It would consist of a common, underground section in the city center and above-ground lines in the suburbs. It was soon evident that one of the suburban lines, the Lambertseter Line, would be completed in the order of magnitude of a decade before it could be hooked to the Common Tunnel. A similar situation was true for the Østensjø Line, which had been completed as a tramway in 1923. Oslo Sporveier was therefore given the task of operating the lines as tramways until the metro could open. The company considered building additional MO and TO units and move the new bogie trams to the suburban lines, but the poor performance of the rebuilt units soon made the company change its mind.

Although Oslo Sporveier was determined to buy bogie trams, it considered options other than additional MBOs. A derivative of Stockholm's A24 was considered, as was a modernized Gullfisk with Vickers motors and two variations of Hägglund trams. The company considered multiple-unit trams, which would allow for faster speeds, but opted against this due to an increased fault rate and higher maintenance. A trial with the Gullfisk proved that it had low acceleration and speed and was shaking violently at high speeds, and the option was discarded. The company had two final options, additional MBO units or Vickers-based multiple units with bodies built by Hägglund and Høka, and motors from NEBB.

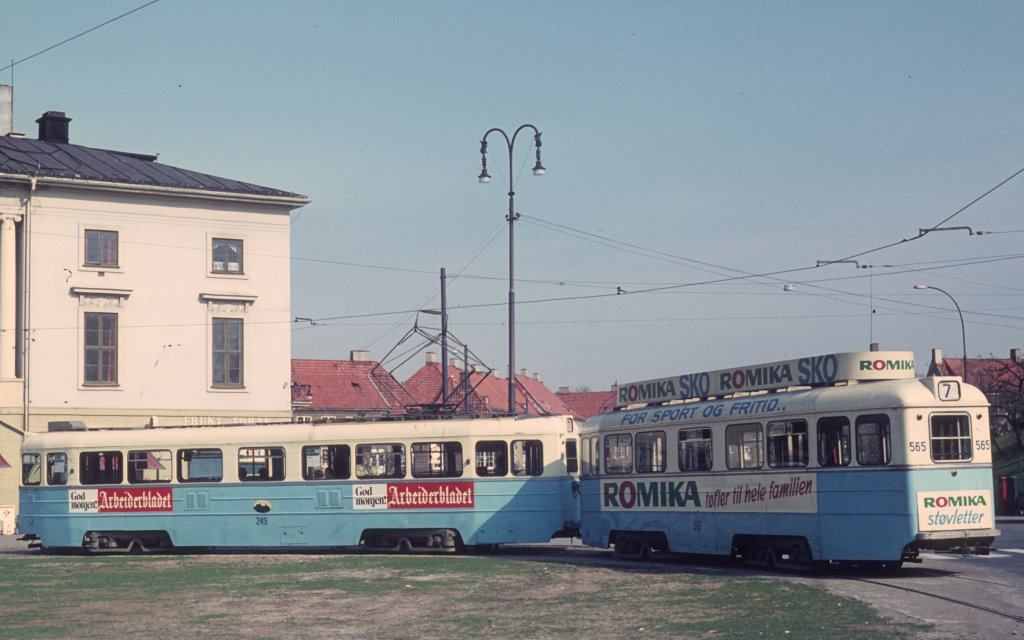
MBO tram and TO trailer at John Colletts plass in 1971.

The tender was issued in 1953 for twelve trams and thirty trailers. Høka and Hägglund won the bid. All motorized units would be manufactured by Høka, along with twelve trailers. The remaining eighteen trailers would be built by Strømmens Verksted, due to lack of capacity at Høka. Each trailer cost 190,000 kroner, while the motor units cost 317,500. The contract included an option for eight more motorized units—which was quickly redeemed. Deliveries started in 1956 and the first trailer was put into revenue service on 28 May and the trailer class designated TBO55. The motor units, designated MBO55, first entered service on 15 July 1957, for the opening of the Lambertseter Line. A second batch was delivered from May through December 1958 and was designated MBO56. The total value of the SM53 series trams was 30 million krone. A single Mustang B25 trailer was bought used from Stockholm in 1957, when the trams there were closed. The trailer had left-hand drive, but by simply running it "backwards" the doors were placed on the right side. It was numbered 581 and classified as STBO50.

MBO55 and -56 also had issues with the controllers and the lubrication of the gear boxes, and the issues were soon corrected. The most troubling issue was a swaying motion when running on the suburban Vignoles rails. The riders complained to no avail until several derailments made the management aware of the severity. A Gullfisk was test-run and found to have a much smoother ride. A horizontal suspension was added, which helped somewhat to reduce the swaying. This could only be installed on the newer MBO55 and -56 series, as MBO50 had a different bogie design. The issue was never corrected in a satisfactory way.

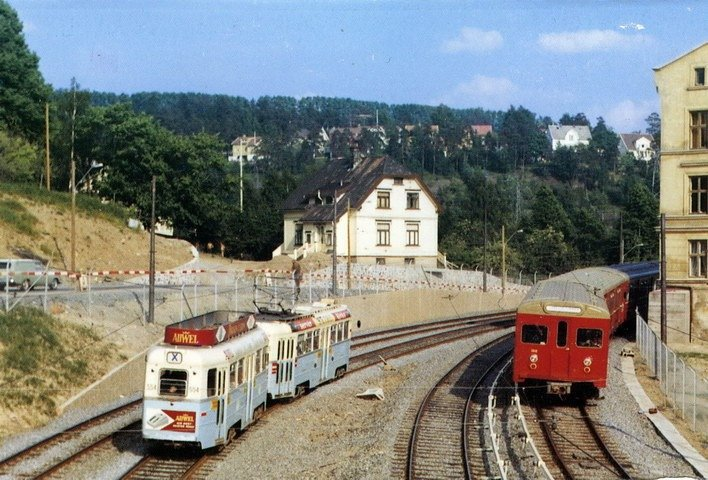
For a year between 1966 and 1967 the SM53 trams continued to run on the Østensjø Line (left), while the new T1000 trains of the Oslo Metro had taken over services on the Lambertseter Line.

=== Early career ===
With the second series delivered the SM53 units entered service on most of street tram lines. Two exceptions were the Kampen Line and the Vestbanen Line, both which were built for the older narrow profile and could not be used by the wider trams. As the trams were unidirectional they required a balloon loop at the ends of each line, which was also lacking on the Kampen Line, and new track arrangement had to be built at Vålerenga Depot and Majorstuen Depot. The issue was availed by the 1957 opening of Grefsen Depot, which was built for unidirectional trams. The MBO50 units were rebuilt in 1959, whereby the back door was closed and the received the same interior as the new trams, with single seats all the way along the door side.

The city council voted in 1960 to gradually close down the tramway and replace it with the metro and diesel buses. Operations could continue with the existing rolling stock, although all investments were halted. In the following eight years the least trafficked tram lines were closed. SM53 was most commonly used on lines 1, 2, 7 and 11 in this period, specifically serving the Briskeby Line, the Frogner Line, the Ullevål Hageby Line, the Sinsen Line, the Grünerløkka–Torshov Line and the Kjelsås Line, as well as the suburban lines. The Chickens were used on the Sagene Line. The last SM53 ran on the Lambertseter Line on 17 May 1966 and on the Østensjø Line 29 October 1967, as these were converted to metro lines. From then all SM53s were stalled at Grefsen.

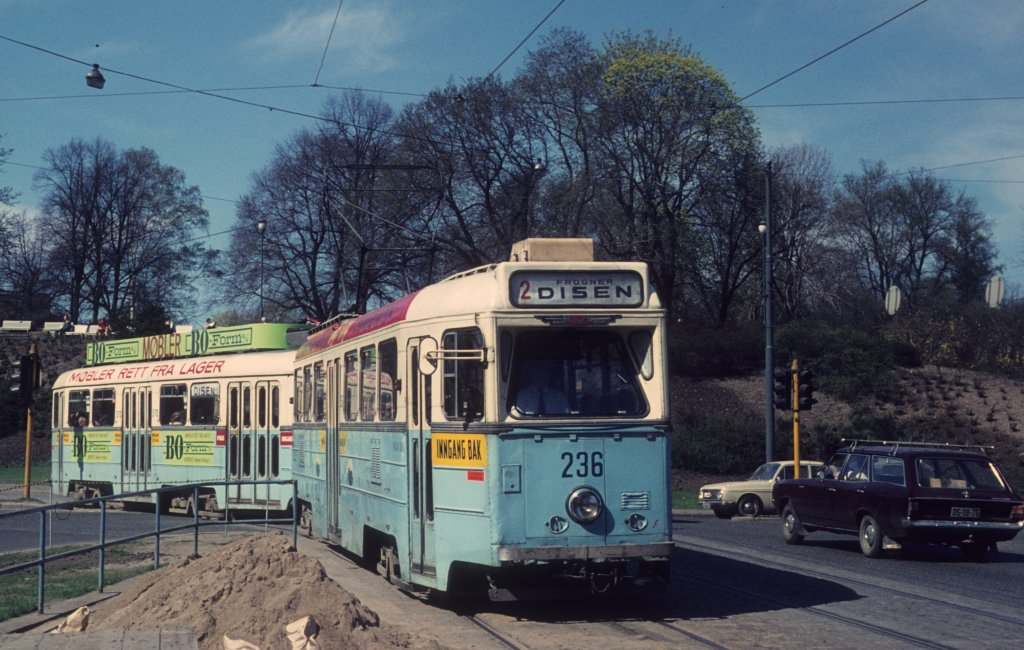
MBO 236 at Nationaltheatret in 1971

Oslo Sporveier's management attempted to close the tram operations during the late 1960s. However, the "Høka lines" 1, 2, 7 and 11 and the suburban Lilleaker Line and Ekeberg Line exceeded the combined traffic of all city buses. As long as the SM53 units were operational it would not pay to order 300 new buses needed to replace them. Oslo Sporveier carried out a large-scale retirement of older twin-axle trams during the late 1960s, particularly between 1966 and 1968. By then the only remaining trams were SM53 and the Gullfisk.

To cut costs, Oslo Sporveier considered during the late 1960s if it could introduce one-man operation and abolish the conductor during off-peak hours. This would require a redesign of the interior. Inspiration was gathered from the Hamburg Tramway and unit 206 was rebuilt in 1970. However, the labor unions were opposed to the change, fearing for their jobs, and succeeded at vetoing the change. From 1971 one-man operations were introduced by Bærumsbanen on their Gullfisk units, creating a certain precedence for future conversion. From 29 September 1974 the Lilleaker and Ekeberg Lines were combined as Line 9, and all available Gullfisk were moved there. Thus all street tram services were being served with SM53. However, there were soon a lack of Gullfisk, resulting in some of the Høka trams reentering service on the suburban lines.

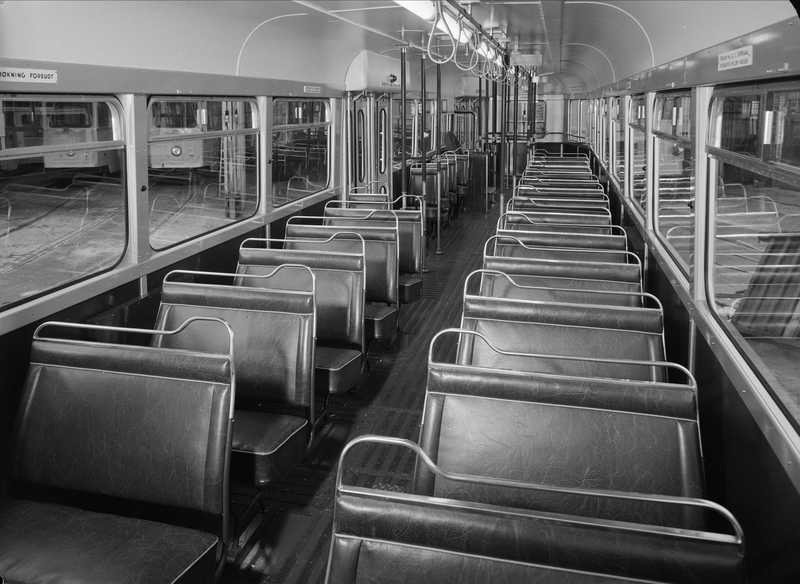
Original interior of an MBO unit

=== First retirements ===
The city council voted in February 1978 to not close the tramway and instead invest in new rolling stock. The first investment was three used M23 units from Gothenburg, which were technically nearly identical to SM53. Except for being underpowered, making them unsuitable for service on the Ekeberg Line, they worked well and Oslo Sporveier therefore decided to retire the Chickens and replace them with additional MBG and TBG trams and trailers. Four more such pairs were delivered in 1980. The first two Chickens were retired at the end of the 1980 and were chopped in October 1981. With the delivery of the twenty-five first SL79 trams in 1982, the remaining Chickens could be retired on 1 September. No. 38 was preserved by Oslo Tramway Museum, while the rest of the units were scrapped in the course of the month. This was the last twin-axled trams to run in revenue service in Oslo.

Services on Line 9 were taken over by SL79 and all SM53 units returned to street service. The future of the tramway was still largely based on it being able to reduce costs. The easiest way to rationalize was to introduce one-man operations. The first rebuilt SM53, no. 245, entered one-man service in 1982, and by 19 February 1983 all conductors had been removed. The labor unions agreed to the plan under condition that the motorman's cabins were rebuilt to a more ergonometric layout. Next the trailers were rebuilt to become unmanned. The first entered service on 22 April 1983, the last manned trailer, and thus last conductor on the tramway, ran on 8 June 1984. The MBG series became superfluous and four pairs were retired on 1 January 1984. The TO trailers were likewise retired between March 1984 and July 1985. The last three Gothenburg trailers were kept and rebuilt to run with SM53 trams and remained in service until 1989.

=== Modernization ===
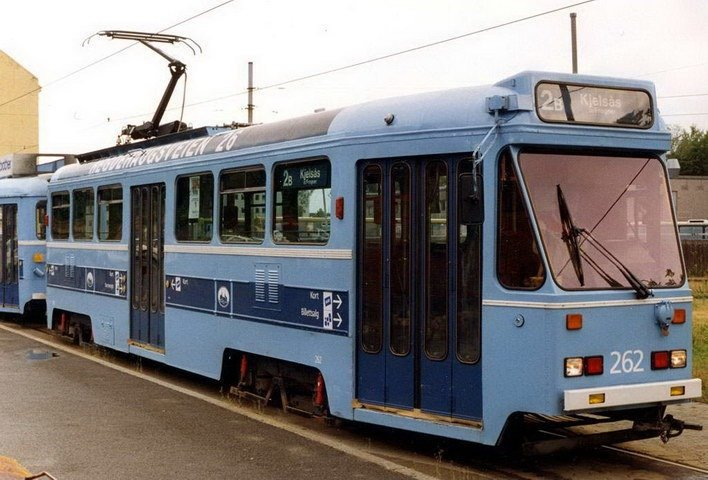
SM83 262 at Skøyen in 1992

In a move to retire the last Gullfisk before their next main revision, Oslo Sporveier rebuilt some of the SM53 units to allow them again to run on the suburban lines. This time vertical suspension was installed between the bogies and axle box, finally solving the issue with the swaying. Other improvements included a car horn, a new pantograph and dead man's control. This gave Oslo Sporveier 50 trams and 33 trailers—and too few of the latter. This resulted in seven used S27 trams being bought from Gothenburg and designated TBG and entering service between 27 November 1985 and 16 January 1986. They received a new interior between 1990 and 1993.

By the 1980s the SM53 units were out of date and were dire need of renewal. Oslo Sporveier therefore carried out a trial with no. 261, which was upgraded at Sagene and completed on 23 June 1985. Conversion took four months and eleven units were rebuilt until 1991. The work involved rebuilding the front, installation of new doors and interior, and a new chopper-based controller and new electronics. They were designated S83. Only one trailer were similarly rebuilt, and given the designation S86T. This proved to be expensive and gave little advantages and was not carried out on other units. However, smaller upgrades and new interiors were installed on 21 trailers in the same period.

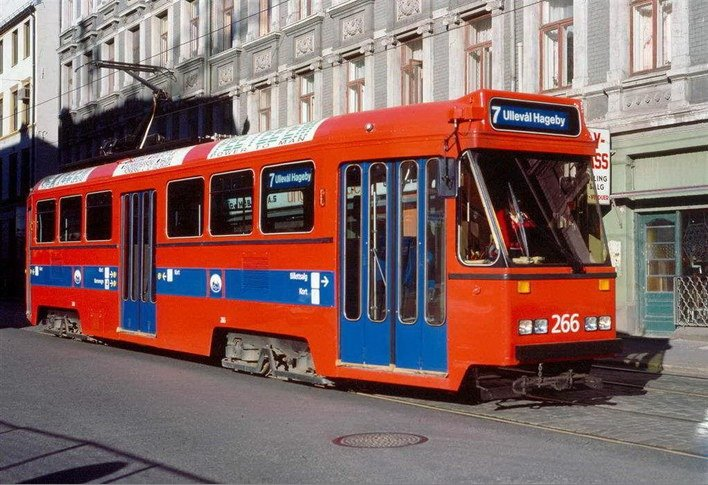
SM83 in red livery in 1987. Oslo Sporveier experimented with an intermodal all-red fleet, but was met by massive protests by the city's population.

During the 1980s Oslo Sporveier experimented with their livery. Some received a darker blue, either entirely or with a cream-colored upper section. Consultants had concluded that Oslo Sporveier should introduce a uniform red color with dark blue detailing on all modes of transport: buses, metro trains and trams. This went without protests on the other two modes, but when the trams were painted red it was met with a storm of protests and a unison public demanded that they retain their light blue color. This resulted in a new uniform light blue color scheme which was introduced on the SM83 units. Most of the SM53 retained their original colors.

=== Final years ===
The second batch of SL79 trams was delivered in 1989 and 1990, allowing the first SM53 units to be retired. Three, nos. 237, 244 and 253, were rebuilt to maintenance of way matériel and painted yellow. No. 245 was converted to a school tram. The main concern with the trams was that the insulation on the high-voltage wires was wearing off. They were placed in ducts which were also used for ventilation and heating, giving extra wear. As long as they were not touched the cables would remain intact. This was the start of the process of retiring the SM53 units.

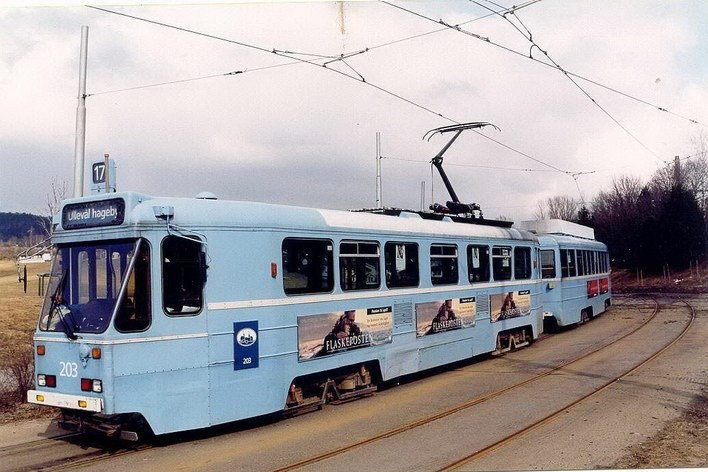
SM83 at Muselunden 1996, in its final color scheme

As part of construction work at Storo and Sinsen the tramway decided to lease used M25 trams from Gothenburg, designated SM91. These could be connected and run as bidirectional trams, avoiding temporary balloon loops. They proved to be in better condition than the SM53 units. The twenty original trams delivered from October 1991 to 1992 were supplemented a year later with fourteen additional units. This was thought to be sufficient to replace all the SM53 units. However, Oslo Sporveier soon realized that they needed more trams for an increase in services. In addition the SM91 units were troubled with technical faults. Still, the bulk of SM53 trams could be retired. No. 249 was sold to Stockholm for 1 krone, where it was designated Class A33 and numbered 700, and used on the heritage Djurgården Line. In 1993 and 1994 a further seventeen units were retired, including no. 215 and 234 which were deposited at the Oslo Tramway Museum. This brought the number of revenue Høka units to 28.

The type classifications were altered in 1992, and the trams renumbered in 1994. MBO50, -55 and -56 were all classified at SM53, S83 became SM83, TBO55 became ST55, S86T became ST86 and TBG became ST89. During the last years SM53s were only to be regularly used on Line 17, serving the Ullevål Hageby and Grünerløkka–Torshov Line. However, they were used throughout the network, in part because almost all motormen had its type certification, in part because SM91 could not enter service on the suburban lines. By 1997 a further set of trams were scrapped, with nine SM53 and ten ST55 units remaining. The 1995 ordering of new SL95 trams was planned as the coup de grâce for SM53.

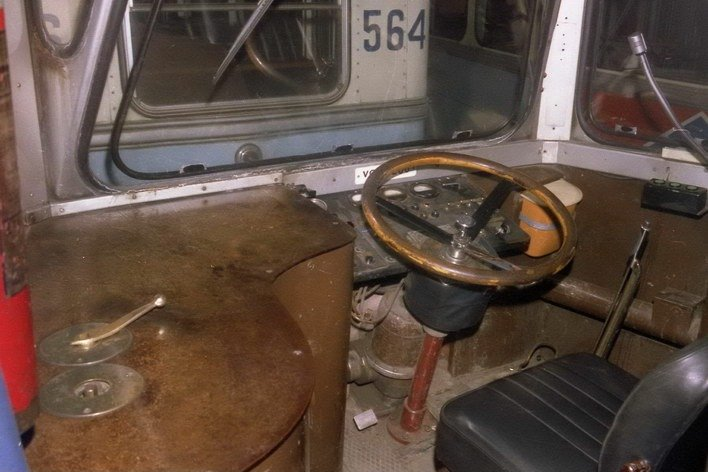
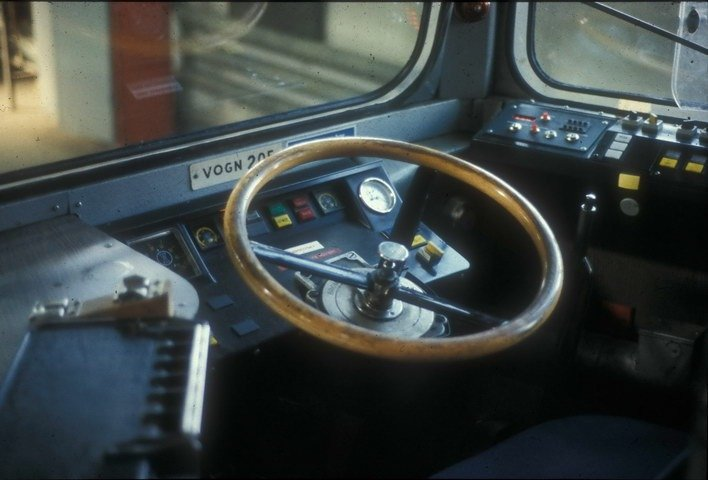
Comparison of original and rebuilt cabs

In 1997 the high-voltage cable issue was regarded as so severe that the company decided that they either would have to be replaced for the trams scrapped. On 12 September a tram lost its brakes and the following day all SM53 trams were taken out of service. Investigations showed that the braking systems would have to be rebuilt similar to SM83. This was too expensive and the trams never ran in revenue service again. One trailer received the new bogies for the SL95 and was hauled around Oslo by a SL79 for testing. The last of the non-preserved SM53s were scrapped in July 1998. Tram 259 was preserved as it was the only unit to have received a new cable. The only preserved trailer is no. 563, built by Strømmen.

The SM83, ST86 and ST89 were not subject to the cable and braking issue and were therefore kept in service. Originally Oslo ordered seventeen SL95s and planned to keep either the SM83 or the SM91 units. However, the options for another fifteen SL95s was redeemed, allowing all non-articulated trams to be retired. As the SL95 units were delivered, retirement of SM83 commenced in mid 1999. The choice to retire SM83 before SM91 was both that the former were in worse technical condition and that the need to raise the voltage on the tramway to 750 volts. SM91 had proven that it could adapt to such in Gothenburg, an outcome that the SM83 could not be sure of duplicating.

With the completion of the delivery of SL95 in 1999 and 2000 the SM83 units could be retired. No. 207 and 586 were preserved at the Oslo Tramway Museum and tram 210 was passed on to the Djurgården Line. Tram 201 and trailer 589 were sent to a heritage museum in Gothenburg and in the last minute tram 203 was issued to the Danish Tramway Museum. By March 2000 the plan was to have retired all the trams, but delays of the SL95 units caused the retirement date to be postponed to 3 June 2000. The following day the voltage was increased.

== Specifications ==
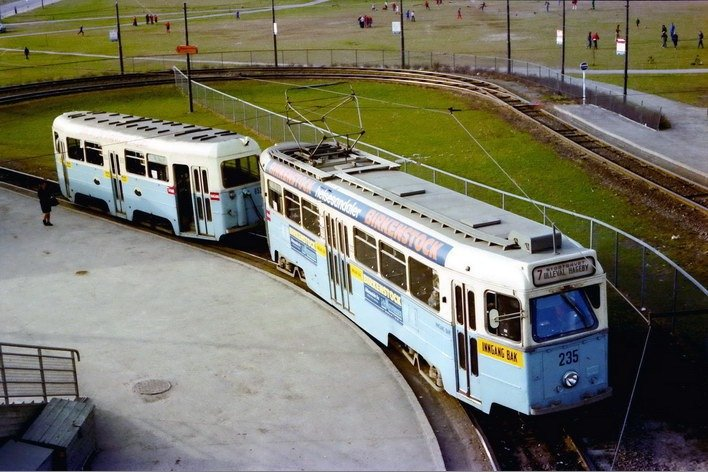
SM53 no. 235 at Muselunden in 1980

The trams each had four Hägglund MBL10 300-volt serial direct current electric motors. They were connected two and two in series to match the system's 600 volt power supply via the overhead wire. The motors were robust and caused very few technical faults. Each motor produced an output of 45.6 kilowatts (61.2 hp), which allowed for a maximum speed of 60 kilometers per hour (37 mph). A fully loaded tram and trailer could reach a speed of 40 kilometers per hour (25 mph) up the steepest hills. The MO (Chicken) units inherited Siemens D58wf motors with a power output of 42 kilowatts (56 hp).

The controller was a joint design by Allmänna Svenska Elektriska Aktiebolaget and Hägglund, designated CMBK4. It was equipped with four cylinders. Those controlling the speed and braking were connected to each other and the controlled by the motorman by a wheel. The cylinders controlling the direction and disconnection of the motors were controlled by a lever. They were connected such that the main cylinder and the speed/braking cylinders had to be set to zero to disconnect the motors or change direction. The speed/braking controller had 24 levels. The reason for introducing a wheel was to allow the driver to man it with either hand and give it a more ergonomic location, as the motormen's job was to a greater degree to manoeuver the tram in traffic rather than a more technical control of the vehicle. The trams were unidirectional, but to allow them to back there were controls at the back of the vehicles, hidden within a hatch. It had three buttions, controlling speed, braking and emergency braking.

The trams were equipped with two Hägglund-built H-bogies. They had an outer frame with the motor axles parallel with the wheel axles. Each axle had four rubber suspensions as its primary suspension. The carriage rested on the bogie on rubber plates. Later the bogies were supplemented with a shock absorber. The motors were connected to the wheel axles via a universal joint and a gear. The wheels were rubber suspended, but were later replaced with steel-suspended axle boxes which required less maintenance.

The trams had a primary dynamic braking controlled through 12 stages. There are also pneumatic drum brakes, although they are only used for parking, braking form the back end and for a passenger-induced emergency brake. The MO units were instead equipped with clasp brakes controlled by pneumatics. Trailers were equipped with solenoid brakes, but lacked a parking brake as it was found that the motor unit's holding brake was sufficient., In addition all units had an emergency rail brake. The trams were connected with Albert couplers.

The cars were built with welded, closed studding filled with wood. The roof had 1.5-millimeter (0.059 in) thick steel plates which were welded to the roof arches. The roof and studdings were all part of the carcass. The outside of the vehicles were clad with 1.25-millimeter (0.049 in) thick aluminum plates. Between there were placed 24 millimeters (0.94 in) of fire retardant insulation and then a layer of Insulitt, a layer of air and a new plate of Insulitt. The inside was clad in brown hardboard, with aluminum plats under the windows. The floor was a welded section of steel U-profiles, with a wooden floor covered with felt paper and linoleum. There were soon replaced with rubber flooring. The front of the vehicle had a steel plate which the controller to which the controller was fastened. This area doubled as a collision zone.

The units have four-abreast seating, with seats originally upholstered in dark blue leather. The interior was largely covered in aluminum and brown-painted plates. The window frames were covered in aluminum. The air ducts were at first painted brown, but passengers had a tendency to rest their feet on them. They were therefore kept unpainted. The motorman's cab was sealed off with an aluminum and plexiglas wall, later changed to a non-translucent aluminum to avoid reflections.

The trams were originally constructed with an entrance through the back door and exit through the middle and front doors. The conductor was seated at the back and the passengers would enter a platform before passing by the conductor. This was opposite on the trailers, which had the entrance at the front. This allowed for a common boarding area, which had the psychological effect of encouraging passengers to a greater extent board the trailer. The vehicles were equipped with blinker doors. MBO consisted of double doors at the front and back, and a single door in the middle. The first two TO units had the same design, while the remaining trailers had only single exit doors. The vehicles were not built with compartments.

Ventilation ducts ran through the gaps in the body and through the cable duct under the floor. They had openings in the floor and under the windows. The ventilation system doubled as cooling for the braking resistances. During cold weather the carriage air could be routed via the resistance to heat it, and warm and cold air could be mixed at various levels. As there was no resistance in the trailers, these were equipped with electric heaters. The trams had a 24-volt lighting system with cabin lighting from fluorescent lamps.

== Bibliography ==
- Andersen, Bjørn; Kjenstad, Rune (2000). Inngang bak (in Norwegian). Oslo: Forlaget Lokaltrafikk. ISBN 82-91223-02-5.
- Aspenberg, Nils Carl (1994). Trikker og forstadsbaner i Oslo (in Norwegian). Oslo: Baneforlaget. ISBN 82-91448-03-5.
