= SL X15p =

Swedish narrow gauge electric-multiple-unit local train made by Stadler

X15p
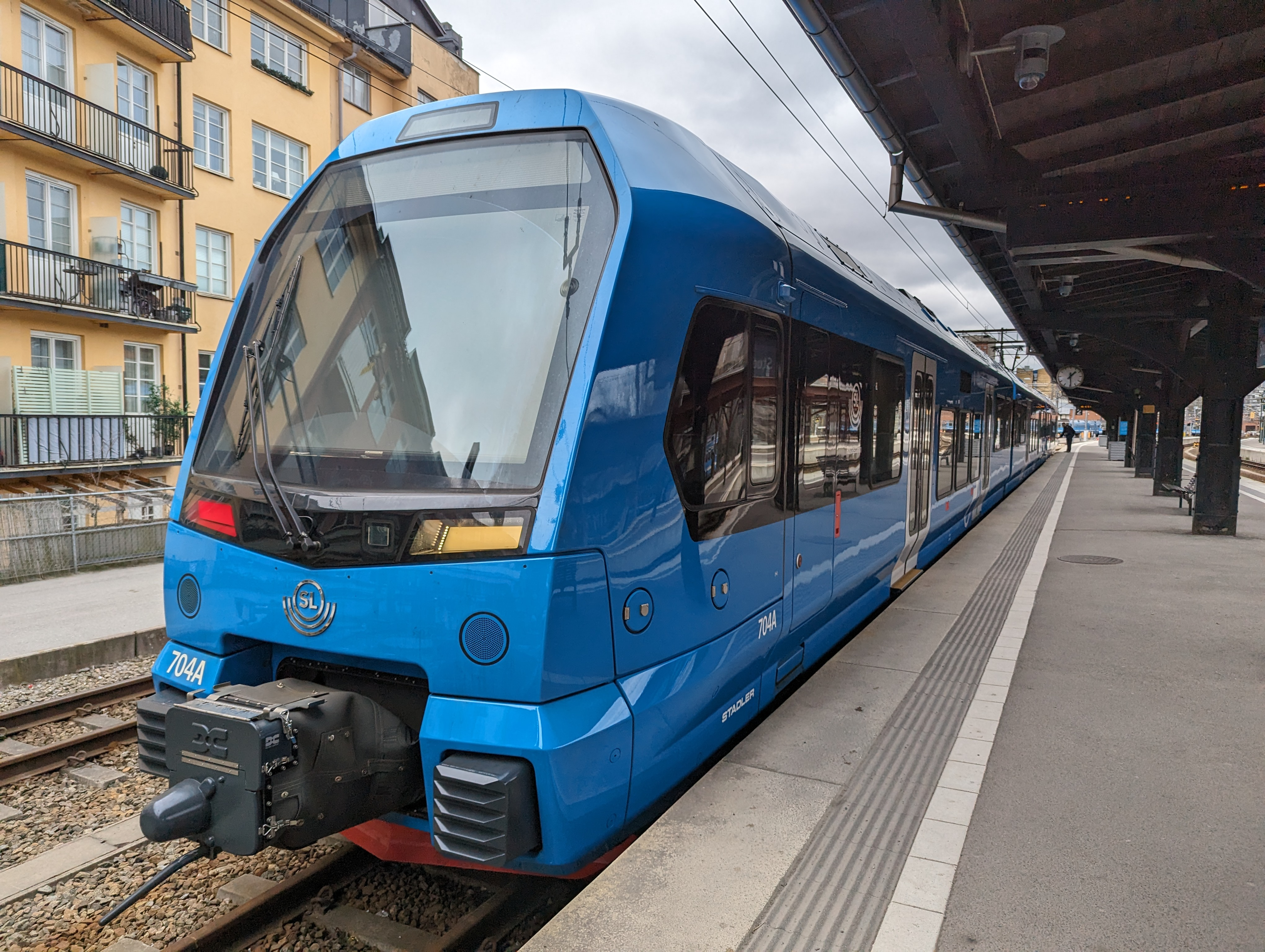
- SL X15p at Stockholms östra railway station in 2024
- Manufacturer: Stadler Rail
- Replaced: X10p/UBxp/UBp
- Constructed: 2017–
- Number under construction: 66 carriages (22 sets)
- Formation: 3-car sets (A-C-B)
- Fleet numbers: 701–722
- Capacity: 162 seats
- Operator: Transdev (under contract from Storstockholms Lokaltrafik)
- Depot: Vallentuna
- Line served: Roslagsbanan

Specifications
- Train length: 59.7 m (195 ft 10 in)
- Width: 2.75 m (9 ft 0 in)
- Height: 3.9 m (12 ft 10 in)
- Floor height: 665 mm (26.2 in)
- Doors: 2 / side / car
- Wheel diameter: 760 mm (30 in)
- Wheelbase: 2 m (6 ft 7 in)
- Maximum speed: 120 km/h (75 mph)
- Traction motors: 8 × TSA TMF 42-24-4 180 kW (240 hp)
- Power output: 1,440 kW (1,930 hp)
- Acceleration: 0.95 m/s^{2} (3.1 ft/s^{2})
- Electric systems: 1,500 V DC (nominal) from overhead catenary
- Current collection: Pantograph
- UIC classification: Bo′Bo′+2′2′+Bo′Bo′
- Coupling system: Dellner
- Track gauge: 891 mm (2 ft 11 3/32 in) Swedish three foot

X15p is a class of narrow gauge electric multiple units to be operated by SL on the Roslag Railway. 22 3-car sets will be delivered from 2020 to increase capacity on the network; the first of which were delivered in autumn 2020. Testing of the trains has been going on since then and the first train entered service on 31 October 2023. The name follows Swedish tradition for rail vehicle names, in which X means electric multiple unit, and the last p means 891 mm gauge.

A new depot, Vallentunadepån, has been constructed near Molnby, about 3,5 kilometers north of Vallentuna, in order to house the new trains. The depot contains space for all of the 22 new trains, with the ability to conduct maintenance on them as well. The older X10p rolling stock will still be housed at the depot in Mörby.
