= M29 (tram) =

Tram model in Gothenburg

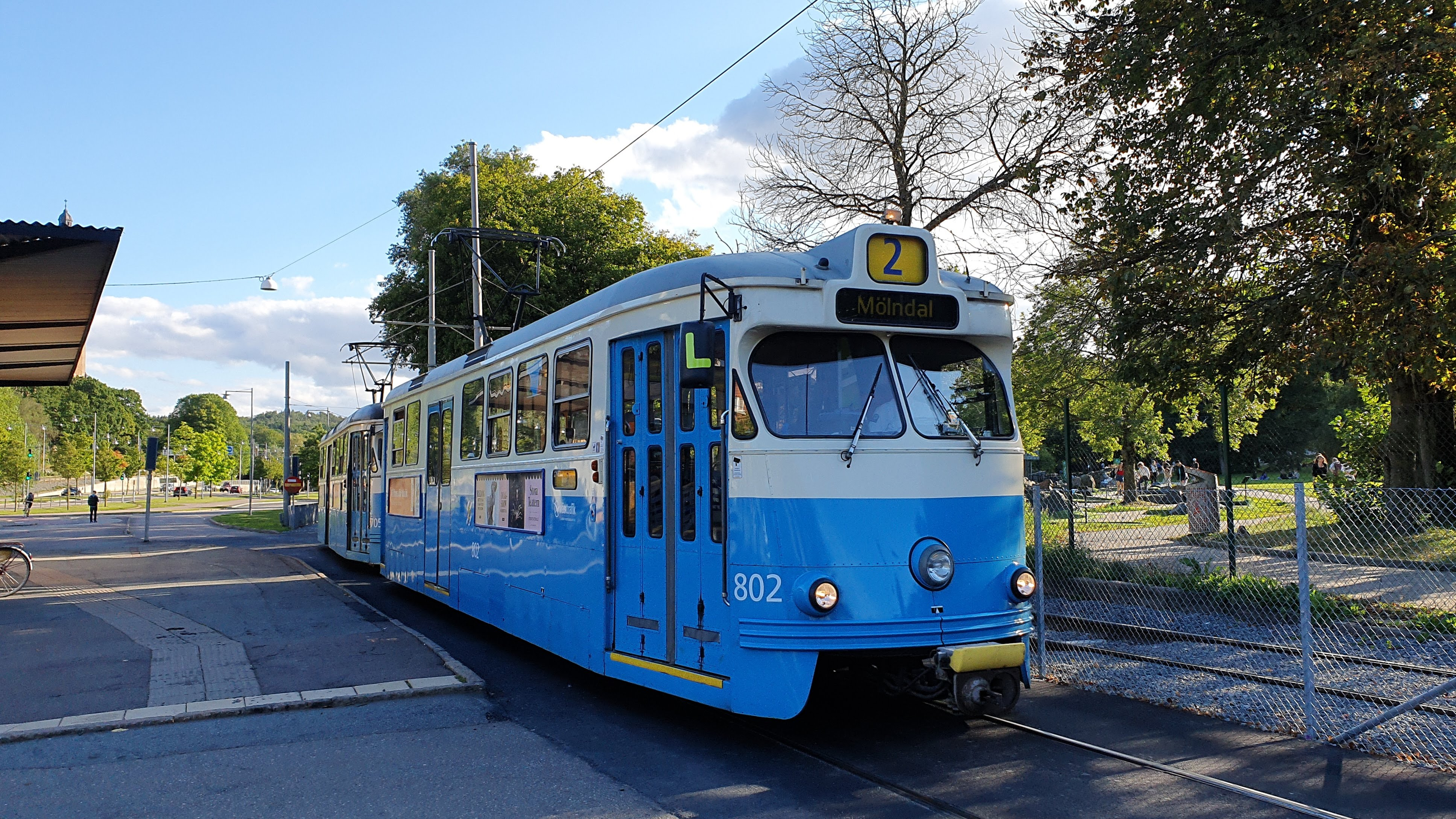
- M29 tram 802 in Gothenburg in 2021
- Manufacturer: Hägglund & Söner
- Capacity: 118
- Operators: Göteborgs Spårvägar

Specifications
- Car length: 14.16 metres (46 ft 5 in)
- Width: 2.65 metres (8 ft 8 in)
- Weight: 17 tonnes
- Electric system(s): 600 V DC overhead line
- Track gauge: 1,435 mm (4 ft 8 1/2 in)

The M29 is a class of 60 four-axle trams built for use on the Gothenburg Tramway in Sweden between 1969 and 1972. The class is still in passenger service in its home city and carries fleet numbers 801–860, although some members have been withdrawn.

The M29 was one of three similar classes, along with the M25 and M28 classes. All three classes were of similar exterior design, and any combination of them could be operated together in multiple unit with any vehicle leading.

== Specifications ==
The M29 Class was built by Hägglund & Söner as 60 single-car trams from 1969 to 1972. The standard gauge trams are 15.132 metres (49 ft 7.7 in) long, 2.650 metres (8 ft 8.3 in) wide and weigh 17.000 tonnes (16.7 long tons; 18.7 short tons). They are equipped with two bogies, each with two axles, giving a Bo'Bo' wheel arrangement. The axle distance is 1.800 metres (5 ft 10.9 in), the bogie-centre distance is 7.000 metres (22 ft 11.6 in) and the wheel diameter is 680 millimetres (2 ft 3 in).

Each tram has four motors totalling 200 kilowatts (270 hp) in power output, giving a maximum speed of 60 kilometres per hour (37 mph). The trams seat 36 people and stand 82 more. The cars are all single-ended (with a single driving cab) and single-sided (with passenger doors only on one side). All cars were built for operation in right-hand traffic, with doors on the right facing the drivers cab.

== History ==
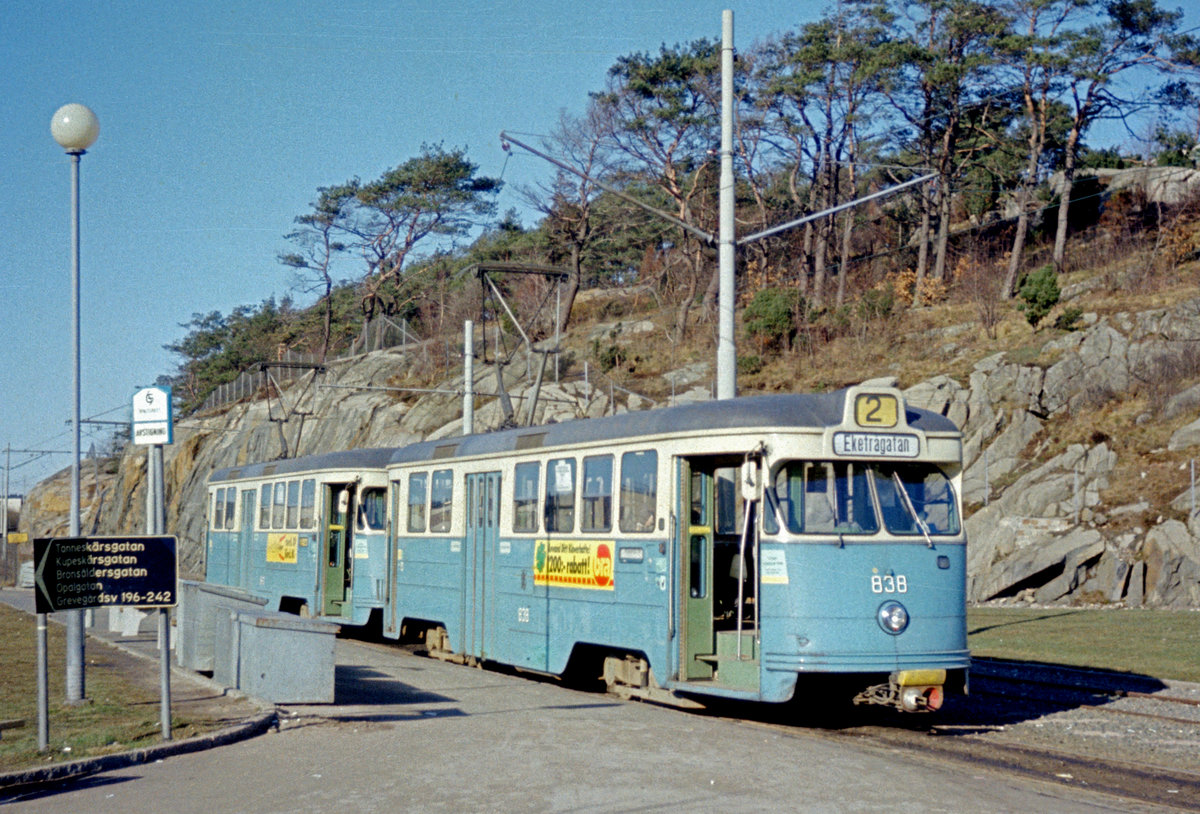
Tram M29 838 in service in 1975.

Between 1958 and 1962, Göteborgs Spårvägar put into service 125 trams of class M25, which were built for left-hand traffic, but less than a year later Sweden decided to change from left to right-side driving. Faced with the need to re-equip with trams suitable for right-hand traffic, the tram company ordered an additional 70 trams in the M28 series, and subsequently the 60 M29 trams. Both series were built for operation in right-hand traffic.

The M29s were delivered after the change of traffic, and typically operated in coupled pairs with a leading M29 and a trailing M28, or as single cars on less busy routes, but other combinations were possible and sometimes seen. Retirement of the M25 (1994) and M28 (2021) means that the only coupled pairs now seen are M29+M29.

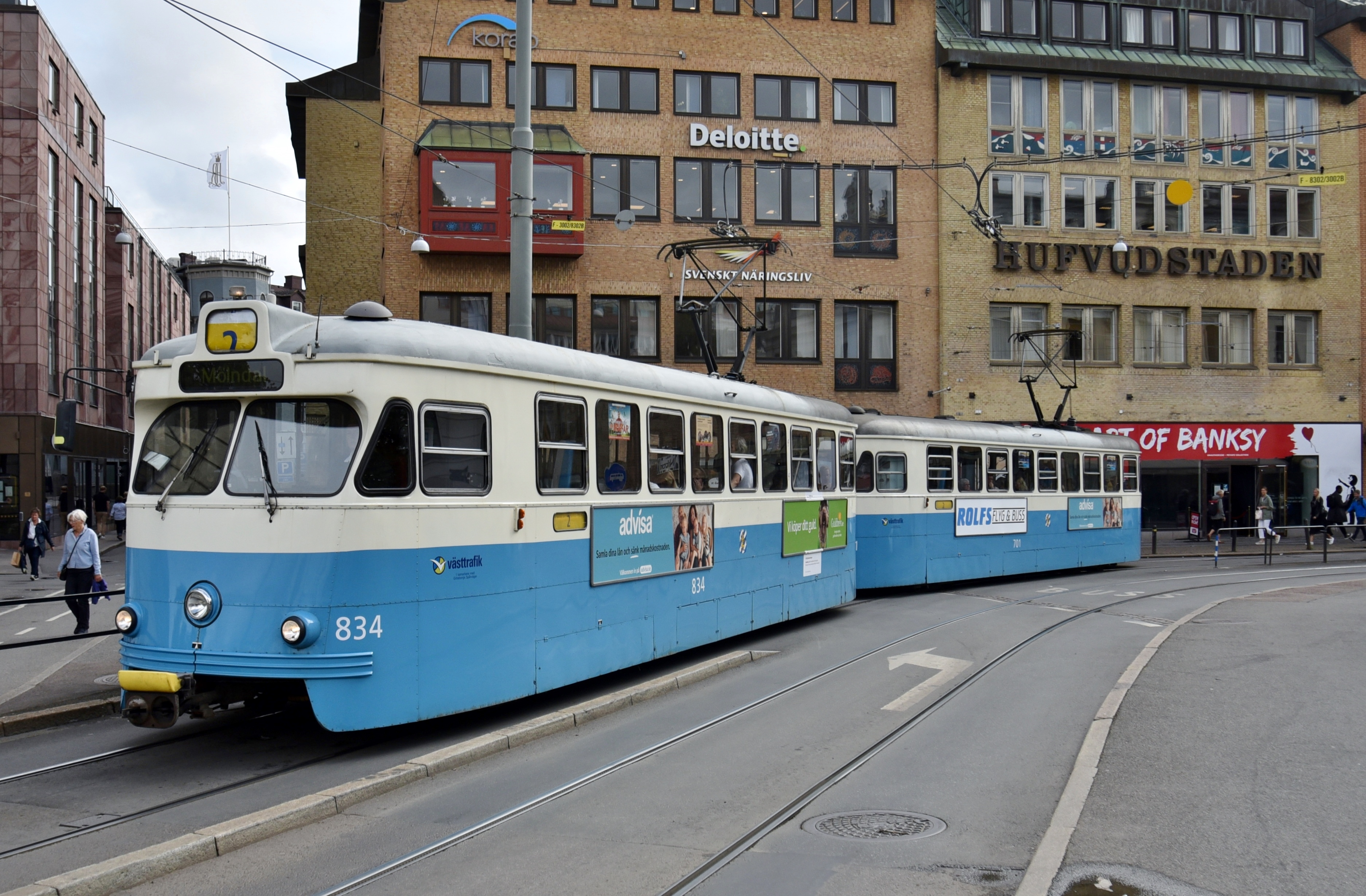
M29 834 leads M28 701. Comparison of this 2019 image with the previous one shows some of the changes made.

Since their introduction, the M29s have been rebuilt and modernized several times. The most obvious change is the introduction of skirts over the bogies, which that were added to reduce noise and potential for accidents. The wagons have also been the subject of a few different alternative colour schemes, both inside and out, and the exterior lights and displays have been replaced. In 2010, an interior information display was added, showing the line number, destination and next stop and complementing the automatic stop announcement.

The tram is still in service, although a number have been scrapped after accidents or fires. It was intended that it would be replaced by the M32, a variant of the AnsaldoBreda Sirio delivered between 2005 and 2013, but problems with those trams led to the M29 being retained. The current plan is that the M34, a variant of the Alstom Flexity Classic, will replace the M29, which will remain in service until 2026. In the meantime the trams are receiving targeted repairs and major maintenance of electrical and air systems.

In March 2026, it was announced that Gothenburg Tramway would donate trams to the Ukrainian city of Mykolaiv, whose infrastructure was damaged during Russia's invasion of Ukraine. A total of 40 trams are planned to be donated between 2026 and the end of 2027/2028.

== Influence elsewhere ==
In 1972, Hägglunds & Söner sold the drawings for the M29 tram to the Australian company Comeng, who were searching for designs for new trams for the Melbourne tram network. In the end, Comeng decided to create their own design for the new Z1 trams, but this was at least partly based on the M29 design, and used bogies designed by Hägglunds.
