= M28 (tram) =

Tram model in Gothenburg

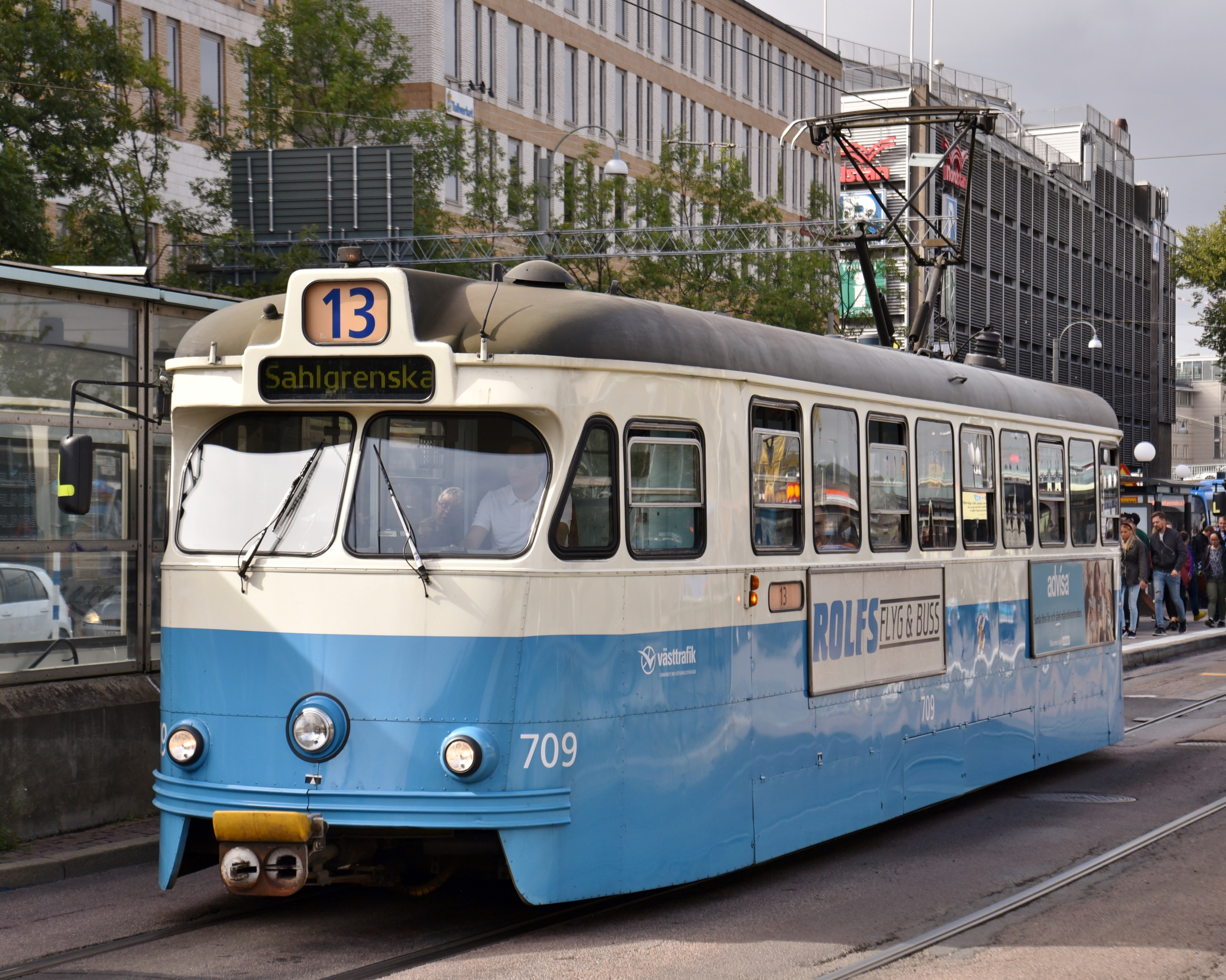
- M28 tram 709 in Gothenburg in 2019
- Manufacturer: ASEA and ASJ
- Capacity: 116
- Operators: Göteborgs Spårvägar

Specifications
- Car length: 14.16 metres (46 ft 5 in)
- Width: 2.65 metres (8 ft 8 in)
- Weight: 17 tonnes
- Electric system(s): 600 V DC overhead line
- Track gauge: 1,435 mm (4 ft 8 1/2 in)

The M28 was a class of 70 four-axle trams built for use on the Gothenburg Tramway in Sweden between 1965 and 1967. The class carries fleet numbers 701-770, and was withdrawn from service in 2021.

The M28 was one of three similar classes, along with the M25 and M29 classes. All three classes were of similar exterior design, and any combination of them could be operated together in multiple unit with any vehicle leading.

== Specifications ==
The M28 Class was built by ASEA and ASJ as 70 single-car trams from 1969 to 1972. The standard gauge trams are 15.132 metres (49 ft 7.7 in) long, 2.650 metres (8 ft 8.3 in) wide and weigh 16.800 tonnes (16.5 long tons; 18.5 short tons). They are equipped with two bogies, each with two axles, giving a Bo'Bo' wheel arrangement. The axle distance is 1.800 metres (5 ft 10.9 in), the bogie-centre distance is 7.000 metres (22 ft 11.6 in) and the wheel diameter is 680 millimetres (2 ft 3 in).

Each tram has four motors totalling 176 kilowatts (236 hp) in power output, giving a maximum speed of 60 kilometres per hour (37 mph). The trams seat 38 people and stand 78 more. The cars are all single-ended (with a single driving cab) and single-sided (with passenger doors only on one side). All cars were built for operation in right-hand traffic, with doors on the right facing the drivers cab.

== History ==
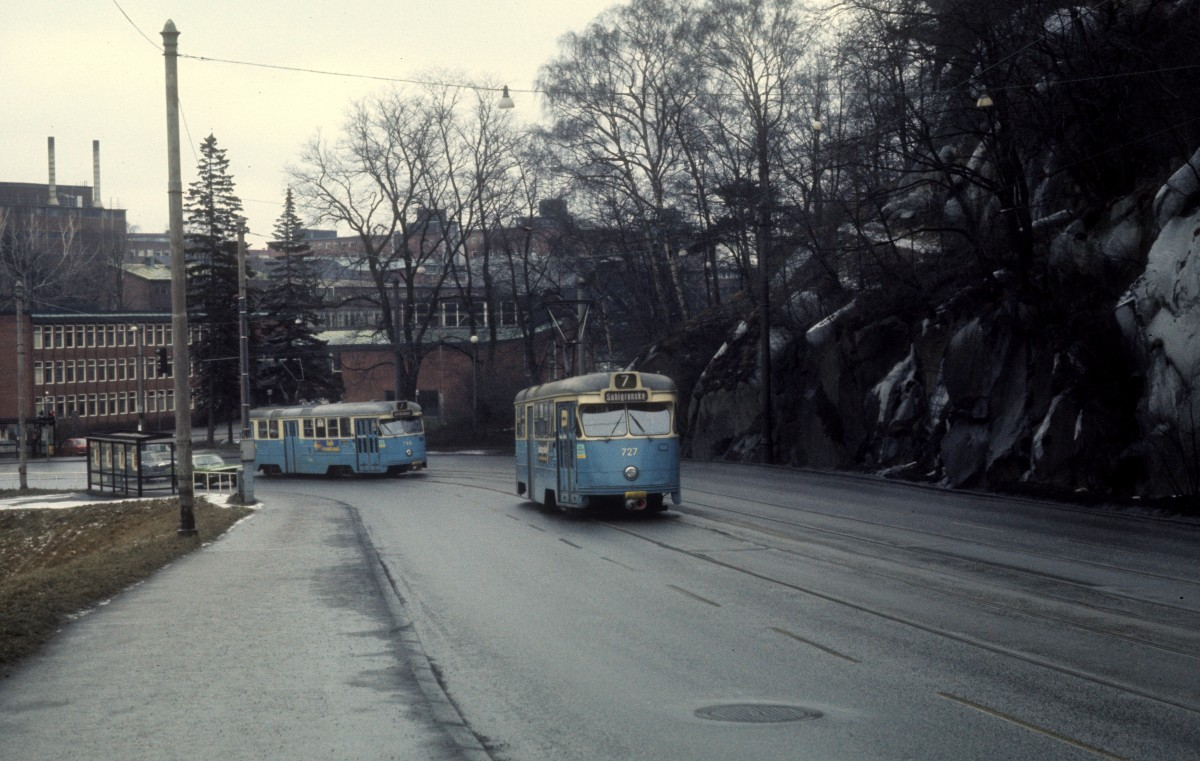
Tram M28 727 and M28 749 in 1975

Between 1958 and 1962, Göteborgs Spårvägar put into service 125 trams of class M25, which were built for left-hand traffic, but less than a year later Sweden decided to change from left to right-side driving. Faced with the need to re-equip with trams suitable for right-hand traffic, the tram company ordered an additional 70 trams in the M28 series, and subsequently the 60 M29 trams. Both series were built for operation in right-hand traffic.

The M28s were delivered before Dagen H (3 September 1967; the date the change was made) and were first placed into service coupled back-to-back to an M25 car, thus creating a double-ended but single-sided coupled-pair. Before the change these car-pairs were driven with the M25 leading, after the change the M28 led. In later years they typically operated in coupled pairs with a leading M29 and a trailing M28, or as single cars on less busy routes, but other combinations were sometimes seen.

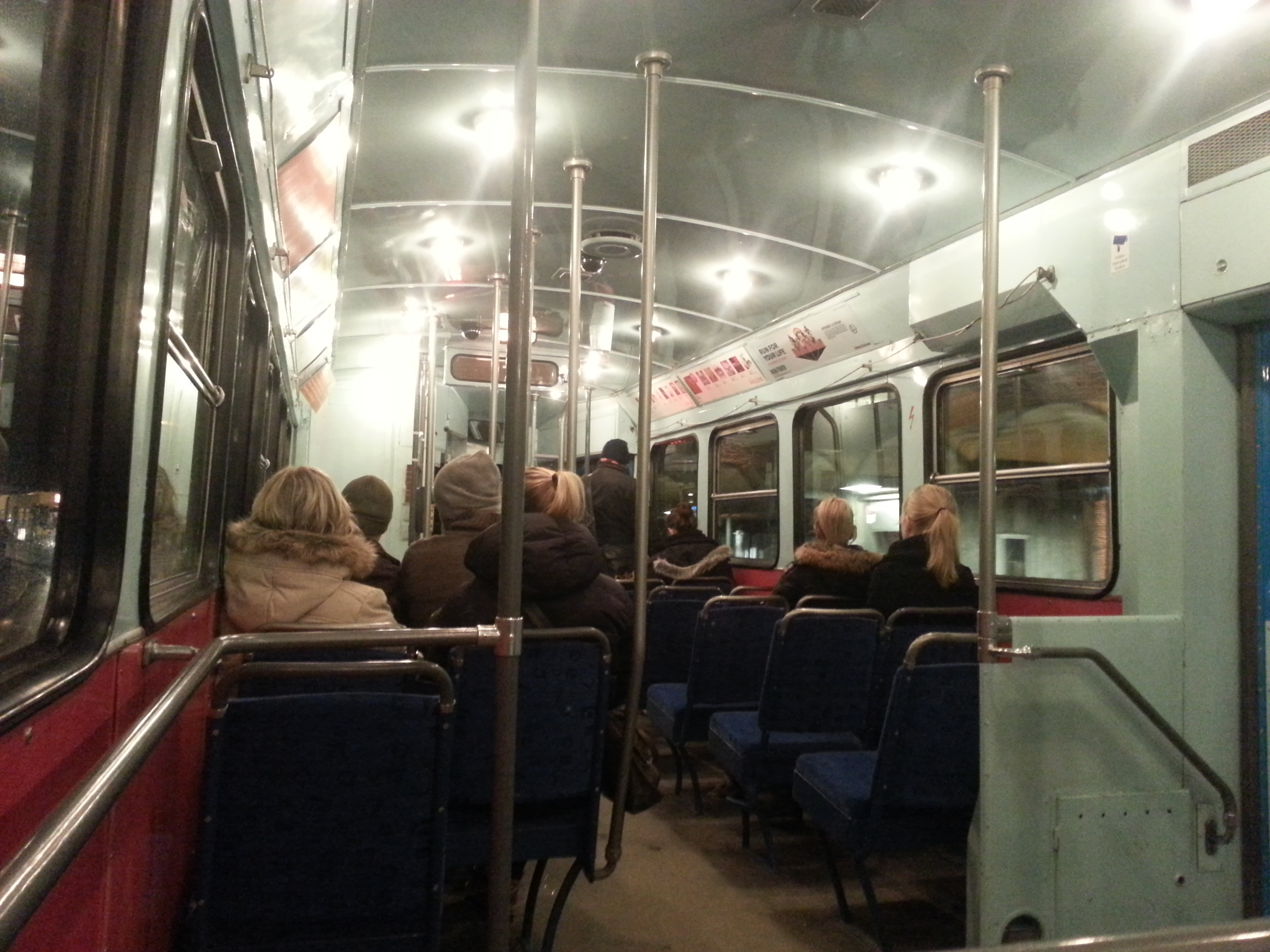
The interior of M28 708 in 2013

After their introduction, the M28s were rebuilt and modernized several times. The most obvious change was the introduction of skirts over the bogies, which that were added to reduce noise and potential for accidents. The wagons were also the subject of a few different alternative colour schemes, both inside and out, and the exterior lights and displays were replaced. In 2010, an interior information display was added, showing the line number, destination and next stop and complementing the automatic stop announcement.

It was intended that the M28 and M29 classes would both be replaced by the M32, a variant of the AnsaldoBreda Sirio delivered between 2005 and 2013, but problems with those trams led to both classes being retained. Subsequently the plan was to replace the M28 trams with the M33, a variant of the Alstom Flexity Classic, but before the completion of the delivery of that class, it was decided to take the M28s out of service for safety reasons. The last M28 ran in service on 28 October 2021, with the sudden withdrawal having an impact on tram availability.

== M28 in preservation ==
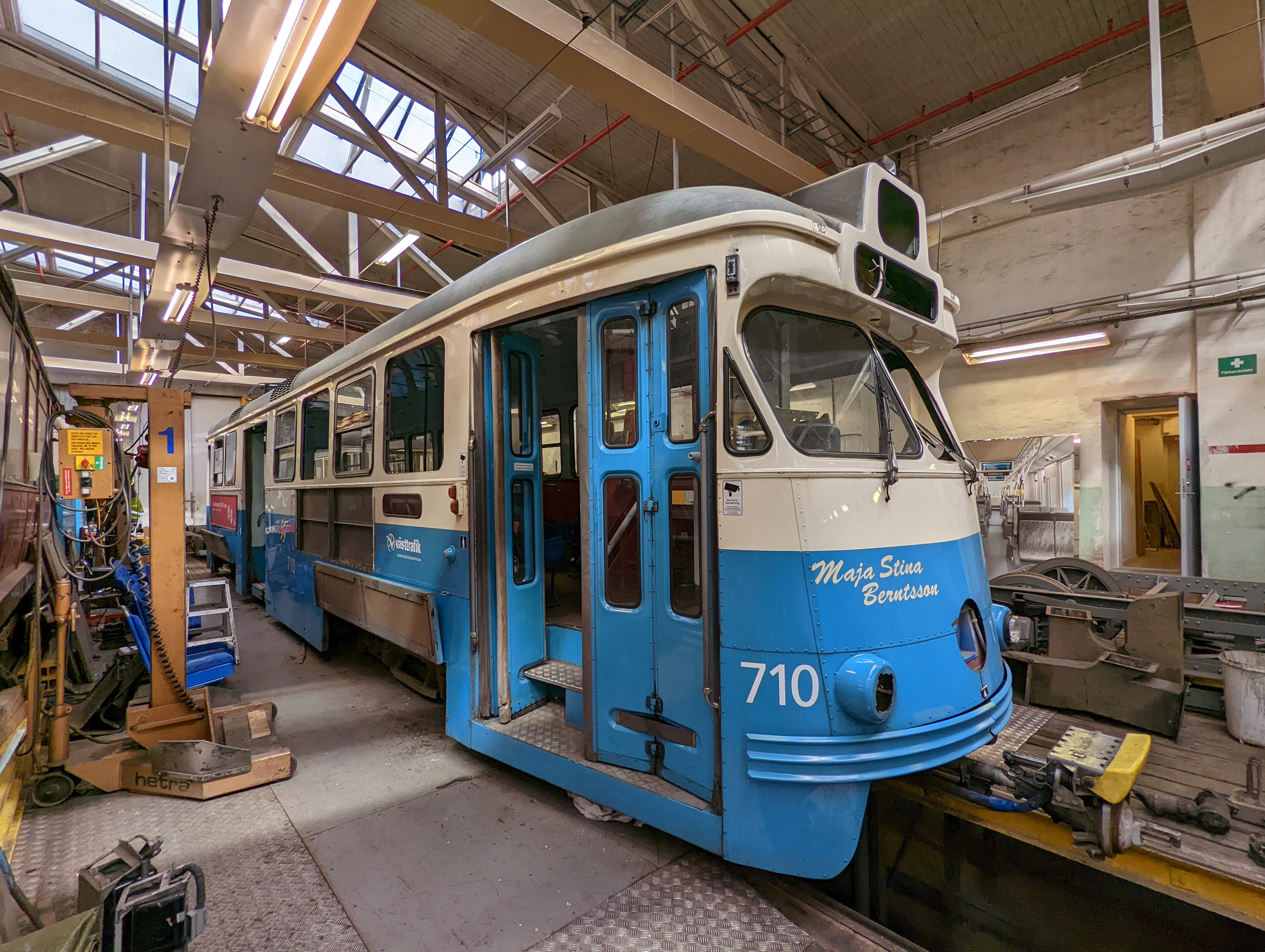
Tram M28 710 being dismantled to provide spare parts for the preserved trams

Three members of the M28 class still exist in preservation:

Number	Location	Notes	Image
755	Gårdahallen, Gothenburg	Owned by the Ringlinien Tramway Society and undergoing restoration. To be restored to its condition as withdrawn in 2021.	
768	Samskolan, Gothenburg	Statically preserved in the school yard, where it is in use as a classroom, break room and meeting room. This usage was suggested by a former pupil, whose grandfather worked on the design of the class.	
770	Gårdahallen, Gothenburg	Owned by the Ringlinien Tramway Society and undergoing restoration. To be restored to its condition as introduced in 1967.	
