= SL X10p =

X10p
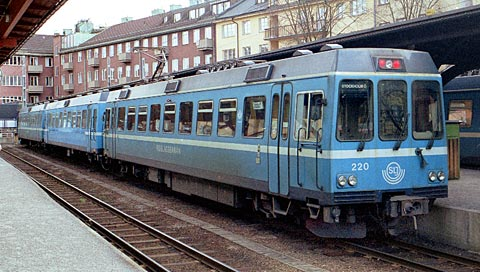
- An unrefurbished X10p train at Stockholms östra railway station in January 2007

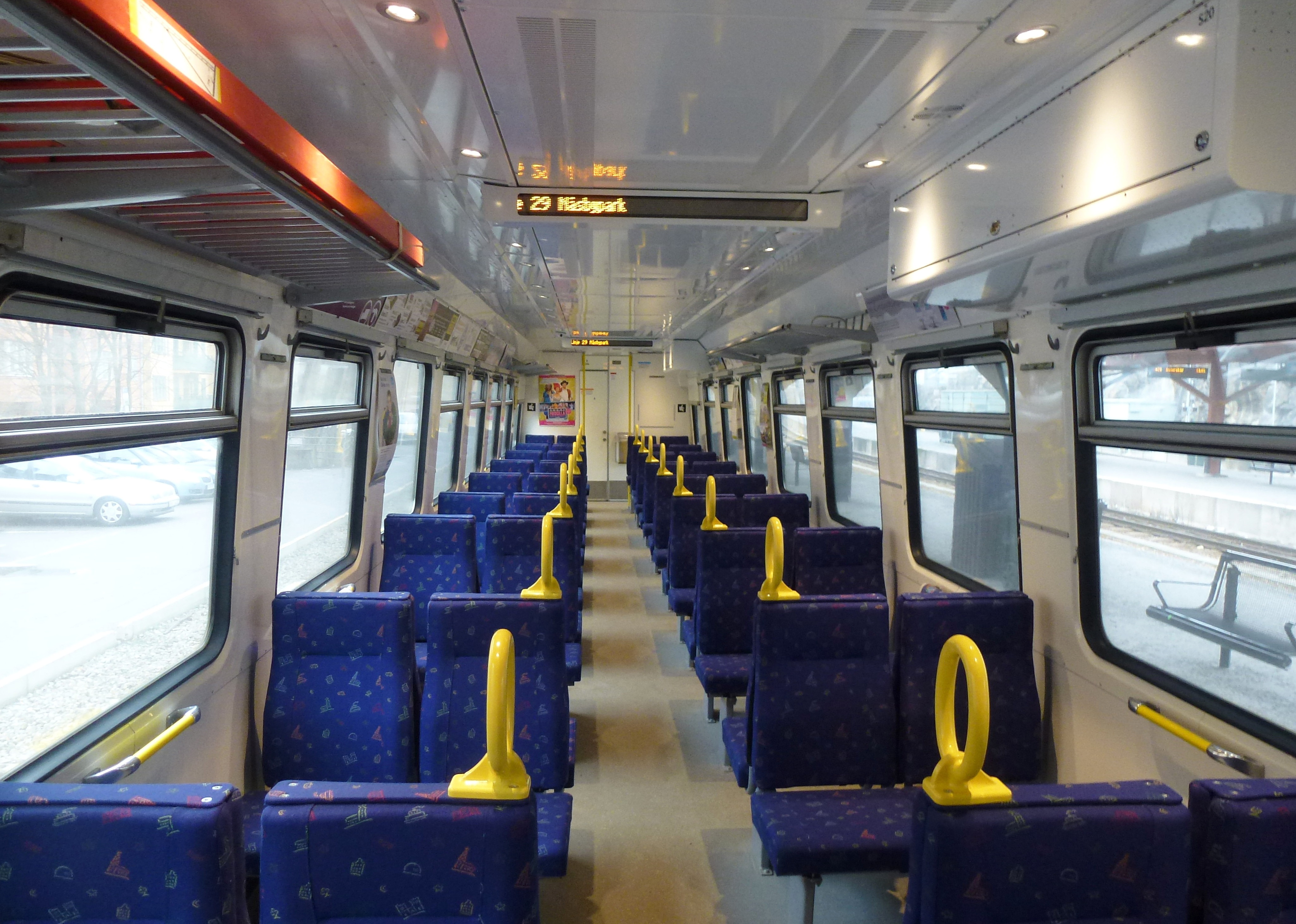
- Interior of a refurbished X10p carriage
- In service: 1990–present
- Manufacturers: ABB, Adtranz, Hägglund & Söner
- Built at: Örnsköldsvik
- Constructed: 1988–1995
- Refurbished: 2011–2013 at Euromaint Solna
- Number built: 35
- Successor: X15p
- Formation: X10p+UBp+UBxp
- Fleet numbers: 201–235
- Capacity: 232
- Operator: Transdev (under contract from Storstockholms Lokaltrafik)
- Depots: Mörby, Stockholm Ö
- Line served: Roslagsbanan

Specifications
- Car length: 19.9 m (65 ft 3 1/2 in)
- Width: 2.6 m (8 ft 6 3/8 in)
- Maximum speed: 80 km/h (50 mph)
- Weight: 26.6 t (26.2 long tons; 29.3 short tons)
- Power output: 400 kW (540 hp)
- Tractive effort: 90 kN (20,000 lbf)
- Electric systems: 1,500 V DC (nominal) from overhead catenary
- Current collection: Pantograph
- Track gauge: 891 mm (2 ft 11 3/32 in) Swedish three foot

X10p is a series of three-car electric multiple units operated by Greater Stockholm Transport (SL) on the Stockholm urban rail network called Roslagsbanan. The 891 mm (2 ft 11 3/32 in) gauged line cannot use the standard gauge rolling stock used in the rest of Stockholm, so SL ordered 35 new units to replace much older stock. Since 1995 X10p has been the sole stock used on Roslagsbanan.

All X10p trains received a mid-life refurbishment by Euromaint in Solna between 2011 and 2013, and they will be complemented with newer Stadler Rail X15p trains starting from 2022.
