= Hägglund & Söner =

Former Swedish engineering company

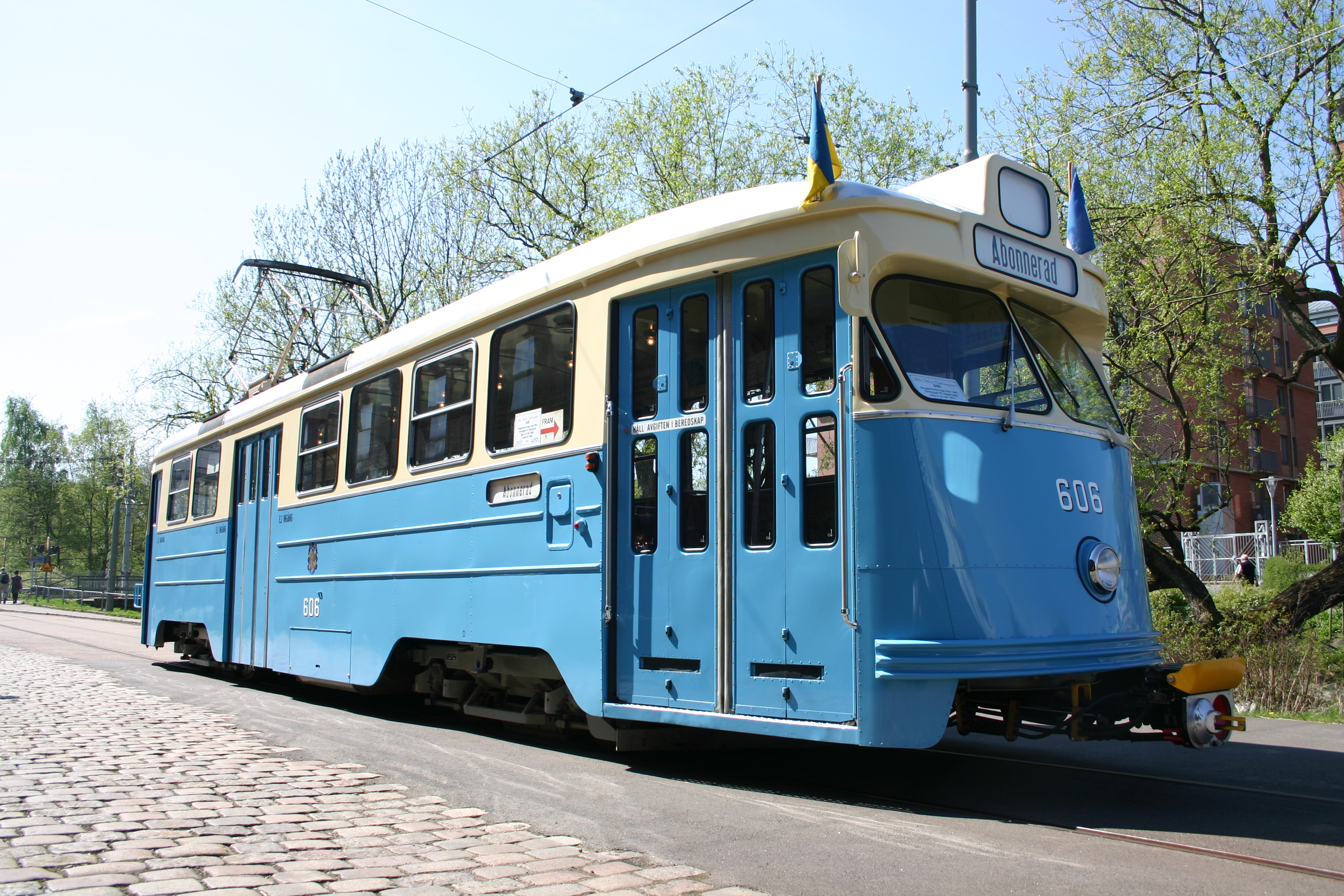
- An M25 tram built by Hägglund & Söner for Göteborg in 1961
- Industry: Engineering
- Founded: 1898
- Defunct: 1993
- Successor: Various (see article)
- Headquarters: Örnsköldsvik, Sweden

Hägglund & Söner (Hägglund & Sons), commonly known as Hägglunds, was a diversified engineering company based in the town of Örnsköldsvik, in Västernorrland, Sweden. Originally a furniture manufacturing company, it diversified into the construction of buses, railway rolling stock, airplanes, hydraulic motors, military vehicles, cranes and mining machinery.

== History ==
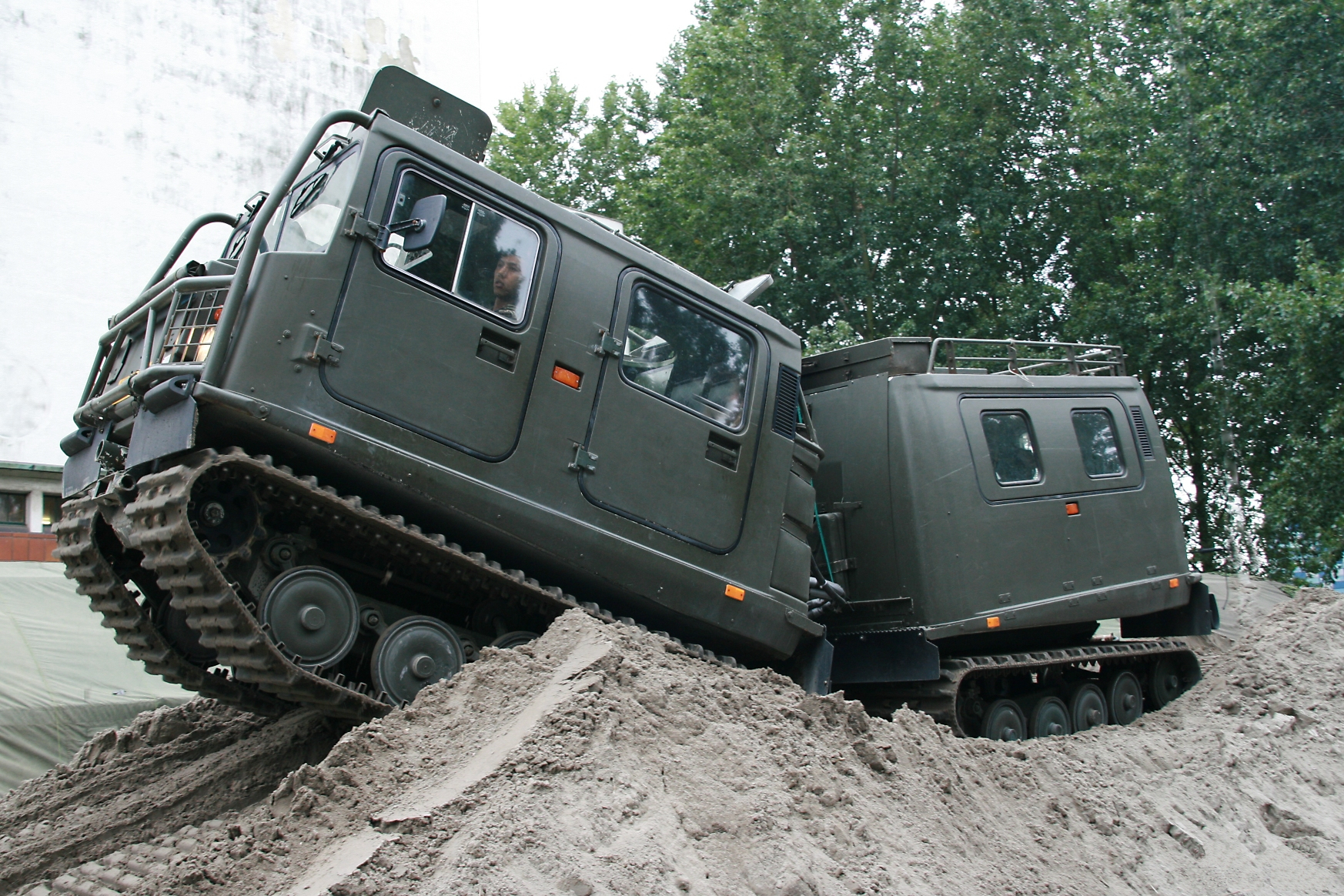
A BV-206 all-terrain vehicle, designed by Hägglund & Söner in the 1970s

The company was founded by the furniture maker Johan Hägglund in 1898.

In 1972, the Hägglund family sold the company to ASEA, another former Swedish engineering company. The Hägglund & Söner company was wound up in 1993, but many of the company's businesses still survive, in varied ownership:

- The rolling stock business remained within the ASEA group, and with subsequent mergers became in turn part of ABB, Adtranz, Bombardier Transportation and now Alstom.
- The crane business was sold to MacGregor in 1993 and is now owned by Cargotec.
- The military vehicles business was sold to Alvis plc in 1997, and was acquired by BAE Systems in 2004, operating as the BAE Systems Hägglunds subsidiary.
- The hydraulic motor business was sold to Atle AB, was owned for several years by Ratos and was bought by Bosch in 2011, operating as part of the Bosch Rexroth subsidiary and retaining the original name in its Hägglunds product range.

BAE Systems Hägglunds, Bosch Rexroth and Cargotec all maintain manufacturing facilities in Örnsköldsvik. BAE Systems Hägglunds and Bosch Rexroth jointly sponsor the Hägglunds Arena, a sporting arena in the town.

== Products ==
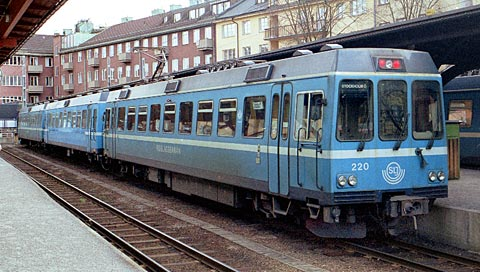
An X10p narrow-gauge electric train built for use in Stockholm in the late 1980s

The Hägglund & Söner company designed and built a wide range of products, including:

- the Bü 181, a two-seat airplane built under license between 1943 and 1945
- the BV-206, an all-terrain vehicle introduced in 1976 and used by military forces and civilian organisation around the world.
- the CV90, a family of armoured combat vehicles designed during the mid-1980s to early 1990s and used by a number of countries.
- the Hägglunds Drive System, a range of hydraulic motors.
- the Ikv 91, a high mobility assault gun built for the Swedish Army between 1969 and 1978.
- the M25 or SM91, a class of tram used in both Gothenburg and Oslo between 1958 and 2002.
- the M29, a class of tram used in Gothenburg since 1969.
- the Pbv 302, an armoured infantry fighting vehicle used by the Swedish Army from 1966 to 2014.
- the SM53, a class of tram used in Oslo between 1952 and 1997.
- the X10p, a class of electric train used on the narrow-gauge Roslagsbanan commuter railway in Stockholm since 1988.
- the Y6, a class of diesel railcar introduced in 1953, and used in Sweden, Norway and Denmark.

Other products were created using the Hägglunds name by successor organisations, but are not listed here.
