= M25 (tram) =

Tram model in Gothenburg, later sold to Oslo

M25 / SM91
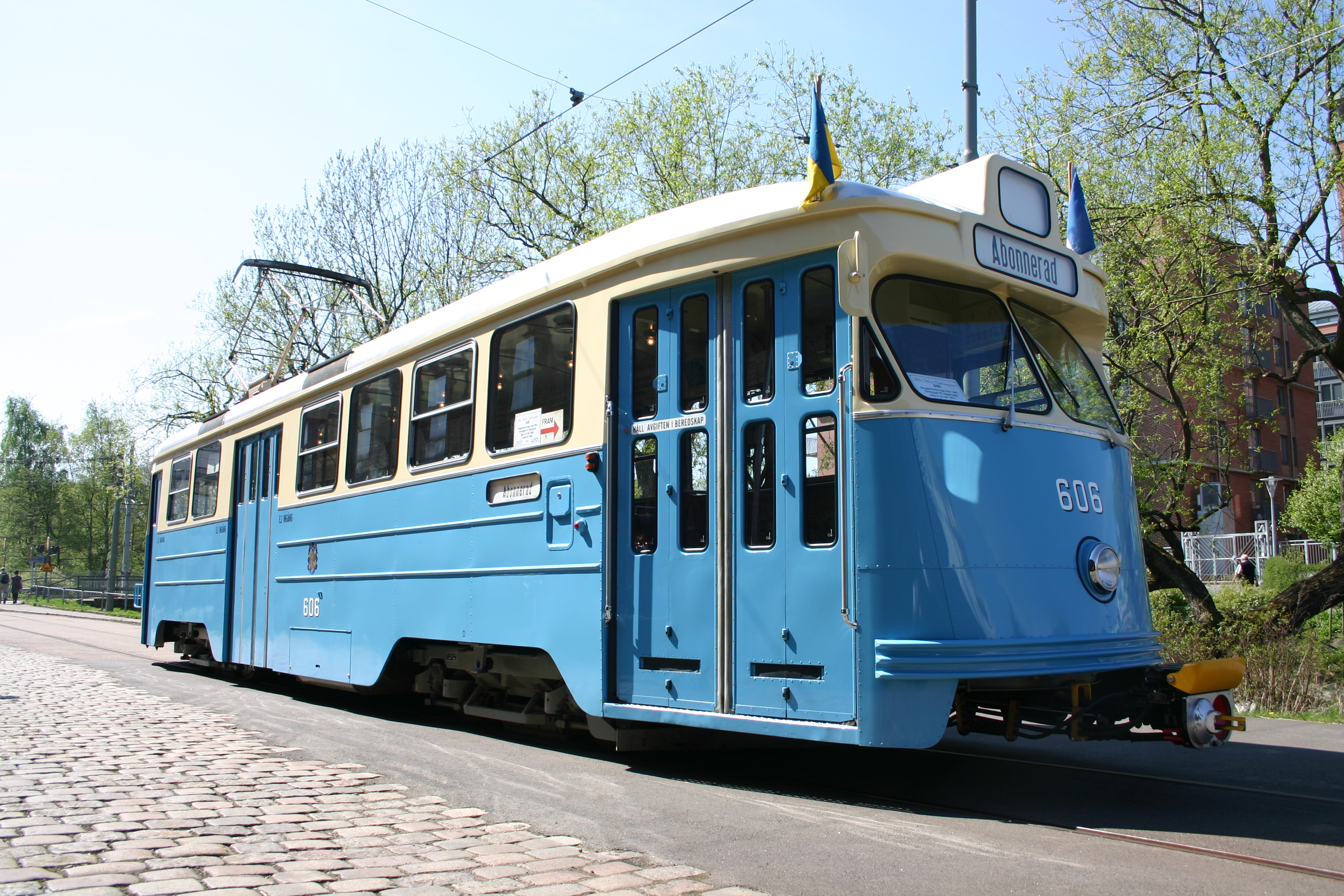
- M25 tram 606 in Gothenburg.
- Manufacturer: Hägglund & Söner
- Constructed: 1958–62
- Number built: 125
- Capacity: 116
- Operators: Göteborgs Spårvägar (1958–1994); Oslo Sporvognsdrift (1991–2002)

Specifications
- Car length: 15.132 metres (49 ft 7.7 in)
- Width: 2.650 metres (8 ft 8.3 in)
- Weight: 18.2 tonnes
- Electric system: 600 V DC overhead line
- Track gauge: 1,435 mm (4 ft 8 1/2 in)

The M25 was a class of 125 four-axle trams built for use on the Gothenburg Tramway in Sweden between 1958 and 1962. The class was used in passenger service in Gothenburg until 1994, undergoing major rebuild to accommodate Sweden's switch from driving on the left-hand side of the road to the right in 1967. After they were withdrawn from service in Gothenburg, 36 members of the class were sold for use on the Oslo Tramway in Norway, where they ran from 1991 until 2002. In Oslo the trams were known as class SM91, and were numbered 264 to 299.

The M25 was one of three similar classes, along with the M28 and M29 classes. All three classes were of similar exterior design, and any combination of them could be operated together in multiple unit with any vehicle leading.

== Specifications ==
The M25 Class was built by Hägglund & Söner as 125 single-car trams from 1958 to 1962. The standard gauge trams are 15.132 metres (49 ft 7.7 in) long, 2.650 metres (8 ft 8.3 in) wide and weigh 18.200 tonnes (17.9 long tons; 20.1 short tons). They are equipped with two bogies, each with two axles, giving a Bo'Bo' wheel arrangement. The axle distance is 1.800 metres (5 ft 10.9 in), the bogie-centre distance is 7.000 metres (22 ft 11.6 in) and the wheel diameter is 680 millimetres (2 ft 3 in).

Each tram has four motors totalling 200 kilowatts (270 hp) in power output, giving a maximum speed of 60 kilometres per hour (37 mph). The trams seat 38 people and stand 78 more. The cars are all single-ended (with a single driving cab) and single-sided (with passenger doors only on one side). Originally all cars were built for operation in left-hand traffic, with doors on the left facing the drivers cab. Cars can operate in multiples of up to three cars together.

== History ==
=== In Gothenburg ===
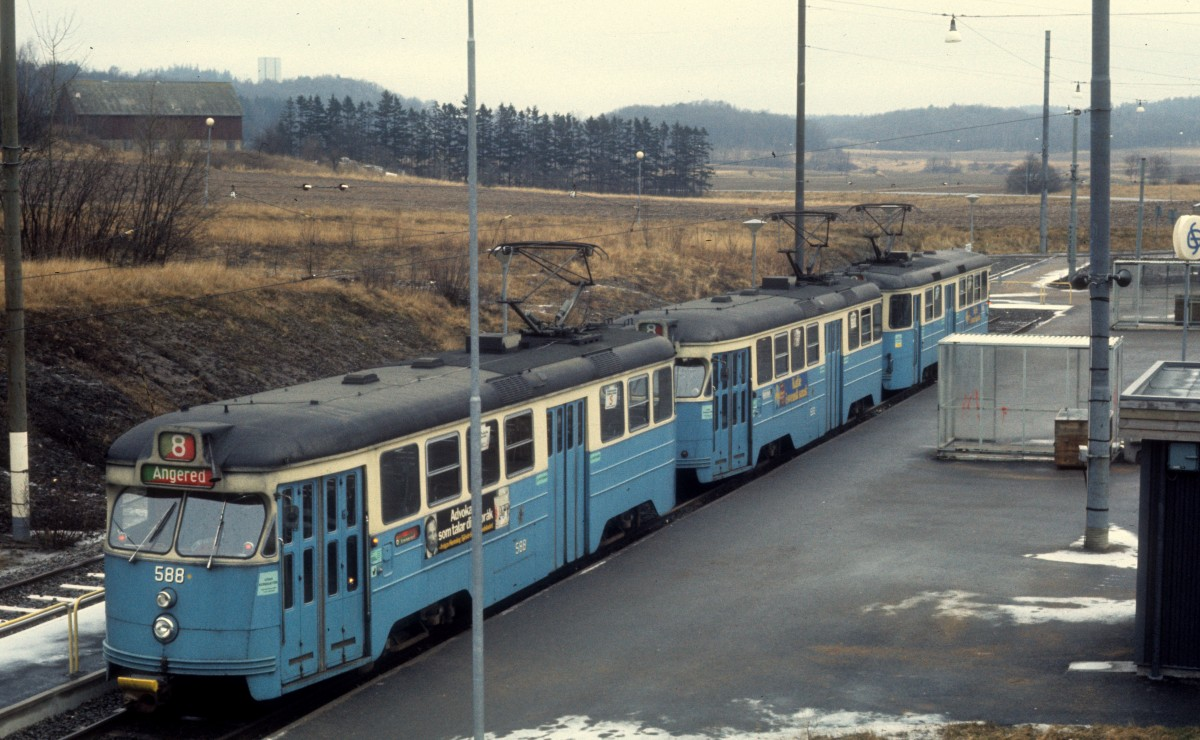
Both left- and right-hand drive versions of the M25 at Storås on the Angeredsbanan in 1975

125 trams were built by Hägglund & Söner for Göteborgs Spårvägar, where they were given the serial numbers 501–625. The first car was delivered on 5 May 1958, and the class first operated in passenger service on 22 January 1959. The final car in the order was delivered on 4 June 1962. Less than a year after that final delivery, Sweden took the decision to change from left to right-side driving on Dagen H (3 September 1967).

Faced with the need to re-equip with trams suitable for right-hand traffic, the tram company ordered an additional 70 trams in the M28 series, and subsequently 60 M29 trams. These cars were built from the start for operation in right-hand traffic, with doors on the right-hand side facing the driving cab. The M28s were delivered before Dagen H, and were coupled back-to-back to an M25 car, thus creating a double-ended but single-sided coupled-pair. Before the change these car-pairs were driven with the M25 leading, after the change the M28 led.

At the same time, most of the M25s were gradually sent back to Hägglunds to be converted to right-hand driving, with the passenger doors moved from the left to the right when facing the drivers cab. This created two sub-classes, the original M25v and the converted M25h. As with the M28s, M25v and M25h trams were coupled-back to back and operated from the M25v until Dagen H, and from the M25h thereafter. The original intention was to convert all M25v trams to M25h, but the conversion process was stopped with 15 conversions outstanding.

The reason for retaining the 15 M25v trams was the opening in 1969 of the initial phase of the Angeredsbanan that had stub terminals but had all its platforms on the eastern side of the track. The 15 M25v trams were converted to M25Av trams, along with 15 M25h trams that were further converted to M25Ah trams. Trams ran in three or four car trains, with an M25Ah tram at the Gothenburg end and an M25Av at the Angered end. The further conversion was required because the Angeredsbanan used 750V electrical supply as opposed to the 600V of the city trams, and also because of the higher speeds and tunnel sections encountered.

By 1979 the Angeredsbanan had been extended and provided with turning loops, but the M25Ah/v trams continued to serve the route, as did the M25h trams on the city routes. However between 1984 and 1992, the six-axle M21 class was delivered, replacing the M25 class. The last M25 ran in passenger service in 1994.

=== In Oslo ===
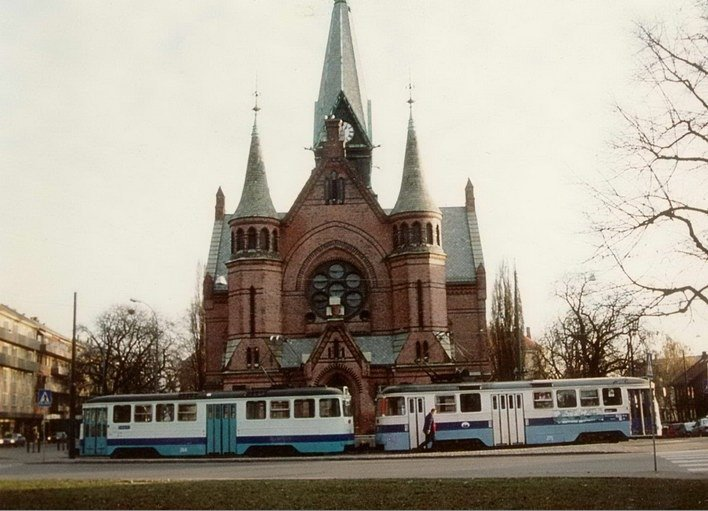
A pair of SM91 trams at Sagene in Oslo in 1998. Car 264 (left) was the only left-hand drive tram transferred to Oslo.

In the early 1990s, Oslo's Ring 3 bypass highway was being upgraded, and this caused a disruption to the Grünerløkka–Torshov Line at Storo where it crosses this highway. To continue operations on the line, trams had to turn without a turning loop, but Oslo Sporvognsdrift did not have enough trams which could run this way. However, Gothenburg had a number of surplus M25 trams capable of running back-to-back. The trams were therefore purchased by Oslo at the token price of NOK 1 each, although upgrading the trams for Oslo use cost NOK 200,000.

All but one of the trams transferred to Oslo were of the M25h (or M25Ah) sub-class. The method of operating into stub terminals used on the Angeredsbanan could not be adopted in Oslo as the tram routes had platforms in the conventional near-side position. Instead two right-hand drive trams were coupled back-to-back, and only the leading tram carried passengers. The rear tram had to be closed as its doors were facing the wrong side of the road. After the need for double-ended sets had passed, M25 trams continued to operate as single cars or in pairs coupled with the doors on the same side.

Safety concerns over the SM91 were raised after a fatal accident in 2001. Oslo Sporvognsdrift stopped operating the trams in multiple, and they were phased out as they were replaced with the new class SL95 trams. The final usage was in 2002.

== M25 in preservation ==
Six members of the M25 class still exist in preservation.

Number	Location	Notes	Image
552	Gårdahallen, Gothenburg	Retained by Göteborgs Spårvägar as a training car and now stored in a drivable condition but missing part of the original interior. Intended for transfer to the Museispårvägen Malmköping at Malmköping.	
582	Gårdahallen, Gothenburg	Owned by the Ringlinien Tramway Society and drivable in museum traffic. The only M25 tram still in the original left-hand drive configuration, having been used on the Angeredsbanan. It was renovated in 2011 and is preserved in its condition in 1969.	
599	Sporveismuseet Vognhall 5, Oslo	Preserved as SM91 277, as operated in Oslo. Not exhibited.	
602	Mannaminne	Not drivable.	
606	Gårdahallen, Gothenburg	Owned by the Ringlinien Tramway Society and drivable in museum traffic. It is preserved in its 1969 condition.	
621	Gårdahallen, Gothenburg	Owned by the Ringlinien Tramway Society and drivable in museum traffic. It is preserved in its 1967 condition. Often loaned to Göteborgs Spårvägar as a training vehicle.	

== 2001 accident ==
During the class's operation in Oslo, safety concerns were raised after a fatal accident during the evening rush hour at Holbergs plass on 16 January 2001. A mother with a stroller caught her foot by the tram doors as she was entering, and was dragged behind the tram when it started to move. The injuries she sustained were fatal.

It was later found that the tram driver had reported trouble with the tram's doors several times in the hours before the accident. Four minutes before the accident, she had requested a new tram, but was denied one because there were no more trams available. Prior to the fatality, there had been several incidents with passengers getting caught in the doors as they were carrying strollers, although in the previous incidents the tram had been able to stop before the situation became more serious.

In the aftermath of the accident, Oslo Sporvognsdrift stopped coupling the trams together in two-car trains and ran them only individually. The safeguards against people getting trapped in the doors were also replaced, and emergency handles were installed. Both the tram company and the female 30-year-old tram driver were charged with negligent homicide. In the Oslo District Court, both the company and the driver were acquitted on the homicide charge, but found guilty on lesser counts. On appeal, the tram company was finally convicted in Borgarting Court of Appeal and ordered to pay a fine of NOK 5 million; this was the first time a company had been found guilty of homicide in Norway. The conviction against tram driver on the lesser counts regarding failure to demonstrate due care in the traffic were upheld, and she received a 30-day suspended jail sentence.
