= Iladalen Park (Oslo) =

Park in Oslo, Norway

Coordinates: 59°55′53.38″N 10°45′6.93″E

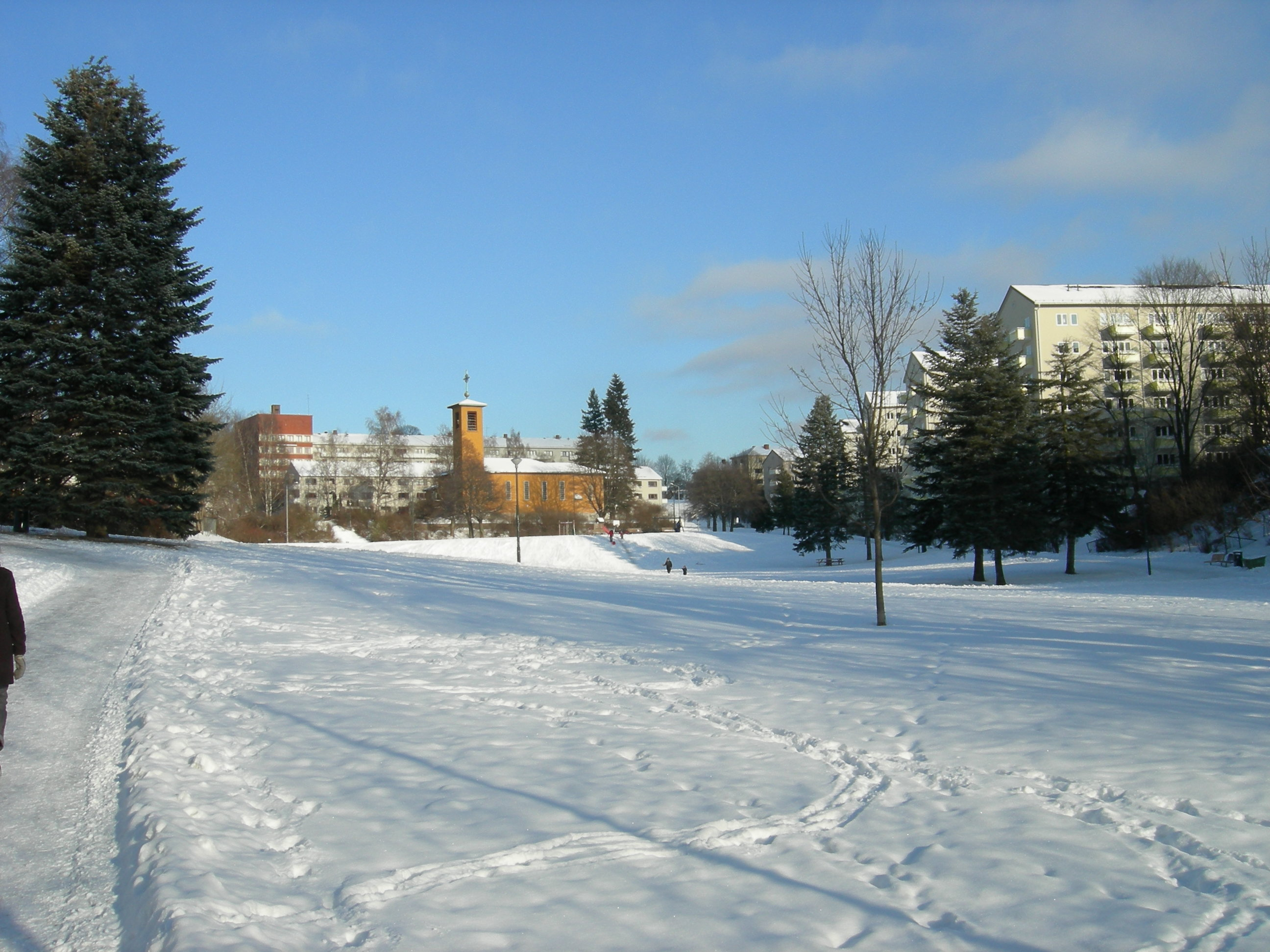
Iladalen Park in winter

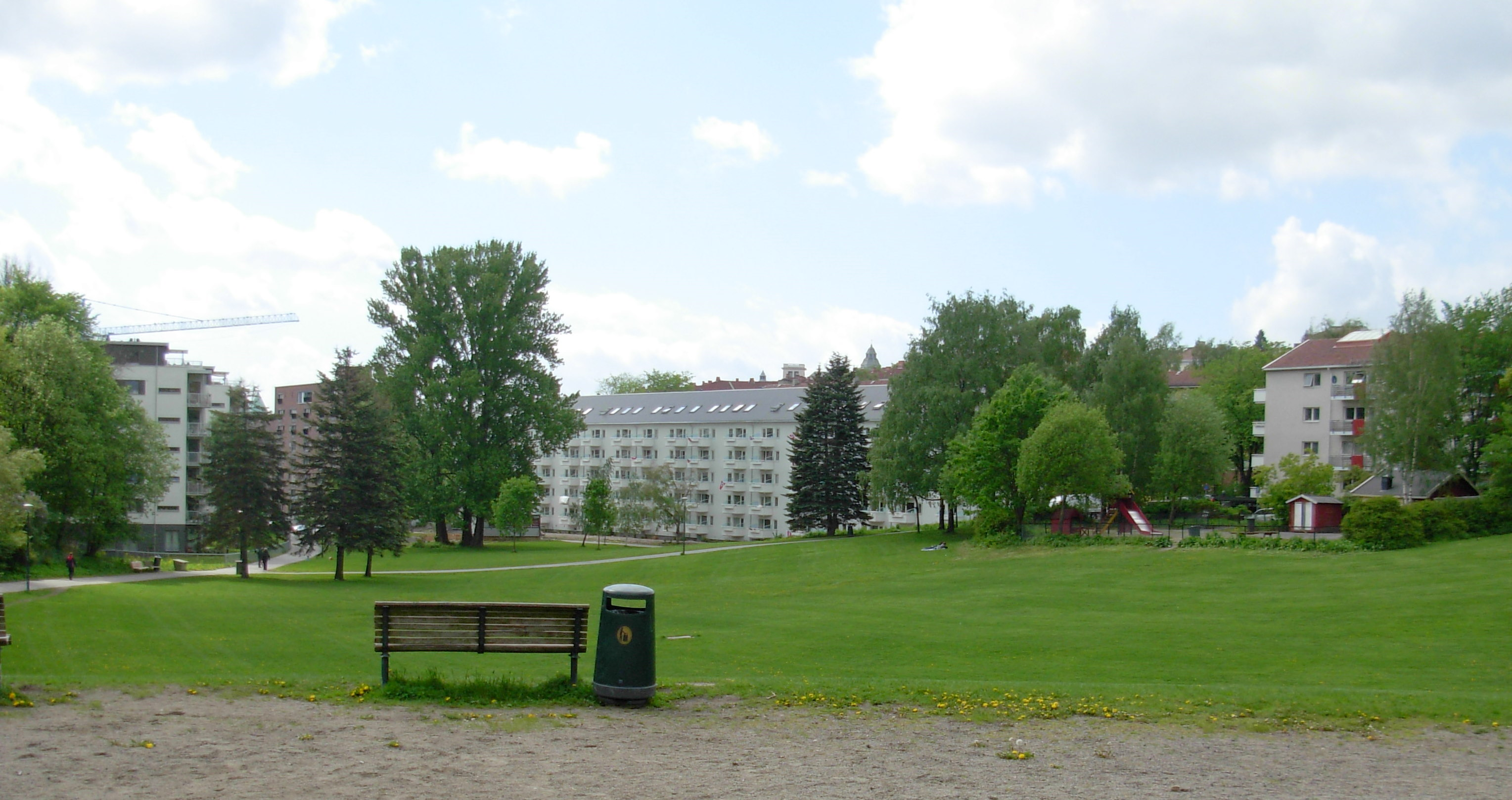
From the playground to the south

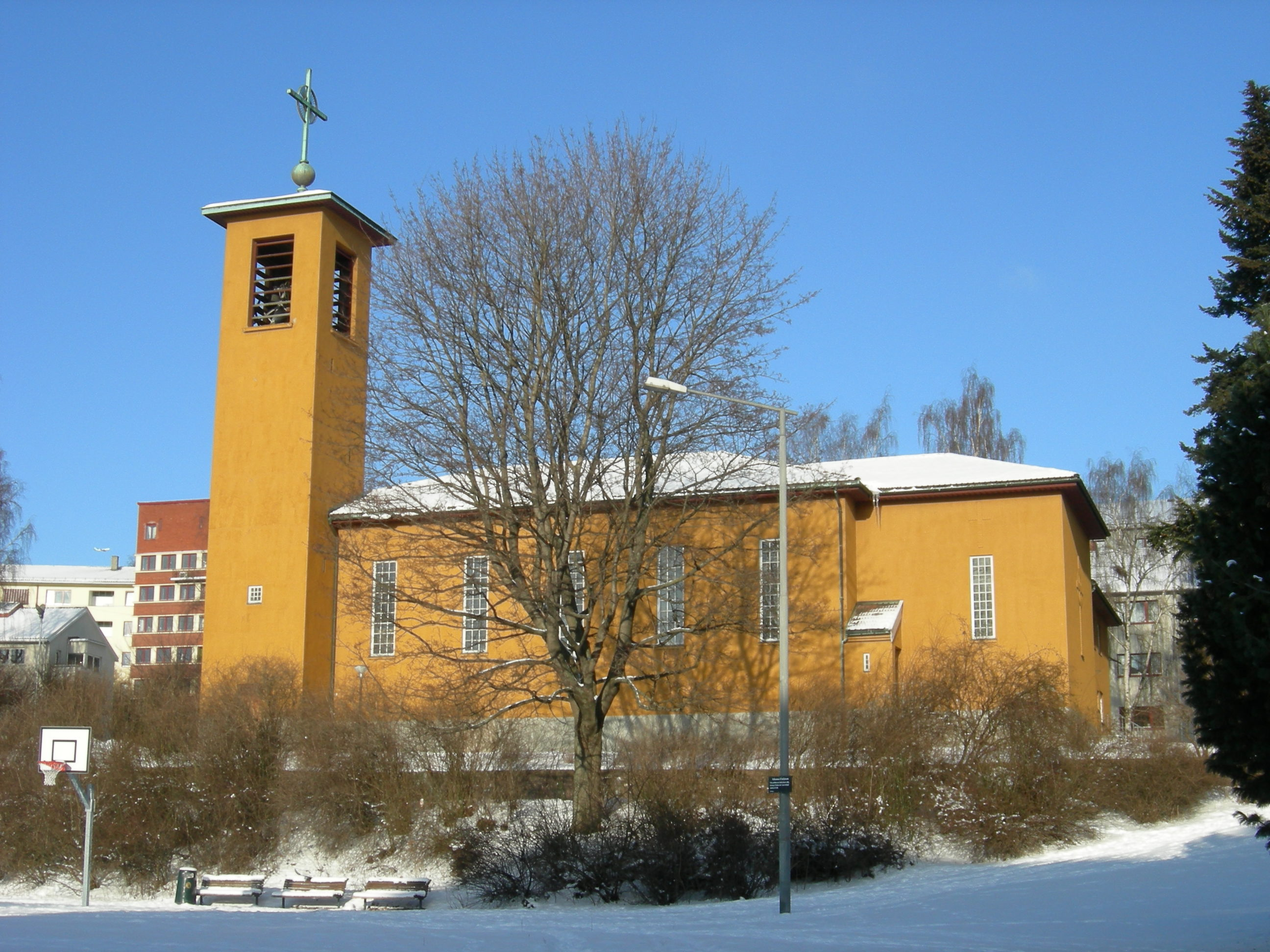
Iladalen Church

Iladalen Park is a park in the borough of Iladalen in the district of Sagene in Oslo, Norway. The 27.9-acre park was established in 1948. The park is the centerpiece of the overall planned residential facility in Iladalen, and is the city's best preserved park in the functionalist style, with simplicity and objectivity in design.

To the north of the park is a 3.3-acre playground, with bronze sculpture "Kalv" by Ørnulf Bast, added in 1957. Iladalen Church (Iladalen kirke) is also located adjacent to the park. The church is built of brick and was constructed during 1941.
