= Sagene =

Borough of Oslo, Norway

Bydel Sagene
- Borough
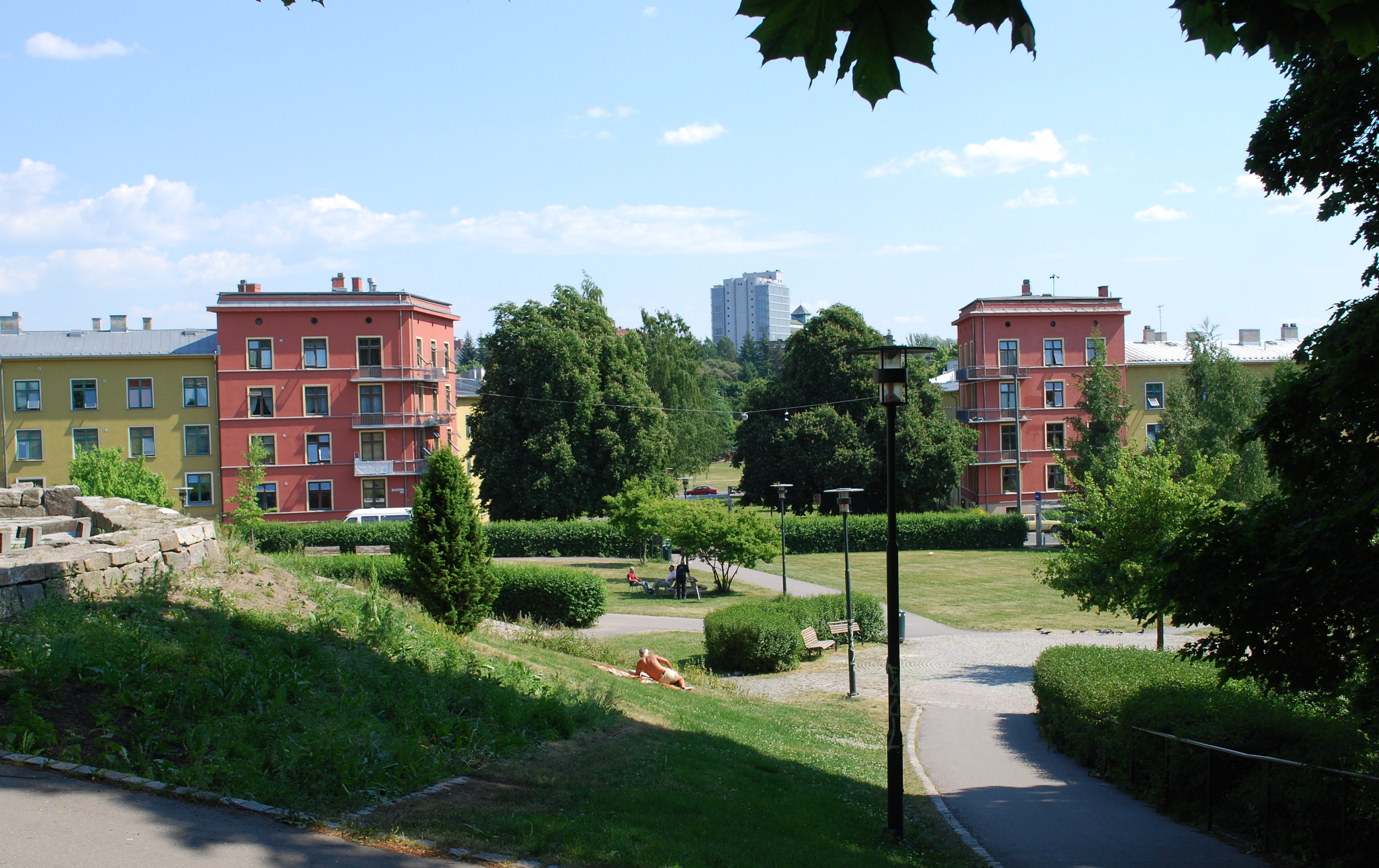

- Coat of arms

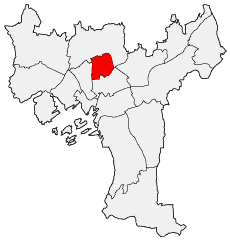
- Coordinates: 59°56′14″N 10°45′22″E
- Country: Norway
- City: Oslo

Area
  - Total: 3.1 km^{2} (1.2 sq mi)

Population (2020)
  - Total: 45,089
  - Density: 14,545/km^{2} (37,670/sq mi)
- Time zone: UTC+1 (CET)
  - Summer (DST): UTC+2 (CEST)
- ISO 3166 code: NO-030103
- Website: bsa.oslo.kommune.no

Sagene is a borough of the city of Oslo, Norway. The area became part of the city of Oslo (then Christiania) in 1859. The name Sagene itself is the plural of the Norwegian word for "saw", reflecting all the old industrial mechanical saws powered by the river Akerselva in this area in the 19th and early 20th centuries.

== Area ==
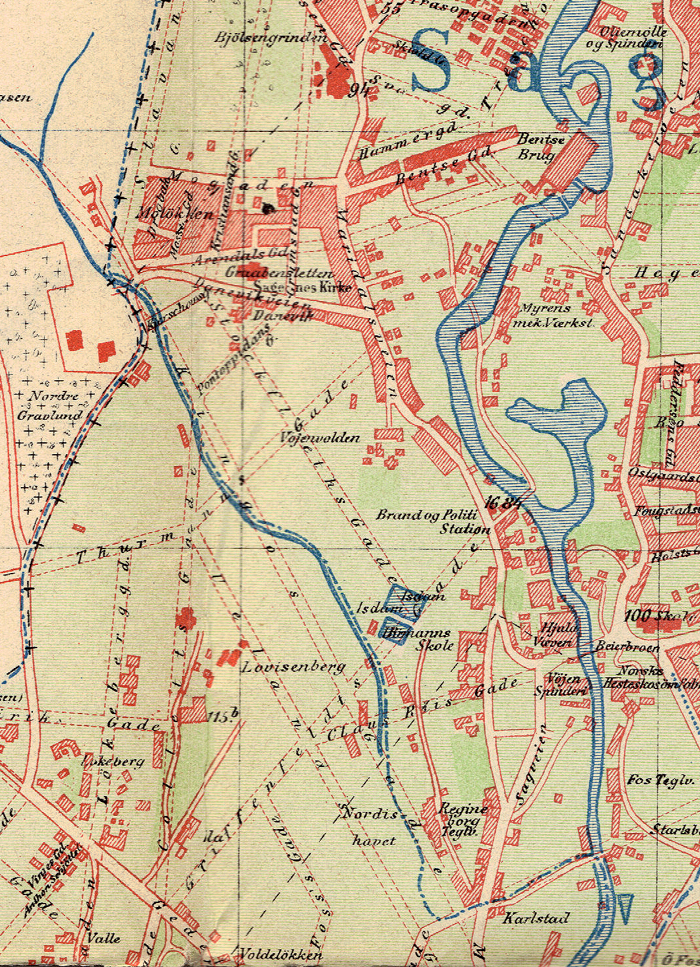
Map of Sagene, ca. 1900

The borough of Sagene includes the neighborhoods of Sagene, Bjølsen, Iladalen (Ila), Sandaker, Åsen, and Torshov. It is the smallest borough of Oslo, but compared to its relatively small size, it has a noteworthy population by Norwegian standards. In the west its border is the street Uelandsgate and the cemetery (gravlund) Nordre gravlund. In the north it borders Tåsen and Storo. The border then follows the valley Torshovdalen in the east, and borders the areas of Rodeløkka and Grünerløkka is the south.

Running through the borough of Sagene is the river Akerselva which has contributed in shaping the culture and history of the borough. The river has been exploited for energy, and along it for a thousand years, mills and turbines have been operating. The main street is called Vogts Street. and it's in Torshov. The tram goes down this street, which is the most busy street in the Sagene/Torshov borough. The street is highly urbanised with plenty of stores and coffee shops. Vogts gate is in the heart of Torshov.

== History ==
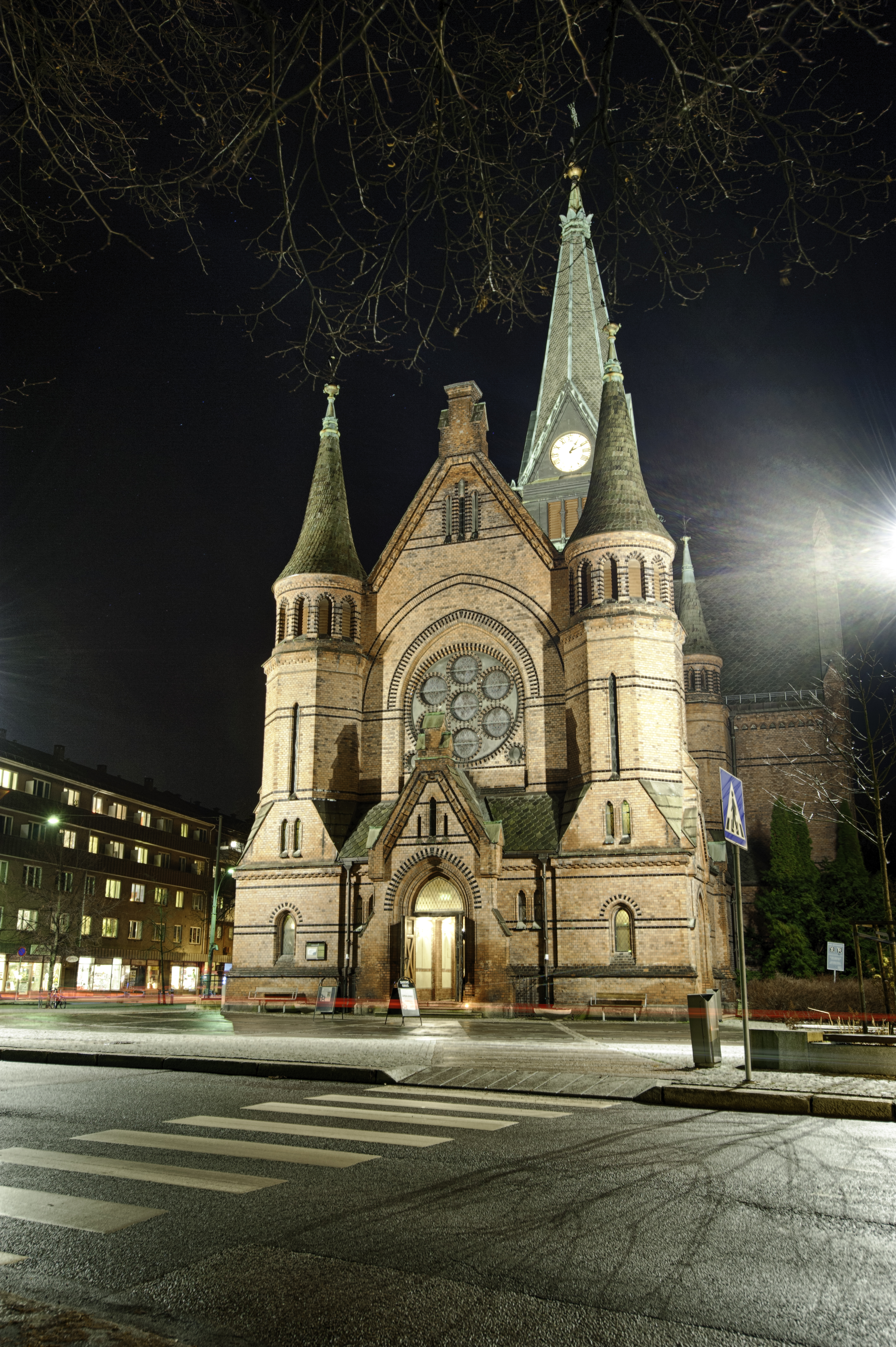
Sagene Church

Norway's oldest industrial building - Glads Mølle papermill - is located in Sagene. The cradle of industrialism in Norway stood here in the mid-19th century with establishments such as Graahs Spinneri and Hjula Væveri. Author Oskar Braaten (1881–1939) grew up and got inspiration for his books in this environment. Today the old factories are filled by modern industries, in large parts with media, information technology (IT) and graphical businesses. Small wooden houses along the streets Maridalsveien and Sandakerveien are memories of the incoming dwellings of the 18th century, while the laborers' housing of the 19th century was built in concrete.

Sagene Church (Sagene Kirke) was designed by architect Christian Furst. It was opened in 1891 and is monumental for the area. The church was built in Neo-Gothic style revival style and it was consecrated in 1891. The altarpiece is a copy of the one in the cathedral in Antwerp. The altarpiece was executed by the painter Christen Brun (1828-1905) and shows the removal of Jesus from the cross.

After the World War I the area around Torshov (now part of the borough of Sagene) and Sagene was planned to be a "city within the city" with some 2,000 apartments. This can still be experienced in Torshov today. The esteemed Soria Moria building from 1928 houses theatre, cinemas, restaurants and other cultural events and offerings.

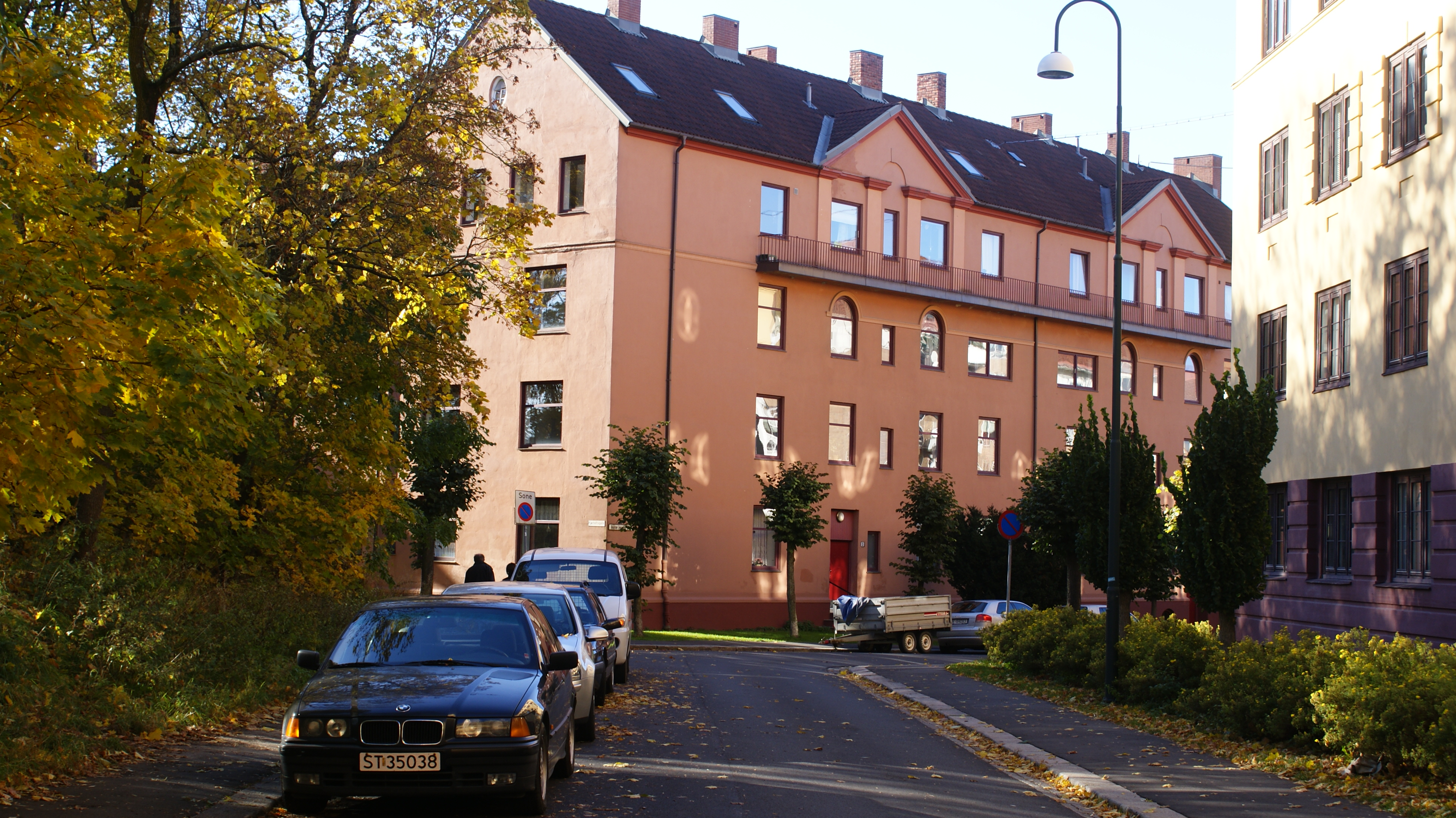
Gustav Jensens gate near Det Rivertzke Kvartal

In 2003 Sagene was one of the four boroughs in Oslo with direct elections to the boroughs council, the rest being appointed by the city council. During the period 2003-2007 the leader of the borough council was Tone Tellevik Dahl from the Labour party, with her deputy being Jan Fredrik Pedersen from the Socialist Left Party. The borough council consisted of 5 representatives for the Socialist Left, 4 for Labour, 2 each for Conservatives and Progress and 1 each for the Red Electoral Alliance and the Liberals. In the 2007 borough election Labour became the largest party, with 5 representatives, the Socialist Left and the Conservatives both getting 3 seats, the Liberals 2 and Progress and the Red Electoral Alliance 1 each.

== Parks ==
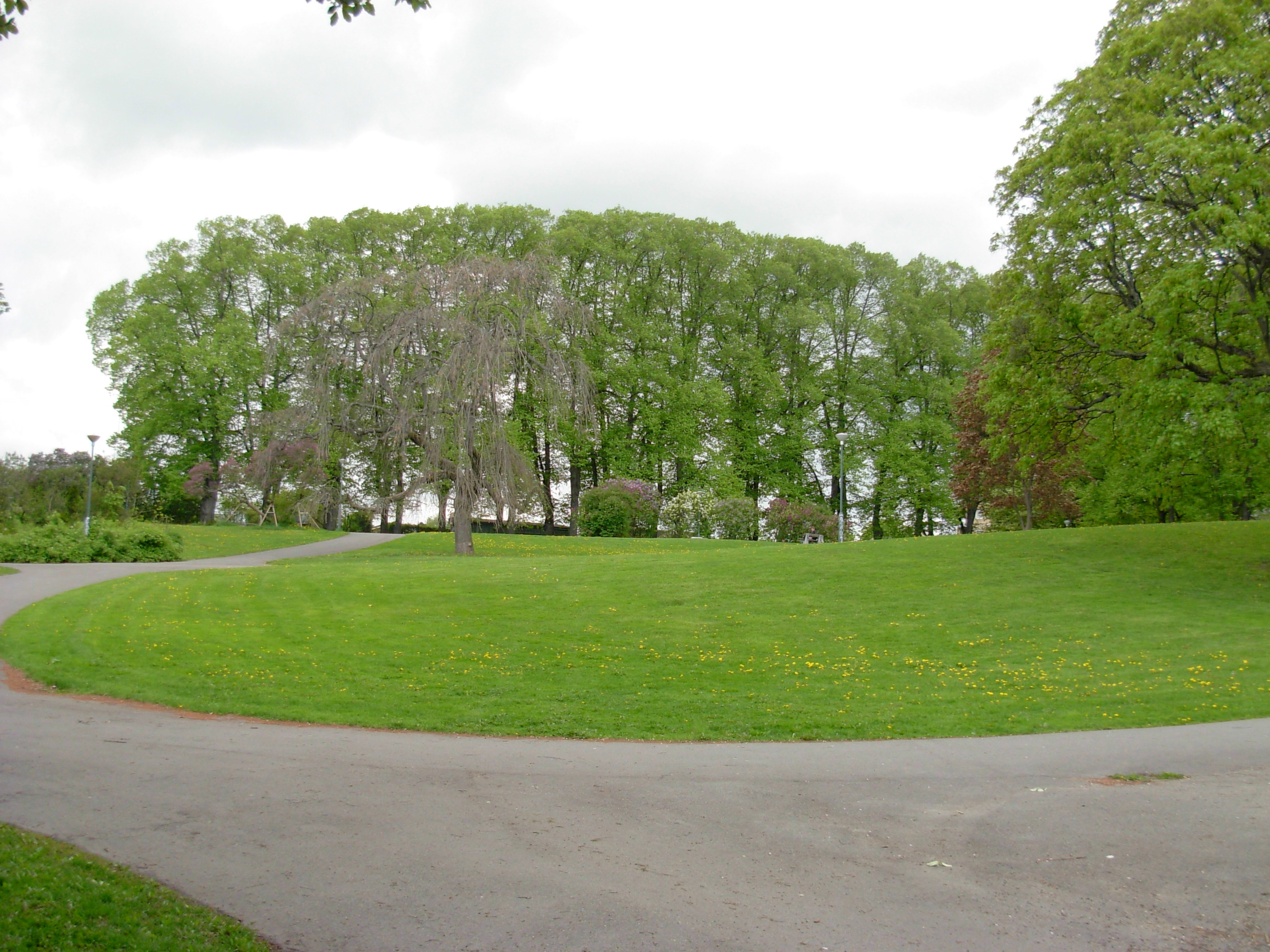
Bjolsenparken in Bjølsen

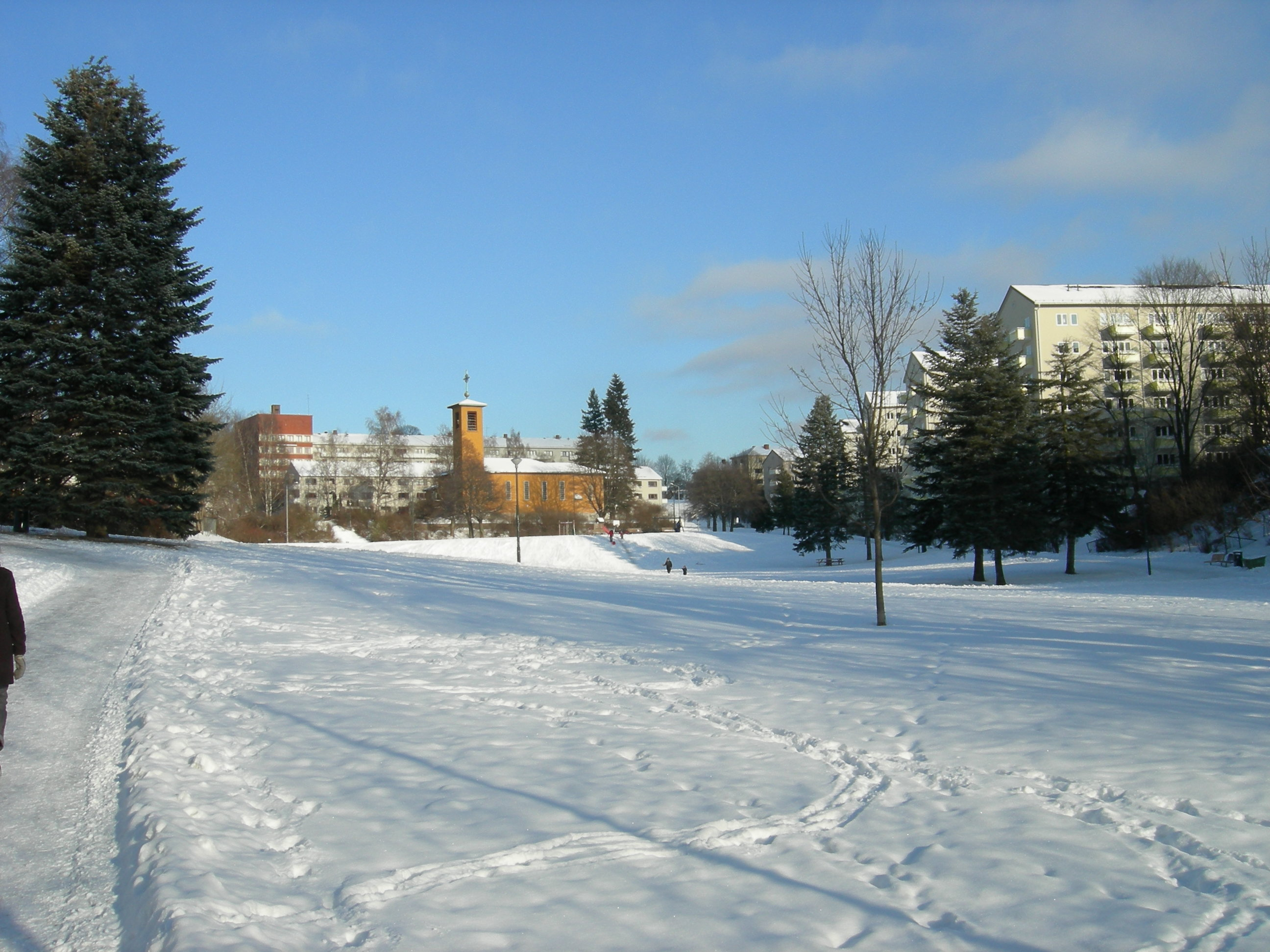
Iladalen Park in Iladalen

- Bjølsenparken is 34 acres and known for a beautiful linden tree-lined street which runs north-south along the park's highest point.
- Iladalen Park is in the borough of Iladalen. The 27.9-acre park was established in 1948.

== Sagene Depot ==
Sagene Depot (Norwegian: Sagene vognhall) is a repurposed tram depot in Stockfleths gate at Sagene in Oslo, Norway. Two hall units, several apartments and offices, a forge and a workshop constitute the depot. The two hall units are preserved, and are now used as a cultural meeting place.

In 1902, three years after the Sagene Line had opened, Kristiania Kommunale Sporveie built one hall unit for the tramway.[1] An additional hall unit was later constructed.

== Notable landmarks ==
- Torshovparken
- Torshov
- Sagene Kirke
- Myrens verksted
- Lilleborg (company)
