= Iladalen Church =

- Iladalen kirke
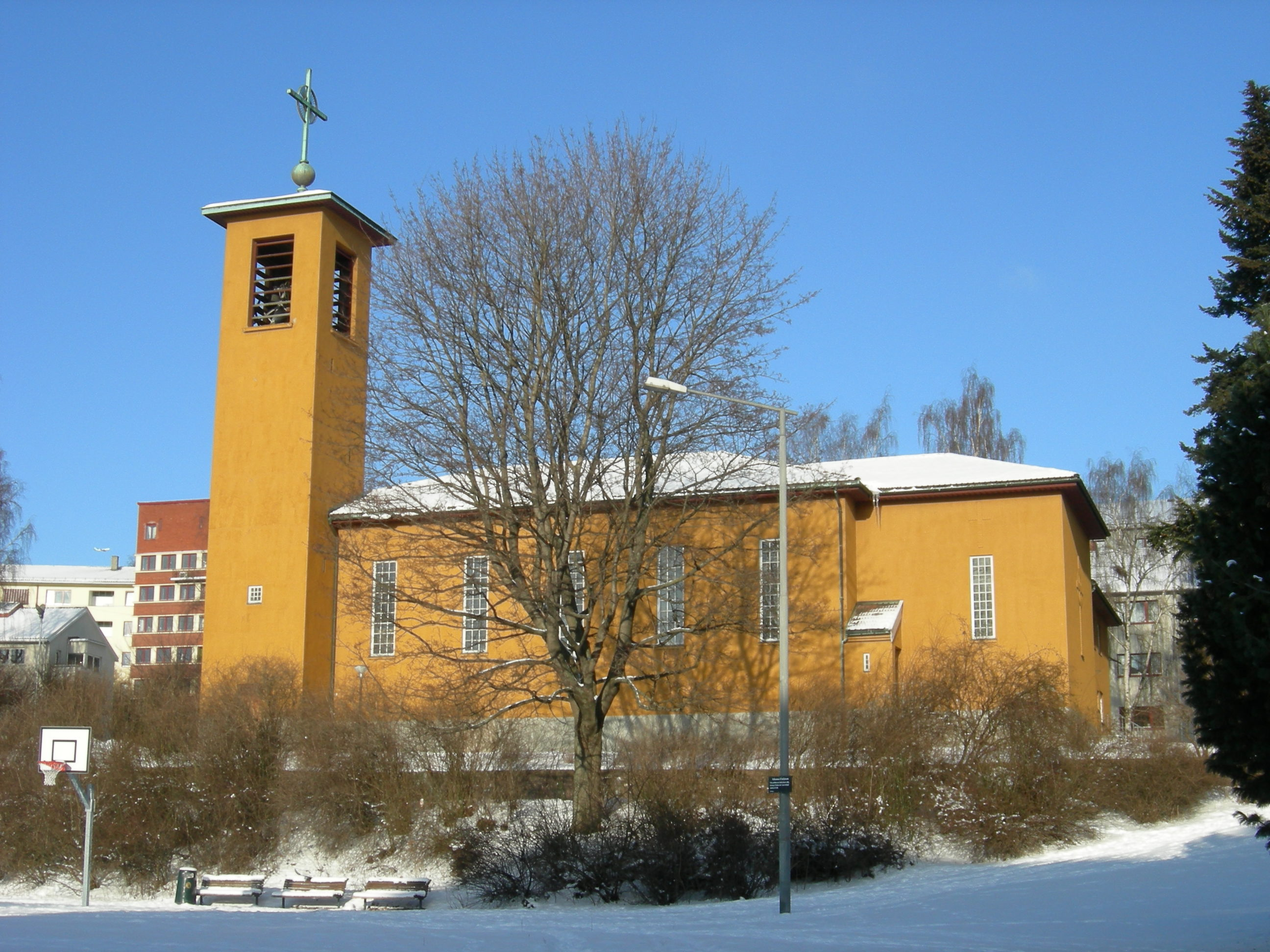
- Iladalen Church
- 59°55′58.21″N 10°45′10.65″E
- Location: Søren Jaabeks gate 5 Oslo,
- Country: Norway
- Denomination: Church of Norway
- Churchmanship: Evangelical Lutheran
- Website: www.oslo.kirken.no

History
- Status: Parish church
- Consecrated: 1941; 85 years ago

Architecture
- Functional status: Active
- Architect: Ragnar Nilsen

Specifications
- Capacity: approx. 700 totally
- Materials: Brick

Administration
- Diocese: Diocese of Oslo
- Deanery: Nordre Aker
- Parish: Sagene og Iladalen

Iladalen Church is a church center, located in Oslo, Norway. The church was consecrated on May 22, 1941 (during World War II) by Bishop Eivind Berggrav as Iladalen småkirke ("Iladalen Chapel"). The church was then nicknamed the "Velsignelsens kirke" ("Church of Blessing") by the bishop.

The church has facades of a tiled yellow brick, low pavement, roofed with red tiles, and the church tower is to the right side of the main entrance. The altarpiece is designed by Per Vigeland, and is carved by Wilhelm R. Sjøwall. Per Vigeland has also done the wall fresco and the stained glass behind the church organ. Chandeliers and lamps are designed by the architect. The church organ is from 1971 and has 11 voices. The two church bells are cast by Olsen Nauen Bell Foundry.

The church is listed by the Norwegian Directorate for Cultural Heritage and protected by law.
