= Trinity Church (Arendal) =

Church in Agder, Norway

- Trefoldighetskirken
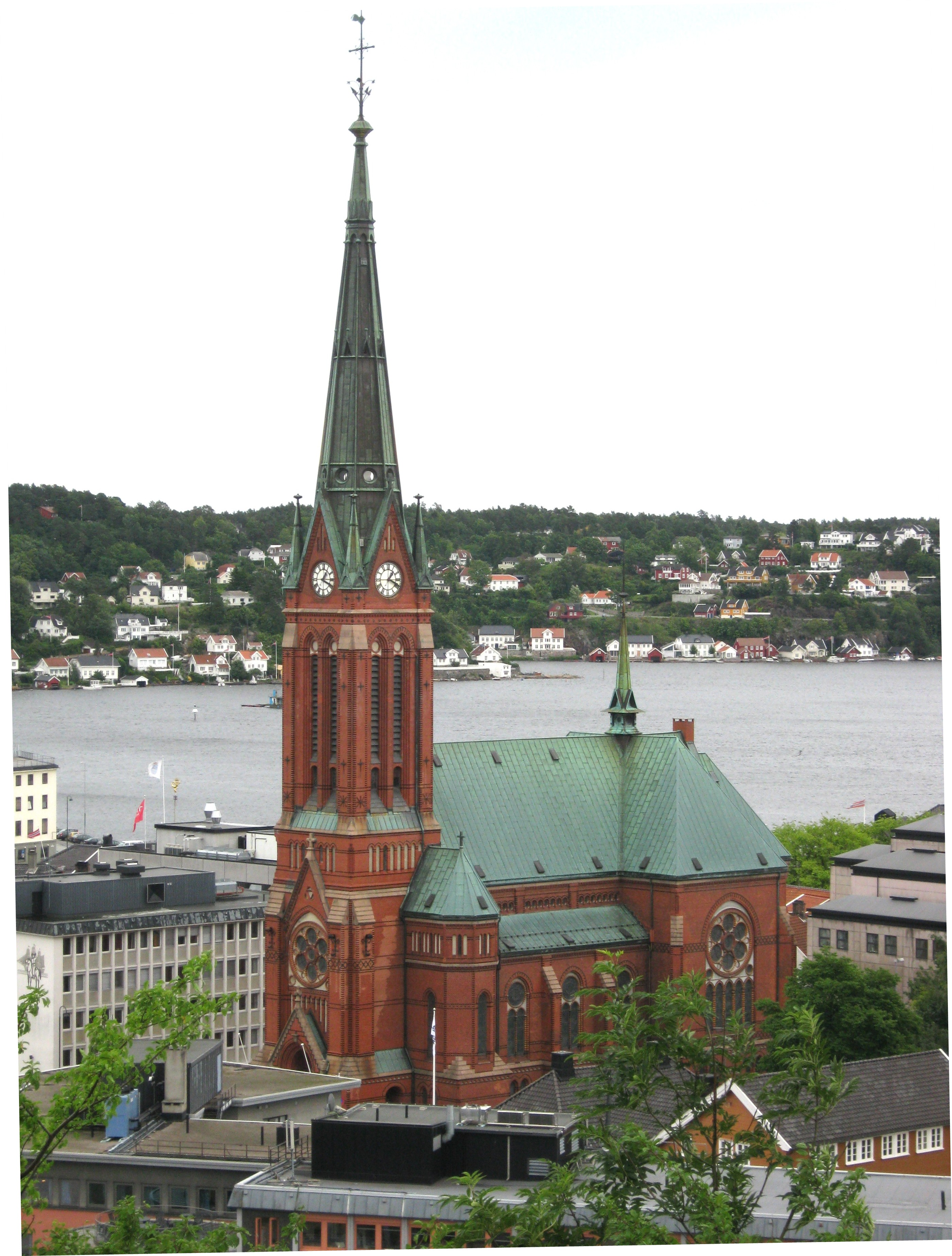
- View of the church
- Trinity Church
- 58.459215°N 08.765762°E
- Location: Arendal Municipality, Agder
- Country: Norway
- Denomination: Church of Norway
- Churchmanship: Evangelical Lutheran

History
- Status: Parish church
- Founded: 1670
- Consecrated: 29 June 1888
- Events: 1902: Fire

Architecture
- Functional status: Active
- Architect: Christian Fürst
- Architectural type: Long church
- Style: Neo-Gothic
- Completed: 1888 (138 years ago)

Specifications
- Capacity: 850
- Materials: Brick

Administration
- Diocese: Agder og Telemark
- Deanery: Arendal prosti
- Parish: Trefoldighet
- Norwegian Cultural Heritage Site
- Type: Church
- Status: Listed
- ID: 83790

Trinity Church (Norwegian: Trefoldighetskirken) is a parish church of the Church of Norway in Arendal Municipality in Agder county, Norway. It is located in the central part of the town of Arendal. It is the church for the Trefoldighet parish. It is also the seat of the Arendal prosti (deanery) in the Diocese of Agder og Telemark. The red, brick, neo-Gothic church was built in a cruciform basilica design in 1888 using plans drawn up by the architect Christian Fürst. The church seats about 850 people.

== History ==
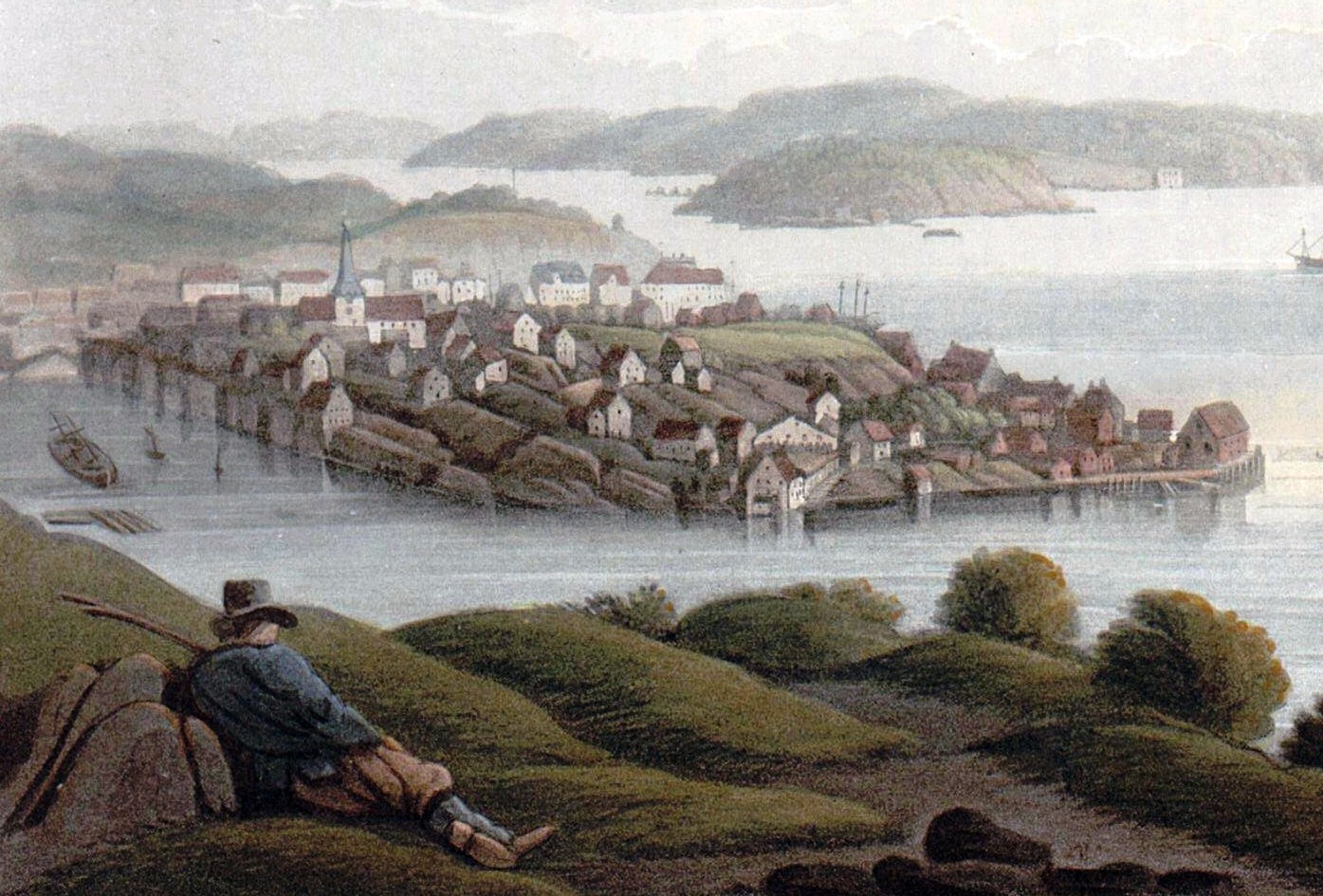
Drawing from c. 1800, Arendal with the first Trinity Church

=== First church ===
There have been three churches in the town of Arendal, and all of them were called "Trinity Church" (Norwegian: Trefoldighetskirken). In 1669, the new little town called Arendal received permission to build its own church. The first church was built in 1670 out of timber and in an east–west direction, just west of the current site of the church. It was consecrated on 6 December 1670. The eastern section was divided into two wings, giving it a Y-shape (one of only 10 churches in Norway with that design). One wing had was the altar and the king's chair, the other an organ. The pulpit was placed where the wings meet. In 1714, a gray stone tower was added to the north wing.

In 1814, this church served as an election church (Norwegian: valgkirke). Together with more than 300 other parish churches across Norway, it was a polling station for elections to the 1814 Norwegian Constituent Assembly which wrote the Constitution of Norway. This was Norway's first national election. Each church parish was a constituency that elected people called "electors" who later met together in each county to elect the representatives for the assembly that was to meet at Eidsvoll Manor later that year.

The church eventually became too small for the town and congregation and it also was in need of many repairs, so it was demolished in 1832 to make room for the new church.

=== Second church ===
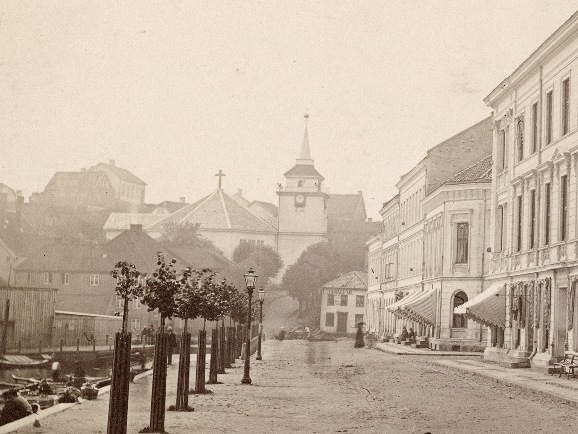
The former church from 1836. Image: Norwegian Directorate for Cultural Heritage

After tearing down the old church, a new church was constructed on the same site. This new church was designed by Christian H. Grosch and it had an octagonal design with 555 seats. The tower from the old church was retained and incorporated into the new church. The foundation stone was laid down in 1833 by Crown Prince Oscar (later, he became the king of Sweden and Norway). The church, which was completed in 1835, had no altar, but a large gypsum replica of Bertel Thorvaldsen's famous Christ sculpture. The new building was consecrated on 23 March 1836.

=== Third church ===
In 1880, when Arendal was at its height as a town based on shipping, it was decided to build a new, much larger church. An architectural competition was then announced to design the church. The competition was won by the 27-year-old architect Christian Fürst, who was a student of the German architect Johannes Otzen. The foundation stone was laid down on 7 August 1885 in a large ceremony. This Trinity Church is built of brick. The new church was consecrate on 29 June 1888 by the Bishop Jacob Sverdrup Smitt. The church has 1,200 seats and at that time was the largest church in Aust-Agder county. Following today's modern fire codes, the church can hold about 850 people.

The roof is covered with copper plates. The influence of Otzen is also seen in the use of materials, a brick stone type with smooth surface. The church has three church bells in addition to a carillon. The altarpiece scene is "Jesus blesses the eleven apostles before his ascension." The altarpiece was painted by August Eiebakke.

During the night of 12–13 January 1902, the church had a fire, but the damage was not very extensive and the church was repaired. In 1909, scaffolding was set up around the whole exterior to clean and replace the fire damaged bricks.

== Location ==
Trinity Church is located in a sloping terrain in the town of Arendal. To improve the church's surroundings, a bazaar was built around the church into the street shortly after the church was built. The church bazaar is a plaza surrounded by a brick wall with round arches. It is the only church bazaar in Norway that was designed and built simultaneously with the church.

== Media gallery ==
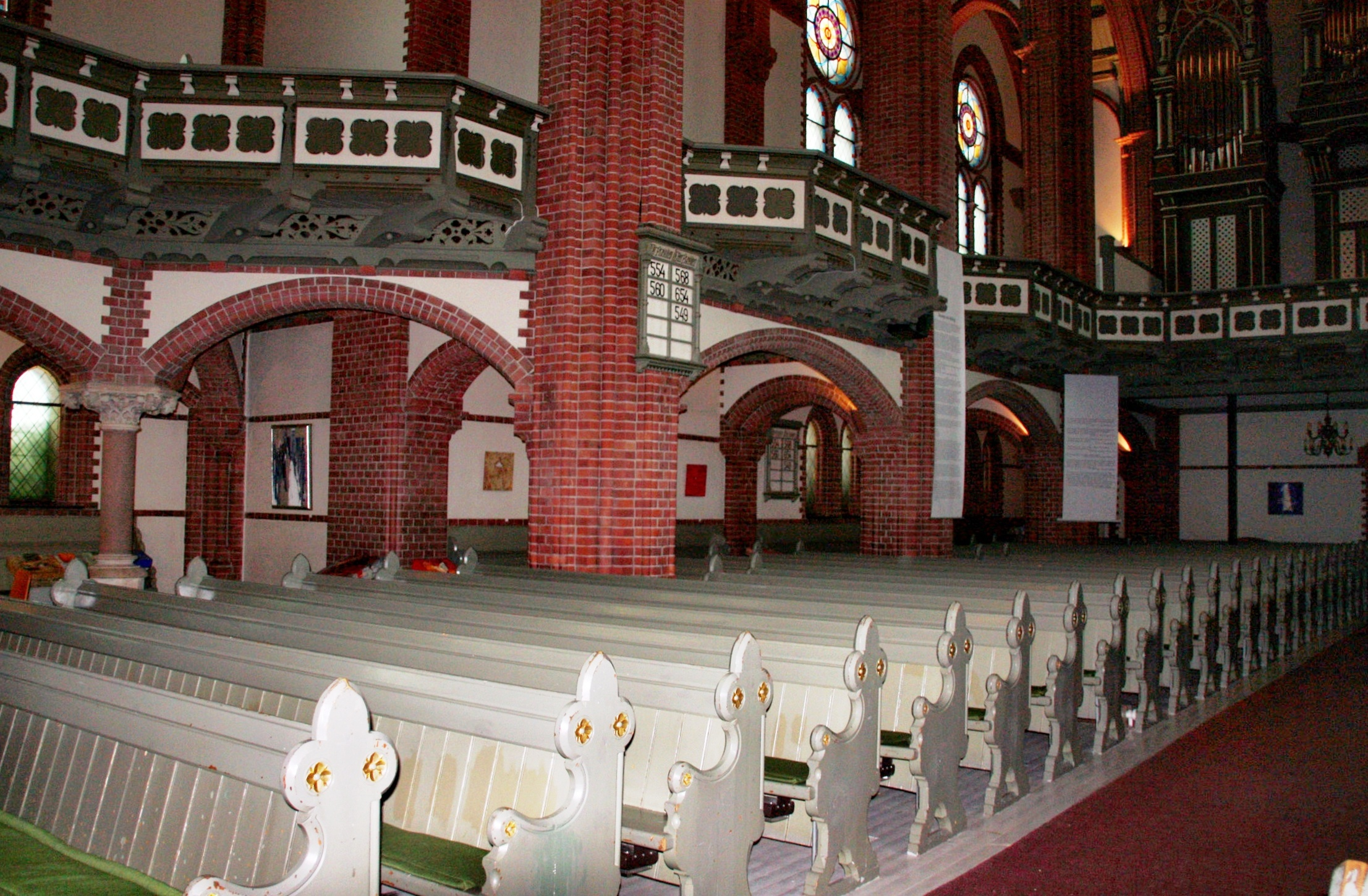
Interior

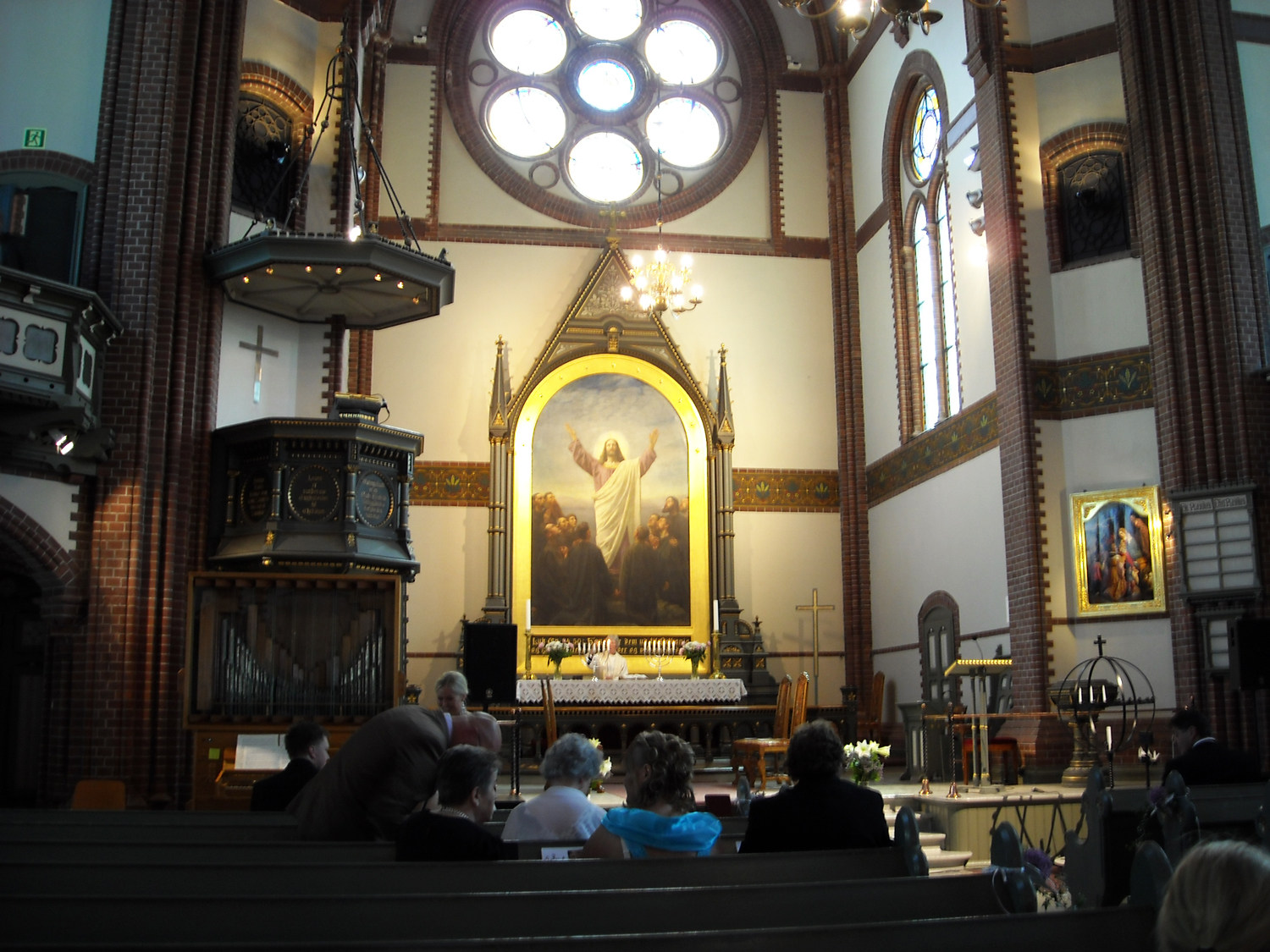
The choir in Trinity Church

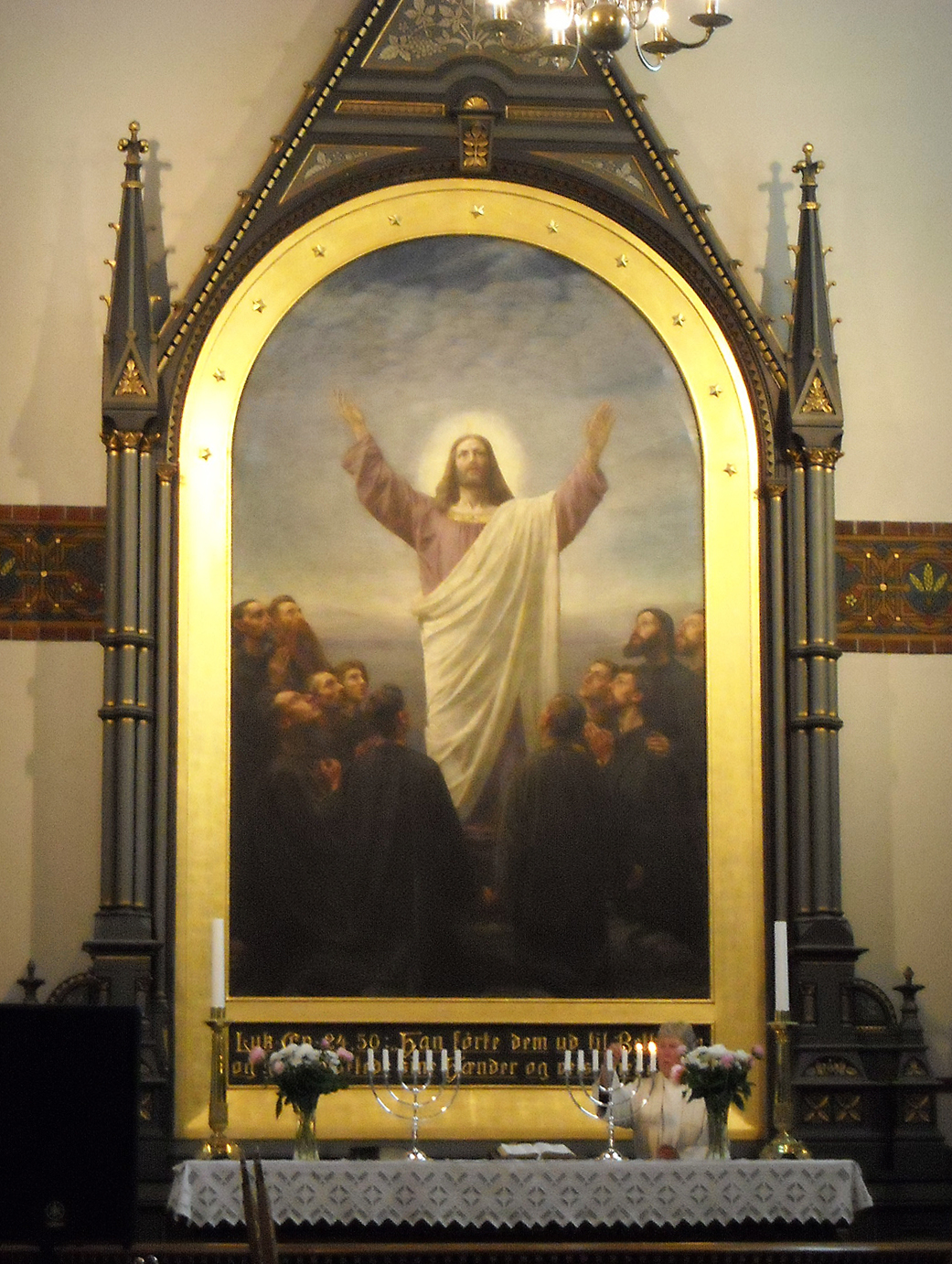
The altarpiece (close-up)

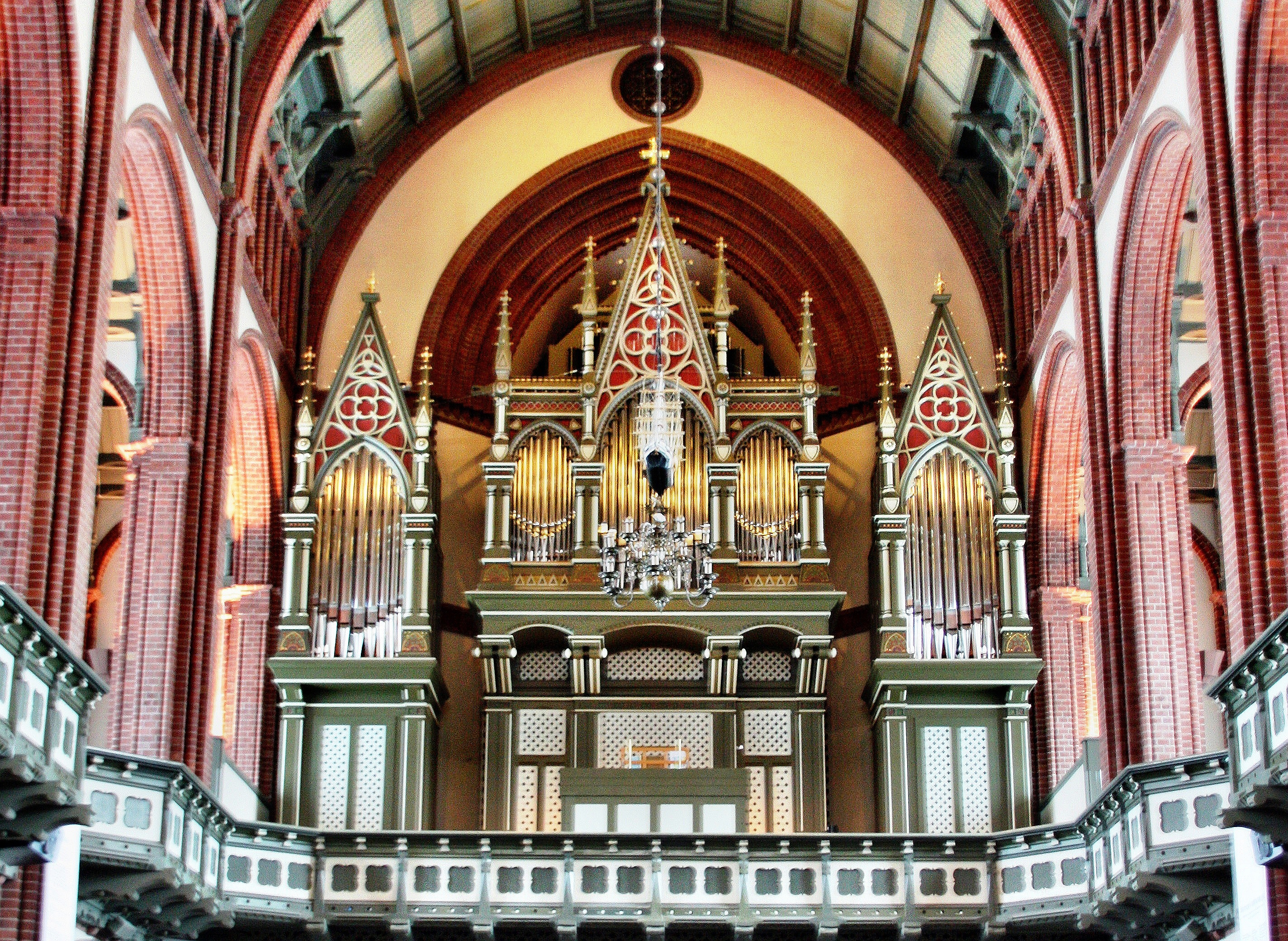
The church organ

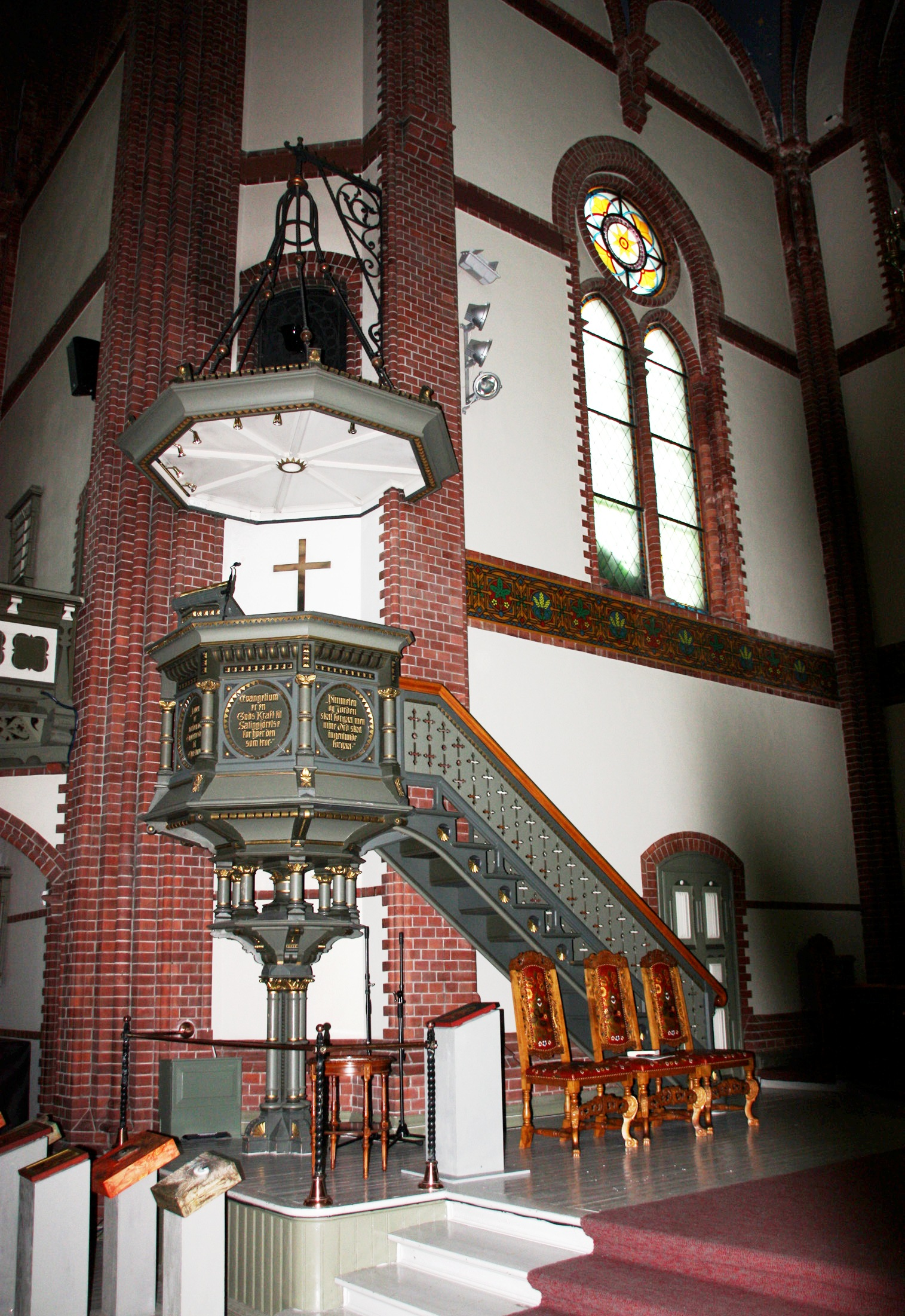
The pulpit

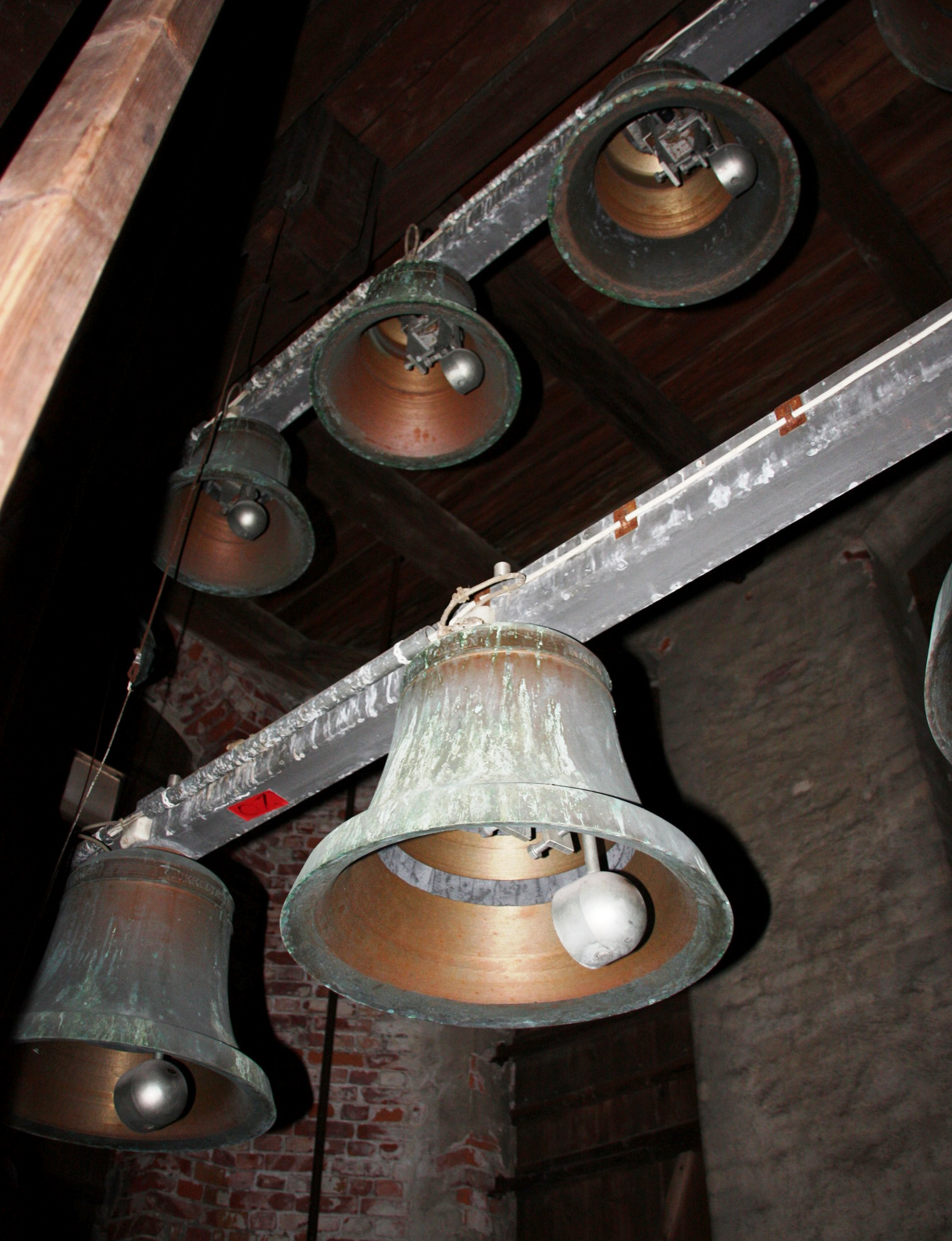
The church bells and the carillon

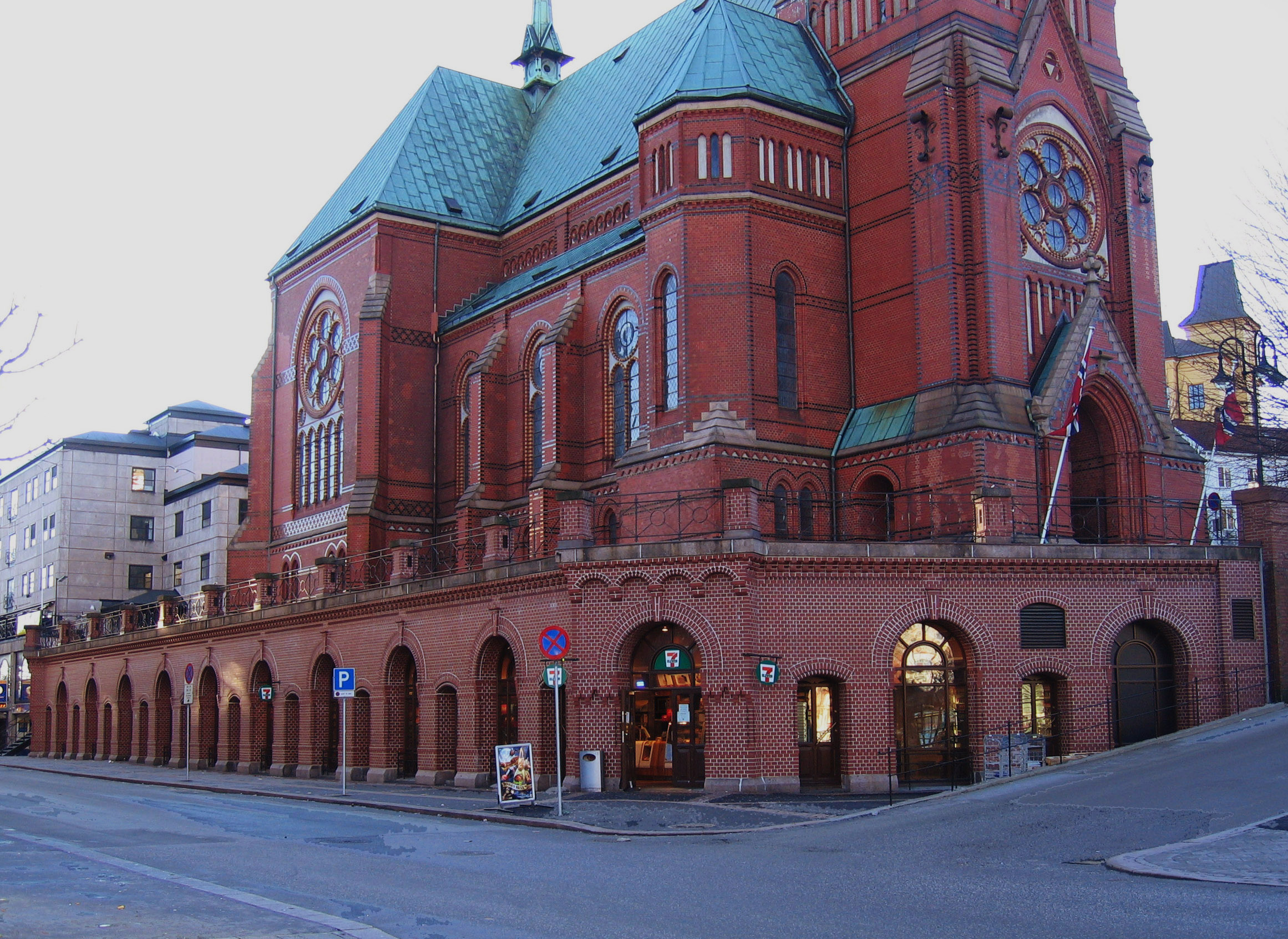
The church bazaar

== See also ==
- List of churches in Agder og Telemark
