= Sagene Church =

- Sagene kirke
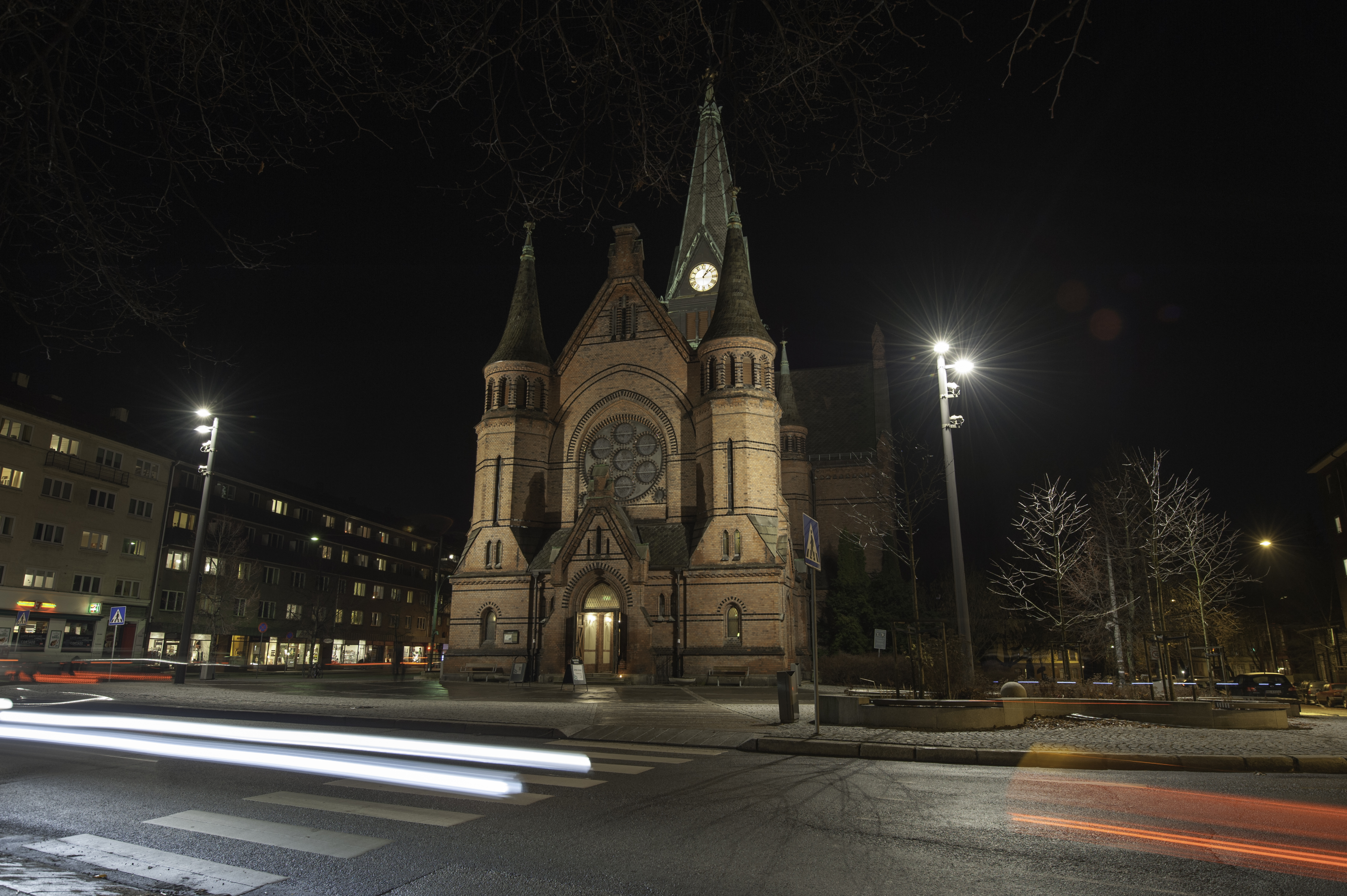
- Sagene Church
- 59°56′16″N 10°45′11″E
- Location: Dannevigveien 17; Sagene; Oslo,
- Country: Norway
- Denomination: Church of Norway
- Churchmanship: Evangelical Lutheran
- Website: www.kirken.no

History
- Status: Parish church
- Consecrated: 1891

Architecture
- Functional status: Active
- Architect: Christian Fürst

Specifications
- Capacity: neo-Gothic
- Materials: Brick

Administration
- Diocese: Diocese of Oslo
- Parish: Sagene

Sagene Church is located in Oslo, Norway. The church is one of the most rugged and prominent in Oslo. The church was built in gothic revival style and it was consecrated in 1891. It was designed by architect Christian Fürst in neo-Gothic style. There are 600 seats.

Fountain and landscaping around the church were conducted from 1891 to 1895, and upgraded from 1923.

The altarpiece was executed by the painter Christen Brun and shows the removal of Jesus from the cross. At the choir stairs a large baptismal fresco with a dove, the symbol of the Holy Ghost, created by Carsten Lien in 1919, restored in 1959.

The pulpit is octagonal, made of pine and is from 1890.

The church has a number of stained-glass windows. a large rose window above the main entrance, four windows in the middle of the choir with Old and New Testament motifs. Closest to the church ship are six stained-glass windows, each displaying two apostles with stylized ornaments in between. The stained glass windows are made by the glass master G. A. Larsen, designed by Sigurd Nilsen.

The church is known for its church organs. The main church organ with 35 voices is from 1891 and is the only remaining of Hollenbach organs in Norway. Another church organ was placed at the choir in 2015.

The church has three church bells, cast by the German firm of C. Albert Bierling, Dresden in 1891.

Sagene Church is listed by the Norwegian Directorate for Cultural Heritage.

== In popular culture ==
The first half of the "O helga natt" scene from episode 9 of the 3rd season of the critically acclaimed Norwegian TV show Skam takes place in the church interior. The character of Isak (portrayed by Tarjei Sandvik Moe) famously storms out of a Christmas concert performed (among others) by Nils Bech to go meet his boyfriend Even (portrayed by Henrik Holm).

== Gallery ==
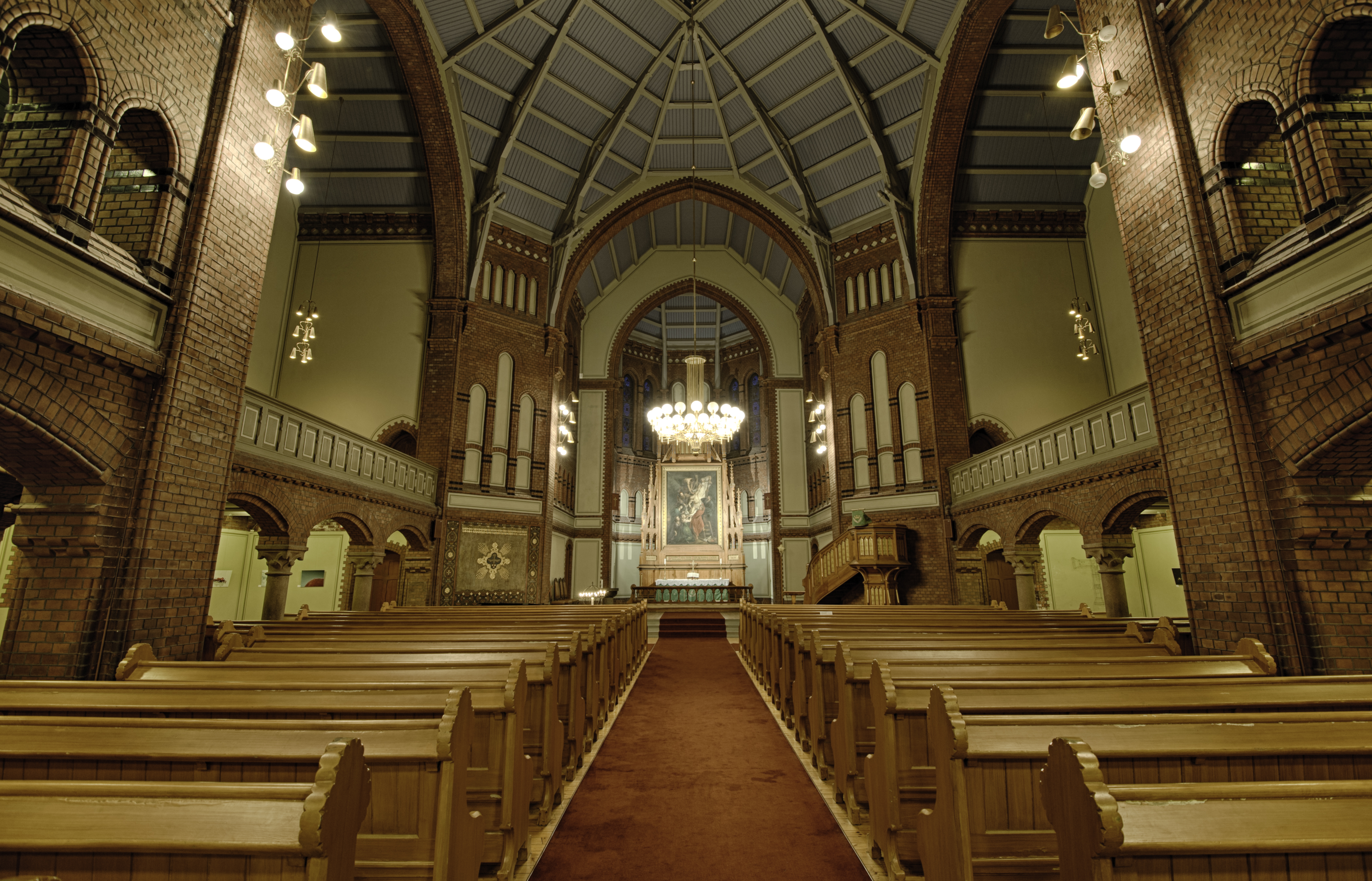
Interior

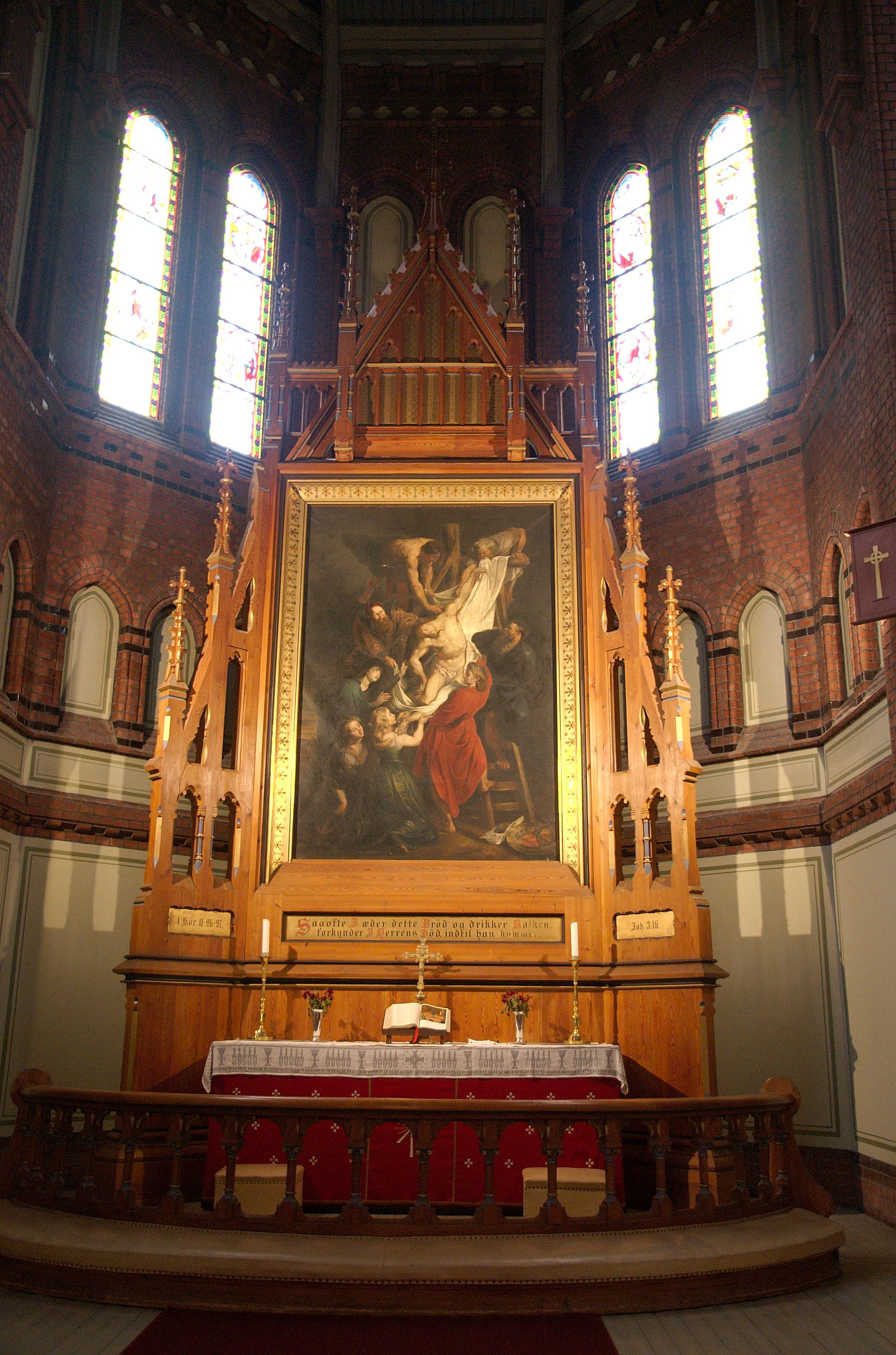
The altarpiece at Sagene Church by Christen Brun

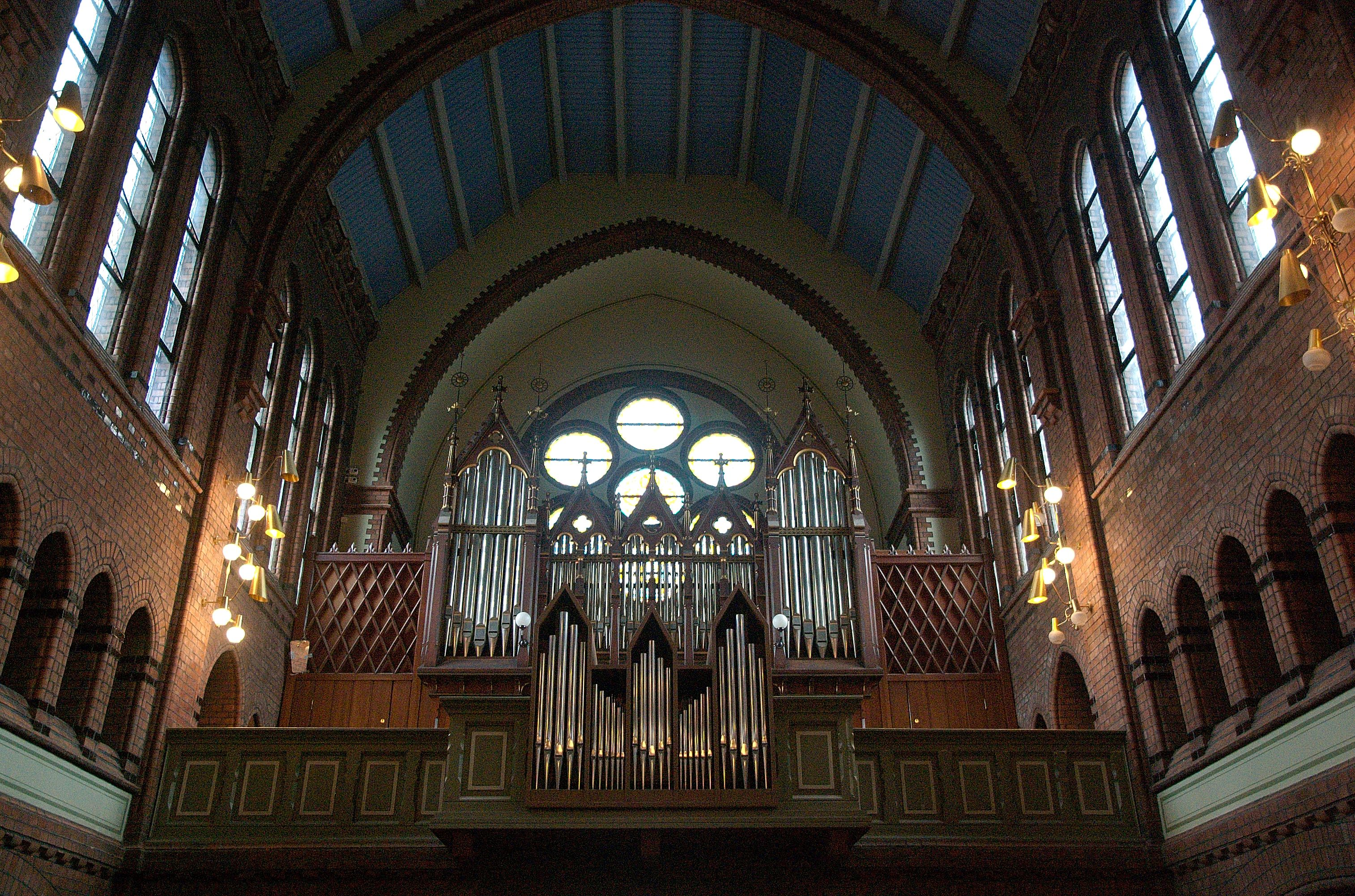
The main church organ at Sagene Church

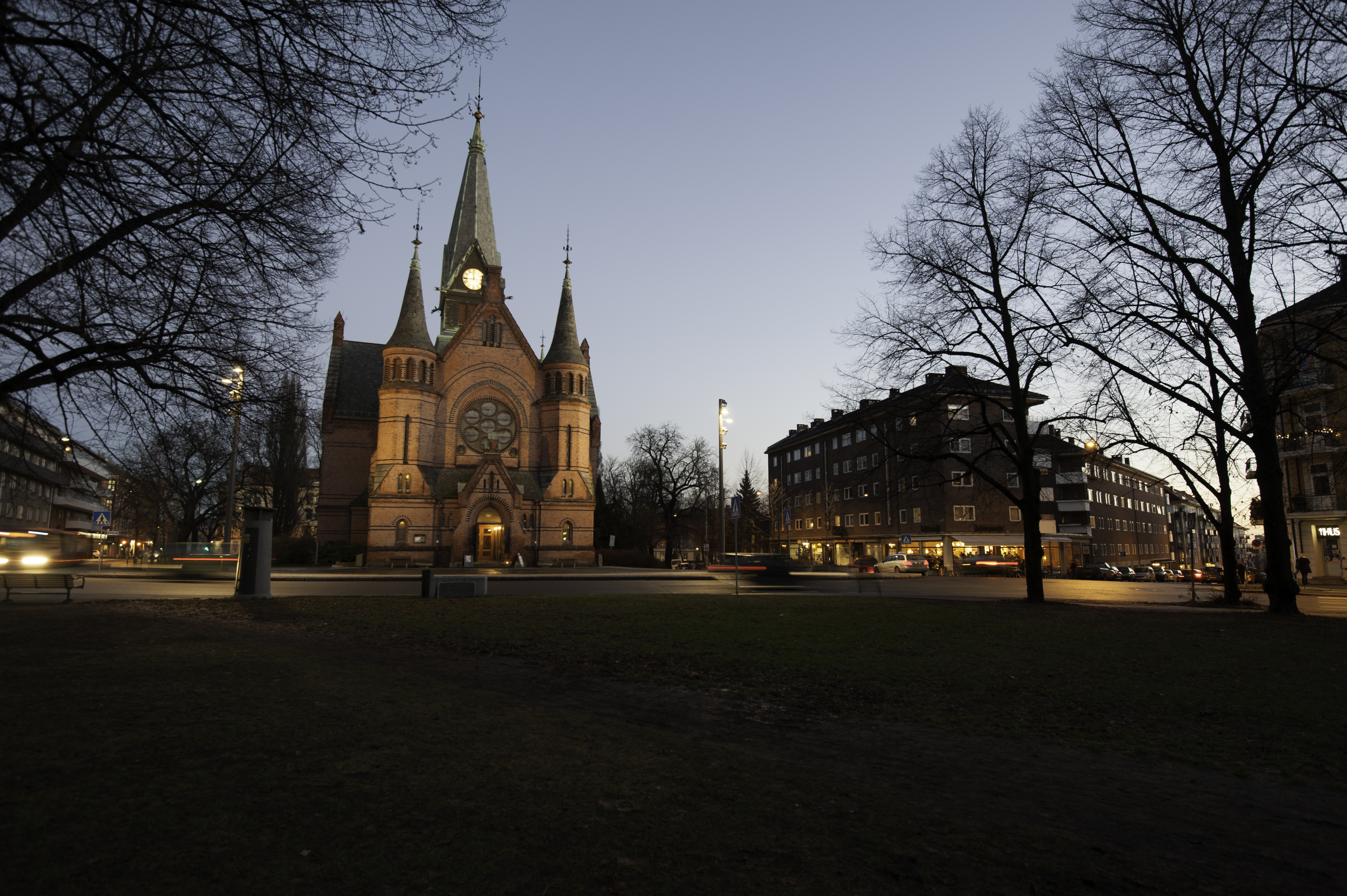
Sagene church viewed from a nearby park, November 2012

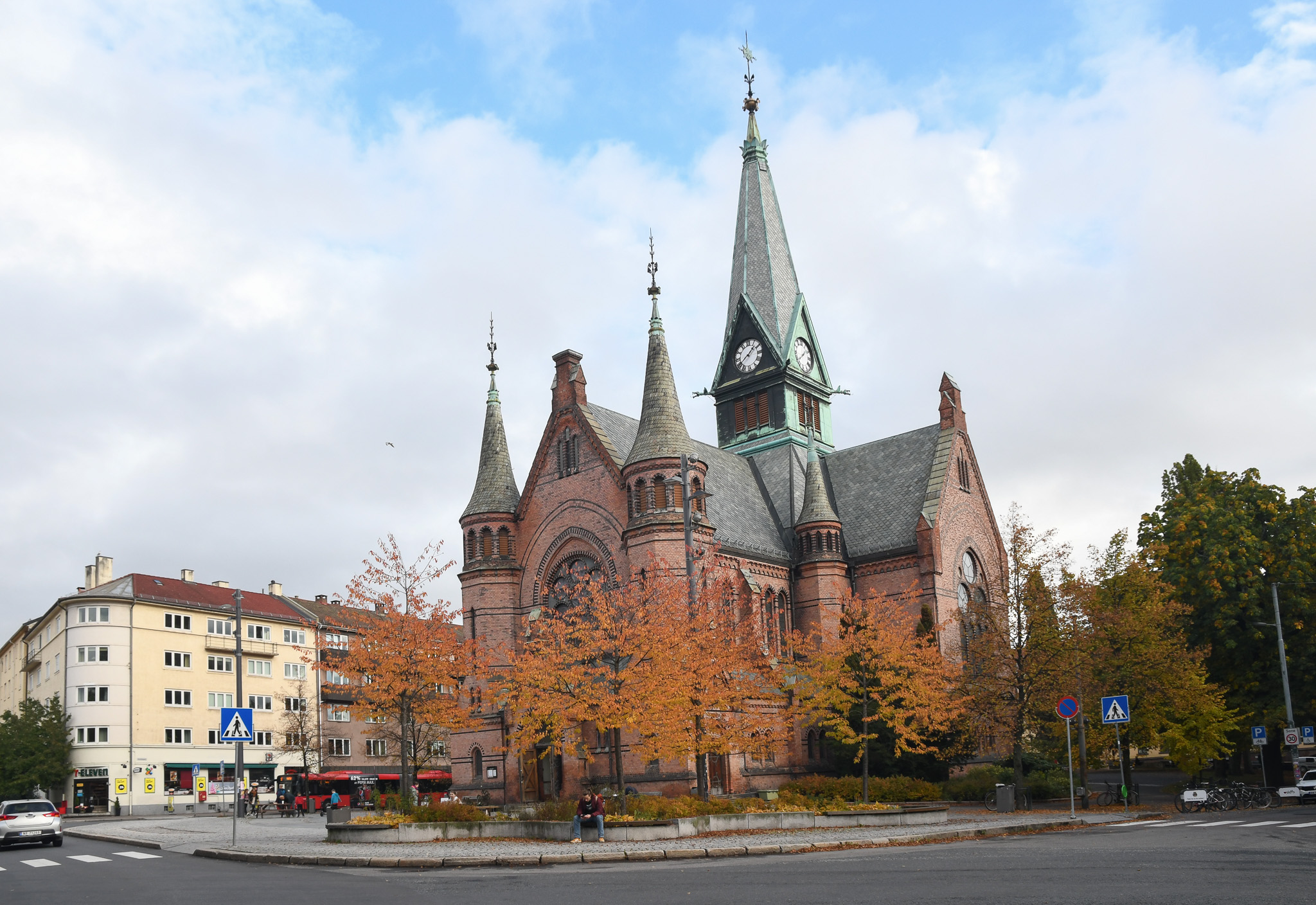
October 2019

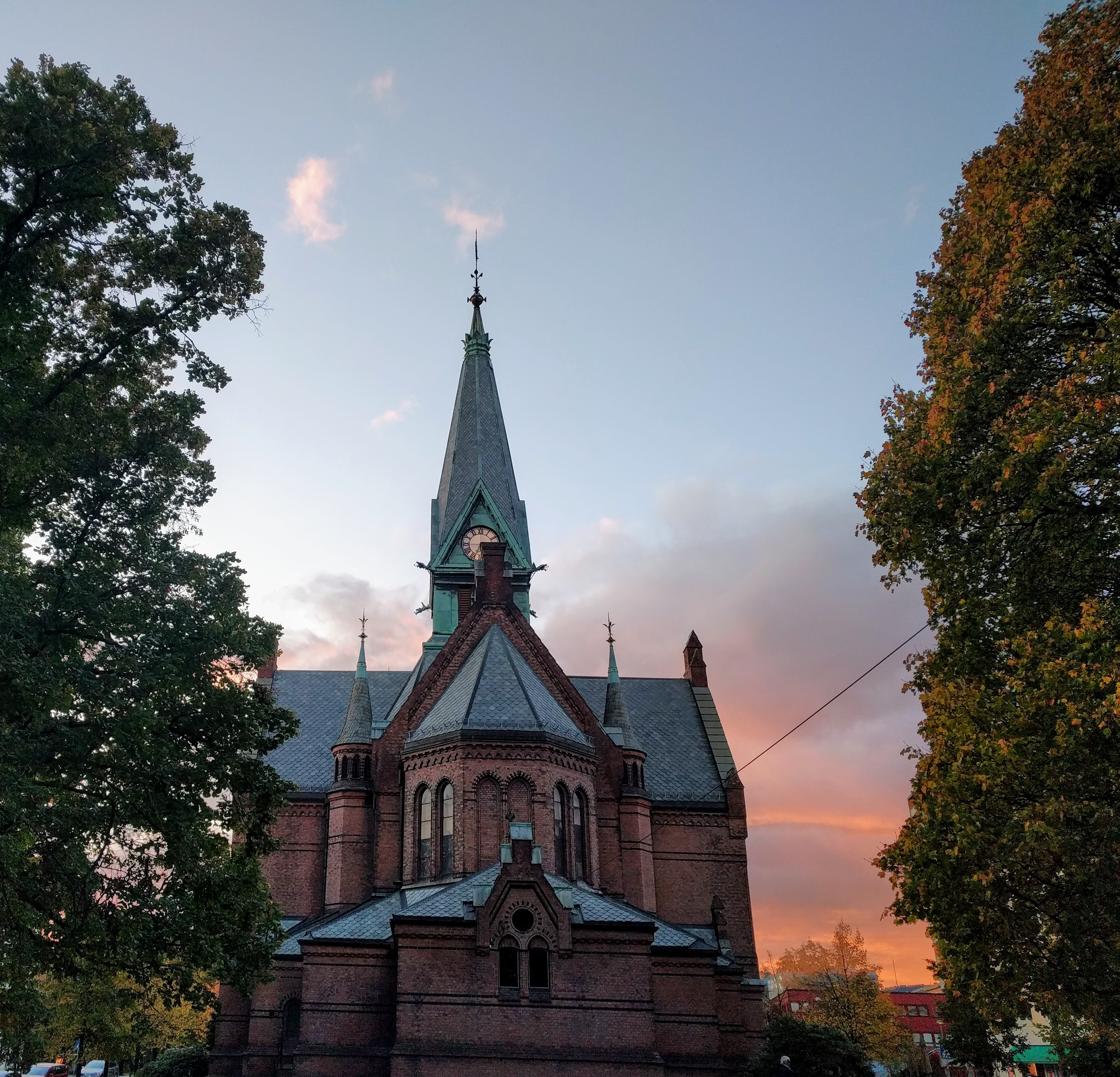
October 2017
