= Christian Fürst =

Norwegian architect (1860–1910)

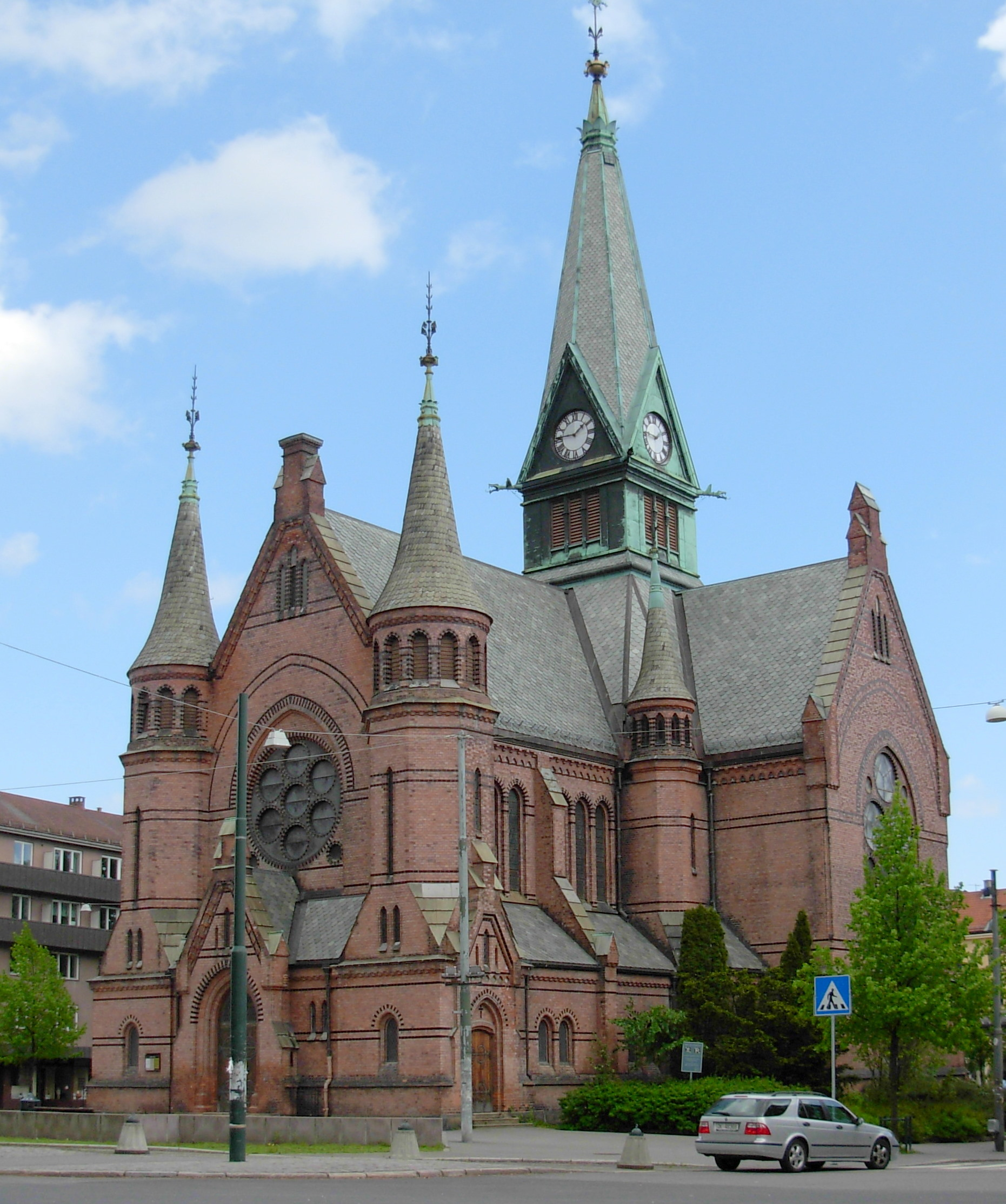
Sagene church

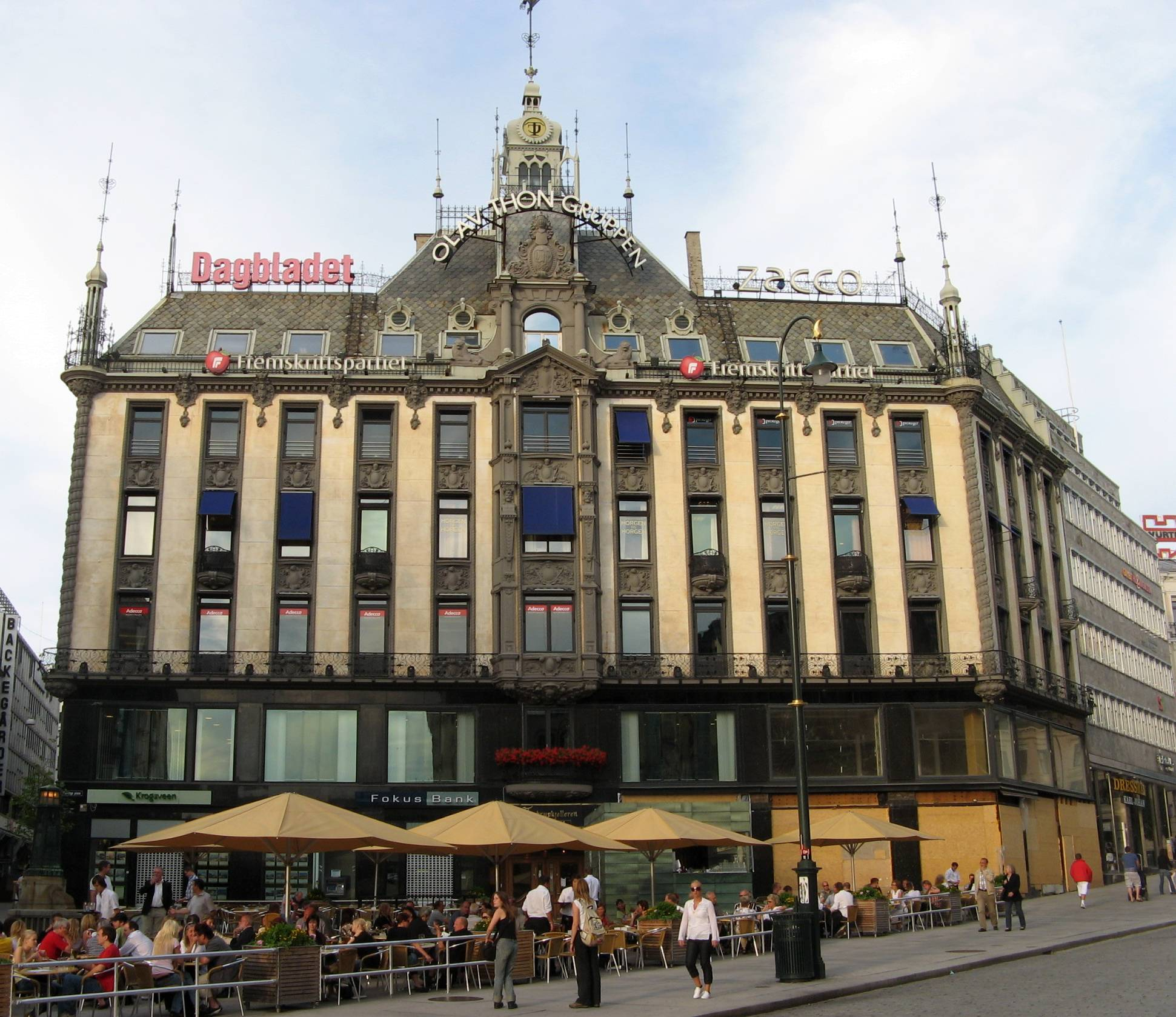
Tostrupgården

Christian Fürst (15 April 1860 - 8 January 1910) was a Norwegian architect.

== Personal life ==
Christian Fürst was a Norwegian architect, born in Christiania (now Oslo), Norway on April 15, 1860, and died on 8 January in 1910. He lived in Norway throughout his entire life (except when studying abroad) and was responsible for designing at least four buildings. He was born to Hans Siegwardt Fürst (1826–94) and Anna Catherine Thalette Backer (1834–1921). One of three brothers, Valentin Fürst Sr. (1870–1961), and Hans Siegwardt Backer Fürst (1877–1945), Christian Fürst joined his brother Hans in the business of architecture. During this period Norway was poverty-stricken and undergoing much turmoil in relation to territory and independence lost to Denmark. Lutheran Christianity had just made its shift in beliefs toward Pietism over the area and this influenced many. This also marked a period when many Norwegians emigrated outside of their country. Through his older brother Valentin Fürst Sr., he was an uncle of film director Walter Fyrst (1901–1993) and physician Valentin Fürst Jr.

== Career ==
Fürst attended Kristiania Technical School, now known as Oslo University College, in addition to the Technische Hochschule in Charlottenburg (now Technische Universität Berlin) and graduated in 1882. He was an assistant to professor Johannes Otzen, a well known German Architect known for his gothic style of buildings. He assisted Otzen up until 1885. After living in Kristiania for a while, Fürst decided to return to Berlin and attended the Academy of the Arts (Königliche Akademie der Künste zu Berlin) from 1889 to 1891. It was common for Norwegian scholars to go and study in major cities like Berlin to escape the impoverished areas of Norway. He was also an assistant of architect Paul Wallot until 1892, when he returned to Norway. He opened an architectural firm in Kristiania in 1896. His brother, Hans Backer Fürst, became a partner in 1902.

== Style ==
Fürst's style of architecture can be notably characterized under the term, “gothic”. This style of architecture arose primarily in the Middle Ages during the Renaissance era and was symbolically representative of Christianity. One would see a large building with pointed spikes and decorative finishing and associate it with the church. Fürst, however, started his career in architecture about a century after the renaissance had ended, and he had the idea of incorporating the gothic style into buildings other than churches. He is one of the many architects of this period responsible for bringing the gothic style to Scandinavia from its origin in southern Europe.

A good example of this would be his business palace, “Tostrupgården”. This large elaborate building was primarily constructed out of marble, and resembled much of the gothic style buildings from the renaissance. Another one of his notable works was actually a church, the Sagene Church, located in Oslo, constructed in 1891. Norway in the 1800s was a very Christian country, thus explaining some of the influence behind Fürst's work. His designs incorporated many of the notable gothic design features like flying buttresses, pointed arches, and large ornate windows.

Among his notable works are Trinity Church (Trefoldighetskirken) in Arendal and Sagene Church in Oslo. Tostrupgården, a monumental business property on Karl Johans Gate in Oslo, was built 1896–1898 in a cooperation with Waldemar Hansteen and Torolf Prytz. He also participated in the rebuilding of Ålesund following the 1904 Ålesund Fire.
