= Timeline of transport in Oslo =

Timeline of transport in Oslo covers key incidents within transport in Oslo, the capital of Norway.

The first railway opened in 1854, the first horsecar tramway in 1875 and the rapid transit system in 1966.

Year	Date	Event	Ref
1854	September 1	Hoved Line, Norway's first railway from Oslo Ø to Eidsvoll opened.	
1872	October 7	The Drammen Line and Oslo Vestbanestasjon opened.	
1874	August 26	Kristiania Sporveisselskap established.	
1875	October 10	The first horsecar line opened, from Homansbyen and Vestbanen via Stortovet to Oslo and Grünerløkka.	
1878	December 2	The tram line to Oslo extended to St. Hallvards plass.	
1879	January 2	The Østfold Line opened to Halden.	
1879	April 12	The Grünerløkka Line extended to Bayerbrua.	
1879	May 5	The tram line to Vestbanen extended to Munkedamsveien.	
1894	March 3	Kristiania Elektriske Sporvei started operations with an electric tram line from Østbanen via Briskeby to Majorstuen, as well as a branch line from Parkveien to Skillebekk.	
1894	December 31	The Skillebekk Line (today the Skøyen Line) extended to Nobels gate.	
1898	May 31	The Holmenkoll Line opened from Besserud to Majorstuen.	
1899	November 24	Kristiania Kommunale Sporveie opened their first tram line, to Sagene.	
1900	January 15	Electrification of the tram lines concluded.	
1900	March 27	The tram line to Rodeløkka opened.	
1900	August 28	The tram line from Tollbugata to Festningsbryggen opened.	
1900	December 12	The North Line, later renamed Gjøvik Line, opened from Grefsen to Jaren.	
1901	January 20	The Alnabru–Grefsen Line opened.	
1901		The Skillebekk Line extended to Thune.	
1902	November 28	The North Line extended from Grefsen to Oslo Ø.	
1902	November 28	The Grünerløkka Line extended to Grefsen.	
1902		The Frogner Line opened from Østbanen to Frogner Plass.	
1903	June 21	The Skøyen Line extended to Skøyen.	
1903	October 1	Lillestrøm–Bryn on the Hoved Line rebuilt to double track.	
1904	September 1	Bryn – Oslo Ø rebuilt to double track.	
1905		Kristiania Kommunale Sporveie taken over by Kristania Sporveisselskab.	
1907	May 1	Loenga–Alnabru Line opened.	
1907	November 13	Oslo Port Line opened, connecting Oslo Ø with Oslo V.	
1909		Tram lines start being numbered.	
1912	November 7	The Smestad Line opened to Smestad.	
1914	May 15	The Frogner Line extended to Majorstuen.	
1916	May 16	The Holmenkoll Line extended to Tryvann.	
1917	June 11	The Ekeberg Line opened to Sæter.	
1917		The municipal owned AS Akersbanrene established.	
1919	May 9	The suburban Lilleaker Line opened from Skøyen to Lilleaker.	
1922	November 26	Oslo V – Sandvika on the Drammen Line rebuilt to double track and electrified.	
1923	December 18	The Østensjø Line opened from Vålerenga to Bryn.	
1924	January 1	The Municipality of Oslo takes over the running of the two streetcar companies, creating Kristiania Sporveier.	
1924	June 1	Bekkelaget–Ljan rebuilt to double track.	
1924	July 1	The Lilleaker Line extended to Bekkestua.	
1924	November 2	The Lilleaker Line extended to Haslum.	
1924		AS Ekebergbanen starts operating the first bus lines.	
1925	January 1	Kristiania changed its name to Oslo, and Kristiania Sporveier its name to Oslo Sporveier.	
1926	January 10	The Østensjø Line extended to Oppsal.	
1927	September 1	The Hoved Line electrified.	
1927		Oslo Sporveier starts bus operations.	
1928	June 27	The Holmenkoll Line is extended to the underground Nationaltheatret as the first Nordic underground railway.	
1928	October 15	Loenga–Alnabru electrified.	
1929	May 15	Oslø Ø – Bekkelaget rebuilt to double track.	
1930	January 1	The Lilleaker Line extended to Kolsås.	
1931	September 30	The Simensbråten Line opened, branching off from the Ekeberg Line at Jomfrubråten to Simensbråten.	
1934	October 10	The Sognsvann Line opened.	
1935	January 24	The Smestad Line extended to Røa, and changes name to the Røa Line.	
1936	December 9	Oslo Ø – Ljan electrified.	
1936	December 15	Ljan–Kolbotn rebuilt to double track.	
1937	January 4	The Østensjø Line taken over by AS Bærumsbanen.	
1937	January 18	Ljan–Kolbotn electrified.	
1940	December 17	The first line of the Oslo trolleybus opened.	
1941	September 17	The Ekeberg Line extended to Ljabru.	
1942	June 15	The Kolsås Line trams reroute via Majorstuen to Nationaltheatret, with the opening of the Kolsås Line from Jar to Smestad.	
1948		The municipalities of Oslo and Aker merge.	
1948	December 22	The Røa Line extended to Grini.	
1949	January 17	The Kongsvoll Line closed.	
1949	February 6	The Rodeløkka Line closed.	
1951	December 3	The Røa Line extended to Lijordet.	
1954		The city council decides to build the Oslo T-bane rapid transit.	
1955	January 2	A new line to Rodeløkka opened.	
1957	April 28	The Lambertseter Line opened.	
1957	November 3	A tram line connection between Grefsen and Sinsen opened.	
1958	July 20	The Østensjø Line extended to Bøler.	
1958	July 20	The tram network was at its greatest extent.	
1960	October 30	The Ekeberg Line moved from Grønland to Schweigaards gate.	
1960		The city council decides to terminate the trolleybus and tram services, and replace them with rapid transit and diesel buses.	
1961	February 1	Oslo Ø – Tøyen rebuilt to double track.	
1961	February 1	Oslo Ø – Jaren electrified.	
1961	April 23	The Rodeløkka Line closed.	
1961	November 12	The first trolleybus line closes.	
1962	May 27	Tøyen–Grefsen rebuilt to double track.	
1966	May 22	The Oslo Metro opened with the Lambertseter Line converted to rapid transit.	
1966	October 16	The Grorud Line to Grorud opened as part of the metro.	
1967	October 29	The Østensjø Line became part of the metro.	
1967	October 29	The Simensbråten Line closed.	
1967	November 26	The Østensjø Line extended to Skullerud.	
1968	June 24	The official closing of the trolleybus service.	
1970	November 18	The Furuset Line opened as part of the metro to Haugerud.	
1972	November 16	The Røa Line extended to Østerås.	
1974	March 3	The Grorud Line extended to Rommen.	
1974	June 26	Stor-Oslo Lokaltrafikk established to manage bus routes in Akershus, and from Akershus to Oslo.	
1974	August 18	The Grorud Line extended to Stovner.	
1974	December 15	The Furuset Line extended to Trosterud.	
1974		The last conductor on trams taken out of service.	
1975	December 21	The Grorud Line extended to Vestli.	
1977	January 9	The metro extended from Jernbanetorget to Sentrum.	
1977		The city council canceled the decision to close the tram lines.	
1978	February 19	The Furuset Line extended to Furuset.	
1980	June 1	The Oslo Tunnel opened.	
1981	November 8	The Furuset Line extended to Ellingsrudåsen.	
1981		First articulated buses into service.	
1982		The SL79 articulated trams put into service.	
1983	March 20	The metro line from Jernbanetorget to Sentrum closes due to leaks.	
1983		The Port Line closed.	
1986		Night buses entered service.	
1987	March 7	The Common Tunnel opens form Jernbanetorget to Nationaltheatret.	
1989	May 28	Oslo Vestbanestasjon closed.	
1989		Ticket machines enter service, with nine T-bane stations unstaffed.	
1991		First bus lines subject to public service obligation.	
1993		The first through T-bane route, connecting the Sognsvann Line with the Lambertseter Line.	
1995		The Røa Line becomes a through service with the eastern T-bane lines.	
1995		The Vika Line tram opened.	
1995		T2000 multiple units into service on the T-bane.	
1997	November 24	The Østensjø Line extended to Mortensrud.	
1998	January 5	The Oslo Bus Terminal opened.	
1998	October 8	The Gardermoen Line opened.	
1999	June 1	The Ullevål Hageby Line extended to Rikshospitalet.	
1999	August 22	Romerike Tunnel opened.	
1999	December 16	Nationaltheatret Station rebuilt to four platforms.	
2000		SL95 trams into service.	
2002		Student discount introduced on public transport.	
2003	July 1	Oslo Sporvognsdrift and Oslo T-banedrift took over operation of the trams and T-bane.	
2003	August 20	The Ring Line opened to Storo.	
2006	January 25	MX3000 multiple units into service on the T-bane.	
2006	July 1	Oslo Sporveier split into Oslo Public Transport Administration and Kollektivtransportproduksjon.	
2006	August 20	The Circle Line opened from Storo via Sinsen til Carl Berners Plass.	
2008	January 1	Ruter took over as public transport administrator in Oslo and Akershus.	
2010	December 6	Holmenkollen line partially converted to metro standard, Holmenkollen station rebuilt to accommodate 6-car trains.	
2011	August 17	Kolsås Line Bekkestua station opened as a part of the renovation of the Kolsås Line.	
2012	October 8	Kolsås Line Gjønnes station re-opened after renovation.	
2013	December 15	Kolsås Line Haslum and Avløs stations re-opened, making Avløs the terminus of the Kolsås Line. The line is extended by bus to Kolsås. Bus 142 from Bekkestua now starts and terminates each travel on Kolsås, looping at Avløs.	

== See also ==
- Timeline of Oslo
