= History of the Oslo Tramway and Metro =

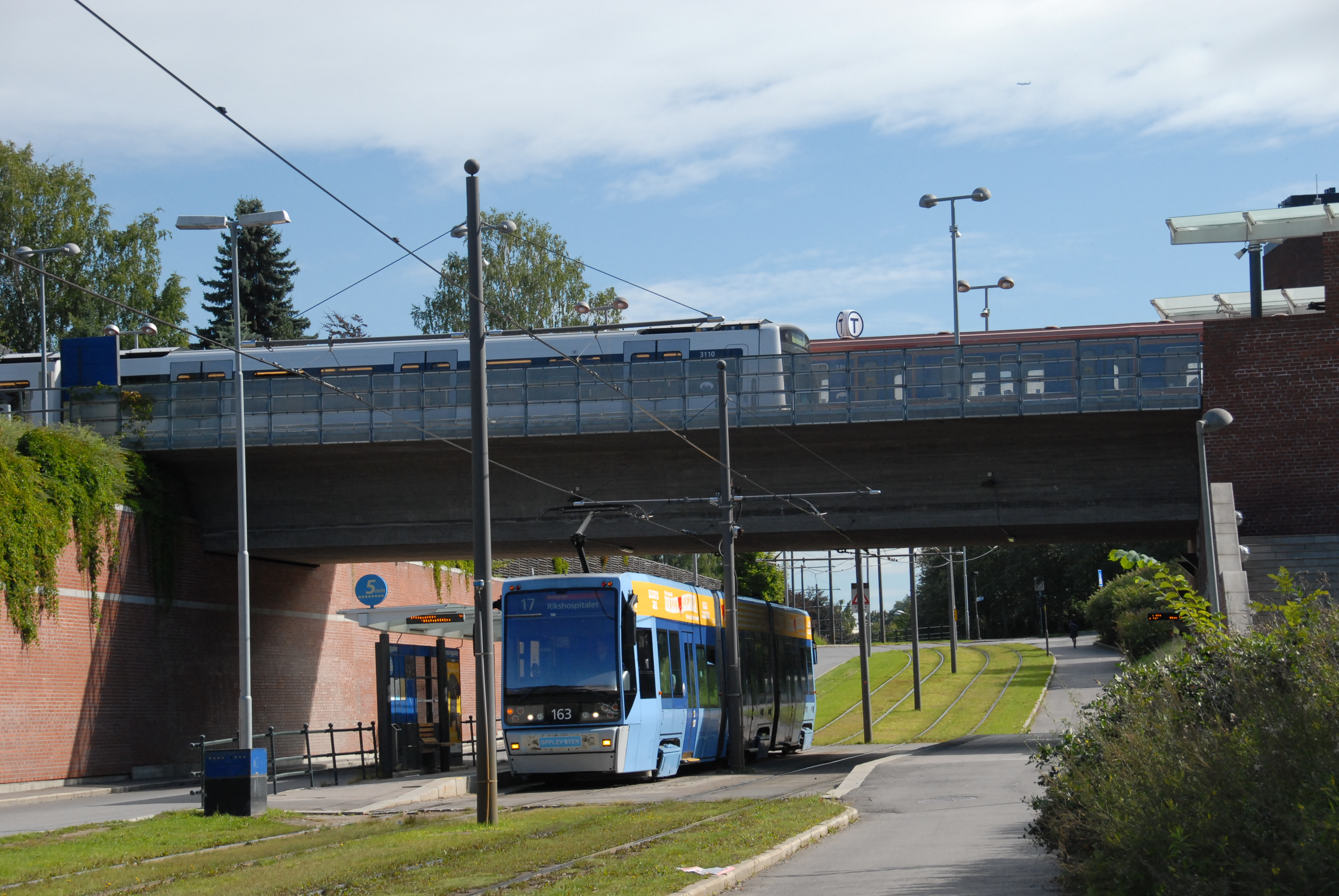
SL95 tram and MX3000 Metro train meet at Forskningsparken

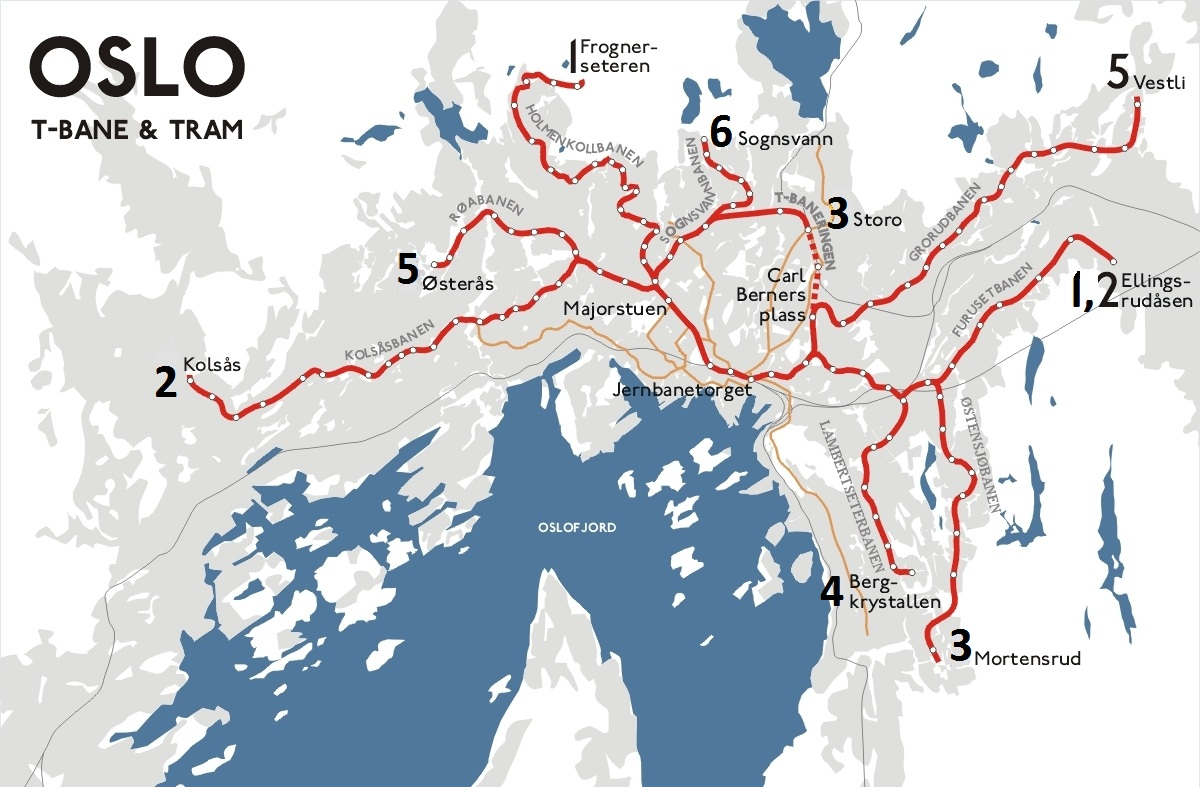
Map of the Metro (red), tramway (orange) and mainline railway (black)

Map showing the Oslo Tramway in 1939

The history of the Oslo Tramway and Oslo Metro in Oslo (Kristiania until 1925), Norway, starts in 1875, when Kristiania Sporveisselskab (KSS) opened two horsecar lines through the city centre. In 1894, Kristiania Elektriske Sporvei (KES) built the first electric street tramways, which ran west from the city centre. Within six years, all tramways were electric. The city council established Kristiania Kommunale Sporveie (KKS) in 1899, which built three lines before it was sold to KSS six years later. Both KSS and KES were taken over by the municipality in 1924, becoming Oslo Sporveier. The company gradually expanded the city tram network, which reached its peak length in 1939.

The Holmenkollen Line was the first light rail line, which opened in 1898 and ran west of the city. Later light rail lines in the west were the Røa Line (opened in 1912), the Lilleaker Line (1919), the Sognsvann Line (1934) and the Kolsås Line (1942). From 1928, they ran to the city centre via the Common Tunnel. East of the city, the Ekeberg Line opened in 1917, followed by the Østensjø Line (opened in 1926) and the Lambertseter Line (1957). The light rail lines were built by three private companies, Holmenkolbanen, Ekebergbanen and Bærumsbanen. By 1975, all had been bought by Oslo Sporveier.

The Oslo Metro opened in 1966, consisting of a line through the Common Tunnel to Jernbanetorget and the upgraded Lambertseter light rail line. The same year the Grorud Line opened. The next year the Østensjø Line was connected, and in 1970 the Furuset Line opened. The city council decided to close the tramways in 1960, and several lines were closed until the decision was revoked in 1977. In 1987, the Common Tunnel was completed. From 1993, the western lines were upgraded and connected to the Metro, allowing Metro trains to run through the city centre. The Metro's Ring Line was completed in 2006.

== Street trams ==
=== Horsecars ===
The first attempt to introduce horsecar operations in Oslo (at the time called Christiania) were in 1868, when the engineer Jens Theodor Pauldan Vogt and the architect Paul Due applied for a concession. The application was rejected because the city council felt that the streets were too narrow. They made a second application in April 1874, and this time permission was granted. On 26 August 1874, Vogt and Due established Christiania Sporveisselskab ("Christiania Tramway Company"). Twenty-two 4.1-metre (13 ft) long cars were delivered from the United States manufacturer John Stephenson Company, arriving in Christiania on 31 August 1875. The official opening took place on 6 October 1875. In 1879, the city and company changed the spelling of the name "Christiania" to "Kristiania".

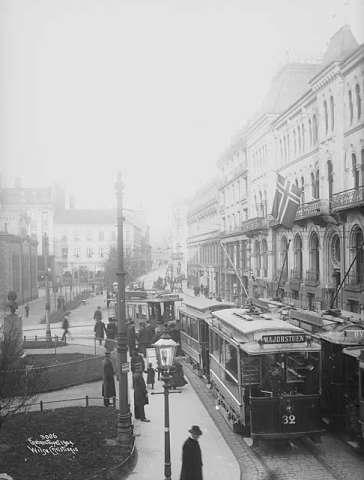
Trams at Athenum in 1904

The system initially had four standard gauge, single tracked lines, which had passing loops to allow trams to pass. Three originated at Stortorvet: the Gamlebyen Line, running east to Gamlebyen (now Old Oslo, but then called just Oslo); the Vestbanen Line, which ran west to Vestbanen station (Oslo West station); and the Ullevål Hageby Line, which ran west to Homansbyen, where the depot was located. In addition, there was a short connecting line between the Ullevål Hageby Line and the Vestbanen Line, but it was closed on 19 October 1875. The two lines that connected to the station only ran services that corresponded with train arrivals and departures; the other two lines had fixed fifteen-minute headway—decreasing to ten minutes from 22 June 1876. During the winter of 1875 and 1876, the company attempted to use sleds instead of wagons. They took delivery of seventeen units, but these were not as suitable as the wagons and the company instead chose to salt the rail tracks.

Profits were made immediately, and in 1877 an additional seven cars were delivered. The following year, a new line from Stortorvet to Grünerløkka was built—the start of the Grünerløkka–Torshov Line—along with a new depot. The Gamlebyen Line was extended to St Halvards plass on 2 December 1878, the Grünerløkka Line to Thorvald Meyers gate on 12 April 1879 and the Vestbanen Line to Munkedamsveien on 5 May 1879. The following year, the lines were merged to two through services: Homansbyen–Oslo and Vestbanen–Grünerløkka. After this, the company concentrated its investments into rebuilding the system to double track. Between 1887 and 1892, the company took delivery of 14 additional cars from Skabo Jernbanevognfabrikk, the same length as the Stephenson cars. The last horsecar delivery was 15 cars from Falkenried in 1897, which were designed so they could be converted to electric tram trailers. They were 6.6 metres (22 ft) long and remained in service until 1939. In 1880, Kristiania Sporveisselskab registered a ridership of 1,499,000 passengers.

=== Electrification ===
The horsecar system was more expensive to operate than electric trams, and Christiania (later Kristiania) Elektriske Sporvei ("Kristiania Electric Tramway") was founded to establish an electric tram service. The initiative came from the engineers H. E. Heyerdahl, A. Fenger-Krog and consul L. Samson. KSS immediately attempted to buy the company, but the purchase failed. On 2 March 1894, the Briskeby Line opened, which ran westwards from the Østbanen station (Oslo East station) via the city centre and Briskeby to Majorstuen, using a 600 volt supply. At the same time, a branch line opened from the Briskeby Line at Slottsparken, heading further west to Skillebekk. At first a shuttle service was provided on the branch line, but by April a through service was offered to Østbanen station. The branch line was extended to Nobels gate on 31 December 1894, to Thune in 1901 and to Skøyen station on 21 June 1903 and is now known as the Skøyen Line.

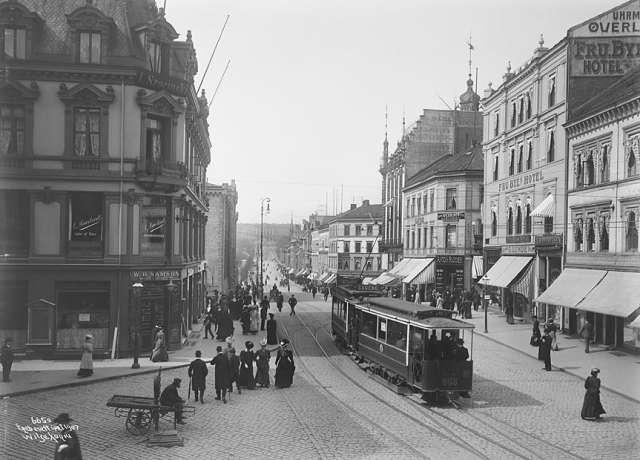
Tram at Carl Johans Gate and Egertorget in 1907

The last street line built by KES was the Frogner Line, which opened in 1902 from Solli plass on the Skøyen Line to Frogner plass. It was extended to Majorstuen, where the depot was located, on 15 May 1914. From 1909, KES introduced numbered services, with the Briskeby Line numbered 1, the Frogner Line numbered 2 and the Skøyen Line numbered 3. KES bought 78 motorized cars and 66 unmotorized trailers; of which 20 cars were later rebuilt to trailers. The main manufacturers were Herbrand, Falkenried and Skabo, who delivering a continual stream of stock to the company until 1914. From then until 1925, there was sufficient rolling stock that only ten more vehicles were delivered.

KSS decided to convert its lines to electric traction as well. The first electric trams ran on 29 September 1899, and the conversion was completed by 15 January 1900. At the time of electrification, KSS had 57 horsecars; 38 of these were later converted to trailers, while 19 were decommissioned. The John Stephenson and Skabo trailers were taken out of service in 1917–18, and sixteen of these were sold to the Bergen Tramway and Trondheim Tramway—the latter rebuilding them to meter gauge. One of the original Stephenson cars has been preserved at the Oslo Tramway Museum.

The Vestbanen Line was extended west from Vestbanen station towards Skillebekk in two stages, on 21 December 1898 and again on 23 June 1899. The Gamlebyen Line was extended further east on 17 November 1899 to Oslo Hospital. The Vålerenga Line, which ran east from the city centre, opened on 3 May 1900, and the Kampen Line, which ran parallel but further north, on 6 June 1900. The first street line out of Kristiania into Aker was opened in three stages as an extension of the Grünerløkka–Torshov Line: on 29 September 1899 to Torshov, on 2 October 1901 to Sandaker and, finally, to Grefsen Station on 28 November 1902. For the electrification, KSS ordered 47 new trams from Falkenried and Waggonfabrik Linke-Hoffmann; these remained in service until 1967. In 1900, the tramway had a ridership of almost 17 million passengers, or 75 trips per inhabitant.

=== First municipal trams ===
Since both tram companies were profitable, the city council decided to start another service—Kristiania Kommunale Sporveie (KKS, "Kristiania Municipal Tramways")—the first municipally owned tram operator in Norway. Sagene Ring was the first line, which opened on 24 November 1899 from Sagene to Akersgata, where there was a connection onwards to Østbanen station using KES tracks. On 26 January 1901, a connection line was built from Tollbugaten to Kirkeristen in the city centre to avoid running on KES tracks.

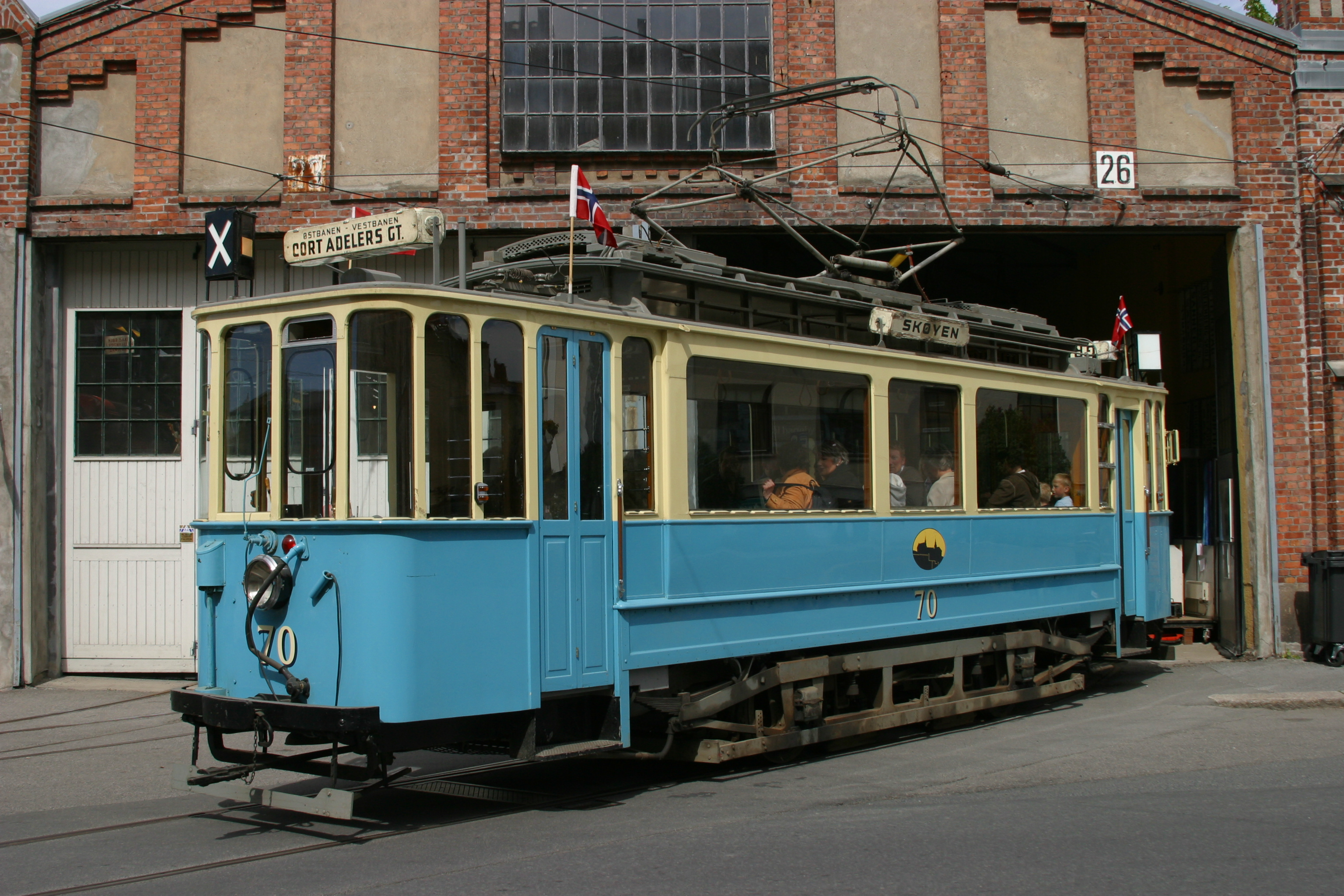
Heritage tram no. 70 in Oslo Sporveier livery that was inherited from KSS.

A second KKS line was opened on 27 March 1900, from Nybrua, located on the KSS's Grünerløkka–Torshov Line, via Trondheimsveien to Rodeløkka. Named the Rodeløkka Line, the southern section would later become part of the Sinsen Line. From Nybrua to the city centre, KSS track was used. The depot was located at Rodeløkka. A third line opened on 28 August 1900, from Tollbugaten in the city centre southwards to Festningsbryggen at Vippetangen—the Vippetangen Line. Again, KSS track was needed to connect the line into the city centre. Twenty cars and twelve trailers were bought from Busch with electric components delivered from Schuk—stock that remained in service until 1967. The company failed to make any profits, and was sold to KSS in 1905.

=== Consolidation ===
After the take-over in 1905, KSS was operating seven routes: Homansbyen–Oslo, Homansbyen–Sannergata, Munkedamsveien–Sannergata–Grefsen, Munkedamsveien–Vålerenga, Sagene – St. Hanshaugen – Kampen, St. Hanshaugen – Rodeløkka and Stortorvet–Vippetangen. KSS extended the Vippetangen Line on 8 November 1905, and opened an extension from Homansbyen to Adamstuen on 24 September 1909. KSS and KES agreed to link their two networks, and a connecting line opened on 1 May 1912 between Homansbyen and Rosenborg station on KES's Line 1. An extension of the Vestbanen Line to Skillebekk was finished on 2 November 1911.

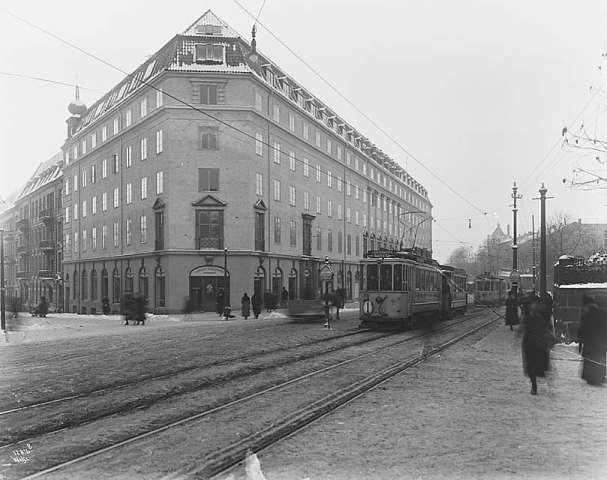
KES tram on the Skøyen Line in 1919

This expansion caused the need for more rolling stock, and KSS took delivery of 42 trams from Falkenried and Skabo between 1912 and 1914. At 10.5 metres (34 ft) long they were somewhat longer than the other trams. The new lines allowed the two companies to operate on each other's lines, and they introduced a common numbering scheme for the services. Several of the lines were serviced by two numbered routes, a system that remains in use today. From 1912, a number of additional connections were built between the KES and KSS networks, and the two companies started cooperating on certain lines. From 1921 to 1923, KSS bought an additional 22 trams from Hannoversche Waggonfabrik, Brill and Busch, commonly referred to as the HaWa Class. KSS had an annual ridership of almost 60 million in 1922.

== Light rail ==
=== Holmenkolbanen ===
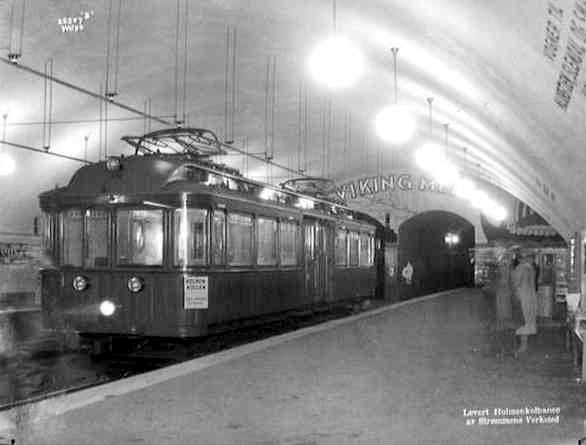
Holmenkollen Line tram at Nationaltheatret in 1928

Holmenkolbanen ("The Holmenkollen Line") opened the city's first suburban light rail line, the Holmenkollen Line, in 1898. It ran 6.5 kilometres (4.0 mi) from Majorstuen station northwestwards via 12 stations to Besserud station. Like all the later light rail lines, these were electric trams with a grade-separated right-of-way and proper stations instead of tram stops. Unlike the other suburban tram lines that were built later, the Holmenkollen Line was not extended into the city using on-street tracks. Instead, passengers had to change at Majorstuen station to KES streetcars. In 1909, the Holmenkollen Line started using 3.1-metre (10 ft) wide suburban stock, when it replaced its original 1898 Class trams with 1909 Class stock. The 2.1-kilometre (1.3 mi) long Smestad Line opened in 1912 as a two station branch line from Majorstuen to Smestad station south of the Holmenkollen Line. In 1916, the Holmenkollen Line was extended 5.2 kilometres (3.2 mi) from Besserud northwards to Tryvann with six new stations. The last part, from Frognerseteren station to Tryvann, which was single track and used for freight was demolished in 1939.

In 1912, Holmenkolbanen started construction of a 2.0-kilometre (1.2 mi) long tunnel from Majorstuen station to Nationaltheatret station, with an intermediate Valkyrie Plass station. This was the first part of the Common Tunnel and was blasted through the rock beneath the city. The extension was planned to give the two suburban lines access to the central business district of Oslo, but high construction costs and difficult geological conditions prevented the extension from opening until 1928. The tunneling caused the company financial difficulties, resulting in the Smestad Line being sold to Akersbanerne, owned by Aker Municipality. In 1922, Holmenkolbanen started building the Sognsvann Line, although it took twelve years to complete it. The 6.0-kilometre (3.7 mi) long line ran north from Majorstuen station to Sognsvann station with 11 new stations. The Smestad Line was extended 2.8 kilometres (1.7 mi) to Røa station in 1935 with six new stations and was renamed Røa Line.

=== Ekeberg Line ===
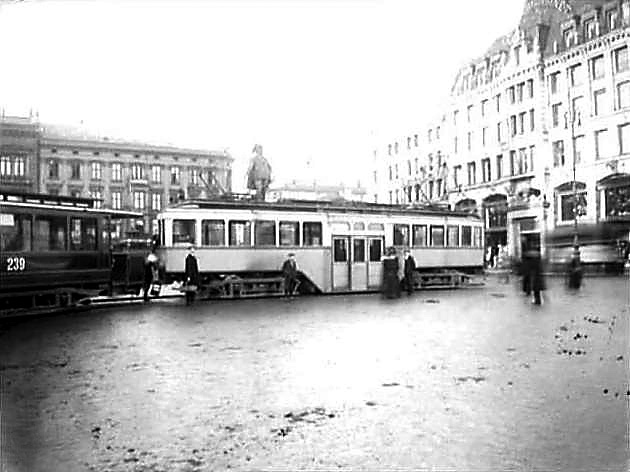
Ekeberg trams at Stortorvet in the city centre in 1918

The Ekebergbanen ("The Ekeberg Line") was incorporated in 1913, and the following year construction started on the single tracked Ekeberg Line. It opened on 11 June 1917, running 6.6 kilometres (4.1 mi) southwards from Oslo Hospital station via six other stations to Sæter station. The company had made an agreement with KSS to use the Gamlebyen Line to Stortorvet, but chose to electrify the Ekeberg Line using 1,200 volts. In 1924, Ekebergbanen started operating adjacent bus lines, the first in Oslo. On 30 September 1931, the 1.3-kilometre (0.81 mi) long Simensbråten Line was opened with three stations as a branch from Jomfrubråten station to Simensbråten station. It was operated as a shuttle service outside rush hour; during peak hours a direct service was provided to Stortorvet. Part of the main line was double-tracked from Sjømannskolen station to Kastellet station in 1931, to Bråten station in 1940 and to Sæter station in 1946. The line was extended from Sæter to Ljabru station on 17 September 1941, but the extension remained single track until 1967.

=== Lilleaker Line ===
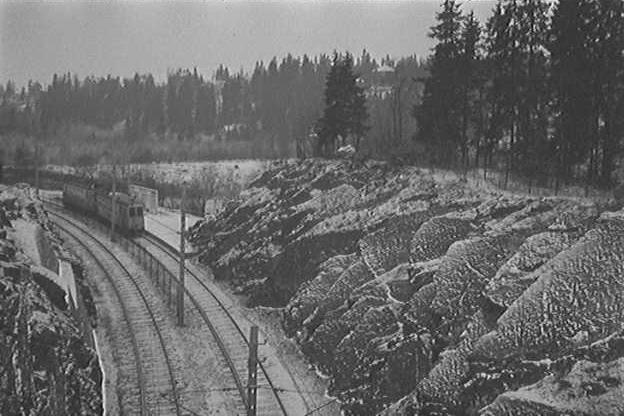
Jar station on the Lilleaker Line in 1935

The success of the light rail lines tempted KES to extend the Skøyen Line west from Skøyen as a suburban line. The Lilleaker Line opened to Lilleaker station on 9 May 1919, to Avløs station in 1924 and to Kolsås station in 1930. The section west of Jar station is located in the municipality of Bærum in Akershus. A new branch section from Jar station to Sørbyhaugen station opened in 1942, connecting the Jar—Kolsås Line to Nationaltheatret station. The Jar—Kolsås Line was upgraded and the stock was replaced with wider suburban trams. Kolsås station is 16.7 kilometres (10.4 mi) from Nationaltheatret station.

=== Akersbanerne ===
Before its 1948 merger with the city of Oslo, Aker was a municipality which surrounded Oslo on all sides. Akersbanerne ("The Aker Lines") was founded on 7 June 1917 by Aker Municipality to coordinate the construction of a new light rail line from Kristiania to new suburbs in Aker. The company planned to build several lines from the ends of the street tramways and extend them on grade-separated rights-of-way. Construction of the Østensjø Line started in 1922 and opened from Vålerenga eastwards to Bryn on 18 December 1923, and to Oppsal on 10 January 1926. For the first three years, street trams operated by KSS, and later Oslo Sporveier, ran the 1.5-kilometre (0.93 mi) route to Bryn. After the full line opened, spanning another 3.2 kilometres (2.0 mi), Akersbanerne could not reach agreement with Oslo Sporveier, owned by Oslo Municipality. It was not until 1937 that direct services to the city centre were provided via the Vålerenga Line.

== Second World War ==
The tramways of Oslo experienced a higher ridership and several sabotage actions during the Second World War. During the "April Days of 1940", rumour had it that Oslo was going to be bombed, and the tram service was therefore stopped for half an hour that day. Later, on 19 December 1943, an explosion at the ammunition supply at Filipstad caused a total stop of tramway service from 14:30 a.m. A small explosion accident also took place at Vålerenga Depot in December 1944. On 31 December 1944, a tram was hit by an airbomb at Drammensveien (now Henrik Ibsens gate) next to the Palace Park, where all passengers but the conductor were killed.

Due to a low supply of petrol, bus traffic was replaced by electric tramways during the war. The trams experienced therefore an increase in ridership, from 64 million passengers per year in 1939 to 151 million in 1944. The three lines of Holmenkolbanen had together a ridership of 9.5 billion in 1939, 10.9 billions in 1940, 21 billions in 1943 and at the peak 22.6 billion passengers in 1945. In addition to the regular tram passenger services, Oslo Sporveier started to transport goods across the city in tram wagons.

The leadership of the tramway was transferred to the German occupiers, who printed tickets and signs with Nazi emblems on them. If a passenger "demonstrated" by changing his seat when seated next to a German officer, he was expelled at the next stop.

Except from damage to the rail tracks at Frøen caused by a bomb, the Oslo Metro experienced no sabotage actions.

== Municipalization ==
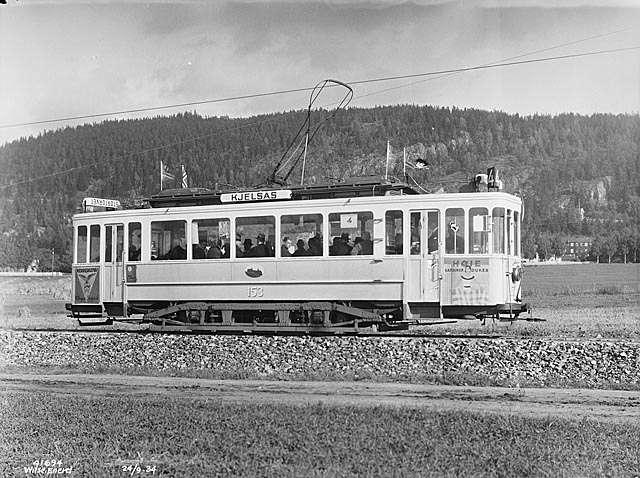
Kjelsås tram in 1934

The city had granted concessions to the two private tram companies until 1924, after which the city could expropriate the companies. Both companies were well run and highly profitable, and on 1 May 1924, KSS and KES were merged and taken over by the city council, which gave the new company the name Kristiania Sporveier ("Kristiania Tramways"). The municipality owned 51 per cent. On 1 January 1925, the city changed its name to Oslo, with the company's name also changing. The light rail lines operated by Holmenkolbanen and Ekebergbanen were not taken over, nor was the Lilleaker Line operated by KES; the city council did not want to take over tram lines in Aker. The Lilleaker Line operations of KES were transferred to the private company Bærumsbanen ("The Bærum Line").

After the take-over, Oslo Sporveier immediately started expanding the tram network. On 4 May 1924, the Korsvoll Line was opened as a branch of the Grünerløkka–Torshov Line from Torshov northwestwards to Bjølsen. On 1 August 1925, the Ullevål Hageby Line was extended from Adamstuen further north to Ullevål Hageby. The Kjelsås Line opened on 25 September 1934 and ran from Storo on the Grünerløkka–Torshov Line northwards to Kjelsås station. By 1934, the municipality had gained full ownership of Oslo Sporveier. The new company also decided to increase the permitted car width to 2.5 metres (8.2 ft), allowing wider suburban trams to run in the city streets. During the 1930s, Oslo Sporveier decided it needed more rolling stock, and cooperated with Strømmens Værksted to create the Gullfisk ("Goldfish") class. Forty-six units were delivered from 1937 to 1940. Built with an aluminium chassis, they were quick and light, with a distinct streamlined shape, making their back ends look like a goldfish tail. On 1939, the Sinsen Line was extended from Carl Berners plass northwards to Sinsen. At this point the city had its most extensive tram network.

Holmenkolbanen had built-up large debts in building the underground section to Nationaltheatret, including large amounts of compensation to house-owners who had their buildings damaged during construction. To finance their debt, the Akersbanerne-owned Smestad Line was transferred to Holmenkolbanen on 16 November 1933, with Akersbanerene taking over the majority of shares in Holmenkolbanen. The latter remained listed on the Oslo Stock Exchange. From 4 January 1937, Bærumsbanen took over the operation of trams on the Østensjø Line, though the ownership of the line remained with Akersbanerne. Oslo Sporveier started operating trolleybus lines from 1939. On 1 October 1944, Oslo Sporveier bought Bærumsbanen and took over the operation of the Lillaker and Østensjø Lines. On 1 January 1948, the municipalities of Oslo and Aker merged, and on 31 May 1949, the two municipally owned companies, Oslo Sporveier and Akersbanerne, merged, taking the name of Oslo Sporveier. The following year, Oslo Sporveier took over Ekebergbanen. In 1975, Oslo Sporveier bought all but a few of the shares in Holmenkolbanen, and at the same time took over operation of all the suburban lines.

=== Partial closing ===
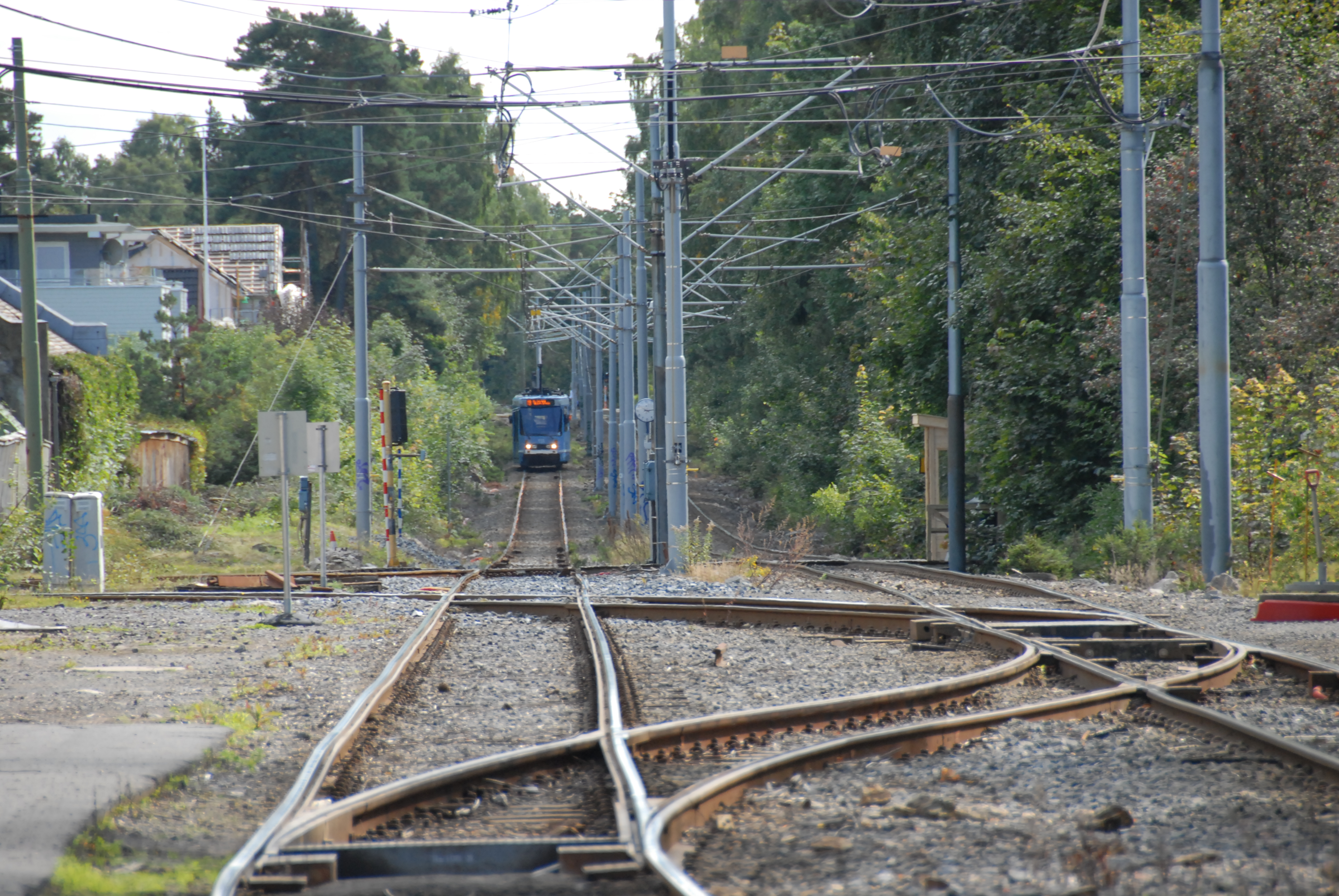
In 1960, the city council decided to close the whole tramway, including the Ekeberg Line

The Oslo Tramway had a ridership of 108 million passengers in 1948. On 17 January 1949, the Korsvoll Line became the first tram line to be closed. followed by the Rodeløkka Line on 6 February. The latter reopened following a new route on 2 January 1955. In 1960, with the deregulation of the sale of cars, cheap diesel and the decision to build the metro, the city council decided to close the tram and the trolleybus networks. Tracks would be kept and trams would run until they would be naturally retired. However, no major investments would be made in the lines or rolling stock. Within a year, the Kampen, Rodeløkka, Vippetangen, Simensbråten and Vestbanen Lines were closed, as were trolleybus lines 18 and 24. The remaining two trolleybus routes were closed in 1968. On 24 June 1968, Vålerenga Line was closed.

However, no further tram lines were closed. In 1969, the site of the turning loop at Sinsen needed to be moved to allow the construction of the Sinsen Interchange. Instead of closing the line, Oslo Sporveier chose to build a new loop at Muselunden at Sinsen. The Ekeberg Line was scheduled to close in 1972, because a new line needed to be built to allow passage during the construction of Oslo Central Station, which would replace the Østbanen. After heavy protests from Ekeberg residents, Oslo Sporveier chose to build a loop in Vognmannsgata in the city centre.

== Metro ==
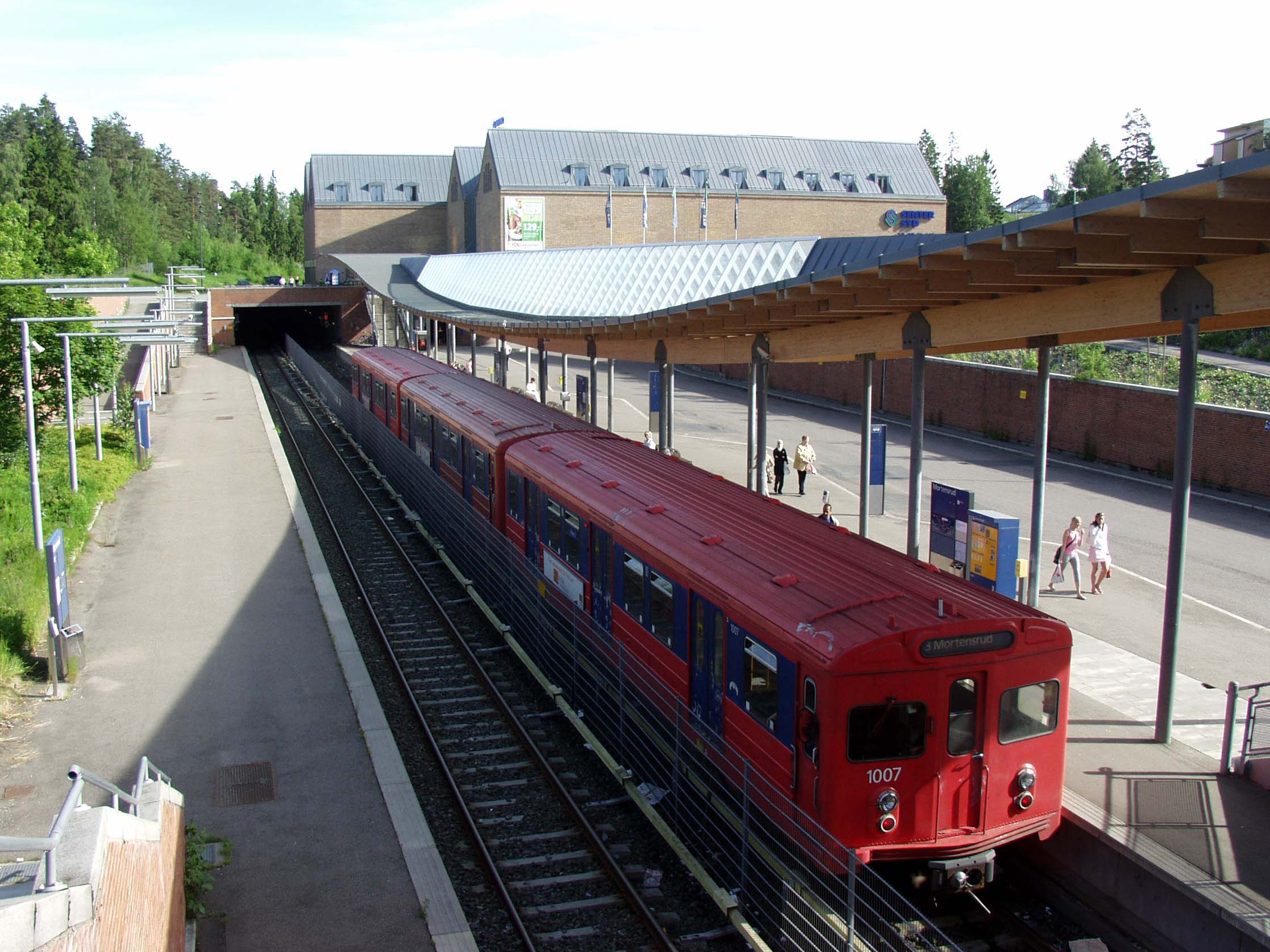
T1000s stock at the terminus Mortensrud on the Østensjø Line.

The city established the Metro Office on 15 September 1949, and the first plans were launched in 1951. In 1954, the city council decided to build the metro network with four branches in eastern Oslo; two would run on each side of the Grorud Valley, while two would run southwards through Nordstrand. These areas had all been chosen as new suburbs for Oslo, and needed a good public transport system to be put in place quickly. The system was to feature improvements over the light rail lines: a third rail power supply, cab signaling with automatic train protection, stations long enough for six-car trains and level crossings replaced by bridges and underpasses—specifications christened "metro standard" by Oslo Sporveier.

The Østensjø Line would be converted to metro standard, and three new lines would be built. The Lambertseter Line opened as a light rail line from Brynseng station, where it connected to the Vålerenga Line, to Bergkrystallen station on 28 April 1957. Originally it had overhead wires, low platforms and was served using trams. The Ekeberg Line would remain a tramway. The Lambertseter Line served the area located between the Ekeberg and Østensjø Lines. The Østensjø Line was extended to Bøler station in 1958.

Schematic of the Oslo Metro as of 2010. Six of the branches were originally built as light rail lines.

The Metro took delivery of T1000 trains from Strømmens Verksted. From 1964 to 1978, 162 cars were delivered for the eastern network. The metro opened on 22 May 1966, when the Common Tunnel opened from Brynseng station to Jernbanetorget station in the city centre, located beside the Østbanen. The same day, the Lambertseter Line was reopened after it had been upgraded to metro standard. On 16 October 1966, the then 9.2-kilometre (5.7 mi) and twelve station long Grorud Line, which ran northeast on the northern hillside of the Grorud Valley, opened to Grorud station. The Lambertseter Line was connected to the system in 1967, when the line was extended to Skullerud station.

The Furuset Line runs on the southern hillside of the Grorud Valley. It opened to Haugerud station in 1970, and was extended to Trosterud station in 1974. The same year, the Grorud Line was extended to Vestli station, which is 14.6 kilometres (9.1 mi) from Jernbanetorget. By 1981, the Furuset Line had reached Ellingsrudåsen station, which is 11.5 kilometres (7.1 mi) from Jernbanetorget. The western light rail lines took delivery of 33 T1300 train cars from 1978 to 1981, with an additional 16 converted from the existing T1000 cars. The T1300 cars differed in that they could run on both third rail and overhead wires. Although not connected to the metro, the western lines were gradually becoming more like the metro, although they retained overhead wires, a different signaling system and shorter platforms.

=== Common Tunnel ===
The western lines terminated at an underground station on the west side of the city centre, while the metro terminated at an underground station at the east side of the city centre. The two termini were located 1.2 kilometres (0.75 mi) apart. Sentrum station, located in the heart of the city centre, 0.5 kilometres (0.31 mi) east of Jernbanetorget, opened along with the extension of the metro tunnel in 1977. Water leaks exceeding the drainage capacity forced the station to be closed between 1983 and 1987. When it reopened, the western light rail tunnel had been extended to it, and the station was renamed Stortinget. Because of incompatible signalling and power equipment, it was not possible for trains to run through the whole tunnel. In 1993, the western part of the Common Tunnel and the Sognsvann Line were upgraded to metro standard, followed by the Røa Line two years later. Trains on the Holmenkollen and Kolsås Line needed both pantographs and third rail shoes to operate, using the former on the outer parts of the line and the latter in the tunnel. They switched to overhead wire at Frøen station and Montebello station, respectively. In 1994, six two-car T2000 trains were delivered for the Holmenkollen Line to meet the need for more rolling stock. Additional orders of the class were originally planned to replace the older stock, but the T2000 trains proved unreliable and no further order was made.

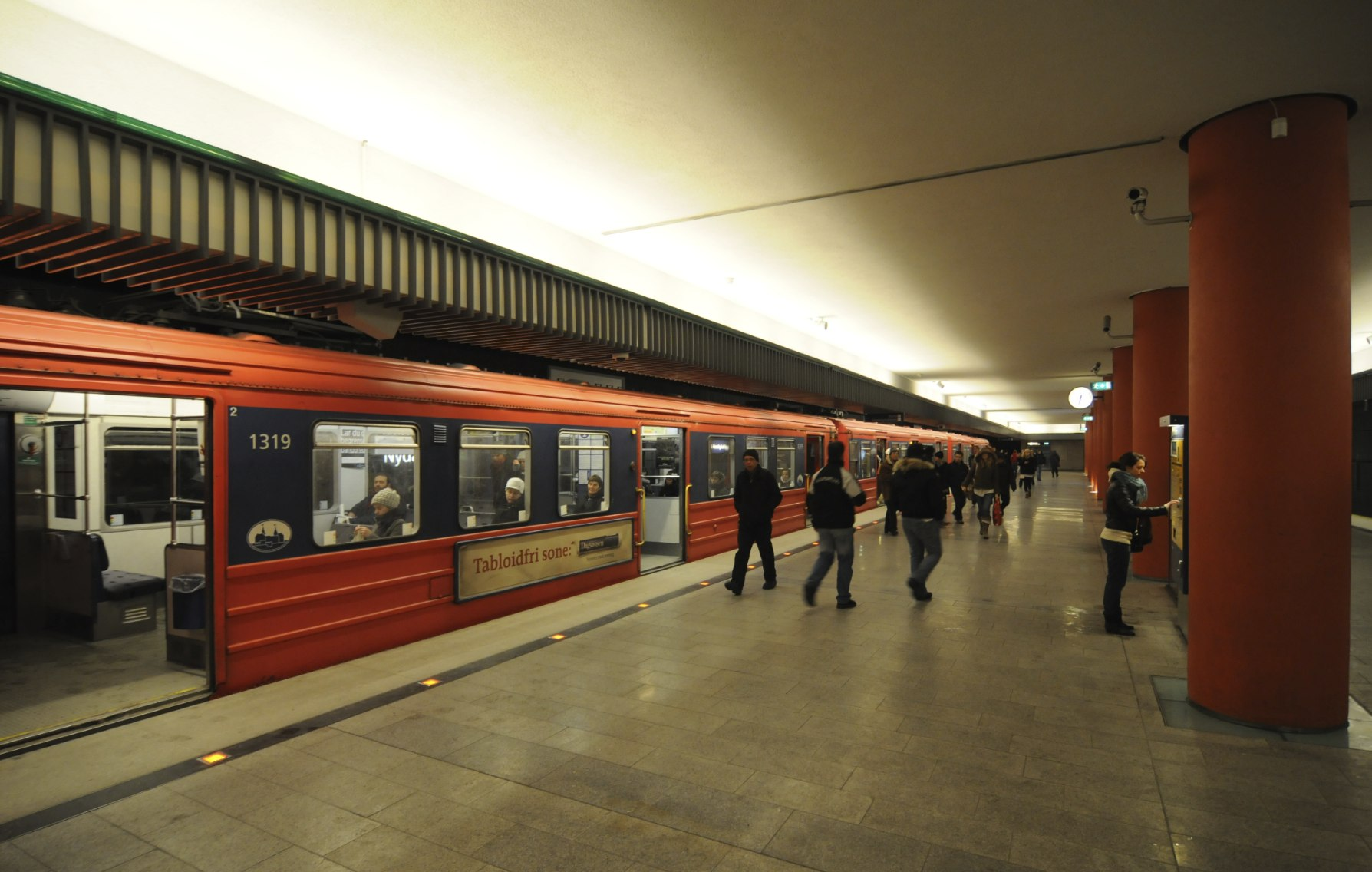
Nydalen on the Ring Line

In 2003, the section of the Kolsås Line in Bærum closed due to disagreements between the two counties of Oslo and Akershus on how much Akershus should pay to purchase services from Oslo Sporveier. After a year of replacement buses, the line was reopened, only to be closed again in 2006 for an upgrade to metro standard. Disagreements between the two counties means the upgrade will be done separately on the two sides of the municipal boundary, with the Oslo side opening first. By 2010, the upgraded part had reached Bjørnsletta station in Oslo. In 2003, the Ring Line opened from Ullevål Stadion station on the Sognsvann Line to Storo station. The line was meant to create a loop, which eventually would connect to neighbourhoods such as Nydalen and Bjerke north of the city centre. In July 2004, construction caused a tunnel to collapse on the Grorud Line—the system's busiest—forcing a shutdown of this line until December and creating havoc on the overloaded replacement buses. The ring was completed onwards to Carl Berners plass on the Grorud Line via Sinsen in 2006. In 2007, the system started taking delivery of the new MX3000 trains, which replaced all the old stock. By 2010, all T1000, T1300 and T2000 trains had been retired. In 2010, the Holmenkollen Line reopened with metro standard, after it had been closed for renovation for a year.

== Revival of the tramway ==
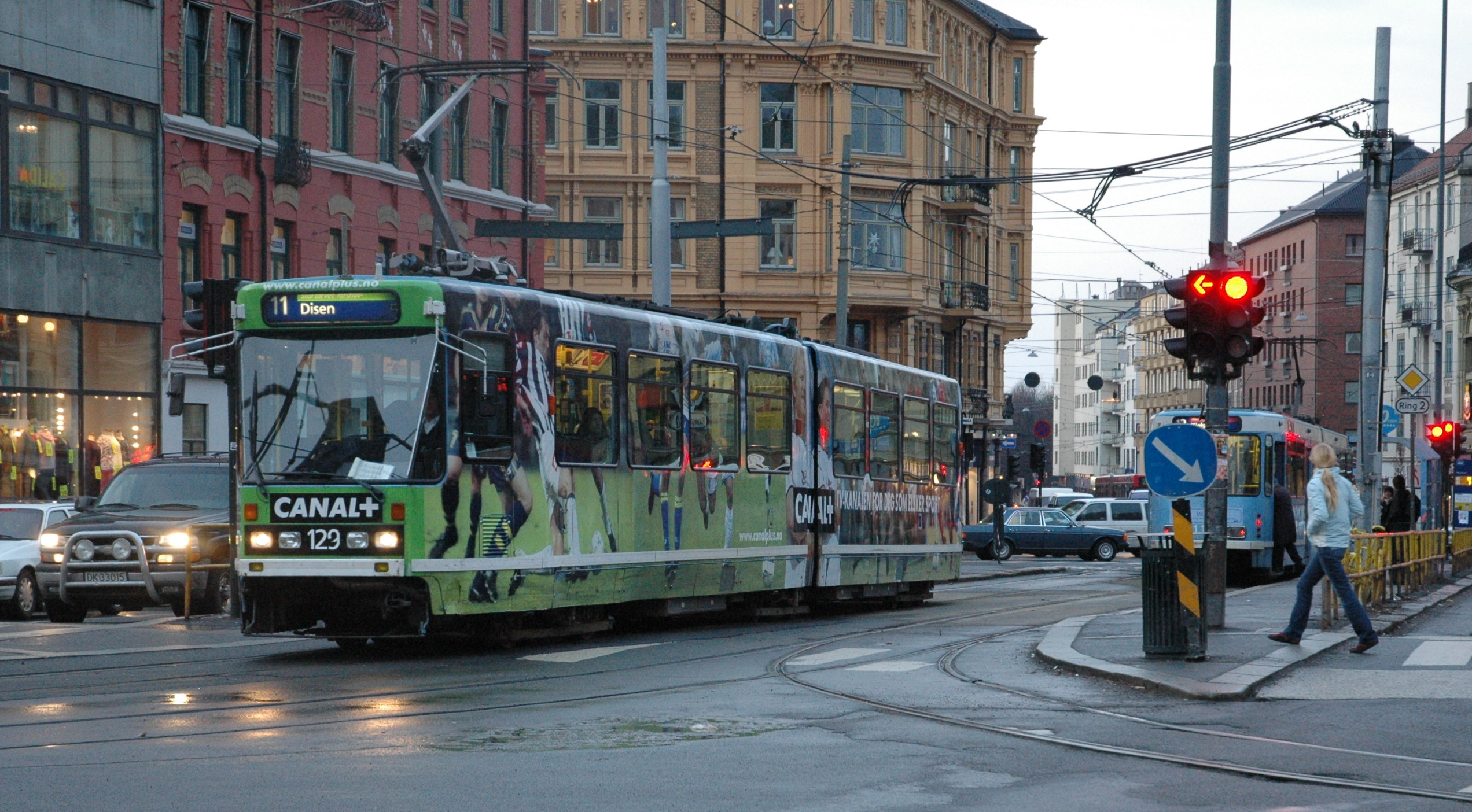
The SL79 trams were ordered in 1979 after the decision to keep the tramway, here at Majorstuen.

In 1977, the city council changed their decision to close down the tramway. The main reason was the 1973 oil crisis, which had made it cheaper to run hydroelectric-powered trams than diesel-powered buses. After no investment on the tramway for seventeen years, new stock had to be bought, and Oslo Sporveier opted to buy seven used M-23 units from the Gothenburg Tramway in Sweden. In addition, twenty-five SL79 articulated trams were delivered in 1982 and 1983, followed by a further fifteen in 1989 and 1990. Oslo Sporveier merged with Holmenkolbanen in 1991, and with Ekebergbanen in 1993.

During the 1990s, a number of expansions were made to the tram network. The disused line from Storo via the depot at Grefsen to Sinsen opened for revenue traffic in 1993. In 1995, the Vika Line was constructed to access Aker Brygge, a new waterfront neighbourhood is the southwestern part of the city centre, and in 1999, the Ullevål Hageby Line was extended to the new Rikshospitalet. For these new lines, 32 SL95 low-floor trams were delivered from 1996 to 2004, replacing all but the SL79 units. The voltage was increased from 600 to 750 volts on 4 June 2000, once all non-articulated trams had been retired.

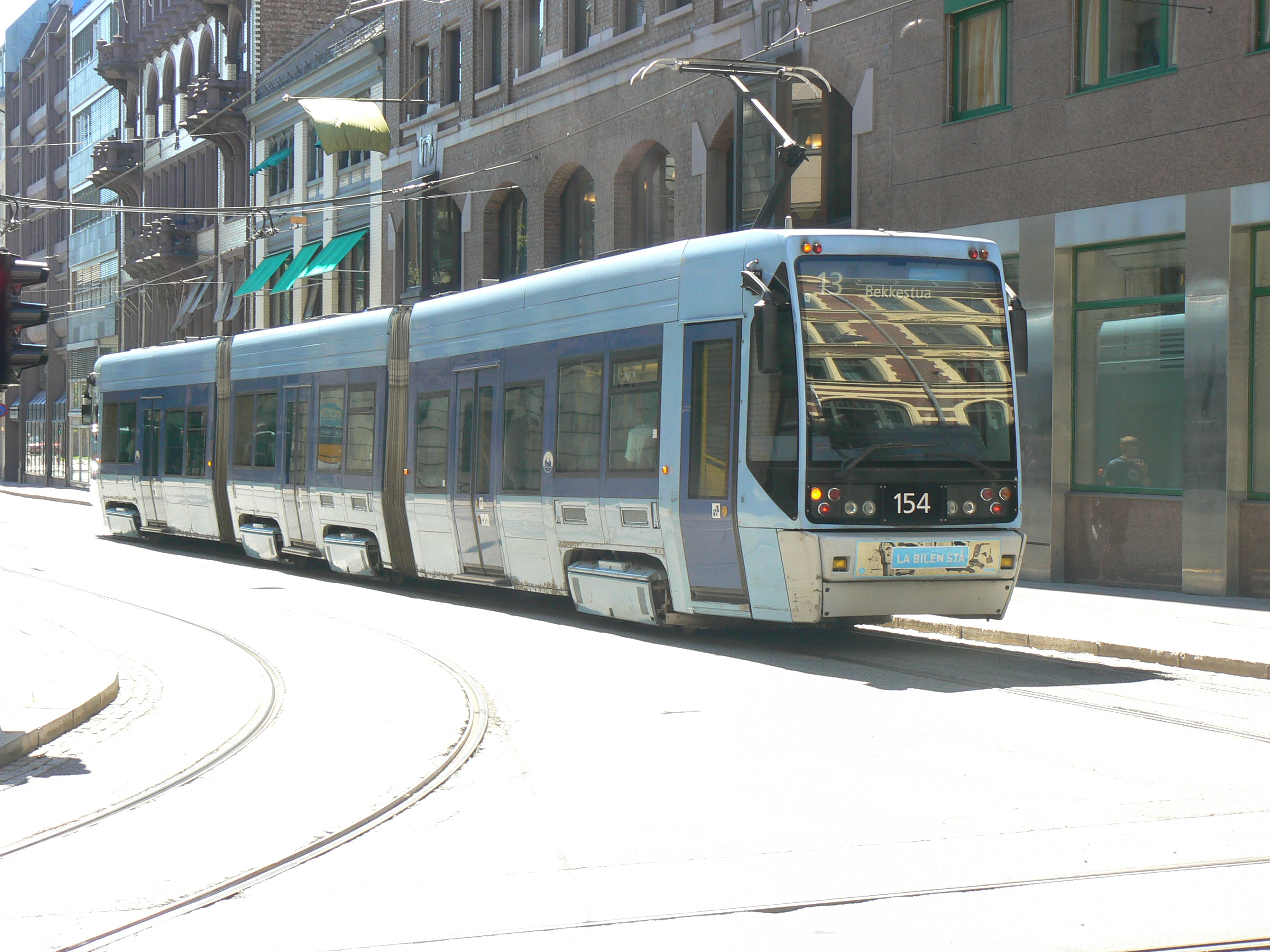
The SL95 low-floor trams were introduced in 2000

In 2002, Oslo Sporveier announced that it would close the Ekeberg, Sinsen, Briskeby and Kjelsås Lines to reduce costs. Only the Kjelsås Line was actually closed and replaced by buses, which occurred 21 November 2002. After local protests, and a compromise in the city council, the Kjelsås Line was reopened on 22 November 2004.

On 1 July 2003, Oslo Sporveier was reorganized with the operation of the trams transferred to Oslo Sporvognsdrift ("Oslo Tram Operations") and the operation of the Metro to Oslo T-banedrift ("Oslo Metro Operations"). Another reorganization was made on 1 July 2006, when Oslo Sporveier was demerged into two companies. The Oslo Public Transport Administration, which kept the Oslo Sporveier brand name, was made responsible for purchasing and the marketing of the public transport system. The ownership and maintenance of the tracks and stations was transferred to Kollektivtransportproduksjon ("Public Transport Production"). The latter also became the parent of the operating companies, who retained the actual running of the trams and metro trains. The brand name Oslo Sporveier was discontinued on 1 January 2008, when Ruter was created as a merger between the Oslo Public Transport Administration and Stor-Oslo Lokaltrafikk ("Greater Oslo Local Traffic")—which had been responsible for public transport in Akershus.

== Preservation ==
In 1966, the Oslo Tramway Museum was founded to preserve the tramway and trolleybus vehicles. The museum is run by a 450-member non-profit organization Lokaltrafikkhistorisk Forening (LTF, "Local Traffic History Association"). It was founded as a reaction to the aftermath of the closing of the Bergen Tramway, where only a single tram was preserved, and where volunteers realized that a similar lack of preservation could happen in Oslo. As of 2004, the museum had 56 rail vehicles, 31 buses and seven other vehicles, including four trolleybuses. It has a museum with 25 trams and 10 buses on display at Majorstuen, as well as a full heritage tramway, including Slemdal station, which is under construction at Vinterbro.

== Future plans ==
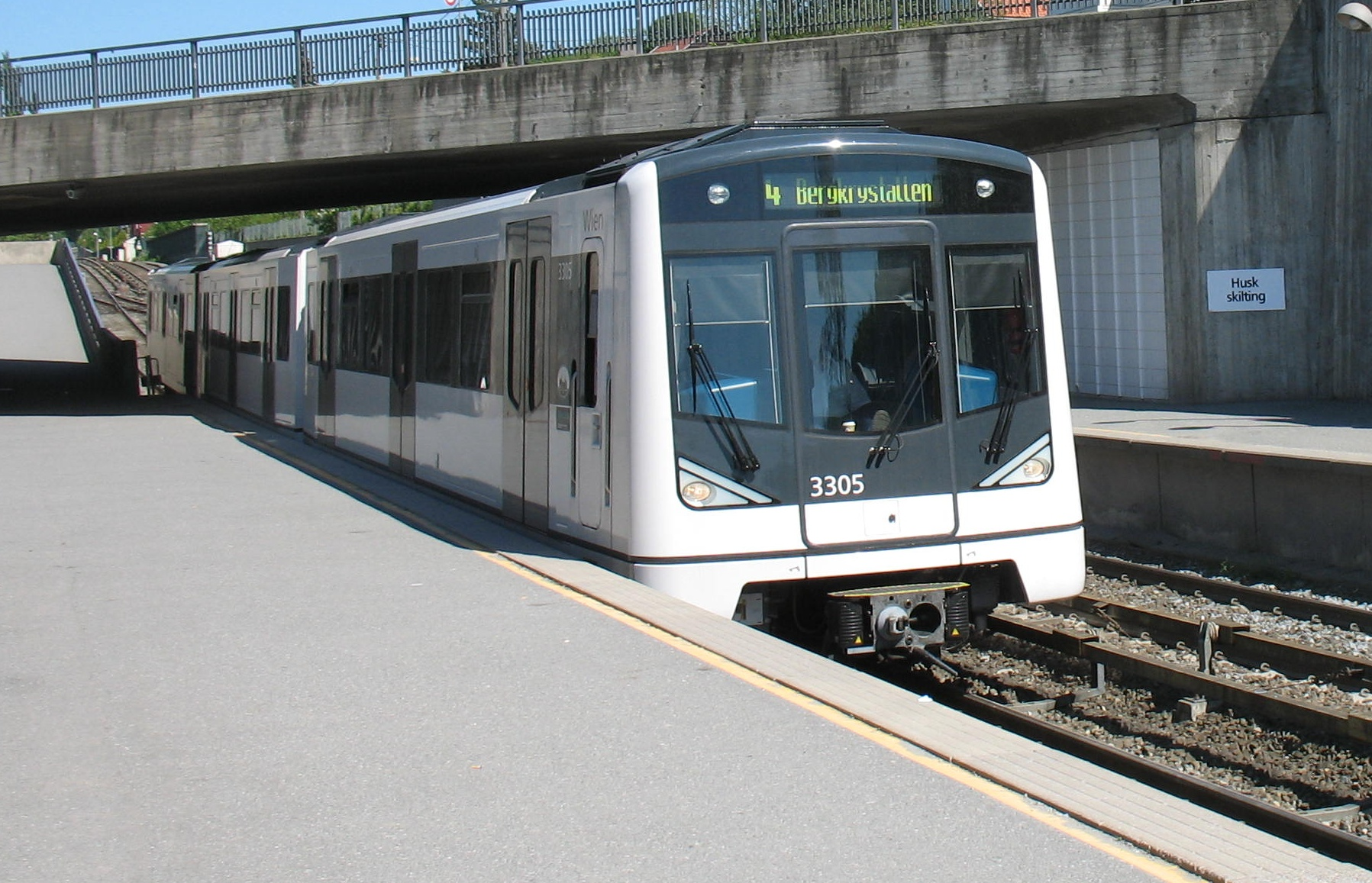
Delivery of the MX3000 stock started in 2006.

Oslo Package 3 is a political agreement between all the major projects on what to spend public funding for transport in Oslo and Akershus on. The agreement was made in 2007, and consists of 53 billion Norwegian krone (NOK), which will be shared between investments in road infrastructure, public transport infrastructure, and operating subsidies for Ruter. Financing comes from the state, the counties and from toll roads. The agreement states the major investments which are planned during a 20-year period. In addition, the previous agreement, Oslo Package 2, still has funding for some smaller projects.

An upgrade of the Kolsås Line to metro standard started in 2006, and was finished by 2014. In the Common Tunnel, a new Homansbyen Station is planned between Majorstuen and Nationaltheatret. The Grorud Line is planned be connected to the Ring Line via the Løren Line, allowing trains to run directly from Grorud to the Ring via a station at Løren. An extension has been proposed for the Furuset Line to Lørenskog, which would give stations at Visperud, Lørenskog Centre and a new terminus at Akershus University Hospital (Ahus). The travel time from Ahus to Jernbanetorget would be 27 minutes.

The Fjord City urban redevelopment project that is converting the Bjørvika and Vippetangen areas in the centre of Oslo, will include a gradual building of tramways through them. The Ekeberg Line will be moved to run on the south side of the Central Station through Bjørvika. A new line may also be built from Aker Brygge around Vippetangen to Bjørvika. A similar redevelopment project at Fornebu in Bærum involves plans for building the Fornebu Line as an extension of the Lilleaker Line from Furulund via Lysaker Station to Fornebu. The line was previously planned as a people mover, but the solution was unsuccessful, and planning now focuses on building a tramway instead. An extension of the Sinsen Line to Tonsenhagen is planned.
