= KES Class A =

Class A
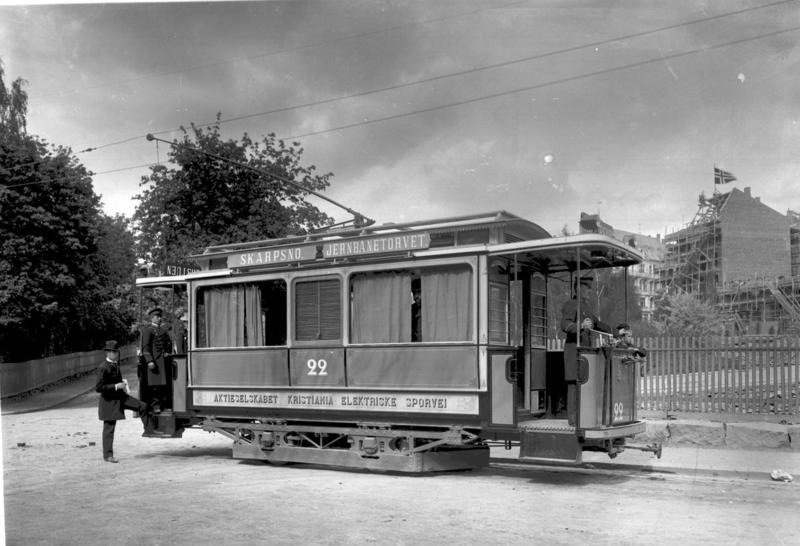
- Manufacturer: Allgemeine Elektrizitäts Gesellschaft; P. Herbrand & Cie.
- Constructed: 1893–98
- Number built: 21 motor cars 21 trailers
- Capacity: 16 seated, 12 standing
- Operators: Kristiania Elektriske Sporvei

Specifications
- Car length: 6.4 m (21 ft 0 in)
- Width: 2.0 m (6 ft 7 in)
- Weight: 6.0 t (motor car)
- Traction system: 2× AEG NB80
- Power output: 24 kW (32 hp)
- Electric system(s): 600 V DC overhead line
- Current collector(s): Trolley pole
- Track gauge: 1,435 mm (4 ft 8 1/2 in)

Class A (Norwegian: Type A) was a class of twenty-one trams and twelve trailers built by Allgemeine Elektrizitäts Gesellschaft (AEG) and P. Herbrand & Cie. for Kristiania Elektriske Sporvei (KES) for use on the Oslo Tramway of Norway. The units measured 6.4 by 2 meters (21 ft 0 in by 6 ft 7 in) and featured a wooden superstructure with an indoor cabin and open platform bays. This gave a capacity for sixteen seated passengers. Each twin-axle unit was equipped with two motors. Eighteen of the units had a power output of 24 kilowatts (32 hp), the other three 36 kilowatts (48 hp). One unit was built by Norsk Elektrisk and Skabo.

The first series of eleven trams and seven trailers were delivered for the company's opening of services on 2 March 1894. A further four trams were delivered in December and two more in 1897. The Norsk Elektrisk unit was bought in 1897 and the next year the three more powerful units were delivered. The last batch of trailers were bought in 1899. From 1910 the class was too small and the motor units were rebuilt to trailers. From 1917 they were again modified, this time merging two and two to make a larger trailer. The original trailers were in service until 1936, while the larger units remained until 1949. One motorized tram, in its original configuration, has been preserved.

== History ==
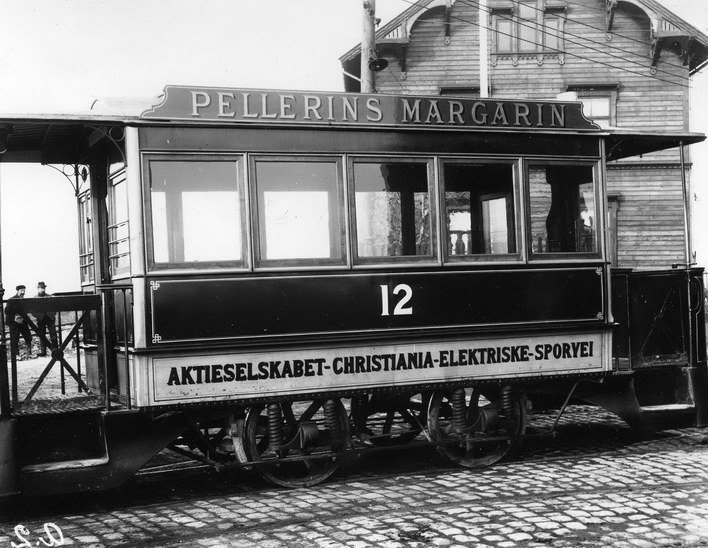
Trailer no. 12

Kristiania Elektriske Sporvei was the second tram operator in Oslo when it was established in 1892. Its first task was the construction of the Briskeby Line and the Skøyen Line. The company issued a tender for a complete electrical system, and six companies bid. KES selected Allgemeine Elektrizitäts Gesellschaft of Berlin as its supplier, not only for the trams, but also the power supply and overhead wire system. As part of the agreement AEG became a majority shareholder in KES. The system in Oslo was AEG's sixth system and was still subject to a trial and error approach.

The trams were manufactured by P. Herbrand & Cie. of Cologne, with electrical components from AEG and undercarriages from Bergische Stahlindustri. The first series of eleven trams and seven trailers were delivered 1894 ahead of the official opening on 2 March 1894. The trams were numbered 1–11 and the trailers 12–18. The service proved more popular than the company had calculated and they therefore quickly ordered additional trams. Four units were delivered in December and numbered 19–22.

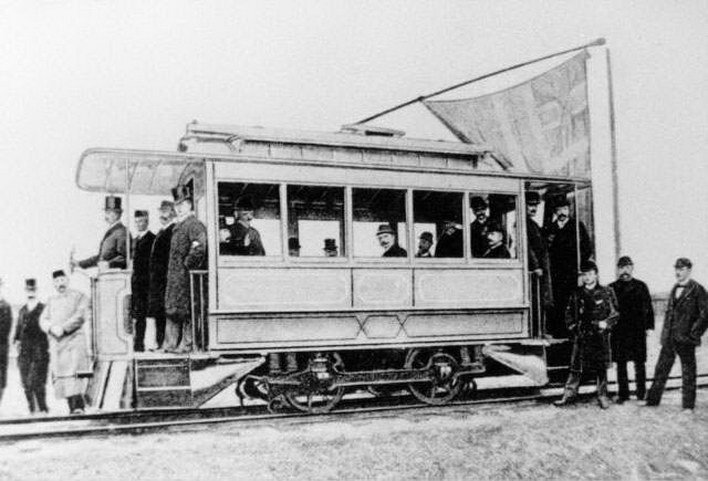
The Skabo and Norske Eletrisk tram upon completion in 1895

Meanwhile the Norwegian electrical manufacturer Norsk Elektrisk intended to enter the tram market. They cooperated with Skabo to build a tram with the same specifications as the Class A, which was completed in 1895. They applied KES to conduct trial runs on their tramway, but KES had a clause in their contract with AEG which hindered from fraternizing with other manufacturers. NEBB was therefore forced to carry out tests on their own private tracks. However, KES was able to use the incident as leverage to get two additional trams delivered in 1896. They were headed to the Straßburg Tramway, but delays there allowed them to be relocated to Oslo and numbered 23–24.

AEG's ownership was taken over by Norwegian investors in early 1897. KES immediately took contact with Norsk Elektrisk and requested that they test the tram. This was successful and the tram was bought in May. In September a race was organized by Norsk Elektrisk, where an AEG, NEA and Class 1898 tram of Holmenkolbanen raced up the Holmenkollen Line. The AEG tram won, reaching an average speed of 17.3 km/h (10.7 mph) with a power usage of 0.40 kilowatt per tonne. The Holmenkolbanen tram finished second, with an average speed of 16.7 km/h (10.4 mph) and 0.38 kW/t. The NEA unit finished last, with an average 16.5 km/h (10.3 mph) and 0.36 kW/t.

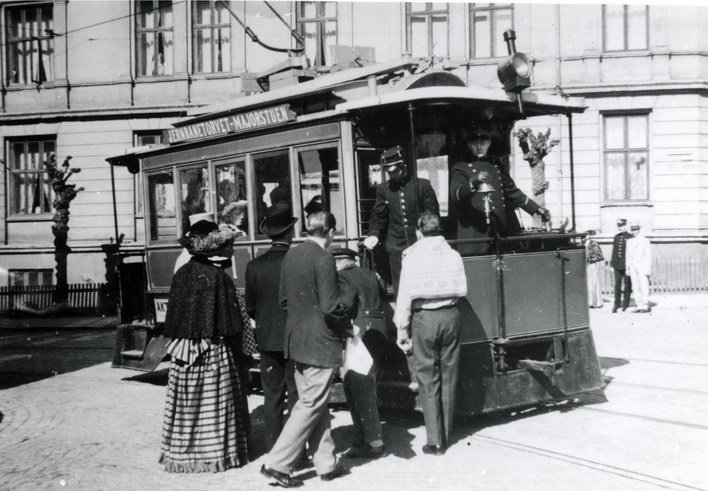
Passengers embarking on tram no. 1

About this time all the units were rebuilt to control power through regulation of their resistance, which simplified operations. The last three trams were delivered in 1898 and already had resistance controlling. They were numbered 18–20. Unlike the others these had more powerful motors. In addition, KES took delivery of five trailers from Herbrand, numbered 41–45.

A year later KES started taking delivery of the more modern Class U trams. In 1902 KES was forced to renumber all its trams to avoid confusion with its competitor Kristiania Sporveisselskap (KSS), and all trams were thus numbered from 101 and upwards. KES started taking delivery of the larger Class SS trams in 1909. With them the Class A was regarded as small and from 1910 the company started rebuilding them to trailers. The original trailers originally did not have any braking system, and with increasing speeds this became necessary to install from 1912 to 1914. At the same time the wheelbase was increased. The last motorized versions were taken out of service after the 1914 Jubilee Exhibition. No. 102 was never rebuilt and kept as a shunter. It was therefore possible to retire it as a heritage tram in 1919. It was then rebuilt to its original design at delivery and has since been transferred to the Norwegian Museum of Science and Technology.

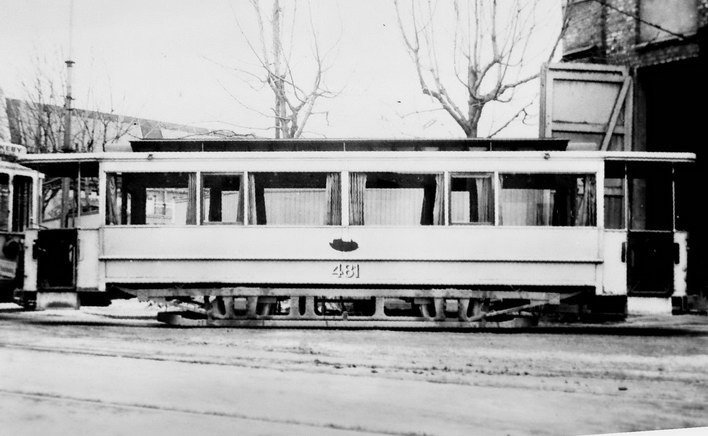
Rebuilt "long" trailer, no. 481

From 1917 the modified trailers were rebuilt. The carriages and undercarriages of two and two units were split and merged to make a larger unit, to create ten new trailers. These were numbered 356 through 365. They were at first used on the Lilleaker Line. KES was merged with KSS in 1924 to form Oslo Sporveier and the trailers were transferred to the new company. There the ex-motor trailers were renumbered 474 through 483. They continued in service until 1949, when the closing of the Korsvoll Line and the Rodeløkka Line created surplus rolling stock which could be retired. The trailers were scrapped from April 1951 to March 1952.

The original trailers were little used after 1914, and were mostly utilized as a second trailer behind Class SS trams. Patronage fell from 1929, and in 1930 the first two were retired. The rest of the original trams were taken out of services from 1932 to 1936 as part of a rationalization program which involved retiring the smallest trailers.

== Specifications ==
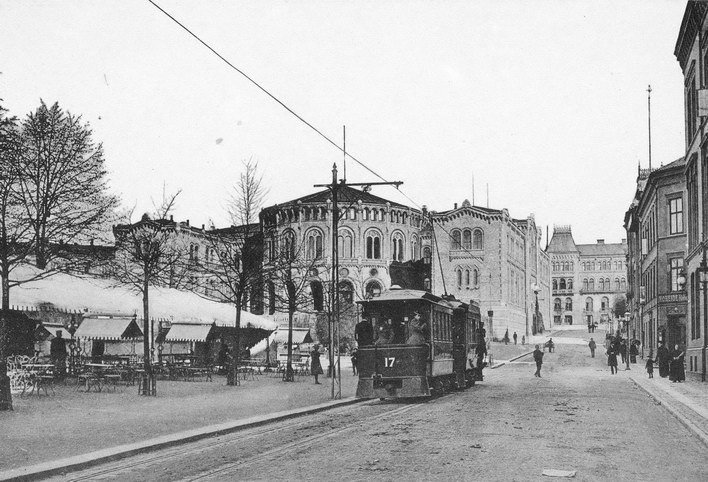
Trailer 17

The trams were built with very similar specifications, although there were a few variations. Painted green, all units measured 6.4 by 2.0 meters (21 ft 0 in by 6 ft 7 in), except units 118–120, which were 6.50 meters (21 ft 4 in) long. All had an open bay platform with roofs at each end and a center cabin, with benches in the longitudinal direction. The cabin had five equally-sized windows on each side. The windows were later changed to three, in a long–short–long pattern. They had a wooden superstructure, but were clad on the inside with thin iron sheets. The trams would seat 16 passengers and 12 could stand, in addition to the motorman and conductor. All the units weighed 6 tonnes. They were twin-axle with a wheelbase of 155 centimeters (5 ft 1 in) and a wheel diameter of 845 millimeters (33.3 in). The trams originally had a skirt, but these were soon removed as they caused problems during operations.

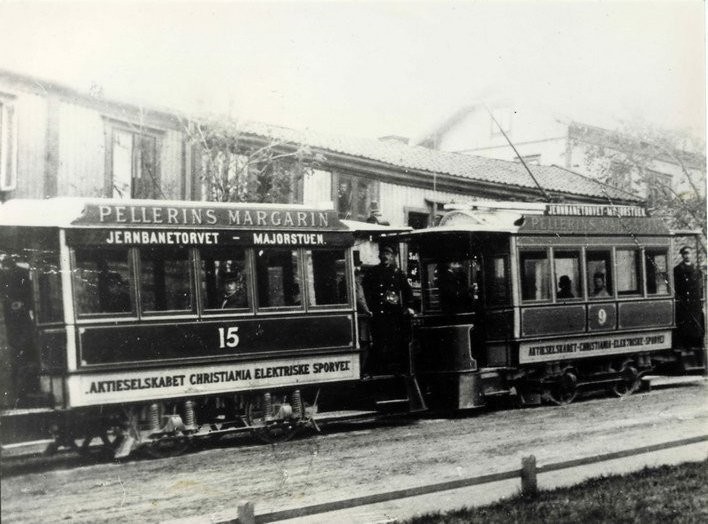
Tram 9 and trailer 15

All trams except no. 117–120 were delivered with two NB80 motors from AEG. These each had a power output of 12 kilowatts (16 hp), giving a combined effort of 24 kilowatts (32 hp). No. 118–120 were delivered with the more powerful VNB120, each with a power output of 18 kilowatts (24 hp), for a total 36 kilowatts (48 hp). These were both bipolar serial direct current motors organized as a compound motor. This allowed the speed to be regulated through the altering of the three spools between series and shunts, predefined in seven switches. In addition they had switches for reverse and emergency breaking. Power was collected through a trolley pole. All units were delivered with clamp brakes for operation and a dynamic braking through shorting for emergencies.

One of the trams, no. 117, was a prototype built by Skabo with motors from Norsk Elektrisk & Brown Boveri. It had the same dimensions and general design of the other units, but had two NEA1 motors, also rated at 12 kilowatts (16 hp) each.

The first trailers had the same dimensions as the motorized vehicles. This consisted of a 4.2-meter (13 ft 9 in) long cabin with eating for 16, although the lack of a motorman allowed for 18 standing passengers. The second series was 7.2 meters (23 ft 7 in) long overall and had 4.5-meter (14 ft 9 in) cabins. Unlike the first series which had longitudinal seating, the second series received two plus one abreast seating, with seats in opposing directions.
