= Skillebekk =

Neighbourhood of Oslo, Norway

Coordinates: 59°54′45″N 10°42′41″E

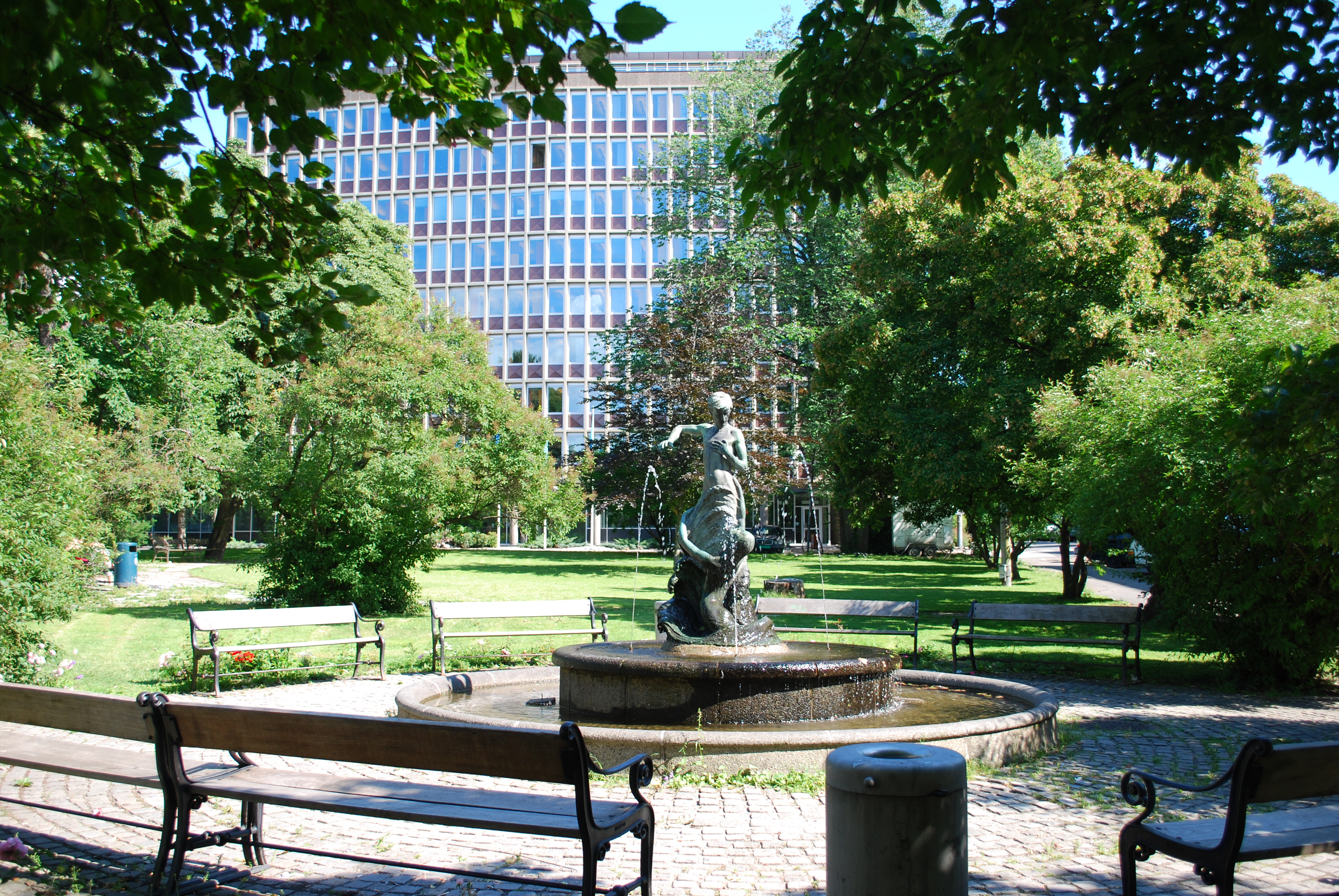
Skillebekkparken

Skillebekk is a neighbourhood of Oslo, Norway. It is located near Solli plass in the West End of Oslo, and is served by the station Skillebekk on the Skøyen Line. The name originates from Skillebekken, a brook between Bymarken and Frogner Hovedgård.
