= Skarpsno tram stop =

Tram stop in Oslo, Norway

Skarpsno
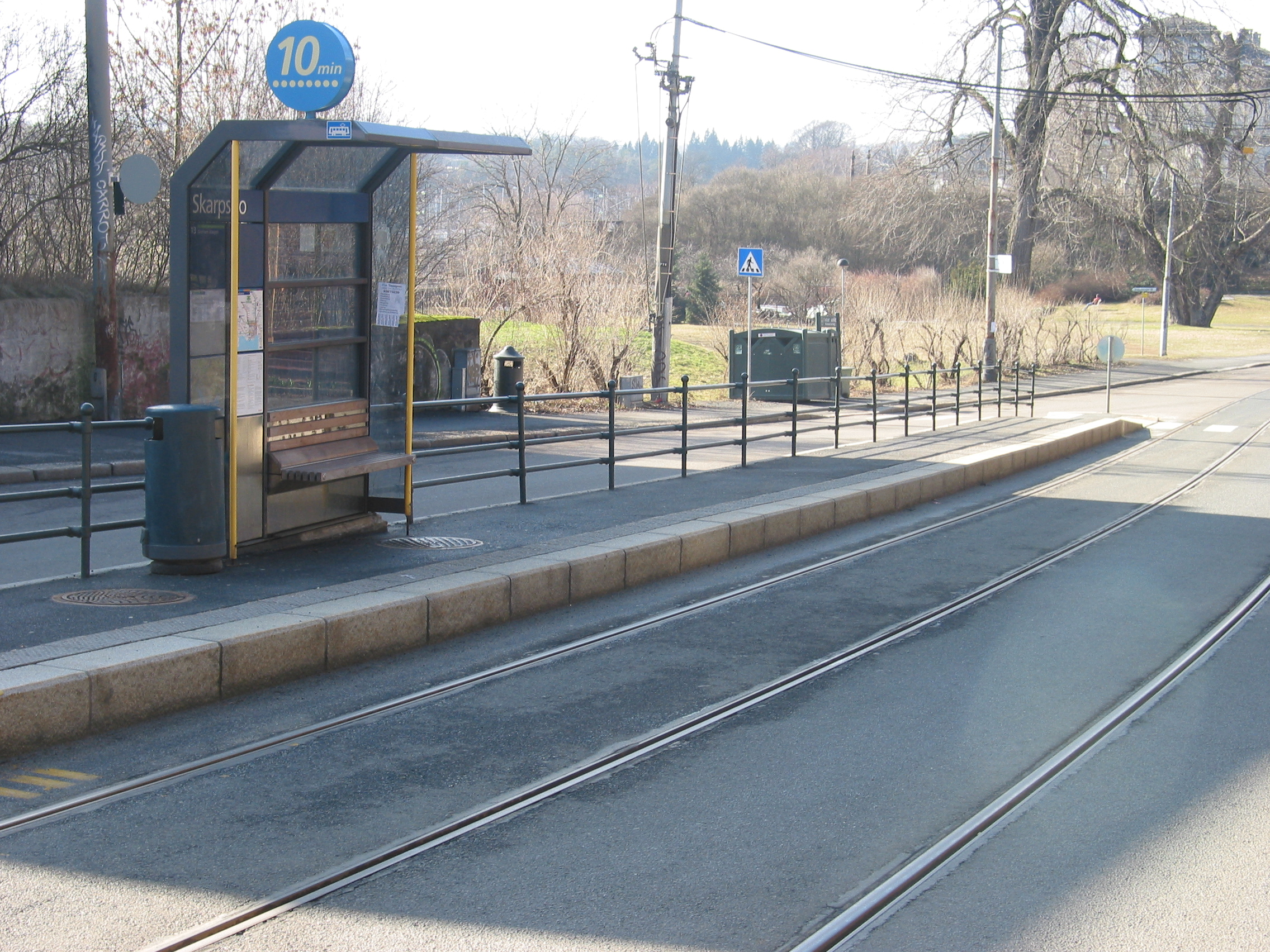

General information
- Location: Skarpsno, Oslo; Norway
- Coordinates: 59.914303°N 10.702341°E
- Line: Skøyen Line

History
- Opened: 2 March 1894
Location

Skarpsno is a tram stop on the Oslo Tramway.

Located at Skarpsno, it was opened by Kristiania Elektriske Sporvei on 2 March 1894 as a part of the first stretch of what would become the Skøyen Line. It is served by line 13.

Preceding station	Trams in Oslo	Following station
Nobels gate towards Bekkestua	Line 13	Skillebekk towards Ljabru
