= Skillebekk tram stop =

Tram stop in Oslo, Norway

Skillebekk
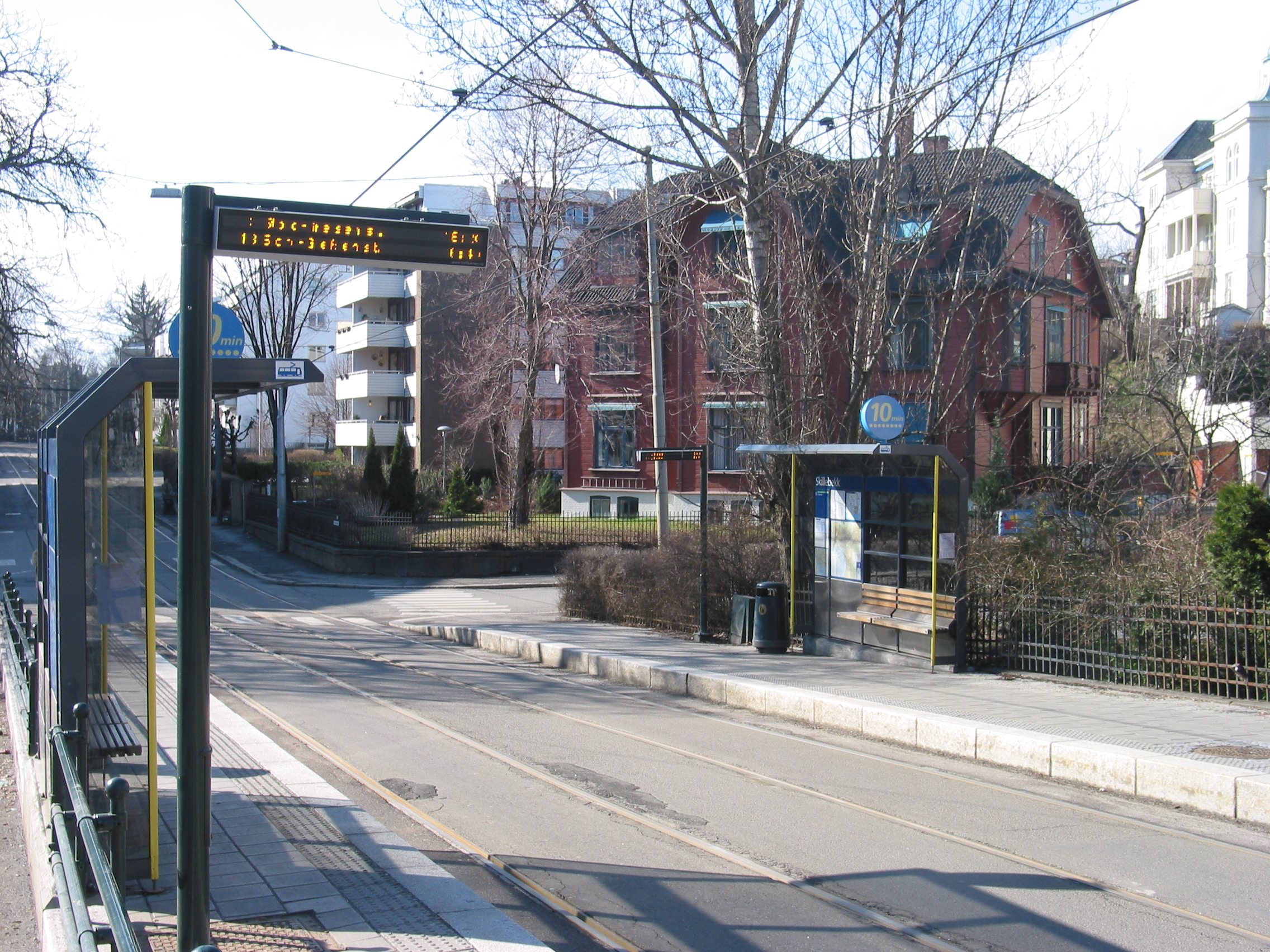

General information
- Location: Skillebekk, Oslo; Norway
- Coordinates: 59.912773°N 10.711026°E
- Line: Skøyen Line

History
- Opened: 2 March 1894
Location

Skillebekk is a light rail tram stop on the Oslo Tramway.

Located at Skillebekk, it was opened by Kristiania Elektriske Sporvei on 2 March 1894 as a part of the first stretch of what would become the Skøyen Line. It is served by line 13.

The station is named after the brook Skillebekken. The first element is skille n 'division, border', the last element is the finite form of bekk m 'beck, brook'. The brook marked the western limit of Oslo city until 1879.

Preceding station	Trams in Oslo	Following station
Skarpsno towards Bekkestua	Line 13	Solli towards Ljabru
