= Nobels gate tram stop =

Tram stop in Oslo, Norway

Nobels gate
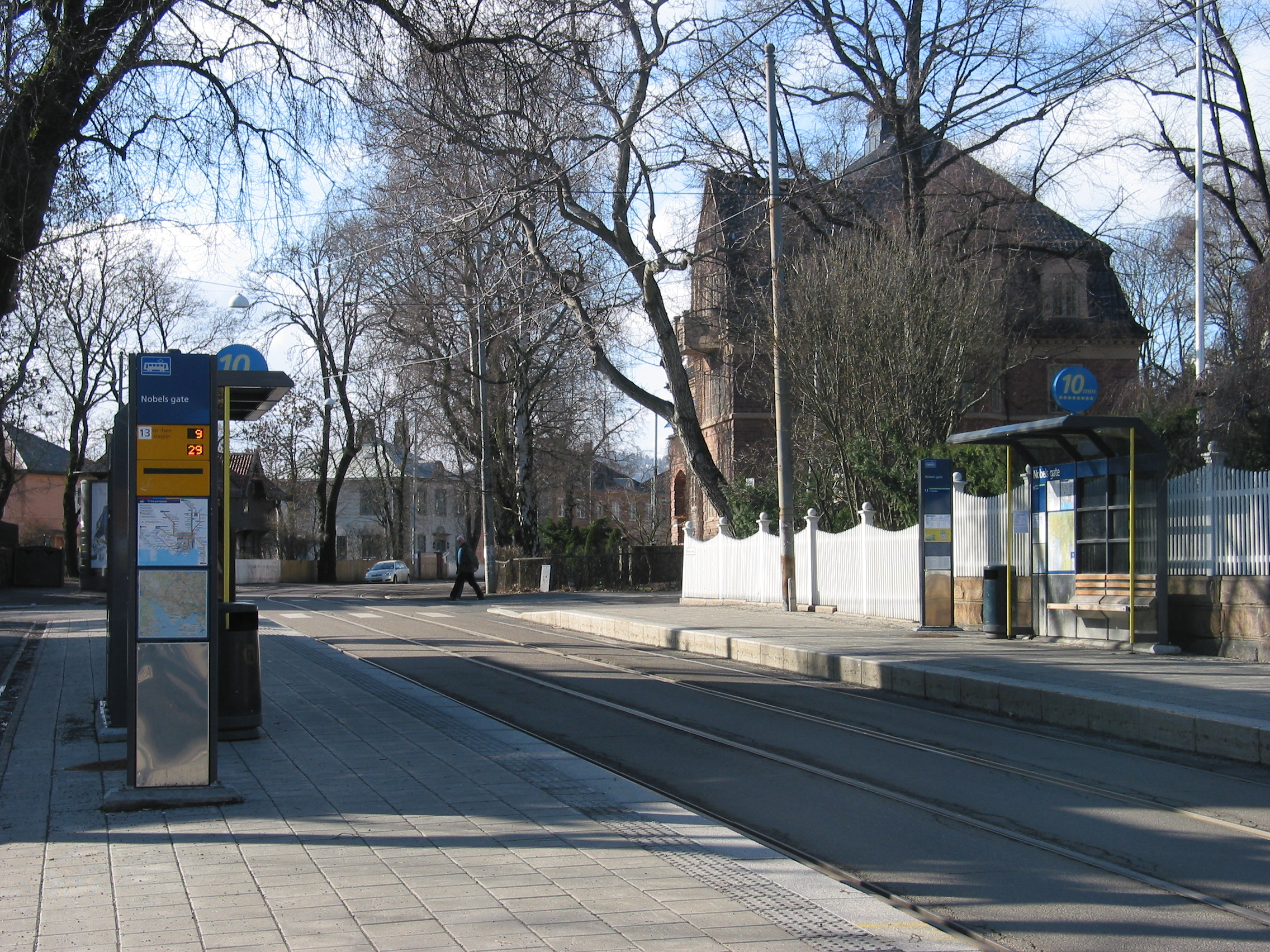

General information
- Location: Frogner, Oslo; Norway
- Coordinates: 59.917575°N 10.698656°E
- Line: Skøyen Line

History
- Opened: 31 December 1894
Location

Nobels gate is a light rail/tram station on the Oslo Tramway.

Located at Frogner, it was opened by Kristiania Elektriske Sporvei on 31 December 1894 as an extension of the Skøyen Line. It is served by line 13. Nobels gate was formerly succeeded by Olay Kyrres plass and Halvdan Svartes gate when going westbound towards Skoyen, but were merged in 2006.

Preceding station	Trams in Oslo	Following station
Thune towards Bekkestua	Line 13	Skarpsno towards Ljabru
