= Thune tram stop =

Tram stop in Oslo, Norway

Thune
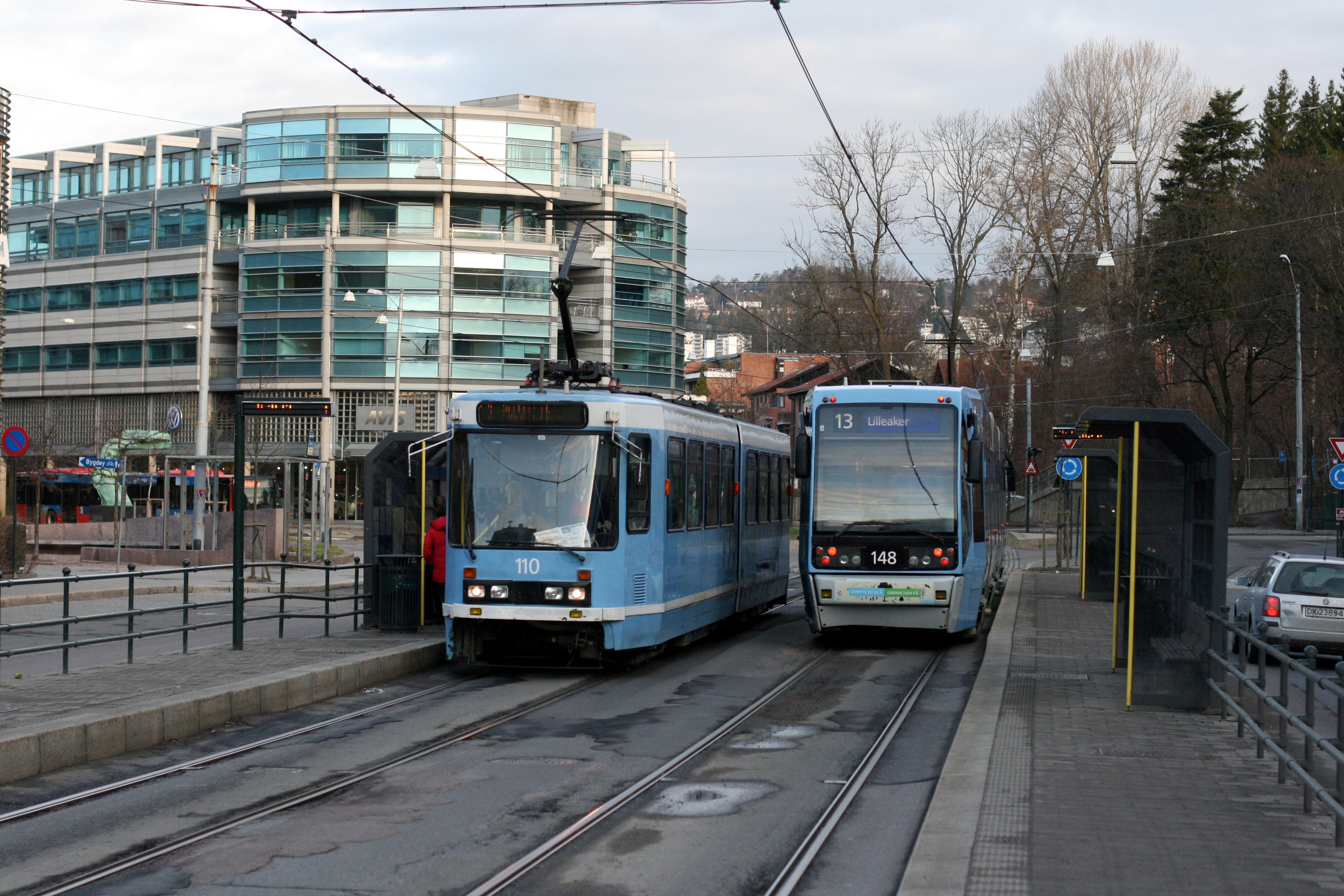
- Thune station with Møller Skøyen in the background.

General information
- Location: Skøyen, Oslo; Norway
- Coordinates: 59.921860°N 10.687422°E
- Line: Skøyen Line
- Connections: Bus: 20 Skøyen — Galgeberg — ( Helsfyr T) 31 Snarøya — Fornebu — Tonsenhagen — Grorud T

History
- Opened: 1901
Location

Thune is a light rail station on the Oslo Tramway.

Located at Skøyen, it was opened by Kristiania Elektriske Sporvei as an extension of the Skøyen Line 1901. It is served by line 13. It is currently located between Skøyen and Nobels gate.

The station used to serve the now-defunct locomotive factory Thunes Mekaniske Værksted. The car outlet Møller Skøyen is also nearby.

Preceding station	Trams in Oslo	Following station
Skøyen towards Bekkestua	Line 13	Nobels gate towards Ljabru
