= Kristiania Elektriske Sporvei =

Defunct tram company in Oslo, Norway

- Type: Private aksjeselskap
- Industry: Tramway
- Founded: 1892
- Defunct: 1924
- Fate: Merger
- Successor: Oslo Sporveier; Bærumsbanen
- Headquarters: Oslo, Norway

Kristiania Elektriske Sporvei AS (KES), colloquially called the Blue Tramway (Norwegian: Blåtrikken), was a company that operated the Oslo Tramway portion of Oslo public transport between 1894 and 1924. It built in Western Oslo a network of four lines: the Briskeby Line (the oldest), the Frogner Line (which ran to Majorstuen), the Skøyen Line and the Lilleaker Line. These all joined to a common line through the city center that terminated at Jernbanetorget.

KES was established as the second tram operator in Oslo (then known as Kristiania). It was the first electric tramway in Scandinavia. The Briskeby Line and the Skøyen Line (to Skillebekk) initially used a fleet of Class A trams. Class U and Class SS trams would follow, for a total 78 motor cars and 66 trailers. Skøyen was reached in 1903. The first phase of the Frogner Line opened in 1902 (completed in 1914). The Lilleaker Line reached Lilleaker in 1919. KES and its competitor, Kristiania Sporveisselskab (KSS) were substantially both taken over by Oslo Municipality in May 1924 and became Oslo Sporveier; the Lilleaker Line continued operation as Bærumsbanen.

== History ==
=== Establishment ===
Oslo Tramway was established in 1875 as a horsecar network by Kristiania Sporveisselskab. In 1887 it rejected a proposal from L. Samson, a real estate developer, to build a line to his projects at Majorstuen. He contacted engineers H. E. Heyerdal and A. Fenger-Krog, the latter having studied tramways abroad. They submitted to the municipality a proposal that never expressed explicitly the form of power. At the time Europe had no electric tramways in operation. KSS retained it priority in laying new lines.

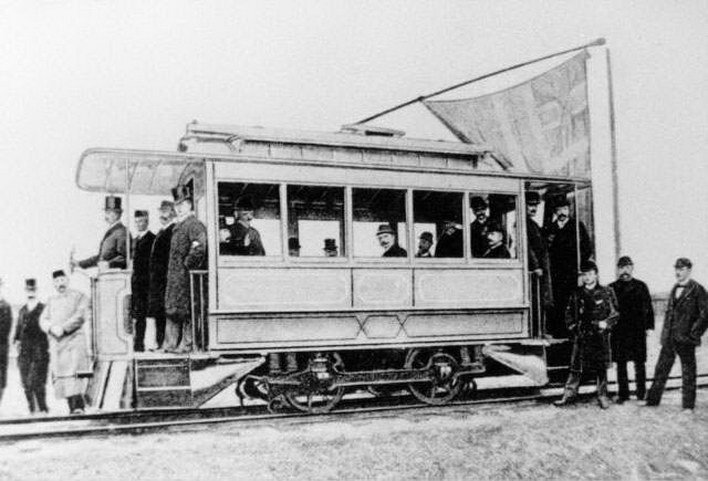
Tram 117 in 1895—a prototype built by Skabo and Norsk Elektrisk & Brown Boveri

They received permission for two lines: from Jernbanetorget (the square outside Oslo East Station) to Majorstuen and a branch that would feed into the line from Inkognitogaten and Drammensveien to Skøyen, 6 kilometers (3.7 mi) of track. The city engineer initially discouraged overhead wires, but after his trip to Germany he relented. On 19 May 1892 the municipal council granted a 30 year concession; the municipality retained the right to municipalize the company at fifteen years or at the end of the concession.

The 800,000 Norwegian krone (NOK) worth of shares issued in October 1892 were totally subscribed in a month. Kristiania Elektriske Sporvei AS was incorporated on 16 December 1892. Heyerdal was chair of the board until his death in 1917 and Fenger-Krog was hired as managing director. Six companies bid to deliver trams and electrical equipment; Allgemeine Elektrizitäts Gesellschaft (AEG) won and delivered seven Class A motor trams and five trailers. In June 1893 the contract to lay the tracks was issued to H. W. Wessel. The company wanted the municipality to buy power from its Oslo Lysverker, but was rejected. Instead a municipal power station was constructed at Majorstuen where was constructed the first depot, a prefabricated corrugated galvanized iron structure from Germany. Investments totaled NOK 817,572.

=== Early operations and expansion ===
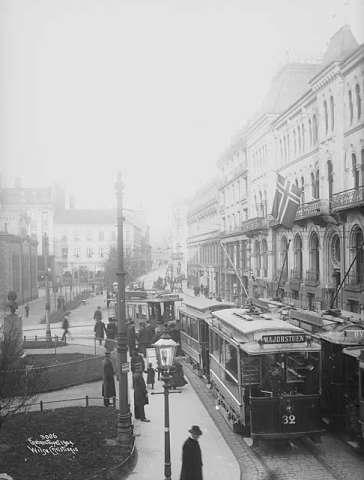
KES trams at Anthenum in the city center in 1904

Test runs started on 10 January 1894. The official opening of the first Nordic electric tramway took place on 2 March 1894 and ordinary operation commenced the following day. It was the seventh electric tramway in Europe in operation. Public sentiment concerned the reaction of horses (particularly those of KSS) toward horseless trams. When the horses seemed to cope with the new vehicles the union's proposal that trams have mounted on lead vehicle fronts stuffed horses was disregarded. Trams originally headway was every six minutes, but the pace proved difficult to maintain and it was increased to eight-minutes.

Other changes in operation included separating motorman driving and fare collection it immediately inefficient so conductors were hired. A bottleneck developed between the Skøyen Line and the Briskeby Line at Parkveien, as trams from Majorstuen were full and most passengers were forced to walk into town. In April KES introduced an express line from Skillebekk on the Skøyen Line to Jernbanetorget. The company soon found they had too few trams and four were delivered by year's end. The Skøyen Line was extended to Frognergaden on 31 December.

The original network was entirely single track with passing loops but express trams led to increased traffic. In 1896 KES applied for permission to lay double track from Parkveien to Jernbanetorget. A stipulation of the permit was the municipality bought newly issued shares for NOK 200,000 owning a fifth of the company. Work commenced in 1898, which also included moving the tracks from Parkveien to Inkognitogaten and from Bogstadveien to Valkyriegaten. In 1898 the double track opened to Majorstuen, and in three years the Skøyen Line. The latter included an extension to Thune.

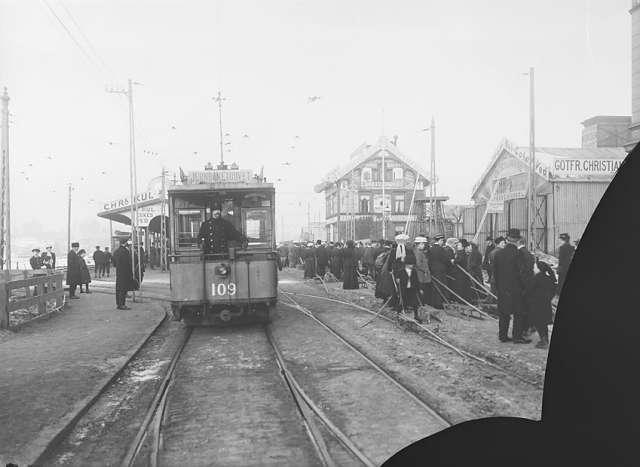
A Class A tram at Majorstuen in 1908

The company gradually expanded its fleet and by 1898 it had taken delivery of twenty-one Class A trams and twelve trailers. A year later a further six trailers were delivered. Jørgen Barth took over as managing director in 1898. The same year the Holmenkollen Line opened and at Majorstuen there was a transfer between the trams of KES and Holmenkolbanen. The company took delivery of its first nine larger Class U trams in 1899. This was followed by a further five in 1902 and another five each in 1905 and 1906. From 1901 KES introduced regular stops instead of stopping on signal.

The company's next task was extending the Skøyen Line and building a route via Frogner plass to Majorstuen. The KSS permit to extend its Vestbanen Line to Frogener was contingent on a construction start in 1901. That failure caused the municipality to offered KES the permit. The first phase of the Frogner Line, from Parkveien to Frogner plass, opened in October 1902 and KES was paying an eight percent dividend. The Skøyen Line, which was at the time named the Bygdøy Line, was operational to Skøyen on 21 June 1903. There was little investment the following years, although in 1907 and 1908 the company built double track to Frogner and to Thune. By 1907 the company had an annual revenue of NOK 700,000.

=== Later operations ===
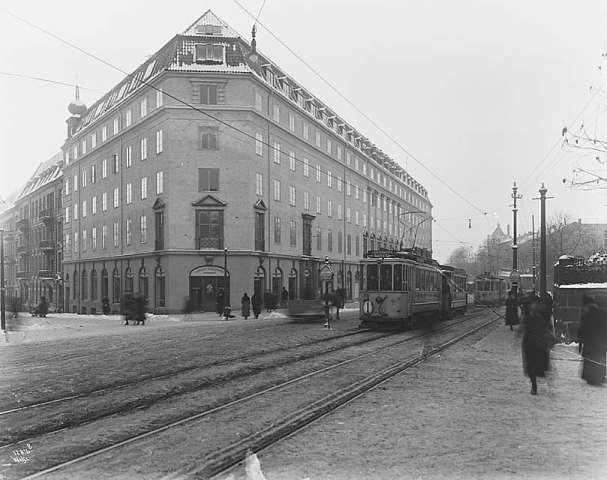
Trams on the Skøyen Line

KES was evaluated at NOK 3 million in 1908 and the fast approaching maturity of 1909 municipal buy-out stipulation. Sentiment was prevalent during the 1899 establishment of the municipal-owned Kristiania Kommunale Sporveie and the 1905 sale of it to KSS. By 1908 a strong Conservative majority in the city council, quelled similar high-profile debate about tram munisipalization. Instead the municipality negotiated for itself a four percent share of the company's gross revenue, increasing to five percent from 1914.

The power station efficiency was improved in 1909, cutting the coal usage from 4.0 to 1.3 kilograms (8.8 to 2.9 lb) per kilowatt hour. The company decided identified the need of enclosing the tram's open platform bays chiefly by the purchase of new rolling stock. The final five Class U trains were delivered in 1909, bringing the total to twenty-four. One issue that developed was the tram size based on a perceived belief of a wheelbase not exceeding a tenth of the minimum curve radius. When this proved wrong larger trams were delivered in 1909: eight Class SS trams. Deliveries resumed in 1912 and in the following two years a further twenty-six Class SS units followed.

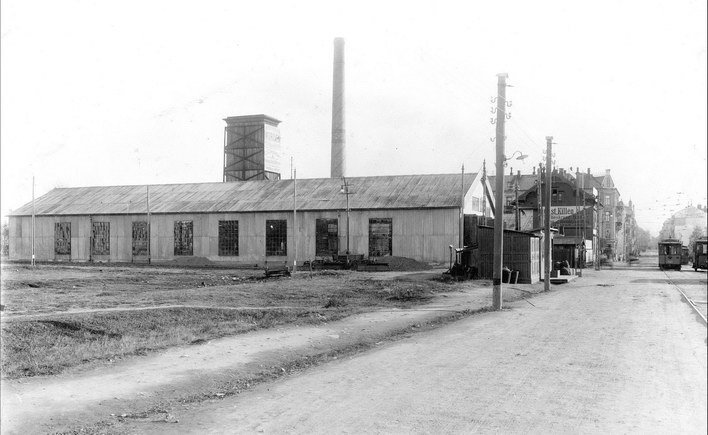
Majorstuen Depot's Hall 2, administration building and chimney for the power station. To the right are a tram each from KES and Holmenkolbanen

In 1909 when KES introduced numbered routes, being the first of the two companies to do so, secured them the lowest digits. The Briskeby Line was Line 1, the Frogner Line 2 and the Skøyen Line 3. From 1910 the increased rolling stock allowed most routes to reduce headway to five minutes. KES and KSS reached an agreement in 1912 to better coordinate their services. This first materialized in a connecting line in Hegdehaugsveien, which allowed trams to run from Stortorvet via the Ullevål Hageby Line to Majorstuen. At Skillebekk a connection was built through Munkedamsveien, allowing the Vestbanen Line access to the Skøyen Line. In conjunction with the 1914 Jubilee Exhibition at Frogner, the Frogner Line was opened along Kirkeveien to Majorstuen on 15 May 1914. In September a new depot opened at Majorstuen, with place for 75 vehicles—the largest in Scandinavia.

The third connection opened in 1915, linking Jernbanetorget to the Kampen Line and the Vålerenga Line through a connection along Vognmannsgata, Brugata and Vaterland Bridge. By 1915 the street tram network consisted of thirteen services, of which two were operated by KES and six were joint operations. All services via Homansbyen and Frogner to Majorstuen were joint services. The joint services were operated the relative number of trams in proportion of the ownership of trackage along the line and where each company simply kept the revenue it created on their services. The first women conductors were hired in 1916. Ten older Class A trams were rebuilt with larger wheelbase and bodies in 1918 and 1919, supplemented by 37 new motor trams and 56 new trailers.

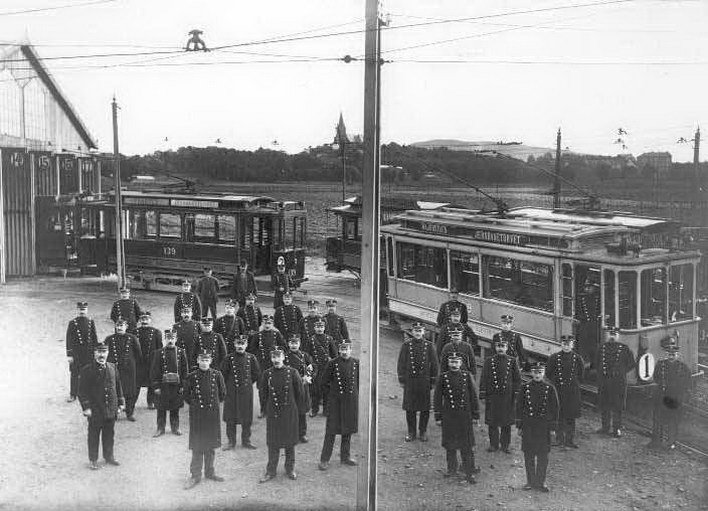
Staff and trams posing at Majorstuen in 1912

From the company's opening it had charged 10 øre ride fare, but this was raised to 15 øre in 1918, a price which would remain unaltered for the rest of its history. To ease management of such an odd amount, token coins were popular. They were sold with a quantity discount and were commonly used in Oslo as a conventional coin worth 15 øre. During this period the country was experiencing inflation. KES and the labor union could not reach an agreement for wage increases and the company was hit by a strike from 11 January to 22 March 1920. It was resolved through the municipality offering to reduce its charges. As part of the agreement, the 5 øre commuter prices in the morning and afternoon were abolished.

The company started looking into a further extension of the Skøyen Line in 1912, intending to reach Bestum and Øraker. They applied for a permit in 1913, which was issued in July 1915. KES immediately started construction of the Lilleaker Line. Trial runs were carried out on 8 May 1919 and the line officially opened to Lilleaker the following day. Unlike the rest of the network, the Lilleaker Line was built as a suburban light rail, running on an exclusive line rather than in the streets. KES started planning further extensions in 1917 and received permission in 1921 to extend the line to Avløs.

=== Municipalization ===
KES and KSS both had concessions which expired on the same date, in March 1924. At this point the municipality was free to purchase the companies at par value. A municipal committee was appointed in 1922 to look into the matter. KES was valuated at NOK 9 million, while KSS was worth NOK 12.5 million. Oslo Municipality was not interested in taking over the Lilleaker Line, as it was situated in the neighboring municipality of Aker. The committees majority proposed a merger and that KSS received a prolonged concession, while the minority recommended that the tramways be bought by the city. A third option, a jointly public and privately owned company, was also proposed, where the municipality would own fifty-one percent.

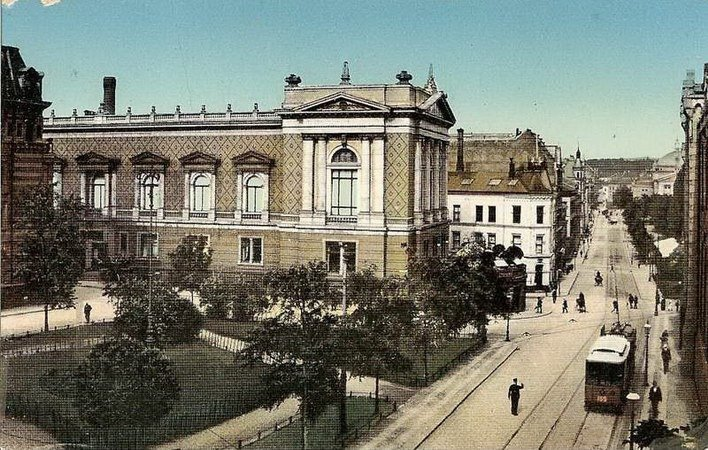
Tram in Stortingsgata in 1905

The issue was considered by the council's executive board, which supported the joint public–private proposal with eleven against nine votes. The argumentation was largely ideological: the left side accused the right for bringing economical advantages for private investors, while the right accused the left of insufficient financial investigations of municipal operations. The issue was voted on in the municipal council in December, with 43 against 41 councillors supporting the joint model. The latter were members of the Communist Party and the Labor Party, who both were in favor of a municipal take-over. The new company, Kristiania Sporveier, was incorporated in May 1924 and took over all street tram operations. The city changed its name to Oslo on 1 January 1925, as did the tram company.

With the municipalization, most of the assets were transferred to Oslo Sporveier. The exception was the Lilleaker Line, which was kept by the private company. That part was changed into a new tram company, Bærumsbanen. The street trams were transferred to Oslo Sporveier, although a few were kept until 1 July, when the Lilleaker Line was extended to Bekkestua. One the same day it took into use twelve Class A suburban trams.

== Network ==
A map of the tram network in 1939. Dark blue lines were built by KES.

KES operated a network consisting of a common line through the city center, three branches, a suburban line and three connections to KSS's network. The street tram network consisted of the Briskeby Line, the Skøyen Line and the Frogner Line. The Skøyen Line continued as the suburban Lilleaker Line. All of KES's lines remain in operation. The company's common section of track originated at Jernbanetorget, the square outside Oslo East Station. The line started in Strandgata and continued along Tollbugata to Akersgata. From there it cut across Stortingsgata and continued along Drammensveien.

The Briskeby Line branches from the common section to Parkveien, where it took off onto Riddervolds gate and continued along Briskebyveien, Holtegata and Bogstadveien before reaching Majorstuen. The Skøyen Line runs along Drammensveien to Skøyen. From Skøyen the Lilleaker Line continued to Jar. The Lilleaker Line is a suburban light rail and runs in its own right-of-way along St. Edmunds vei, Bestumveien and Jonas Dahls vei. The Frogner Line branched from the Skøyen Line at the intersection of Drammensveien and Frognerveiien at Solli plass, just after the Skøyen Line and the Briskeby Line split. The Frogner Line runs along Frognerveien to Frogner plass, the original terminus. Since 1914 the line has continued along Kirkeveien to Majorstuen.

The company operated one depot—Majorstuen Depot. It consisted of three buildings, the largest of which had room for 75 vehicles. It also featured the coal-fired thermal power station used to generate the electricity for the tramway. Majorstuen was the site of the company's administration, as well as the depot for Holmenkolbanen. Most of KES facilities have been demolished, but one hall remains and is used by the Oslo Tramway Museum.

== Rolling stock ==
The company bought a total 78 motor cars and 66 trailers; 20 of the motorized vehicles were later converted to trailers. The deliveries were from various manufacturers, most of which were German. The sole Norwegian body manufacturer was Skabo. The trams were of three generations, each with their own class designation. Many of the trams were of the same class as those delivered to KSS. KES's trams were painted blue, hence giving rise to their nickname, the "Blue Tramway".

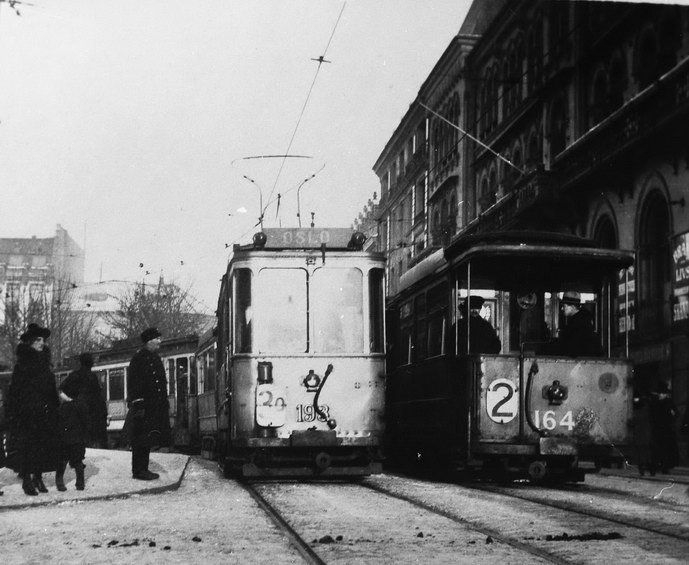
Class SS (193, left) and Class U (164) at Athenæum in Akersgata in 1912

The first class of trams, Class A, were manufactured by Allgemeine Elektrizitäts Gesellschaft (AEG) and P. Herbrand & Cie., both of Germany. The undercarriages were built by Bergische Stahlindustri. They featured open platform bays and a cabin. Twenty units were built, with nearly the same specifications. The trams were 6.5 meters (21 ft) long and 2.0 meters (6 ft 7 in) wide. They weighed 6 tonnes (5.9 long tons; 6.6 short tons) and were equipped with two NB80 motors with a combined effect of 12 kilowatts (16 hp). The exception was three units, no. 118 through 120, which had more powerful VBN120 motors, with a combined 36 kilowatts (48 hp). They had seating for sixteen and standing room for twelve. The company also had thirty-two similar trailer units built by Herbrand. One of the trams, no. 117, was a prototype built by Skabo with motors from Norsk Elektrisk & Brown Boveri.

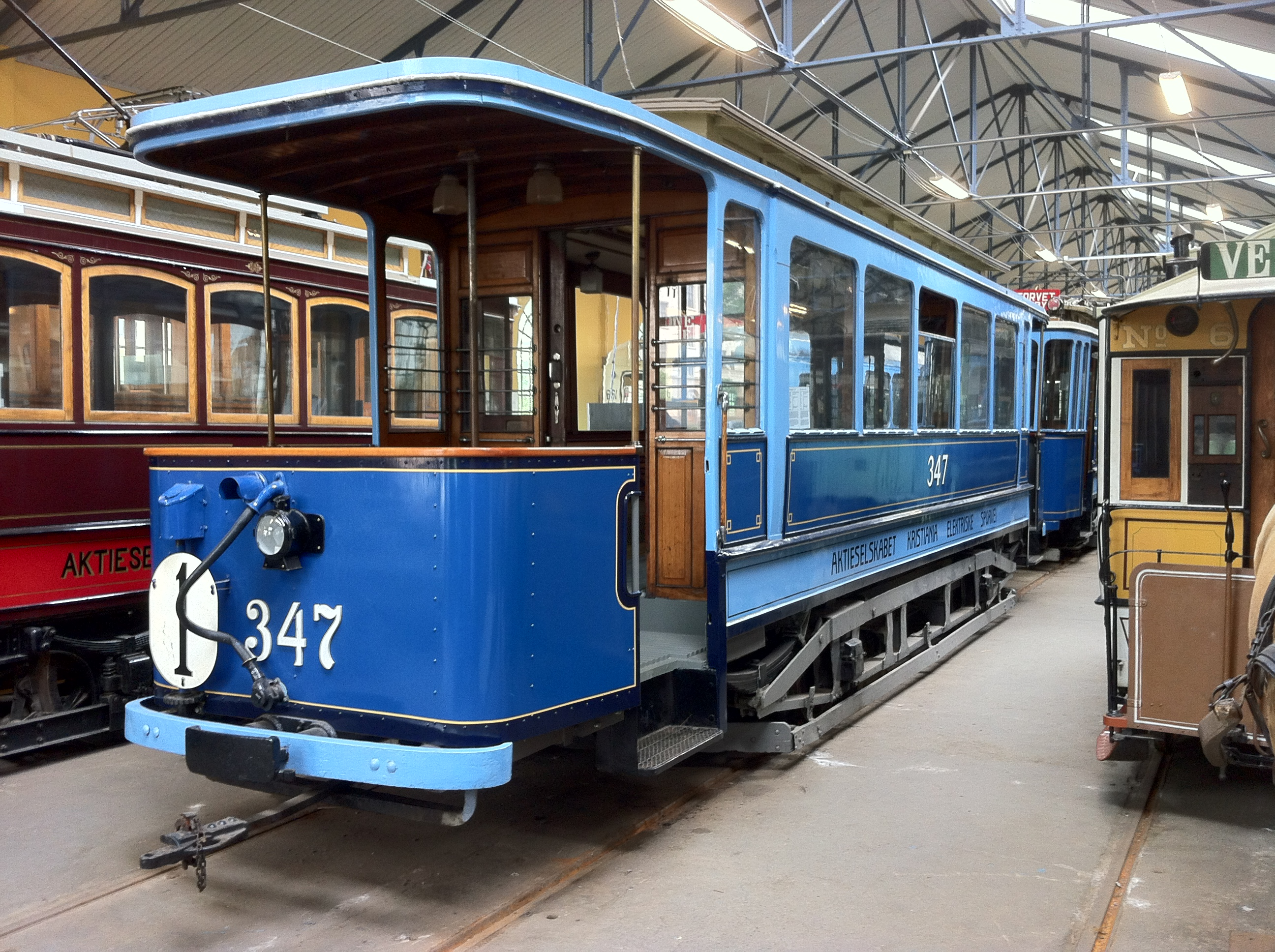
Trailer 347 on display in the original Blue Tram colors at Oslo Tramway Museum

Twenty-four Class U trams were delivered between 1899 and 1906. The electrical components were built by Union-Elektricitäts-Gesellschaft and the bodies by Falkenried and Skabo. The trams had two GE52 motors with a combined power output of 36 kilowatts (48 hp) and had a total weight of 10.2 tonnes (10.0 long tons; 11.2 short tons). They were 7.8 meters (26 ft) long and were built with open platform bays. Each unit had capacity for twenty seated and fourteen standing passengers. Two units were in 1924 rebuilt to create an articulated tram. However, it proved prone to derailment in poorly banked S-curves and was never put into revenue service.

KES took delivery of thirty-four Class SS motorized trams and twenty-two trailers between 1909 and 1914. They had electrical components from Siemens-Schukertwerke and were variously built by Herbrand, Falkenried and Skabo. Their main innovation was that the wheelbase was increased from 180 to 360 centimeters (71 to 142 in), allowing for a lengthening of the body. The first eleven were 9.69 meters (31.8 ft) long, while the rest were 11.47 meters (37.6 ft) long. The first eight units had two D72v motors, giving a combined power output of 72 kilowatts (97 hp). Later units had a power output of 84 kilowatts (113 hp).

The second delivered unit, no. 102, has been preserved by the Norwegian Museum of Science and Technology. Two SS motor units, no. 307 from 1913 and no. 322 from 1918, and one trailer, no. 347, have been preserved by the Oslo Tramway Museum.

== Bibliography ==
- Aspenberg, Nils Carl (1994). Trikker og forstadsbaner i Oslo (in Norwegian). Oslo: Baneforlaget. ISBN 82-91448-03-5.
- Bærumsbanen (1944). Bærumsbanen 1919–1944 (in Norwegian).
- Fasting, Kåre (1975). Sporveier i Oslo gjennom 100 år: 1875–1975 (in Norwegian). Oslo: Grøhdal & Søn. ISBN 82-504-0116-6.
- Fristad, Hans Andreas (1990). Oslo-trikken – storbysjel på skinner (in Norwegian). Oslo: Gyldendal. ISBN 82-05-19084-4.
- Hartmann, Eivind; Mangset, Øistein (2001). Neste stopp!: Verneplan for bygninger (in Norwegian). Oslo: Baneforlaget. ISBN 82-91448-17-5.
- Strandholt, Thorleif (1990). A/S Kristiania elektriske sporvei : Lilleakerbanen åpnet 9. mai 1919 overtatt 1924 av A/S Bærumsbanen; A/S Akersbanene stiftet 7. juni 1917; Østensjøbanen, åpnet 18. desember 1923 som opphørte/overtatt 1949 av A/S Bærumsbanen, stiftet 1. mai 1924 som ble overtatt 1971 av A/S Oslo Sporveier (in Norwegian). Copenhagen: Sporvejshistorisk Selskab. ISBN 8787589311.
