= Skøyen tram stop =

Tram stop in Norway

Skøyen
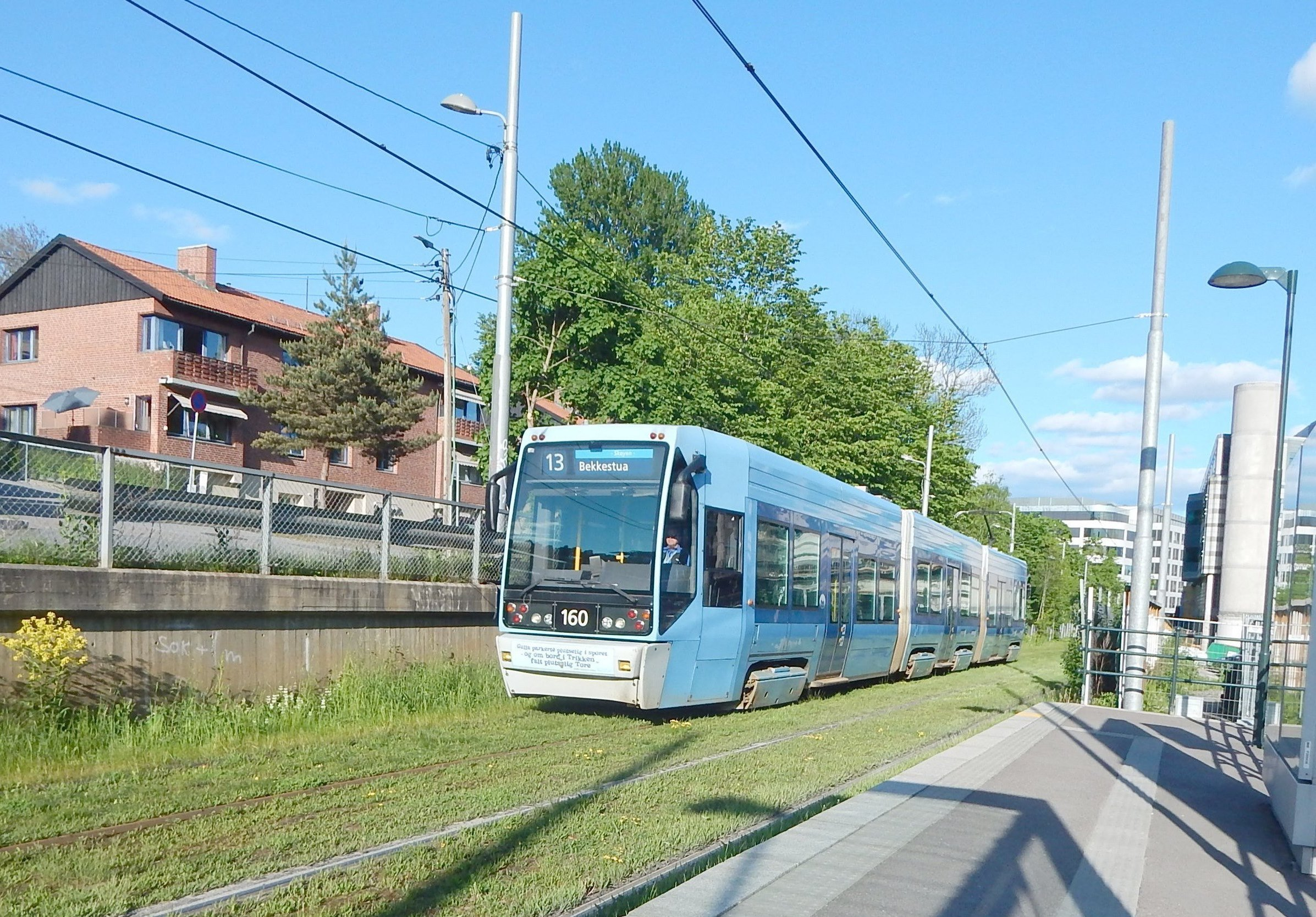

General information
- Location: Skøyen, Oslo; Norway
- Coordinates: 59.923839°N 10.680341°E
- Lines: Lilleaker Line; Skøyen Line
- Connections: Train: Skøyen Station; Bus: 130 Sandvika 140 Bekkestua

History
- Opened: 21 June 1903
Location

Skøyen is a light rail station on the Oslo Tramway. It is served by Line 13 and located between Thune and Hoff.

Located at Skøyen, it was opened by Kristiania Elektriske Sporvei as an extension of the Skøyen Line on 21 June 1903. In 1919, it also became the first station on the Lilleaker Line. It is served by line 13. About 100 metres (300 ft) away is Skøyen station on the Drammen Line, that is served by Vy and the Airport Express Train. The two stations are not adjacent, but within easy walking distance.

Preceding station	Trams in Oslo	Following station
Hoff towards Bekkestua	Line 13	Thune towards Ljabru
