= Skøyen Line =

Tramway line in Oslo, Norway

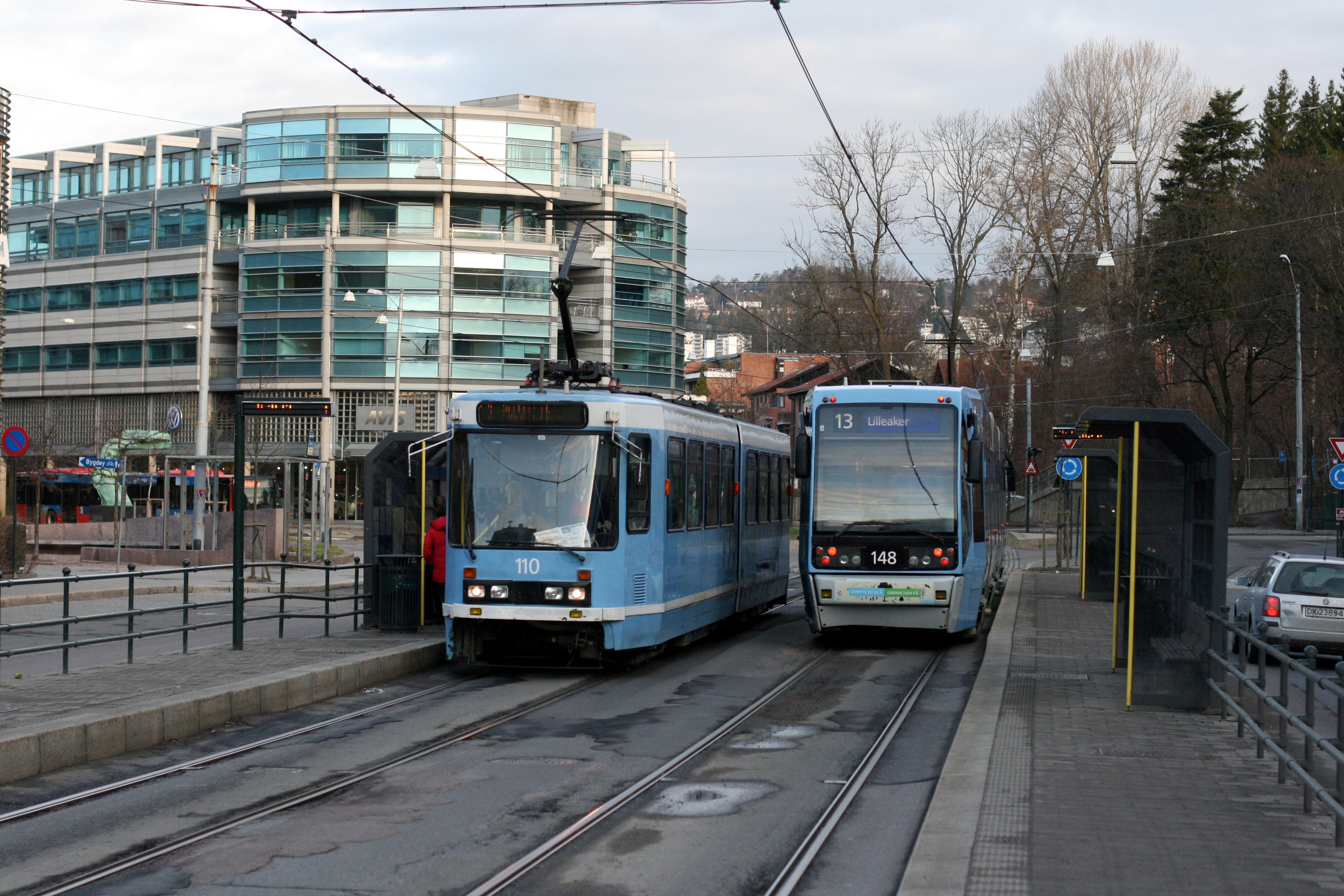
- Thune

Overview
- Native name: Skøyenlinjen/Skøyenlinja
- Owner: Kollektivtransportproduksjon
- Locale: Oslo, Norway
- Termini: Slottsparken; Skøyen

Service
- Type: Tramway
- System: Oslo Tramway
- Operator(s): Oslo Sporvognsdrift
- Rolling stock: SL95

History
- Opened: 2 March 1894

Technical
- Number of tracks: Double
- Track gauge: 1,435 mm (4 ft 8 1/2 in)
- Electrification: 750 V DC
- Operating speed: 50 km/h (31 mph)

The Skøyen Line (Norwegian: Skøyenlinjen/Skøyenlinja) is a tramway line running from Slottsparken to Skøyen in Oslo, Norway. It is served by line 13 of the Oslo Tramway. It connects the Briskeby Line at Slottsparken to the Lilleaker Line at Skøyen.

The line was built on 2 March 1894 from Slottsparken to Skarpsno, and extended to Skøyen in 1903, by Kristiania Elektriske Sporvei. At first a shuttle service was provided on the branch line, but by April a through service was offered to Østbanen. The Skillebekk Line was extended on 31 December 1894 to Nobels gate, to Thune in 1901 and to Skøyen on 21 June 1903. On 9 May 1919 the Lilleaker Line was built from Skøyen to Lilleaker, as a suburban line.
