= Schultz' gate tram stop =

Tram stop in Oslo, Norway

Schultz' gate
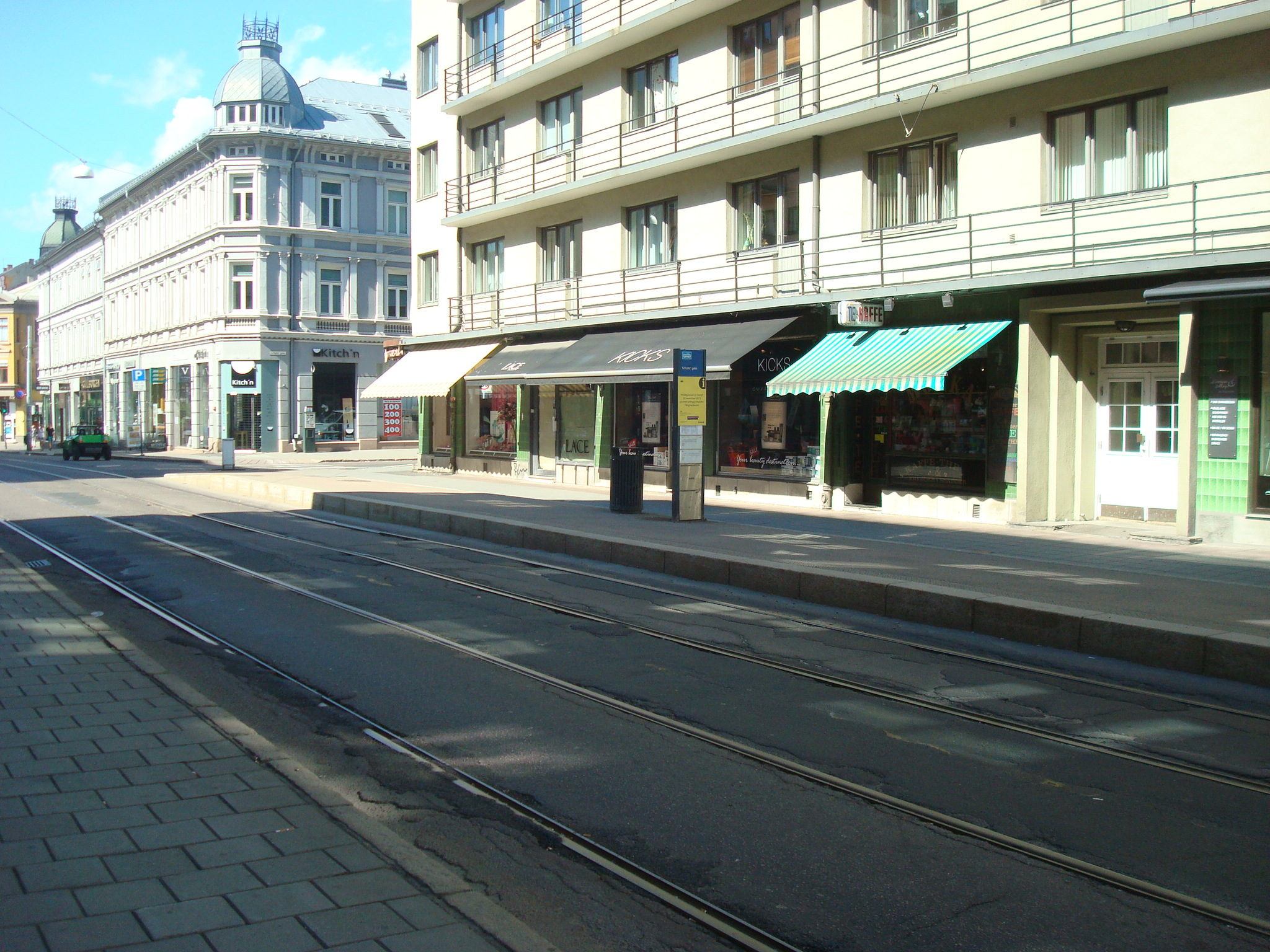

General information
- Location: Majorstuen, Oslo; Norway
- Coordinates: 59°55′37″N 10°43′13″E
- Line: Briskeby Line
Location

Schultz' gate station was a tram stop on the Oslo Tramway located in the Bogstadveien Street. It was preceded by the Majorstuen stop and succeeded by Rosenborg stop on the Briskeby Line. In 2014, the Rosenborg and Schultz' gate stops were merged with the newly established Bogstadveien, located between those stops.

Preceding station	Trams in Oslo	Following station
Majorstuen Terminus	Line 11	Homansbyen towards Kjelsås
Majorstuen Terminus	Line 19	Rosenborg towards Ljabru
