= Briskeby (disambiguation) =

Briskeby or Briskebyen may refer to:

- Briskeby, a band
- Briskeby, Oslo, a neighborhood of Oslo, Norway
  - Briskeby Line, part of the Oslo Tramway
- Briskebyen, Oppland, a neighborhood of Gjøvik, Norway
- Briskebyen, Hedmark, a neighborhood of Hamar, Norway
  - Briskeby Arena, a football stadium in Hamar, Norway
  - Briskebyen FL, a former football team from Hamar, see History of Hamarkameratene
