= Solli =

Solli may refer to:

- Solli (surname)
- Solli plass, a square in Oslo, Norway
  - Solli tram stop, an Oslo Tramway station
- FC Solli Plyus Kharkiv, an amateur football club from Kharkiv, Ukraine
