= Rosenborg tram stop (original) =

Former tram stop in Oslo, Norway

Rosenborg

General information
- Location: Rosenborg, Oslo; Norway
- Coordinates: 59°55′30″N 10°43′24″E
- Line: Briskeby Line
Location

Rosenborg (Urban East Norwegian: [ˈrùːsn̩bɔrɡ]) was a tram stop on the Oslo Tramway. It was located on the shopping street Bogstadveien, in the area of the same name in the neighbourhood Hegdehaugen. The station was preceded by Schultz' gate on the Briskeby Line and succeeded by Homansbyen and Uranienborgveien on the Homansby and Briskeby Line, respectively. In 2005, the station was upgraded, with heightened platforms, new skeds and real-time monitors. In 2014, the stop was closed and replaced by the newly established Bogstadveien stop, located a bit further north on the Bogstadveien street, closer to Majorstuen. The succeeding Uranienborg stop was relocated to the street junction between Bogstadveien and Josefines gate, and renamed Rosenborg.

== See also ==
- Bogstadveien tram stop
- Briskeby Line
- Homansbyen Line

Preceding station	Trams in Oslo	Following station
Schultz' gate towards Majorstuen	Line 11	Homansbyen towards Kjelsås
Schultz' gate towards Majorstuen	Line 19	Uranienborgveien towards Ljabru
