= Bogstadveien =

Street in Oslo

Coordinates: 59°55′38″N 10°43′13″E

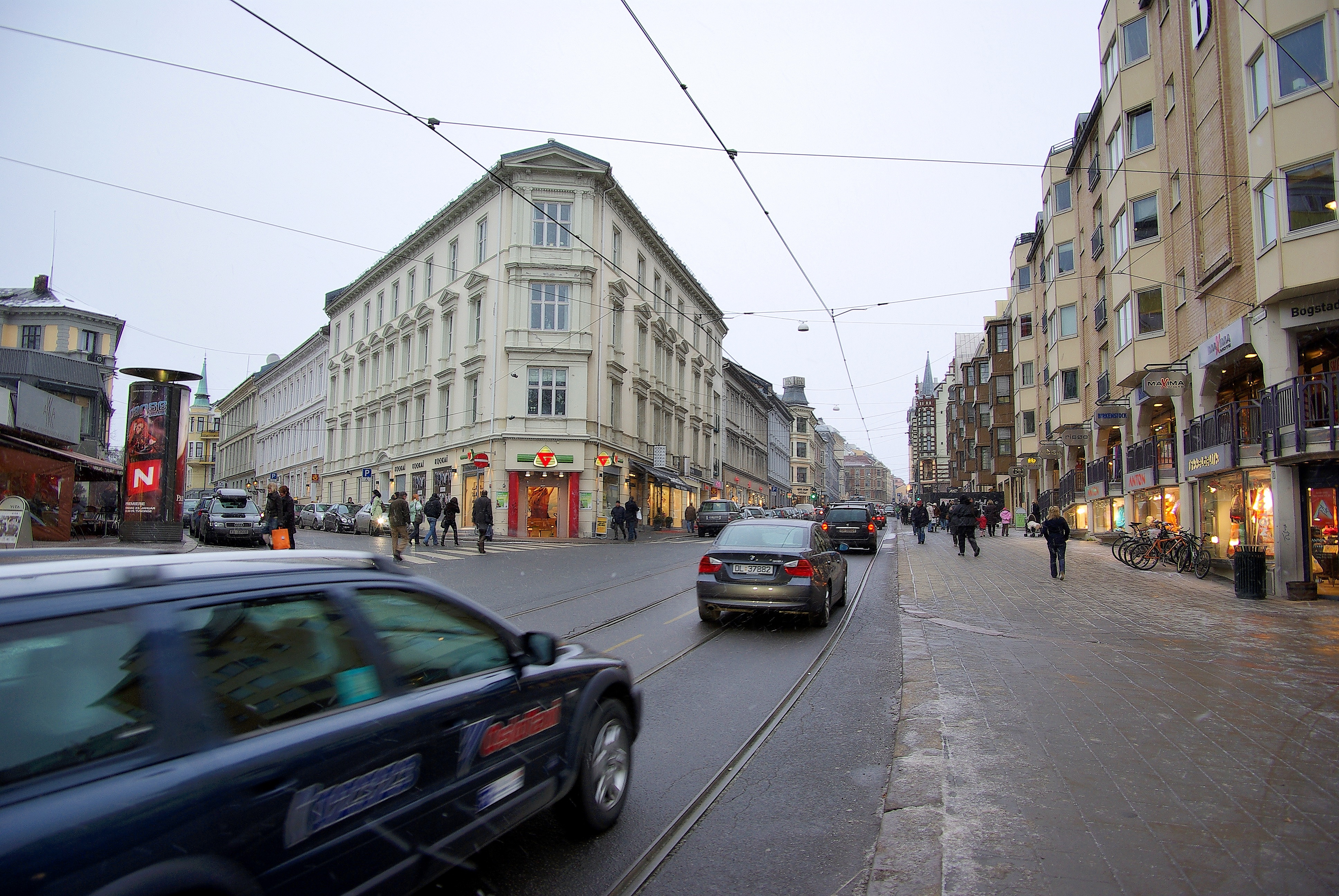
Bogstadveien

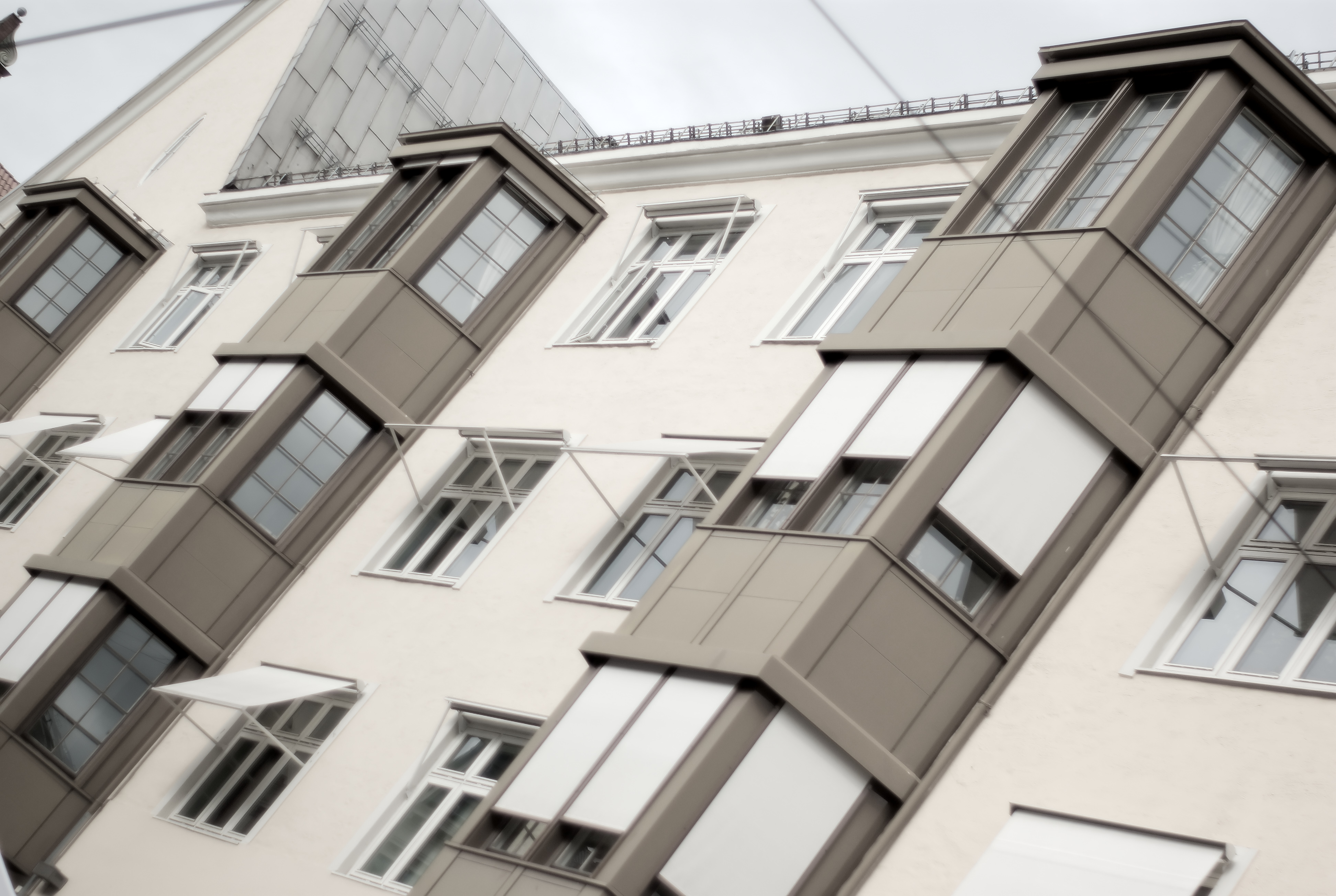
Building facade on Bogstadveien

Bogstadveien is a street in the district of Frogner in Oslo, Norway. It is considered a central business district and features many of the city's wide range of exclusive shops as well as entertainment, hotels and restaurants. The road is known for the frequent Farmer's Markets on weekends as well as its biannual car-free shopping events.

Bogstadveien stretches from the neighbourhood Majorstuen to the neighbourhood Hegdehaugen. The street was originally named Sørkedalsveien as it led to Sørkedalen, but was renamed to Bogstadveien when, in 1878, it was incorporated into Oslo. It was named for the Bogstad Manor in Sørkedalen.

In 1892, the street was extended in width to serve as the main street towards Majorstuen. On 2 March 1894, the first electric tramway line in Oslo, the Briskeby Line, was opened. The line runs through almost the entirety of the street, and has a single stop named for it, located by the street junction with Industrigaten. Previously the street was served by two stops, named Schultz' gate and Rosenborg, but these were replaced by the eponymous Bogstadveien stop, due to their proximity. In 1892, the street's width was extended to serve as an avenue from the Royal Palace. In 1932, the two last wooden houses in the street were demolished.

The writer Aasmund Olavsson Vinje lived in one of these houses, where he became friends with the painter Peder Balke. The writer Peter Christen Asbjørnsen also lived for a while in a house at the intersection of Bogstadveien and Rosenborggaten Street.
