= Frogner Line =

Section of Trikken i Oslo

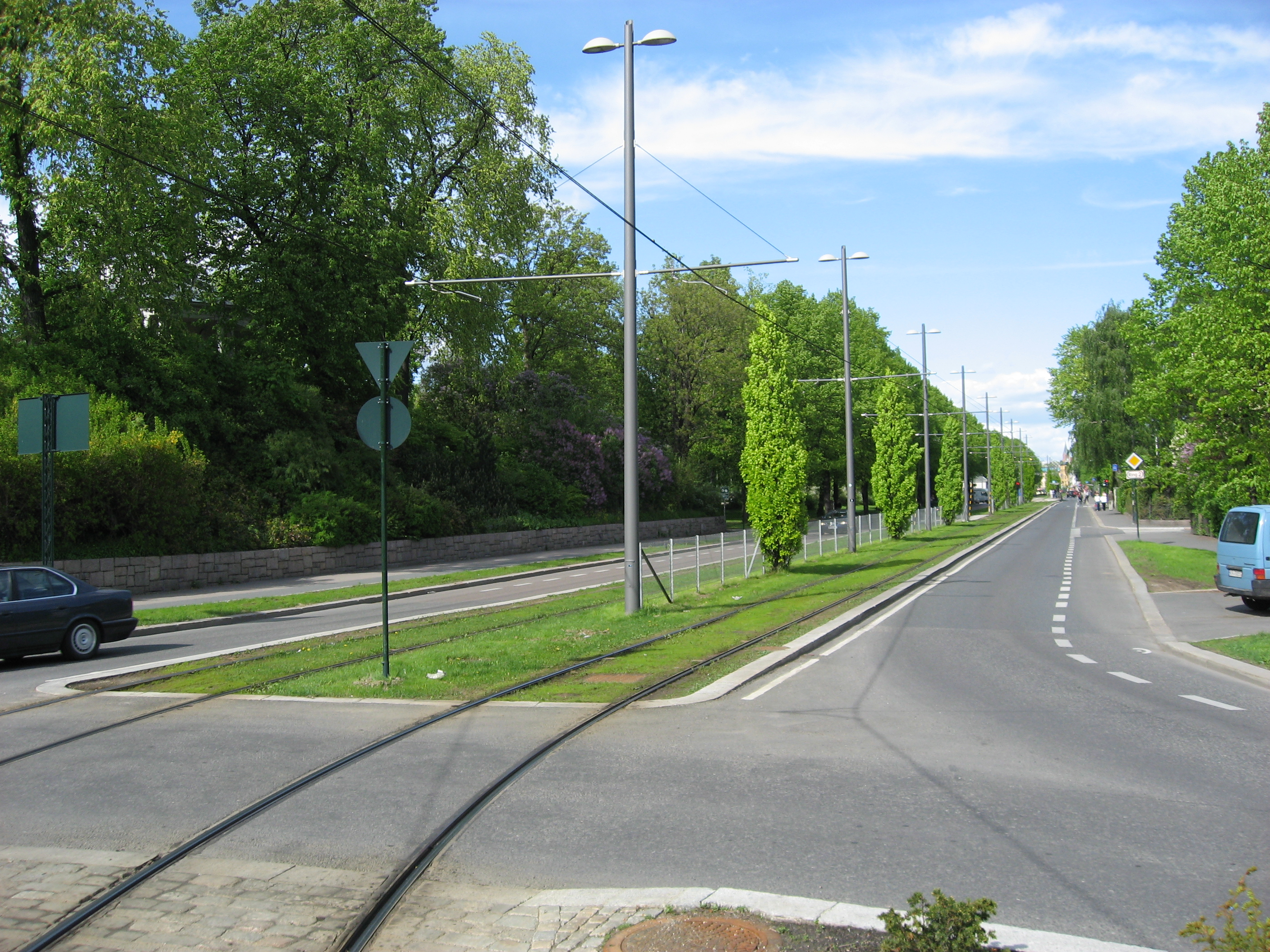
- Kirkeveien from Frogner plass

Overview
- Native name: Frognerlinjen
- Owner: Kollektivtransportproduksjon
- Locale: Oslo, Norway
- Termini: Solli plass; Majorstuen

Service
- Type: Tramway
- System: Oslo Tramway
- Operator(s): Oslo Sporvognsdrift
- Rolling stock: SL79

History
- Opened: 1902

Technical
- Number of tracks: Double
- Track gauge: 1,435 mm (4 ft 8 1/2 in)
- Electrification: 750 V DC
- Operating speed: 50 kilometres per hour (31 mph)

The Frogner Line (Norwegian: Frognerlinjen) is a section of the Oslo Tramway which runs between Solli and Majorstuen, serving the neighborhood of Frogner. The line is served by tram number 12, and the Frogner section makes up the westernmost part of this line. From Solli to Frogner, the line runs northwestwards to Frognerveien, then turns northeast along Kirkeveien, along the Frogner Park, including a stop at the main gate to the Vigeland sculpture installation, before ending at Majorstuen where it connects with the Homansbyen Line and Briskeby Line.

The southern part of the line was opened in 1902 to Frogner. The extension between Frogner and Majorstuen was opened in 1914 in connection with the 1914 Jubilee Exhibition at Frogner.

The balloon loop at Frogner was removed since it caused the intersection to become rather cluttered, although the tram company had expressed a desire to keep the loop. The line underwent major upgrades in 2005 although a mistake with the track elevation jeopardized scheduled reopening.
