= Rosenborg tram stop =

Tram stop in Oslo, Norway

Uranienborgveien
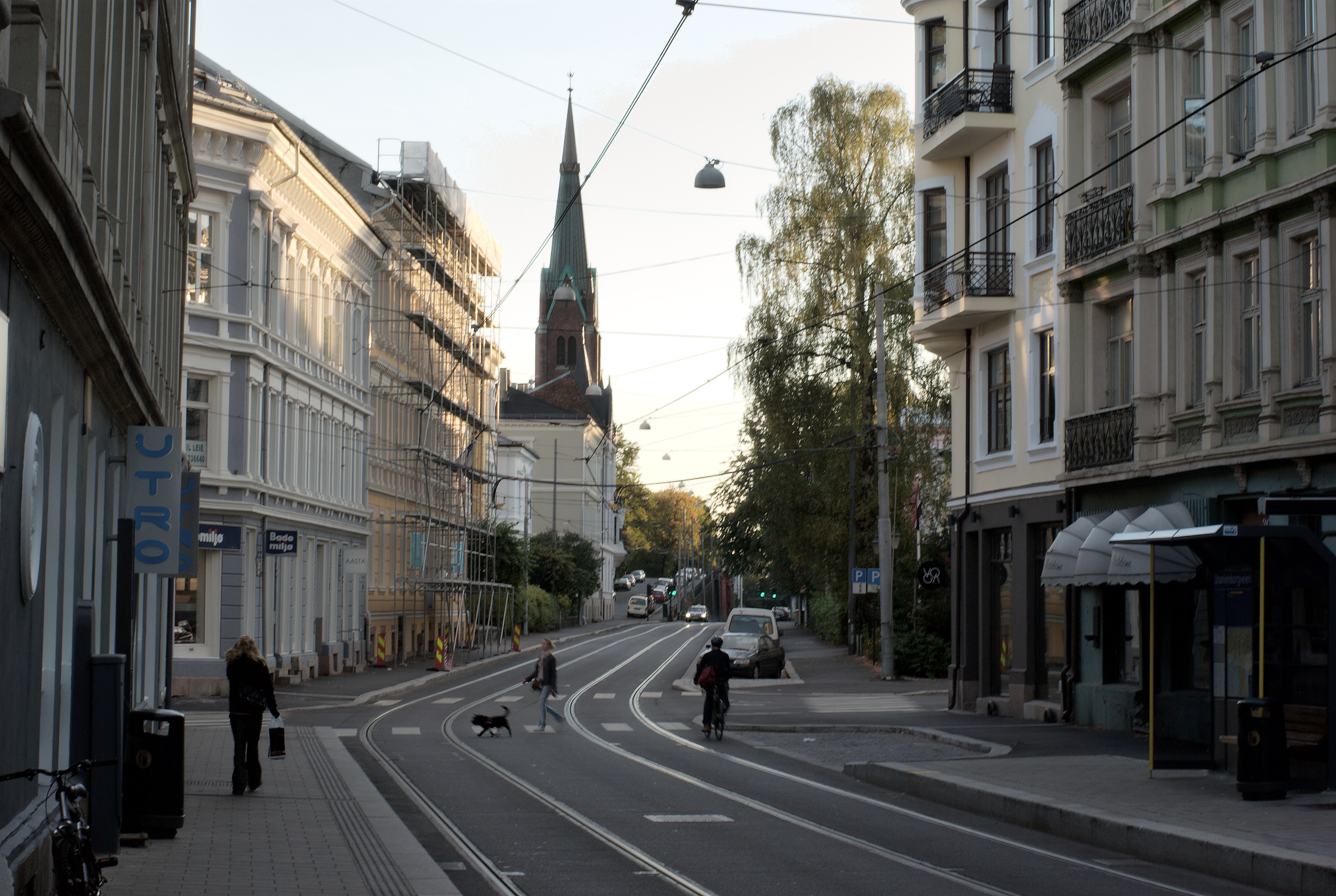
- View towards Uranienborg Church

General information
- Location: Hegdehaugen, Oslo; Norway
- Coordinates: 59°55′27″N 10°43′26″E
- Line: Briskeby Line

Services
Preceding station	Trams in Oslo	Following station
Bogstadveien towards Majorstuen	Line 11	Briskeby towards Kjelsås
Location

Rosenborg, formerly Uranienborgveien is at the tram stop on the Briskeby Line of the Oslo Tramway. It is located at Josefines gate, close to its street junction with Bogstadveien. It serves the neighborhoods Rosenborg, Hegdehaugen and Uranienborg in the West End of Oslo. The station is preceded and succeeded by Bogstadveien and Briskeby, respectively. The station used to be near the junction of Holtegata and Uranienborgveien streets, but it was moved towards Hegdehaugen and Rosenborg in 2009, after the line had been upgraded and reconstructed. In 2014, it was moved even further towards Rosenborg, and consequently renamed. In the same move, the former Rosenborg stop was replaced with the newly established Bogstadveien stop, situated further north, closer to Majorstuen.
