= Inkognitogata tram stop =

Tram station in Oslo, Norway

Inkognitogata
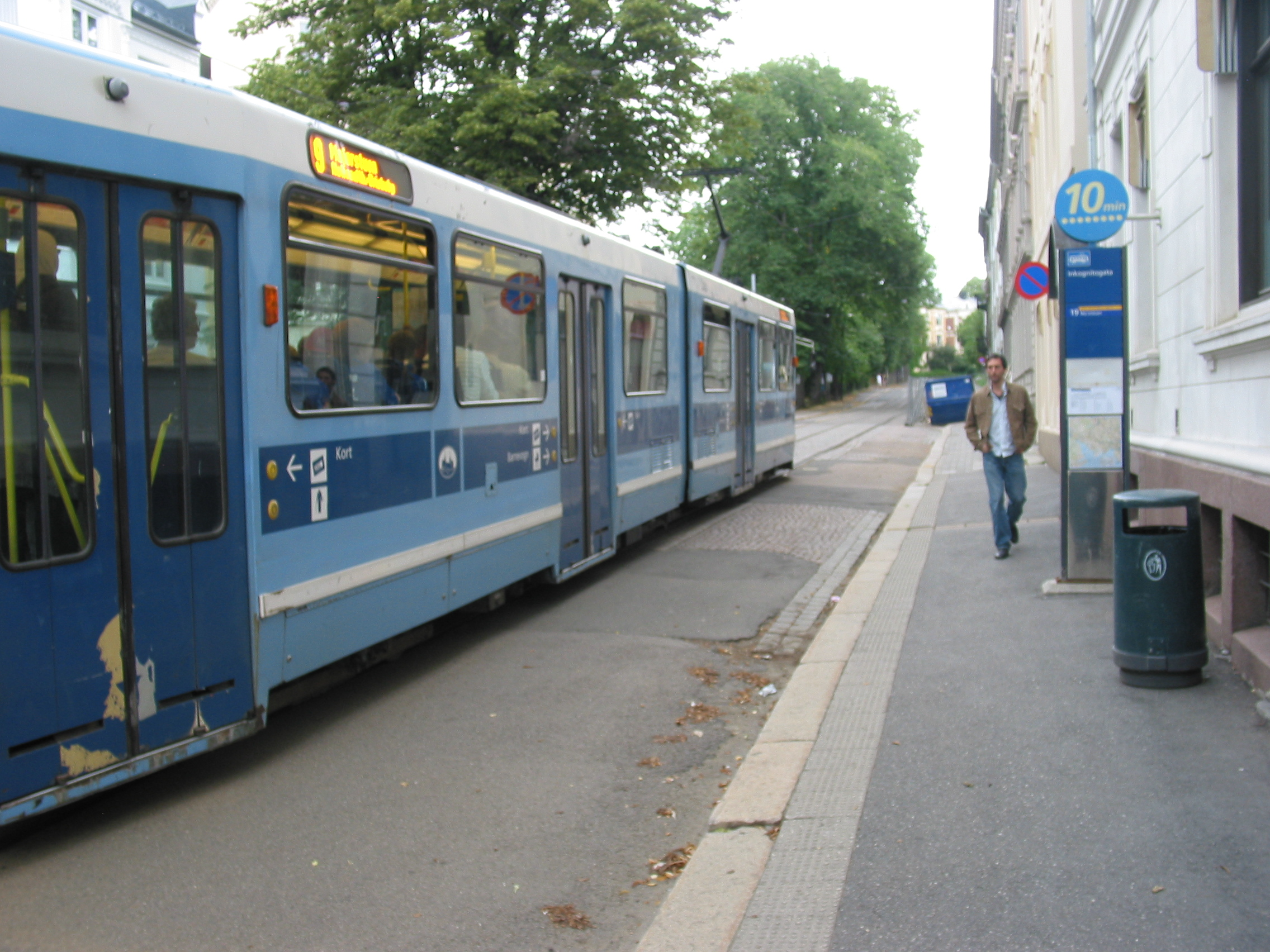
- Inkognitogata station in Oslo

General information
- Coordinates: 59°54′57″N 10°43′16″E
- Line: Briskeby Line

Services
| Preceding station | Trams in Oslo | Following station |
|---|---|---|
| Riddervolds plass towards Majorstuen | Line 11 | Nationaltheatret towards Kjelsås |
Location

Inkognitogata is a tram stop on the Briskeby Line (Briskebylinjen) in Oslo, Norway. Inkognitogata is a street which begins at Uranienborg Road and follows Slottsparken all the way towards the Oslofjord, to Henrik Ibsens gate (formerly Drammensveien). The tram station is situated between Riddervolds plass and Nationaltheatret. It is serviced by line 11, which is served by SL79 trams. It's also possible to transfer to the stop Solli (Platforms A and B).

== See also ==
- Trams in Oslo
