= Briskeby Line =

Line of the Oslo Tramway in Norway

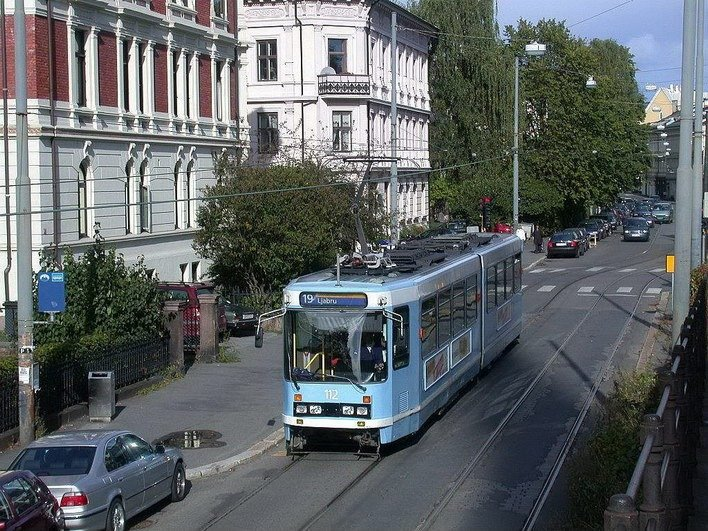
- SL79 tram at Uranienborgveien

Overview
- Native name: Briskebylinjen
- Status: Operating
- Owner: Sporveien
- Locale: Oslo, Norway
- Termini: Dronningens gate; Majorstuen

Service
- Type: Tramway
- System: Oslo Tramway
- Operator(s): Sporveien Trikken
- Rolling stock: SL79

History
- Opened: 3 March 1894

Technical
- Number of tracks: Double
- Track gauge: 1,435 mm (4 ft 8 1/2 in) standard gauge
- Electrification: 750 V DC overhead line
- Operating speed: 50 km/h (31 mph)

The Briskeby Line (Norwegian: Briskebylinjen) is a line of the Oslo Tramway in Norway. It runs westwards from Jernbanetorget in the city center, passing through the neighborhoods of Briskeby and Uranienborg before reaching its terminus at Majorstuen. The section from Jernbanetorget to Inkognitogata is shared with the Skøyen Line; on this section it connects with the important transport hub Nationatheatret. This part is variously served by route 11, 12 and 13. From the Inkognitogata stop, the line moves through the residential areas around the Royal Palace, in the streets named Riddervolds gate, Briskebyveien, Holtegata and Bogstadveien. The part of the line in Bogstadveien from Majorstuen to Rosenborg is also served by route 19, which operates the Homansbyen Line.

When Kristiania Elektriske Sporvei opened the line on 3 March 1894, it was the first electric tramway in Scandinavia. Originally the line ran through Parkveien instead of Inkognitogata and was mostly single track. The tracks were upgraded to double track in 1898, when the right-of-way was moved to Inkognitogata. The connection to the Ullevål Hageby Line was established in 1912 through Hegdehaugsveien, creating the short branch called the Homansbyen Line. The line was acquired by Oslo Sporveier in 1924. The Briskeby Line is now served by Line 11. The transit agency Ruter has proposed that parts of the route be realigned to run through Skovveien, so that the trams may serve Solli plass.

== Route ==
The Briskeby Line consists of a shared section with the Skøyen Line from Jernbanetorget until it leaves Henrik Ibsens gate at Inkognitogata, just before Solli plass. This segment is known as the Southern String. West-bound trams run along Fred. Olsens gate and Prinsens gate before reaching Stortingsgata. East-bound trams run from Stortingsgata along Nedre Vollgate, Tollbugata and Strandgata to Jernbanetorget. Along these sections there are three stations: Dronningens gate (east-bound only), Kongens gate (west-bound only) and Wessels plass (east-bound only). There is a connection to Stortorvet through Kirkegata (west-bound) and Kongens gate (east-bound). The Vika Line deviates from the Briskeby Line through Akersgata.

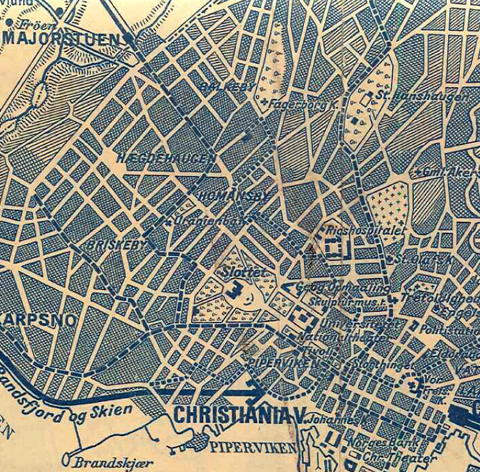
Early 20th-century map of the line. It still follows the same route.

The concurrent section continued along Stortingsgata, where it passes Nationaltheatret. It then turns onto Henrik Ibsens gate (previously known as Drammensveien) and passes Slottsparken. The concurrent section ends at the intersection of Inkognitogata, where the Briskeby Line turns off and the Skøyen Line continues onwards to Solli.

The Briskeby Line continues along Inkognitogata, where there is an eponymous station. It turns onto Riddervolds gata, where there is a station at Riddervolds plass. The line crosses Skovveien onto Briskebyveien, which it follows past the station Briskeby. It then turns onto Holtegata, where it serves the station of Uranienborg. There is a branch through Professor Dahls gate which allows trams to reach the Ullevål Hageby Line.

The main line continues another block and turns onto Bogstadveien, where it connects with the Homansbyen Line. On this section it serves the eponymous Bogstadveien stop, which replaced the earlier Rosenborg and Schultz' gate. The line continues along Valkyriegata for the very last bit before turning onto Kirkeveien and reaching Majorstuen. At Majorstuen the line can return as a turning loop through Bogstadveien. It also intersects with the Frogner Line, which continues to run along Kirkeveien. Via Valkyriegata there is a branch to the Oslo Tramway Museum and the closed Majorstuen Depot, which is no longer operational and also partially covered in asphalt.

== Services ==
From Jernbanetorget the shared section is served by lines 11, 12 and 13. Line 12 branches off onto the Vika Line at Akersgata. Lines 11 and 13 continue along the main branch to Inkognitogata, at which point line 13 crosses over Solli Plass before following the Skøyen Line to Jar and Bekkestua in Bærum. Line 11 on the other hand moves onto the Briskeby Line proper, on which part it serves the stations Inkognitogata, Riddervolds plass, Briskeby and Rosenborg. At Rosenborg it connects with line 19, and from this junction they both continue to the terminus Majorstuen, also the endpoint of the Frogner Line. All lines operate with a ten-minute headway during most of the day.

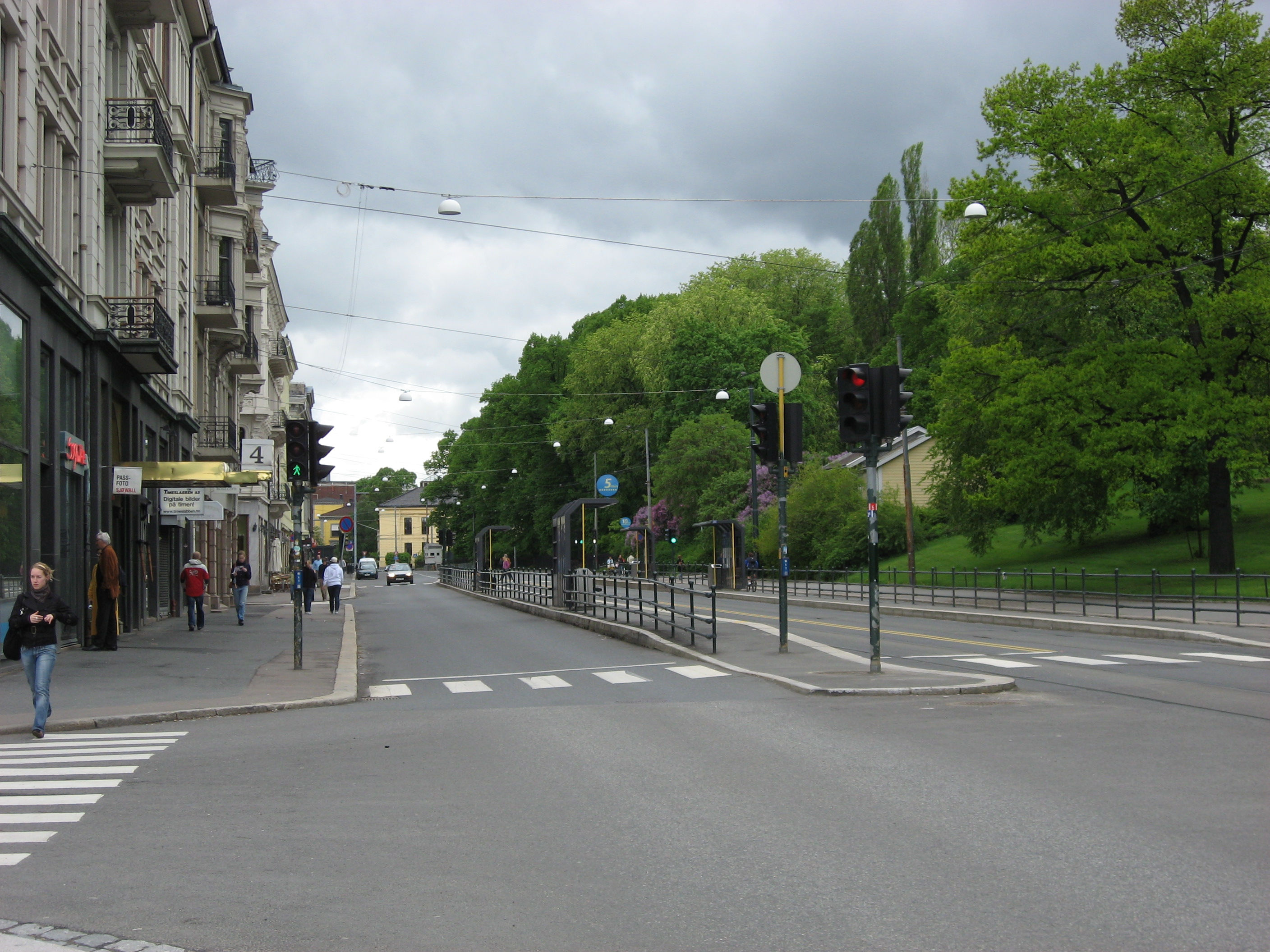
The former stop at Slottsparken

At Nationaltheatret and Majorstuen there is transfer to all lines of the Oslo Metro. Mainline railway services are provided at Nationaltheatret Station and Oslo Central Station—the latter located adjacent to Jernbanetorget. The latter site is also a transfer hub granting access to all lines of the Oslo Tramway. Although from 4 October 2020; Line 13 does not stop at Jernbanetorget, but Dronningens gate.

Services are carried out by Sporveien Trikken, which operates SL79 trams on lines 11 and 19. These trams are owned by Oslo Vognselskap. Ownership and maintenance of the infrastructure are the responsibilities of Sporveien, a municipal company which also owns the operator. Services are ordered and coordinated by the transit agency Ruter.

== History ==
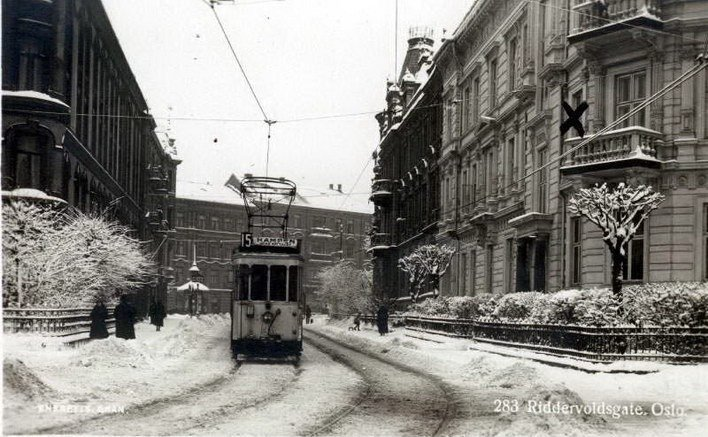
Class H tram in Riddervolds gate in 1926

The Oslo Tramway was established as a horsecar network in 1875 by Kristiania Sporveisselskab (1875). In 1887 it rejected a proposal for L. Samson, a real estate developer, to build a line to Majorstuen to serve his projects. He therefore contacted engineers H. E. Heyerdal and A. Fenger-Krog, the latter who had studied tramways abroad. They sent an application that year to the municipality, at a time when there were no other electric tramways in operation in Europe. However, the application did not explicitly state that the company would use electric traction.

The group received permission to build two lines, one from Jernbanetorget to Majorstuen and a branch to Skøyen, a total distance of 6 kilometers (3.7 mi). Use of overhead wires had been discouraged by the city engineer, but he later changed his mind after a trip to Germany. The issue was decided upon by the municipal council on 19 May 1892. Six companies bid to deliver trams and electrical equipment; Allgemeine Elektrizitäts Gesellschaft (AEG) won and delivered seven Class A motor trams and five trailers. Investments totaled NOK 817,572.

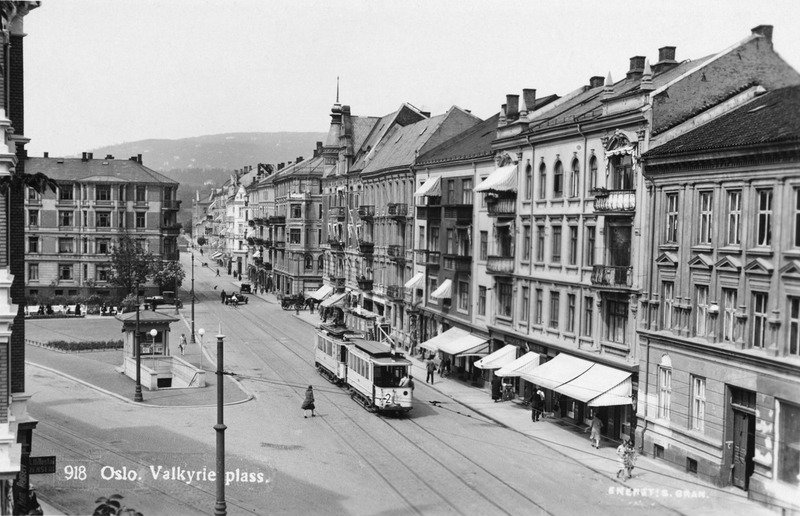
Tram at Valkyrie plass in the second half of the 1940

Trial runs on the line commenced on 10 January 1894, at first between the depot and corner of Bogstadveien and Sorgenfriveien. Motorman courses were carried out by AEG from 15 January to 16 February. The first trip to the Queen's Park was carried out on 17 February and the first run to Jernbanetorget was completed on 20 February. The official opening took place on 2 March 1894 and operations commenced the following day. The Briskeby Line was the first electric tramway in the Nordic Countries. The Skøyen Line to Fredrik Stangs gate opened the same day. The same year a tram driver on the line received Norway's first ever speeding ticket for exceeding the speed limit of 18 kilometres per hour (11 mph).

Services were initially provided using Class A trams. The motormen were to both drive and sell tickets, but this was found to be too much work for one person to do efficiently. Conductors were therefore introduced almost immediately. Originally services consisted of a tram from Majorstuen to Jerbanetorget every six minutes. At Parkveien there was a transfer between the Skøyen and Briskeby Line. This proved a difficult, as trams from Majorstuen were full and most passengers were forced to walk into town. Therefore, from April KES introduced direct services from Skillebekk on the Skøyen Line to Jernbanetorget. It quickly turned out the company had too few trams and four more were delivered by the end of the year.

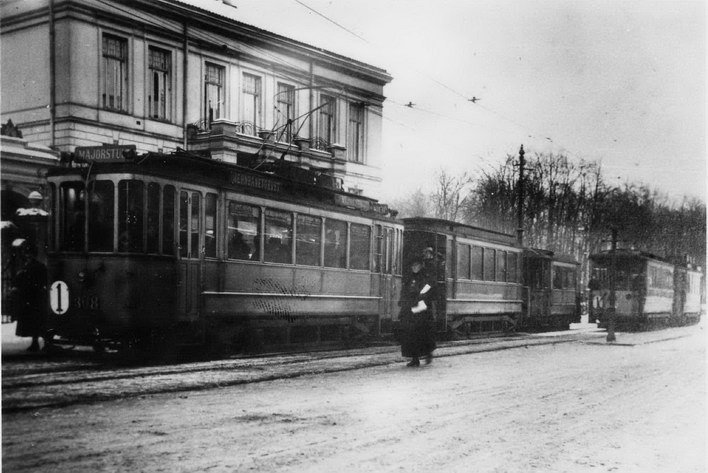
Class SS trams at the Nobel Institute in the late 1910s

The line was built with single track and had passing loops at the intersections of Professor Dahls gate, Oscars gate, Huitfeldts gate, Tivoli and Nedre Slottsgate. These were not correctly placed to allow a speedy headway of six minutes—therefore this was changed to eight minutes on 2 November 1894. Services were extended from 07 to 01 hours every day from 1 November 1895.

Ahead of the Holmenkollen Line opening on 31 May 1898, the track was rearranged at Majorstuen. This involved laying double track from the intersection with Sorgenfrigata through Valkyrie gate to Majorstuen Depot. The station at Majorstuen was rebuilt to allow passengers to transfer between the KES trams and those operated by Holmenkolbanen. The same year KES realigned the line from Parkveien to Inkognitogata. This was after complaints concerning noise from the Royal Palace. As part of this the entire line was converted to double track and was taken into regular use on 24 October 1898. Trams ran every seven and a half minutes, with every other tram corresponding with a service on the Holmenkollen Line.

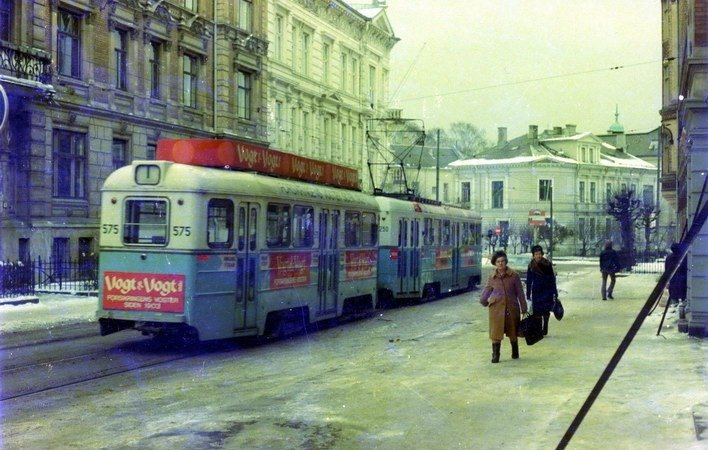
SM53 tram at Riddervolds gate in 1976

Larger Class U trams were introduced in 1899. Extra rush-hour services were introduced in 1906, although they only ran to Akersgata in the city center. A five-minute headway was introduced on 18 January 1909, with every other tram terminating in Akersgata. Class SS trams were introduced that year, accelerating the retirement of the Class A stock until they were completely retired in 1914. Line numbered were introduced on 4 September 1909. KES beat KSS to introduce this and received the lowest digits. The Briskeby service was thus given line number 1.

A balloon loop was installed at Jernbanetorget on 10 November 1909. KES and KSS reached an agreement in 1912 to coordinate their services better. This first materialized in a connecting line in Hegdehaugsveien, which allowed trams to run from Stortorvet via the Ullevål Hageby Line to Majorstuen. This as run such the Line 2 from the Frogner Line would combine with Line 6, which ran along Hegdehaugsveien to Stortorvet.

In conjunction with the 1914 Jubilee Exhibition, the Frogner Line was extended from Frogner plass to Majorstuen. It was officially opened on 15 May 1914. From the services became a ring line: Line 1 ran Jernbanetorget–Briskeby–Majorstuen–Frogner–Jernbanetorget, while Line 2 was designated to run the opposite direction. They were both run every five minutes. The circle scheme was ended on 15 December 1915 and the Briskeby Line again became Line 1. However, this was unpopular with the passengers and the circle service was reintroduced on 24 February 1916. Line 1 was extended from Jernbanetorget along the Gamlebyen Line between 17 December 1917 to 1 October 1918. Six-minute services were introduced from 25 March 1920, five-minute headways from 19 July 1920 and six-minute headways from 25 July 1921.

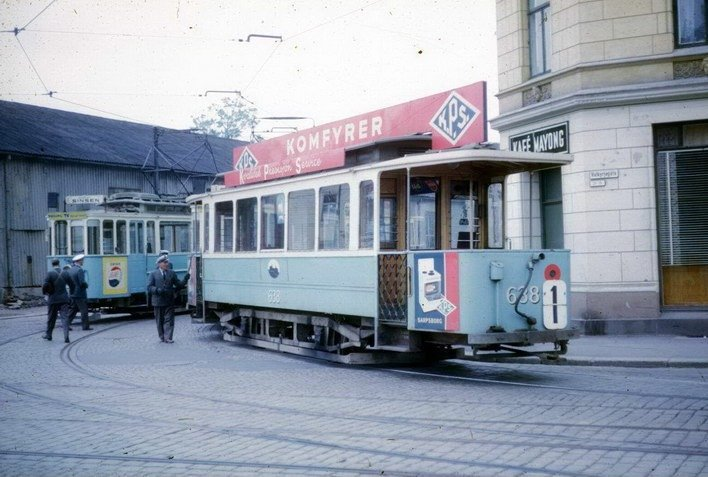
SS trailer in Valkyriegata in 1962

KES was merged with KSS on 1 May 1924 and the Briskeby Line became part of the municipal Oslo Sporveier. This resulted in a change of the routes, and the circle system was abandoned. However, the line was again extended along the Gamlebyen Line. From 9 May 1926 the line was moved from Tollbugata to Prinsens gate, as part of work on the sewer system in Tollbugata. From 6 June 1926 the two lines started serving Briskeby. Line 1 continued to Gamlebyen, while Line 10 ran to the Kampen Line. This lasted until 29 May 1927, when Line 1 instead ran via Homansbyen. From 1 January 1929 the headway was changed to 12 minutes, from 1932 every 15 minutes during summer.

Line 1 was reintroduced on the Briskeby Line on 30 August 1939. Trams would not turn at Majorstuen, but instead continue along the Frogner Line as Line 5. From 10 December 1939 Gullfisk trams were introduced on some of the services on the route. There were several places the tracks were too close and many sites where trams could not meet until new track was laid. The east-bound track in the city center was moved from Prinsens gate to Tollbugata on 15 December 1940. SM53 trams were introduced on some services on the line from 7 April 1953. From 6 September 1953 the combination of lines 1 and 5 was dropped and instead 1 and 2 were combined, allowing the circle through Majorstua to continue. The headway was reduced to 15 minutes. This was altered again on 25 June 1961, when the headway varied between 10, 12 and 15 depending on the time of day.

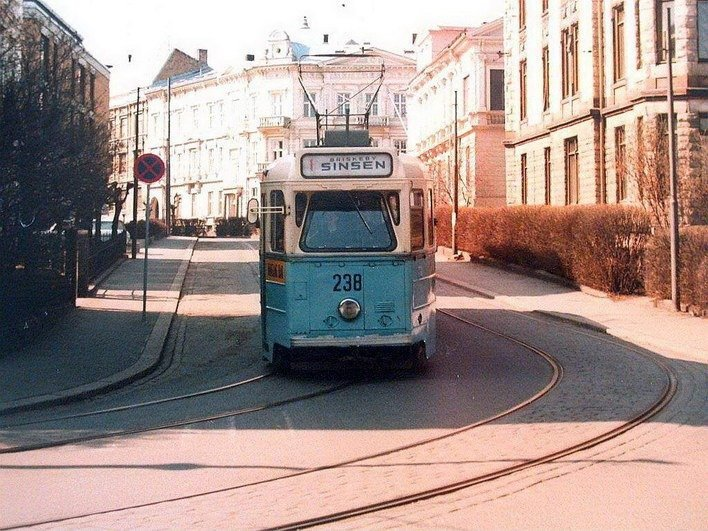
SM53 tram in Riddervolds gate turning onto Inkognitogata in 1976

All remaining older twin-axle trams were retired on 29 October 1967 and thus only used SM53, with a few Gullfisk on morning routes because of them spending the night at Majorstuen. Renovated SM53 started running on the Briskeby Line 1980 and from 18 October 1982 the conductor was removed. Articulated SL79 trams were introduced on 2 April 1984, after which they served most of the departures. From 18 April 1988 evening and Sunday routes from the Briskeby Line terminated at Stortorvet. During the 1990s the line would often be served using SM91 trams. Line 1's eastern end was moved on 2 August 1993 to the Ekeberg Line. Night trams were introduced on 5 February 1994. Line number 1 was given to the Oslo Metro on 8 April 1995 and the Briskeby Line took number 19.

In 2002 Oslo Sporveier announced plans to severely reduce the tram services in Oslo, ultimately recommending that the entire tramway be closed. They later moderated themselves and proposed closing the Kjelsås Line and the Homansbyen service. The city council granted 8 million krone on 12 April to allow the services via Homansbyen continue. The threat of closing the line sparked a local outcry and spurred demonstrations to keep the tram. Later that year Oslo Sporveier announced new plans to remove tram services, this time both the Briskeby and the Homansbyen services, along with the Sinsen Line. The issue was resolved with increased funding granted on 11 November.

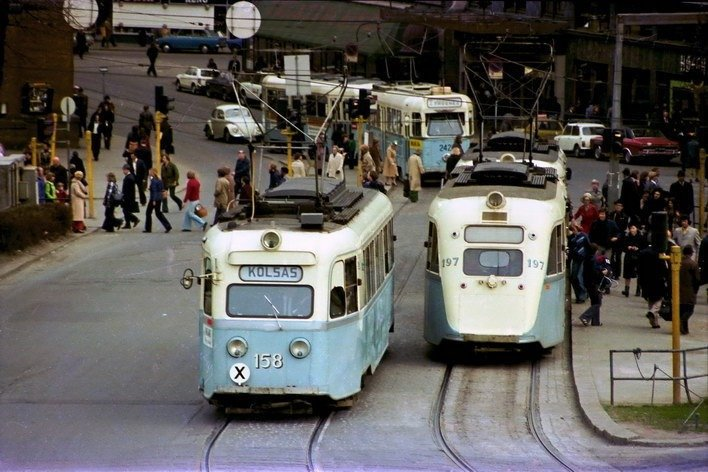
Two Gullfisk trams meeting at Nationaltheatret in 1976

From 2001 Oslo Sporveier and later Ruter removed the Briskeby Line from its long-term investment plans, cutting maintenance to a minimum. Oslo Sporveier carried out a series of improvements to the Briskeby Line between 2004 and 2006. Rosenborgs gate was moved to serve both lines 11 and 19, giving it twice the number of departures. Both lines had their headway cut from 15 to 10 minutes. The station were made more visible and parking restrictions were carried out in Inkognitogata. Meltzers gate was closed as a station. This cause decreased travel time, and saw the daily ridership rise from 1,300 to 2,250 boarding passengers from 2003 to 2007. In 2007 the line was put back on the investment list and the city granted 32 million Norwegian krone to upgrade the line. The funding was used to renew the infrastructure in Holtegata and Briskebyveien between 2007 and 2009.

== Line Upgrades ==
The Briskeby Line was majorly in poor condition due to insufficient maintenance. The transit authorities are in the process of upgrading the line, which will involve new stations, possibly located at more suitable locations. A report published by Ruter found several shortcomings in the line. In addition to its low technical standard, it often sees operations interrupted by incorrectly parked cars, especially in Riddervolds gate. The intersection of Inkognitogata and Riddervolds gate have a curve radius of 16.7 meters (55 ft), which hinders the newer SL95 trams from operating on the line. Owing to the use of Inkognitogata, the services do not pass through the important transit hub at Solli plass.

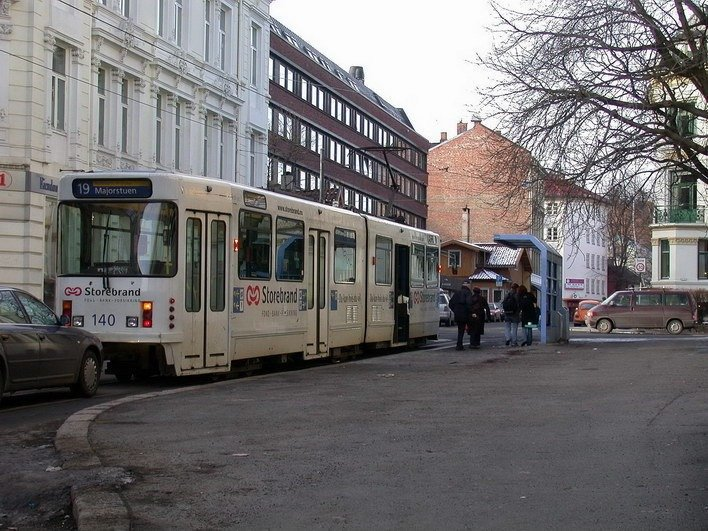
SL79 tram at Briskeby

Ruter is working on plans to make a full upgrade of the line from Briskebyveien to Henrik Ibsens gate. The agency is considering two lines of action: either building the route along the current right-of-way, or moving the section from Riddervolds gate and Inkognitoveien to Skovveien. The latter would involve that the Briskeby Line link up with the Frogner Line in Frognerveien and run concurrently with it to Solli plass.

In the city center, the one-way track in Tollbugata has been moved to Prinsens gate. This made Prinsens gate a pure tram street, while buses have been designated to Tollbugata. Construction commenced in 2014 and was completed by 2017. The Gamlebyen Line was moved to Dronning Eufemias gate through Bjørvika, which aligned it to Prinsens gate. Ruter is planning on placing tram tracks in Frederiks gate, which will trams to pass between the Ullevål Hageby Line to the Briskeby Line and thus serve Nationaltheatret. It will also allow trams access to Stortorvet and Jernbanetorget via the Ullevål Hageby Line's in case of disruptions.

Construction is planned to start springtime 2025, with project completion and commissioning of the upgraded route late 2026/early 2027.

== Bibliography ==
- Aspenberg, Nils Carl (1994). Trikker og forstadsbaner i Oslo (in Norwegian). Oslo: Baneforlaget. ISBN 82-91448-03-5.
- Fasting, Kåre (1975). Sporveier i Oslo gjennom 100 år: 1875–1975 (in Norwegian). Oslo: Grøhdal & Søn. ISBN 82-504-0116-6.
- Fristad, Hans Andreas (1990). Oslo-trikken – storbysjel på skinner (in Norwegian). Oslo: Gyldendal. ISBN 82-05-19084-4.
- Ruter (2009). "Briskebytrikken – Vurdering av trasévalg for nedre del av Briskebytrikken" (PDF) (in Norwegian).
- Ruter (2010). "Trikkestrategi" (PDF) (in Norwegian). Archived from the original (PDF) on 25 May 2014.
