= Homansbyen tram stop =

Tram stop in Oslo, Norway

Homansbyen

General information
- Location: Homansbyen, Frogner, Oslo; Norway
- Coordinates: 59°55′22″N 10°43′35″E
- Lines: Briskeby Line; Ullevål Hageby Line

History
- Opened: 10 October 1875

Services
Preceding station	Trams in Oslo	Following station
Bogstadveien towards Majorstuen	Line 19	Holbergs plass towards Ljabru
Location

Homansbyen is a tram stop located at Homansbyen in Frogner borough of Oslo, Norway. It is on the Homansbyen Line, a short line that connects the Briskeby Line and Ullevål Hageby Line of Oslo Tramway, and is served by line 19 using SL79 trams. This line is the shortest of the three tram lines that connect the city centre with Majorstuen. The city has planned to build a new rapid transit station for the Oslo T-bane at Homansbyen, but as of 2017 this has not been developed.

== Tram station ==
Homansbyen was opened on 10 October 1875, as the terminus of the first horsecar line built by Kristiania Sporveisselskab. The station became a branch of the main Ullevål Hageby Line when a connection was built between it and the Kristiania Elektriske Sporvei-owned Briskeby Line on 1 May 1912.

In 2002, Oslo Sporveier decided to close Homansbyen Line from 12 April 2003 due to financial difficulties, and reroute the 11-tram to the Ullevåll Hageby Line instead. However, a city grant on 8 April 2003 allowed the service to be retained. A short 11B-line was implemented to run Stortorvet-Homansbyen-Majorstuen until the 11 was returned to the Homansbyen Line in June 2003. As of 2021, the Homansbyen line is served by line 19 (Majorstuen-Homansbyen-Ljabru).

== Rapid transit station ==
As part of the Oslo Package 3 investment program, the Municipality of Oslo has prosed to build a new station of the Common Tunnel of the Oslo T-bane. After the closing of the station Valkyrie plass in 1985, there are 2.0 kilometres (1.2 mi) between the stations Majorstuen and Nationaltheatret. Homansbyen would be located about midway between these two stations, serving residential areas in Frogner. Unlike the other stations between Jernbanetorget and Majorstuen of the T-bane, the station would not function as a transport hub or service many working places. The station is estimated to have 10,000 daily travelers. Construction is estimated to start in 2014, and be completed by 2017.

Oslo Sporveier, the then owner and operator of the T-bane, announced in 2006 that they were opposed to the station being built, even though 700 million kr has been put aside in Oslo Package 3. The company stated that the area had a good tram service, and was in no need of rapid transit. Because the station would be far underground, travel time gains to the city center for local residents would be small, compared to using the tram. Also, all travelers taking the T-bane west of the city center would get a longer travel time, since all trains would have to stop at Homansbyen. Oslo Sporveier was also concerned that a rapid transit station would take ridership away from the trams, that previously had been threatened with closure. The section of the Common Tunnel is the oldest on the T-bane, having been opened in 1928. The T-bane needs NOK 100 million to upgrade the safety in the tunnel; the current plans involve there being no stops between the two stations. Due to the narrow tunnel profile, evacuation from the trains must be done from the ends of the trains.
