= Solli tram stop =

Tram stop in Oslo, Norway

Solli
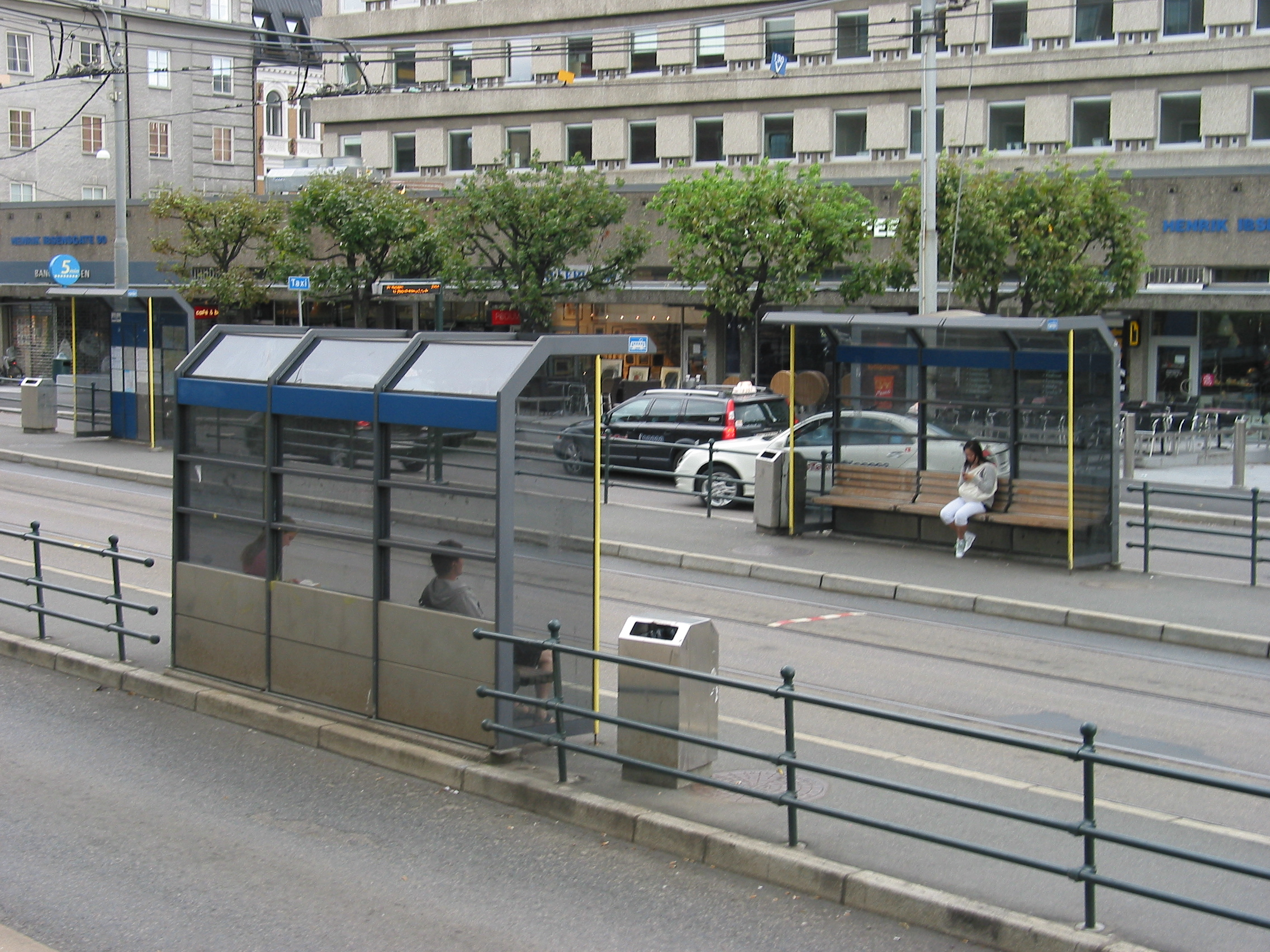

General information
- Location: Solli plass, Oslo; Norway
- Coordinates: 59.914857°N 10.719057°E
- Lines: Frogner Line, Vika Line Skøyen Line

History
- Opened: 2 March 1894
Location

Solli is a light rail/tram stop on the Oslo Tramway.

Located at Solli plass, it was opened by Kristiania Elektriske Sporvei on 2 March 1894 as a part of the first stretch of what would become the Skøyen Line and the Frogner Line. It is served by line 13 and 12. It is a short walk to Inkognitogata (Platforms E and F) served by Line 11 and Lapsetorvet (Platforms C and D) served by bus line 21 (Helsfyr - Tjuvholmen). Solli is also served by bus lines 30 (Bygdøy - Nydalen) and 31 (Snarøya - Fornebu - Tonsenhagen - Grorud T)

The National Library of Norway is located nearby, as are the headquarters of the Federation of Norwegian Commercial and Service Enterprises.

== See also ==
Trams in Oslo
Skøyen Line
Vika Line
Frogner Line

Preceding station	Trams in Oslo	Following station
Niels Juels gate towards Majorstuen	Line 12	Ruseløkka towards Kjelsås
Skillebekk towards Bekkestua	Line 13	Nationaltheatret towards Ljabru
