= Nationaltheatret metro station =

Oslo metro station

Nationaltheatret
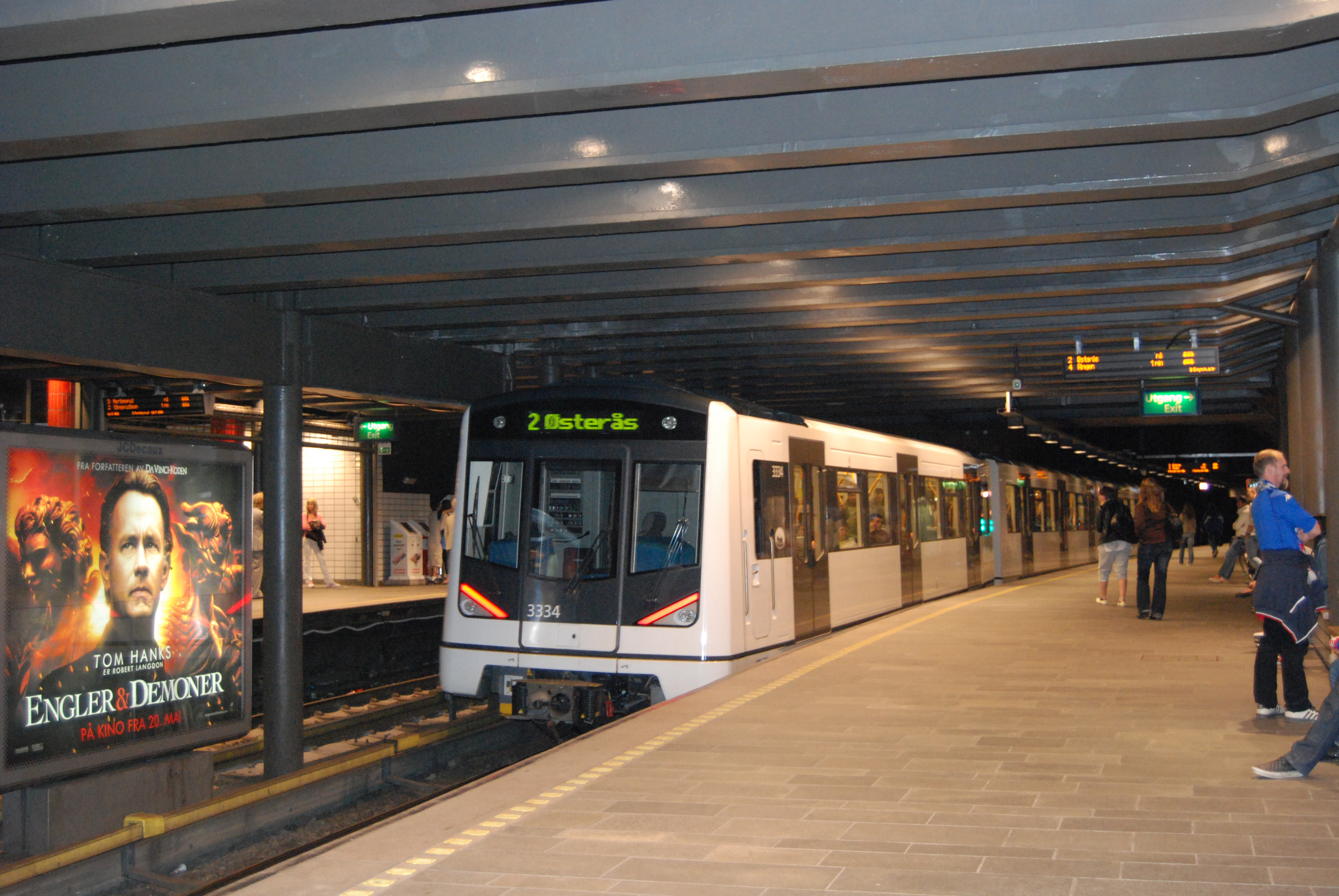

General information
- Location: Vika, Oslo; Norway
- Coordinates: 59°54′53″N 10°43′59″E
- Elevation: 5.4 m (18 ft)
- Owner: Sporveien
- Operator: Sporveien T-banen
- Line: Common Tunnel
- Distance: 0.7 km (0.43 mi) from Stortinget
- Connections: : Nationaltheatret station; : Ruter

Construction
- Structure type: Underground
- Accessible: Yes

History
- Opened: 28 June 1928; 98 years ago

Services
Preceding station	Oslo Metro	Following station
Majorstuen towards Frognerseteren	Line 1	Stortinget towards Bergkrystallen
Majorstuen towards Østerås	Line 2	Stortinget towards Ellingsrudåsen
Majorstuen towards Kolsås	Line 3	Stortinget towards Mortensrud
Majorstuen towards Vestli	Line 4	Stortinget towards Bergkrystallen
Majorstuen towards Sognsvann	Line 5	Stortinget towards Vestli
Preceding station	Trams in Oslo	Following station
Inkognitogata towards Majorstuen	Line 11	Øvre Slottsgate towards Kjelsås
Solli towards Bekkestua	Line 13	Øvre Slottsgate towards Ljabru
Location

Nationaltheatret is an underground metro station and tram stop serving Vika and the city center of Oslo, Norway. It is located on the Common Tunnel of the Oslo Metro and on the Briskeby Line of the Oslo Tramway. Also located at the same place is Nationaltheatret station of the Drammen Line. The station is served by all five lines of the metro, and lines 11 and 13 of the tramway. In addition, several bus services call at the station. It is named for the National Theatre located nearby.

The tram stop in the area opened in 1894. Nationaltheatret was the first underground station in the Nordic countries; construction of a 1.6-kilometre (1.0 mi) tunnel from Majorstuen to the city center started in 1912, but was not finished until 1928. Until the 1987 opening of Stortinget, Nationaltheatret was the city terminus for the four western light rail lines: the Holmenkollen Line, the Røa Line, the Sognsvann Line (from 1934) and the Kjelsås Line (from 1942). The mainline railway station opened in 1980, and in 1993, the light rail station was upgraded to allow metro trains to run through it.

== Facilities ==
Nationaltheatret is Norway's first underground mainline railway station, located within the Oslo Tunnel on the Drammen Line. At ground level, there are three entrances to the station: on the west side of the station, the main entrance is from beneath 7. juni-plassen and Victoria Terrasse, facing Ruseløkkveien; there is an entrance from Johanne Dybwads plass, which is the site of the National Theatre. From the east, there is an entrance from Henrik Ibsens gate. There is a large, open vestibule near the surface at the entrance to Ruseløkkveien. It has high-mounted windows facing south, giving natural lighting. The area features escalators and elevators to the platforms, staffed ticket sales, lockers, kiosks and cafés. The station is also equipped with ticket machines and features baggage trolleys, washrooms, automated teller machines and a Western Union bank. Parking is available 300 meters (1,000 ft) away at Vika, where car rental is also provided. Bicycle parking and taxi stands are located at street level.

== Service ==
All five lines of the Oslo Metro, numbered 1 through 5, run through Nationaltheatret. Each service has a 15-minute headway, which is reduced to every 30 minutes in the late evening and early on Sundays. Thus the station is served by up to 24 trains per hour per direction. Lines 11 and 13 of the Oslo Tramway run along the line, with line 11 serving the Briskeby Line, the Grünerløkka–Torshov Line, and the Kjelsås Line and line 13 serving the Skøyen Line, the Lilleaker Line and the Ekeberg Line. It is served by Ruter bus lines, 30 Nydalen-Bygdøy, 31 (Grorud T)-Tonsenhagen—Fornebu-(Snarøya), 32 Kværnerbyen-Voksen skog, 33 Ellingsrudåsen T-Filipstad, and more.

The railway station located below the metro station serves trains operating west of Oslo Central Station. All eight lines of the Oslo Commuter Rail stop at Nationaltheatret. However, not all services of all line operate west of Oslo S. The Airport Express Train operates direct, high-speed services to Oslo Airport, Gardermoen every 20 minutes, with the journey taking 28 minutes. The intercity services along the Bergen Line (F4) and the Sørlandet Line (F5) call at Nationaltheatret, as does the regional service along the Vestfold Line (RE11). Eastwards, these continue past Oslo S and serve the southern part of the Dovre Line until Lillehammer (RE10).

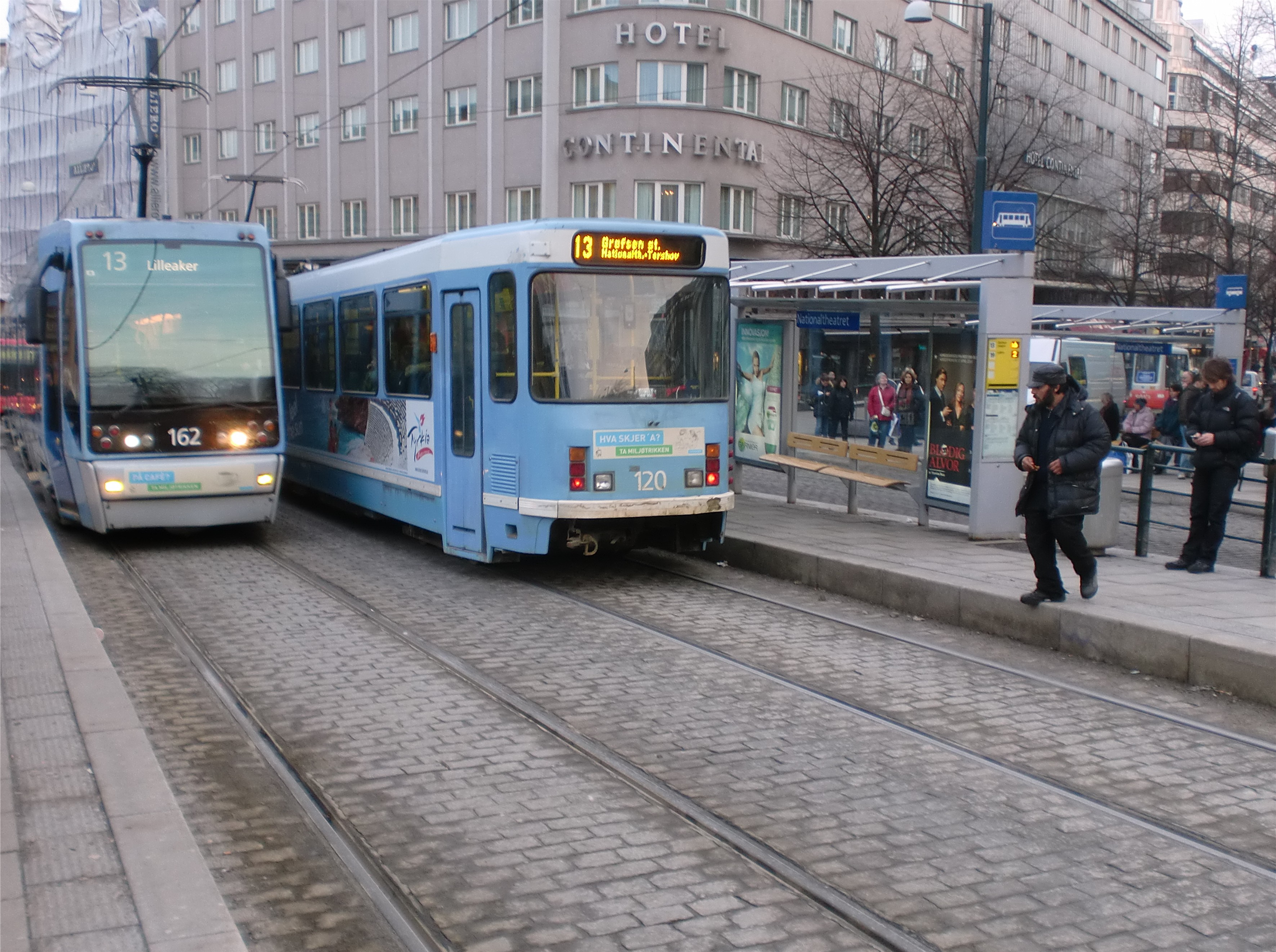
The tram stop at ground level, with SL95 (left) and SL79 (right) trams

== History ==
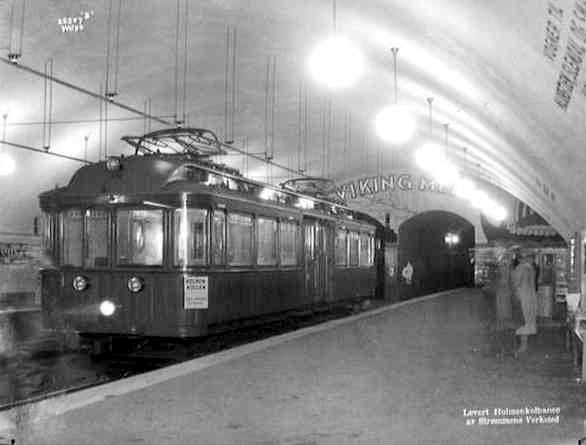
Tram at Nationaltheatret in 1928

The tramway past Nationaltheatret was opened on 2 March 1894, when Kristiania Elektriske Sporvei opened the Briskeby ine from Oslo East Station via Briskeby to Majorstuen. In 1898, the Holmenkollen Line was opened, a light rail running from Majorstuen to Holmenkollen. The terminus at Majorstuen was a major hassle for passengers; most people were bound for the city center, and these had to change to the street trams at Majorstuen. For Holmenkolbanen, there were two ways to solve the issue. Either sign trafficking rights with Kristiania Elektriske Sporvei to use their tracks on the Briskeby Line to reach the city center. Alternatively, a tunnel could be built to an underground station in the city center. Applications for a tunnel were sent to the municipality in 1901. However, disagreements as to whether the tunnel was to be considered a railway or tramway halted progress. The city considered the line a tramway while the company considered the tunnel a railway.

A new application was sent in 1907. It was proposed as a single track line which would run to the intersection of Karl Johans gate and Fredriks gate, and estimated to cost 1.5 million Norwegian krone (NOK). The plans were opposed by some in the city, who stated that the line would take passengers from the street trams, and stimulate migration to the areas along the Holmenkollen Line in Aker, and thus reduce the tax income for the city. In 1909, the municipal council stated that they were opposed to the tunnel. On 9 June 1911, the city council voted that they would accept the tunnel if the terminus was moved to the intersection of Karl Johans gate and Ruseløkkveien, but this was rejected by the company. Aker Municipal Council voted on 27 May 1909 that they were in favor of the tunnel, and on 9 June 1911 the proposal was passed by the Parliament of Norway. Both municipalities wanted the redemption right, but this given to the state. Holmenkolbanen received a concession for 60 years from the date of opening.

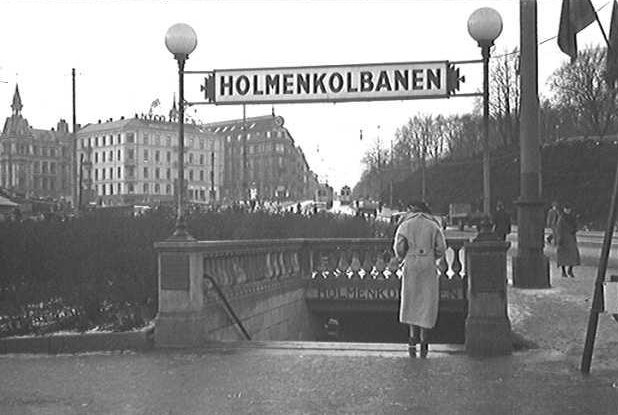
Entrance to Nationaltheatret in 1935

Construction started in 1912 in the central part of the tunnel. At the time, an agreement had not been reach with the municipality about the location of the terminus. By October 1914, the tunnel works had been completed from Rosenborggaten to the statue of Karl Johan in Slottsparken. The issue of the terminus was still not completed, and work was therefore halted. Holmenkolbanen were planning on building the line through the city center, and therefore wanted the terminus at Fredriks gate, while the municipality wanted it at Ruseløkkveien.

In 1915, a competition for a plan for the city's tramway light rails was launched, although it took two years for the invitation to be issued. In July 1918, the winner was announced, and in September 1919 a committee made a suggestion for how to expand the light rail network. It proposed connecting the Lilleaker Line to Majorstuen, a tunnel through the city center from Majorstuen to Stortorvet and Vaterland, and onwards as an elevated line eastwards, along routes that closely resemble the current metro lines and the Ekeberg Line. From Stortorvet, there was proposed a northern branch which would be built northwards towards Kjelsås. In addition, a route close to the current Ring Line was proposed.

Following a competition for the design of a new light rail network in the city, which was concluded in 1919, the municipality to again consider the terminus of the tunnel. The executive committee supported terminating the tunnel at Eidsvolls plass, but this was rejected by the city council on 13 July 1920. Holmenkolbanen convinced the municipality to establish a committee to look into the specific issue. In September 1921, the committee proposed creating a temporary terminus, following Holmenkolbanen's route, in the square behind the National Theatre. This was under the condition that experts concluded that construction would be done without damage to surrounding buildings. The proposal was passed by the city council on 13 October 1921. In June 1922, an expert committee concluded that construction would be satisfactory.

In June 1923, the executive committee voted to allow a temporary terminus at Nationaltheatret, while Holmenkolbanen were obliged to continue the line onwards to Studenterlunden. The company did not accept the new terms, and the city council could finally pass a proposal the company would accept on 3 April 1924. However, by then traffic had increased on the Holmenkollen Line, and the Røa Line had been connected to Majorstuen, while the Sognsvann Line was under planning. This made Holmenkolbanen change the tunnel to double track. To finance the construction, the company borrowed NOK 11.5 million. Concession was granted on 15 January 1926, which demanded that the tunnel open by the end of 1928. Past Slottsparken the original track had been built with increased depth to allow a potential extension of the Drammen Line of the Norwegian State Railways to run above the light rail tunnel. By 1926, these plans had been discarded, and the second track was not made as deep.

The station officially opened on 27 June 1928 by King Haakon VII. It became the first underground railway in the Nordic countries, five years before Stockholm and six years before Copenhagen. The tunnel was 1,620 meters (5,310 ft) long and trams used three to four minutes to run the length. The station would be used by two companies: Holmenkolbanen and Akersbanerne. Holmenkolbanen operated both the Røa Line and the Holmenkollen Line, but from the Sognsvann Line was connected to the tunnel from 10 October 1934, a financing solution needed to be made.

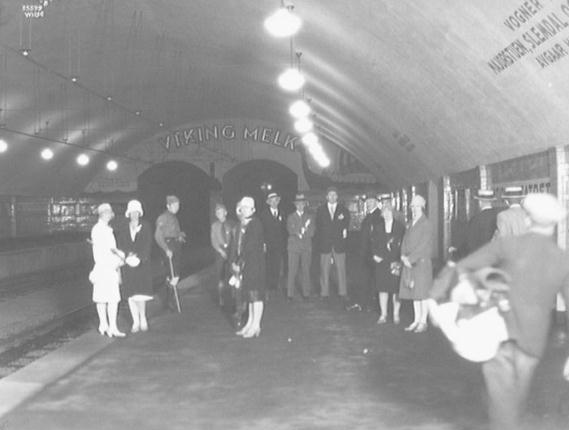
People waiting at Nationaltheatret in 1928

In 1931, Aker Municipality purchasing the majority of Holmenkolbanen, and merging the Røa Line and Sognsvann Line into the company. In 1939, Bærumsbanen started the construction of a branch from the Lilleaker Line to Majorstuen. From 15 June 1942, the Kolsås Line, as it was renamed, started running via the tunnel to Nationaltheatret. Bærumsbanen became part of Oslo Sporveier in 1971.

By the 1930s, Oslo had two main railway stations, Oslo East Station and Oslo West Station. Serving as the terminal station of the Drammen Line, Oslo West Station (Oslo V) was located in Vika. The much larger Oslo East Station (Oslo Ø) served most commuter, regional and intercity trains. In 1938, the Station Committee of 1938 was established to look into a possible connection of the Drammen Line to Oslo Ø. Led by Axel Grenholm, the committee recommended building a branch from the Drammen Line as a tunnel under the city center, allowing all trains would terminate at Oslo Ø. The proposal was presented to the Parliament of Norway on 4 November 1961, along with several other matters related to rail transport investments. Construction of the Oslo Tunnel, Oslo Central Station and Nationaltheatret was passed unanimously.

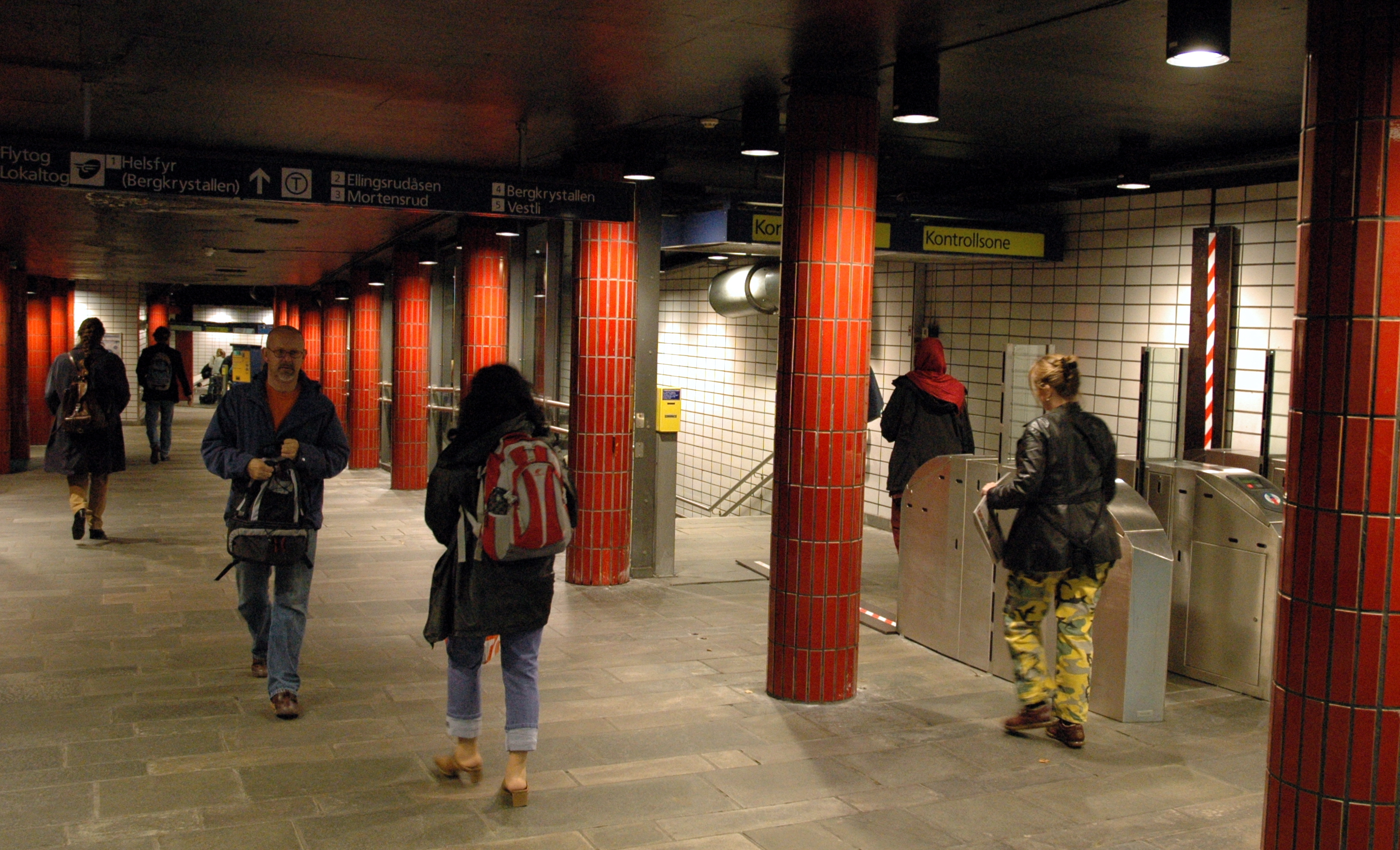
Entrance to the eastbound platform

During the 1960s, the Oslo Tunnel was being planned to connect the Drammen Line to Oslo East Station. This would make Oslo West Station unnecessary, and would allow a central station to be built at the location of the East Station. The tunnel was planned to run in a similar route as would be necessary to connect Jernbanetorget to Nationaltheatret, and a railway station was planned to connect to Nationaltheatret. Simultaneously, Oslo Sporveier worked with possibilities to connect their eastern and western networks, and get both into the city core. During the 1960s, the planning office for the metro proposed to build a connecting tunnel between Nationaltheatret and Jernbanetorget. However, the initial plans involved creating a station close to Nationaltheatret, named for Slottsparken, which would serve as the transfer point between the two systems. This station had a planned dimension to hold 25,000 people.

At the time, the western and eastern networks were incompatible; in addition to different platform heights, the eastern network used six-car trains with a third-rail power supply, while the western network used overhead wires and two-car trains. The initial plans were met with criticism, following media's discovery that the main planners had not consulted several hired specialists, and that alternatives to the preferred route had not been made. As a consequence, several engineers working for the Norwegian State Railways made two alternative suggestion for the route. By 1975, the plans were changed so Nationaltheatret would become the transfer station, by building a balloon loop for the eastern trains, while the western trains would terminate as before. This solution would allow the two networks to be connected later.

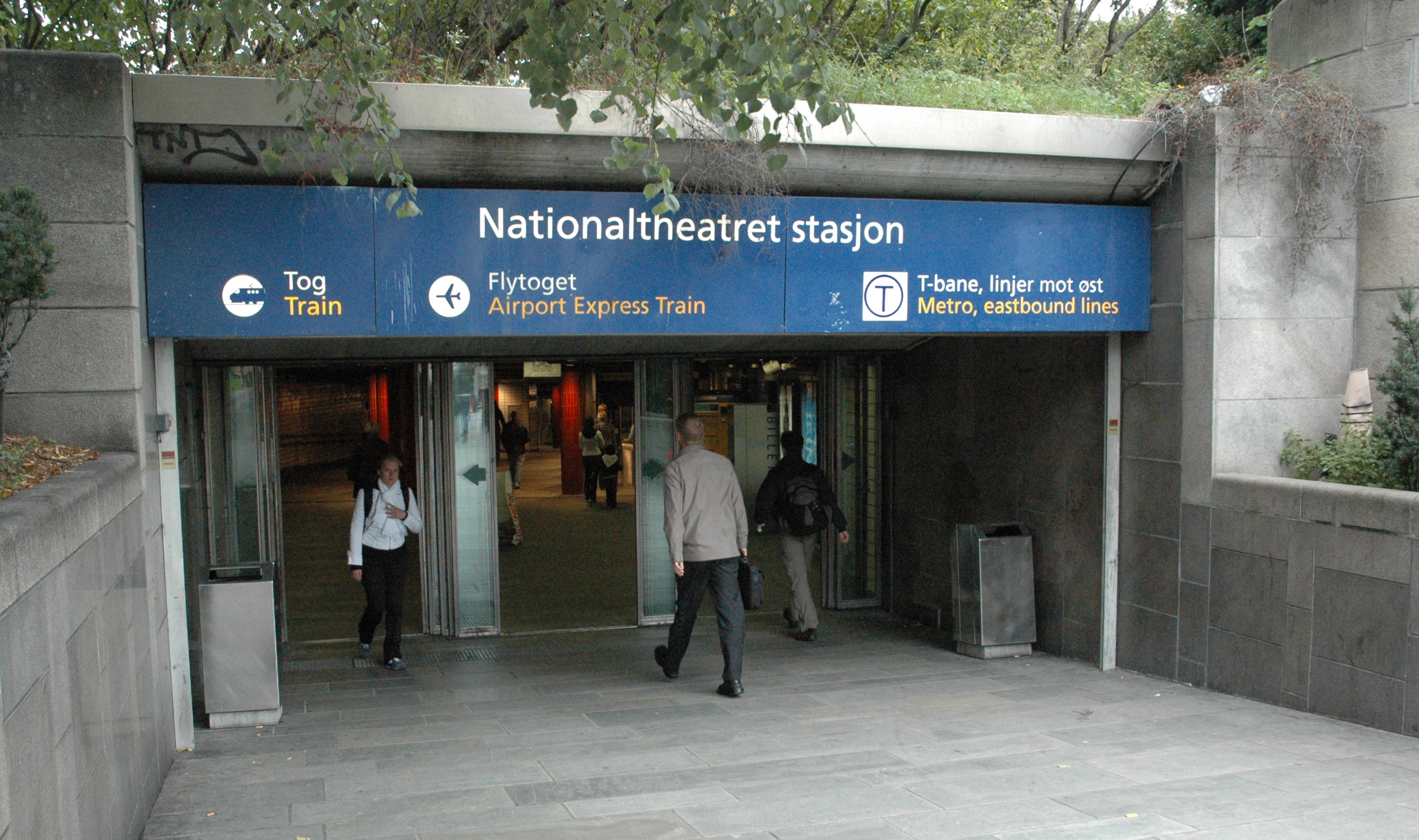
Entrance

The decision to build Sentrum, located 700 metres (2,300 ft) west of Jernbanetorget, was taken by the city council on 22 May 1969; the decision also involved that the transfer station be placed at Slottsparken/Nationaltheatret. Construction started in 1972, and the first leaks were revealed. By the time the station opened on 9 January 1977, the leaks had not been removed. In 1978, the city planner discarded the proposal from Oslo Sporveier to build a new station at Slottsparken, and instead decided that Stortinget would become the interchange between the two systems. This would allow the western network to later be upgraded to metro standard and allow through trains. The proposal was supported by all political parties except the Labour Party.

The railway station and the Oslo Tunnel was taken into use on 1 June. On 20 February 1983, Sentrum was closed to finally remove all leaks. The station reopened on 7 March 1987, with the new name Stortinget. The Common Tunnel was completed, and the trains from the western network terminated where at the old platforms, where the eastern trains had previously terminated. The eastern trains instead operated through a balloon loop. On 27 May 1989, Oslo V was closed and all traffic started running via Nationaltheatret.

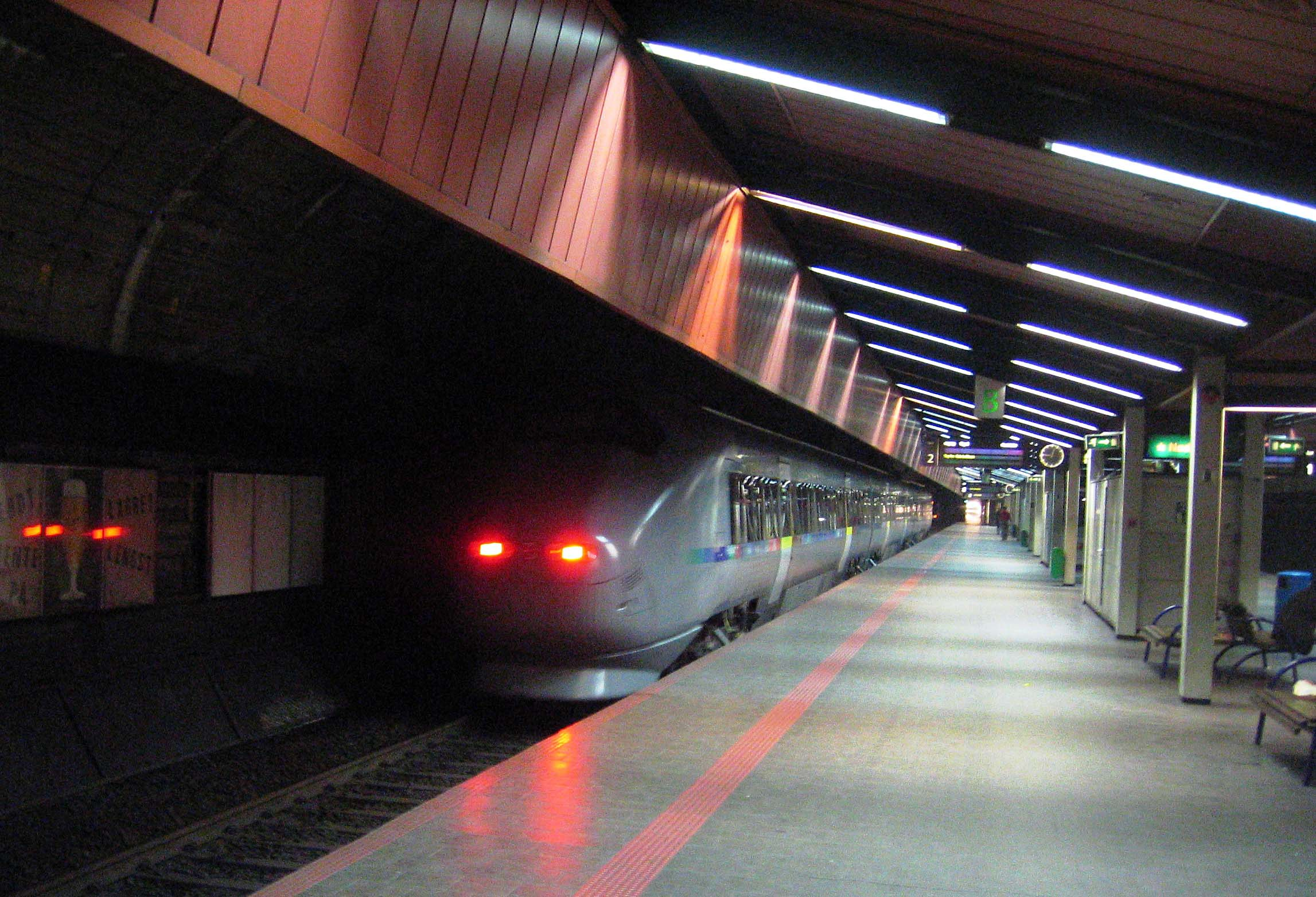
An Airport Express Train at the railway station

On 7 October 1987, the city decided to connect the four light rails west of the city center with the Oslo Metro. The Sognsvann Line was selected as the first line to be upgraded, so the two systems would become compatible. The line, including the Common Tunnel and Nationaltheatret, were upgraded to metro standard by replacing the overhead wire with a third-rail power supply and installing automatic train protection. The platforms were lengthened from fitting two-car to fitting six-car trains, and the platform height increased. From 4 April, the line started operating through the Common Tunnel and connected to the Lambertseter Line.

From 1998, the Airport Express Train would start operating, and more capacity would be needed, both at Nationaltheatret and through the Oslo Tunnel. In 1995, NSB held an architecture competition to expand the station complex, which was won by LPO Arkitektur og Design and their design "Next To Nothing". Most of the work involved the railway station, which received four platforms, escalators and art. However, it also involved a larger vestibule and easier access between the two stations. The upgrades cost NOK 920 million and was officially opened by King Harald V on 16 December 1999.

== Transport Hub ==
Nationaltheatret is also a Transport hub served by these tram and bus lines:

Tram:

- Majorstuen - Kjelsås
- Bekkestua - Lilleaker - Ljabru

Bus:

- 12N Majorstuen - Kjelsås (Night Bus)
- 30 Bygdøy - Nydalen
- 30N Bygdøy - Jernbanetorget (Night Bus)
- 31 Snarøya - Fornebu - Tonsenhagen - Grorud T (24H)
- 32 Voksen Skog - Kvænerbyen
- 32N Voksen Skog - Kvænerbyen (Night Bus)
- 33 Filipstad - Ellingsrudåsen (Rush hour Bus)
- 54 Tjuvholmen - Kjelsås stasjon
- 70 Skullerud via Ryen and Abildsø
- 81 (Fornebu -)Filipstad (Hjortnes) - Myrvoll stasjon
- 81N Ski stasjon via Hauketo and Greverud (Night Bus)
- 83N Fløysbonn via Kolbotn (Night Bus)
- 130N Oslo Bussterminal - Sandvika (Night Bus)
- 140N Oslo Bussterminal - Bekketua (Night Bus)
- 150 Oslo Bussterminal - Gullhaug
- 150E Gullhaug - (Bykrsset) via Lysaker and Bærums verk (Rush hour Bus)
- 160 Oslo Bussterminal - Rykkinn
- 160E Rykkinn via Lysaker and Kolsås (Rush hour Bus)
- 250 Oslo Bussterminal - Slemmestad - Sætre
- 250N Oslo Bussterminal - Slemmestad - Sætre (Night Bus)
- 250E Oslo Bussterminal - Slemmestad (Rush hour Bus)
- 255E Oslo Bussterminal - Sætre (Rush hour Bus)
- 265E Nesøya via Lysaker (Rush hour Bus)
