= Sommerroparken =

Park in Oslo, Norway

Coordinates: 59°54′54″N 10°43′7″E

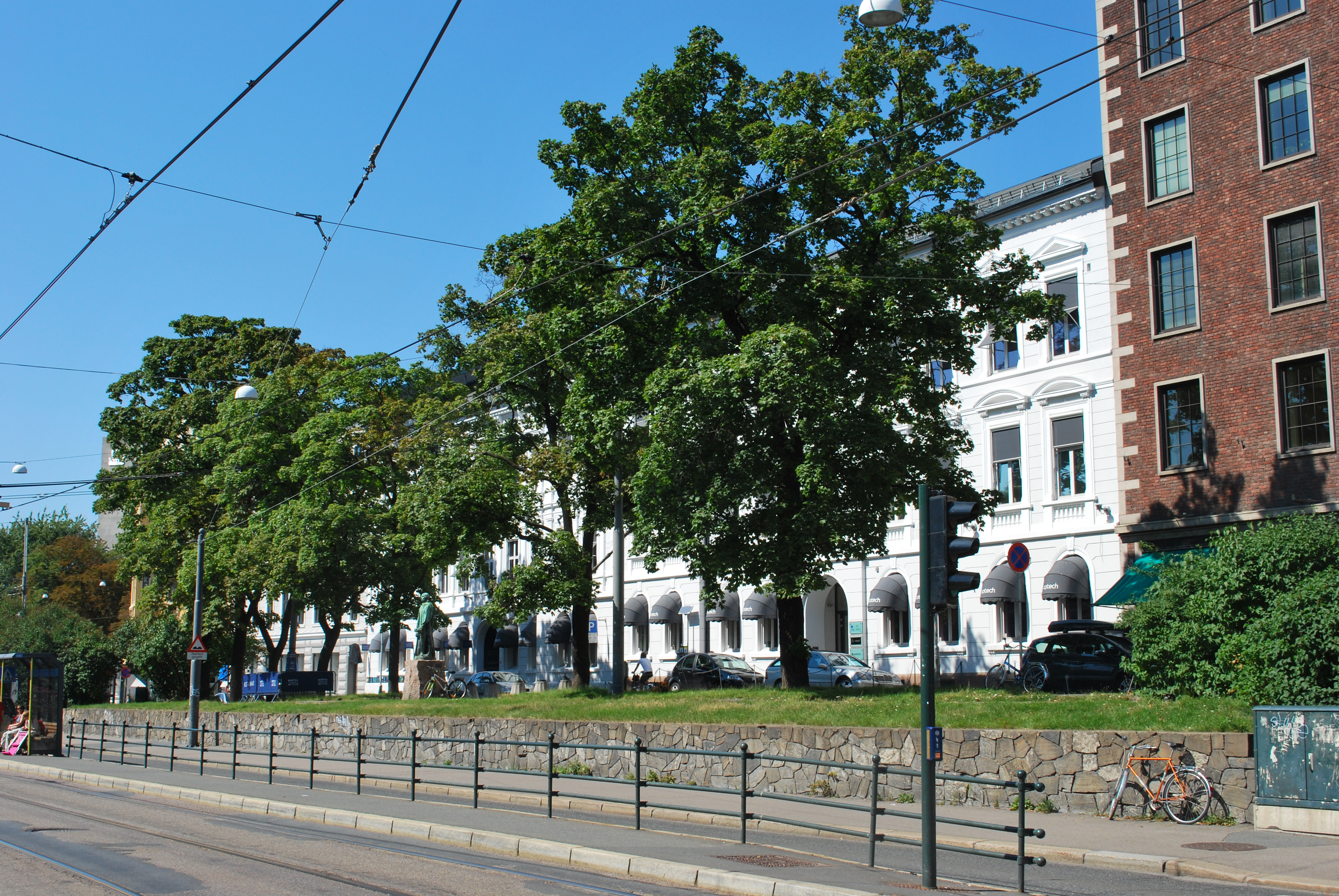
Sommerroparken, Oslo

Sommerroparken (Sommerro Park), formerly known as Solliparken, is a small park between the streets of Sommerrogata and Henrik Ibsens Gate in the Frogner district of Oslo, Norway. It consists of a narrow grass-covered strip with park benches, ornaments, trees and bushes.

== Location and history ==
The park, with a maximum width of 8 m (26 ft), stretches some 200 m (670 ft) between Henrik Ibsens Gate, which leads to the square of Solli plass, and Sommerrogata, a small street on its north side flanked by buildings. The roundabout at its western end provides access to Frognerveien, Drammensveien and Bygdøy Allé. The name of Sommerro stems from the large estate which belonged to the 18th century merchant Bernt Anker. The park was developed by the Society for the Welfare of Oslo between 1850 and 1874 when various trees and shrubs were planted. By 1886, the park covered an area of 2,146 m^{2} (23,100 sq ft).

The sculpture Mannen med nøkkelen (The Man with the Key) by the French sculptor Auguste Rodin was unveiled in the park in 1902. It depicts Jean d'Aire, one of the figures from the work The Burghers of Calais.

The length of the park was considerably reduced in at the end of the 1930s with the development of Lapsetorvet and Solli Plass. In 2009, the municipality undertook renovation work with paving stones and new benches.
