= Hegdehaugen =

Neighborhood in Oslo, Norway

Coordinates: 59°55′29″N 10°43′28″E

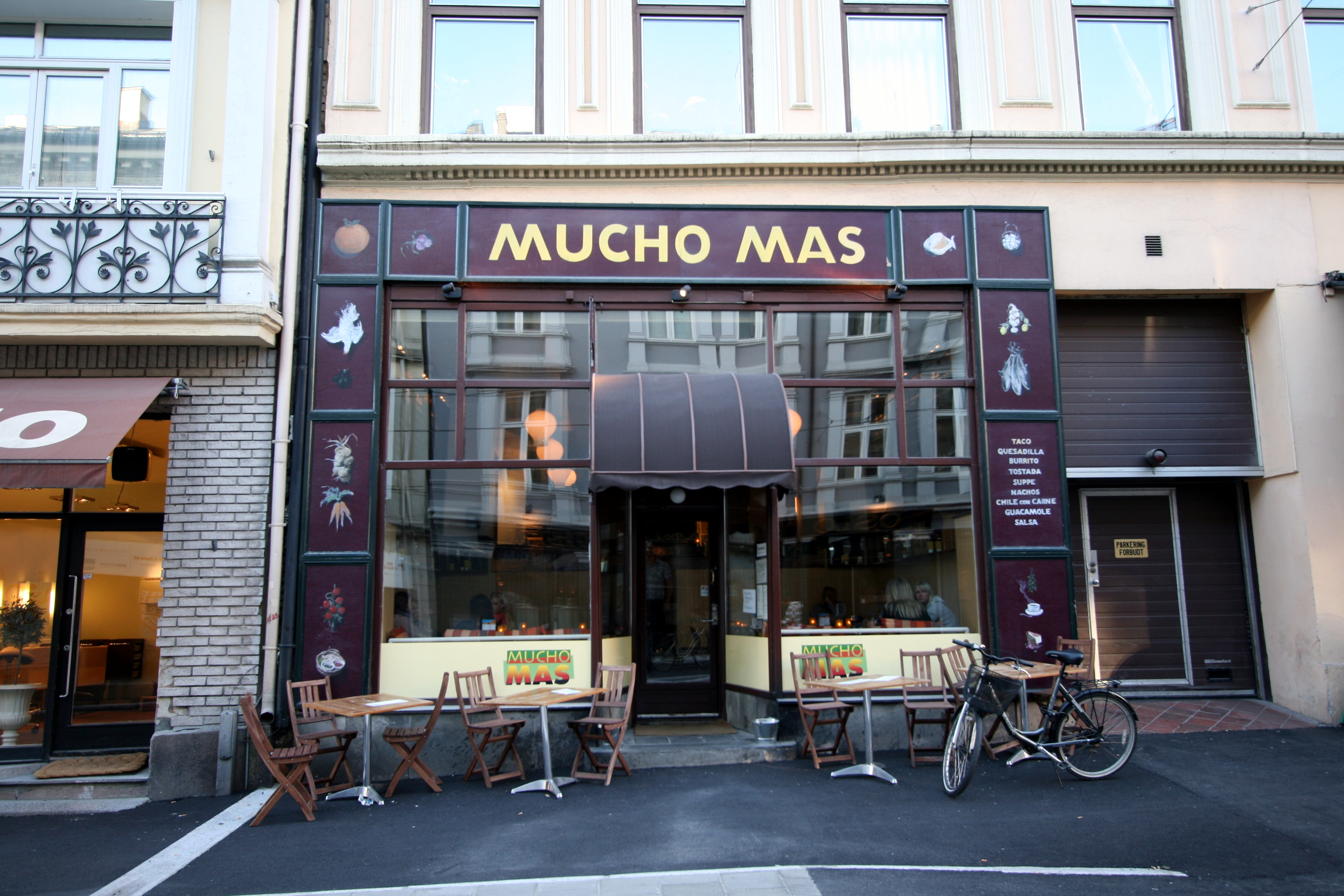
Mucho Mas, a local restaurant

Hegdehaugen is a neighbourhood in the borough Frogner of Oslo, Norway. It is located in the West End between Homansbyen and Majorstuen. The name origins from the man's name Heide.

Urban settlement in the area started in the 1860s, and the neighbourhood was incorporated in the city in 1878.

== Transport ==
Hegdehaugen is served by the stations Rosenborg and Uranienborgveien on the Briskeby Line of the Oslo Tramway, as well as Bislett on the Ullevål Hageby Line.

== Citations ==
Notes

References

- Tvedt, Knut Are, ed. (2009). "Hegdehaugen". Store norske leksikon (in Norwegian). Oslo: Kunnskapsforlaget.
- "Holdeplassene Uranienborg og Rosenborg". Oslo Sporvognsdrift (in Norwegian). June 5, 2009. Archived from the original on July 18, 2012.
