= Briskebyen, Oppland =

Neighborhood in Gjøvik, Norway

Briskebyen
- Neighborhood
- Interactive map of Briskebyen
- Coordinates: 60°47′34″N 10°41′11″E
- Country: Norway
- County: Innlandet
- Municipality: Gjøvik Municipality
- Town: Gjøvik
- Time zone: UTC+01:00 (CET)

Briskebyen is a neighborhood in central Gjøvik, Norway. The high-rise flats on Heimdalsgate that are part of the Briskebyen housing association were built in 1972.

Briskebyen was a working-class district, made up of wooden houses built in the area before 1865. Most of these houses were destroyed between 1960 and 1970. They were replaced by high-rise flats and the hospital at Haugtun.

The area is named after Briskeby in Oslo, which was also a working-class district.
