= Bogstadveien tram stop =

Tram station in Oslo, Norway

Coordinates: 59°55′34″N 10°43′18″E

Bogstadveien
- Bogstadveien Tram Stop in August 2022

General information
- Location: Frogner, Oslo; Norway
- System: Tram or Light Rail Station
- Lines: Briskeby & Homansbyen

History
- Opened: May 2014

Services
Preceding station	Trams in Oslo	Following station
Majorstuen Terminus	Line 11	Rosenborg towards Kjelsås
Majorstuen Terminus	Line 19	Homansbyen towards Ljabru
Location

Bogstadveien is a tram stop on the Homansbyen Line and the Briskeby Line. It is served by lines 11 and 19. The Homansbyen Line served by Line 19 and the Briskeby Line served by line 11, branch off here. The next station westbound is the terminus, Majorstuen. There are two different tram stops eastbound. For passengers on Line 11, the next stop is Rosenborg. For passengers on Line 19, the next stop is Homansbyen.

== History ==
Trams have been serving the street of Bogstadveien since 1894, when Kristiania Elektriske Sporvei opened the Briskeby Line from Majorstuen to Ostbanen. It replaced the former stations of Rosenborg and Schultz' gate. The station was established in 2014, and a shelter was built on the eastbound platform, between 2016 and 2017.

== Services ==
The tram routes 11 and 19 serve the station. The stop is also served by Night buses 1N (Ullerntoppen - Jernbanetorget), 2N (Østerås - Jernbanetorget - Helsfyr - Furuset - Ellingsrudåsen - (Lørenskog sentrum)) and 11N (Majorstuen - Jernbanetorget - Kjelsås).
