= Briskeby, Oslo =

Area in Oslo, Norway

Coordinates: 59°55′18.1″N 10°42′58.08″E

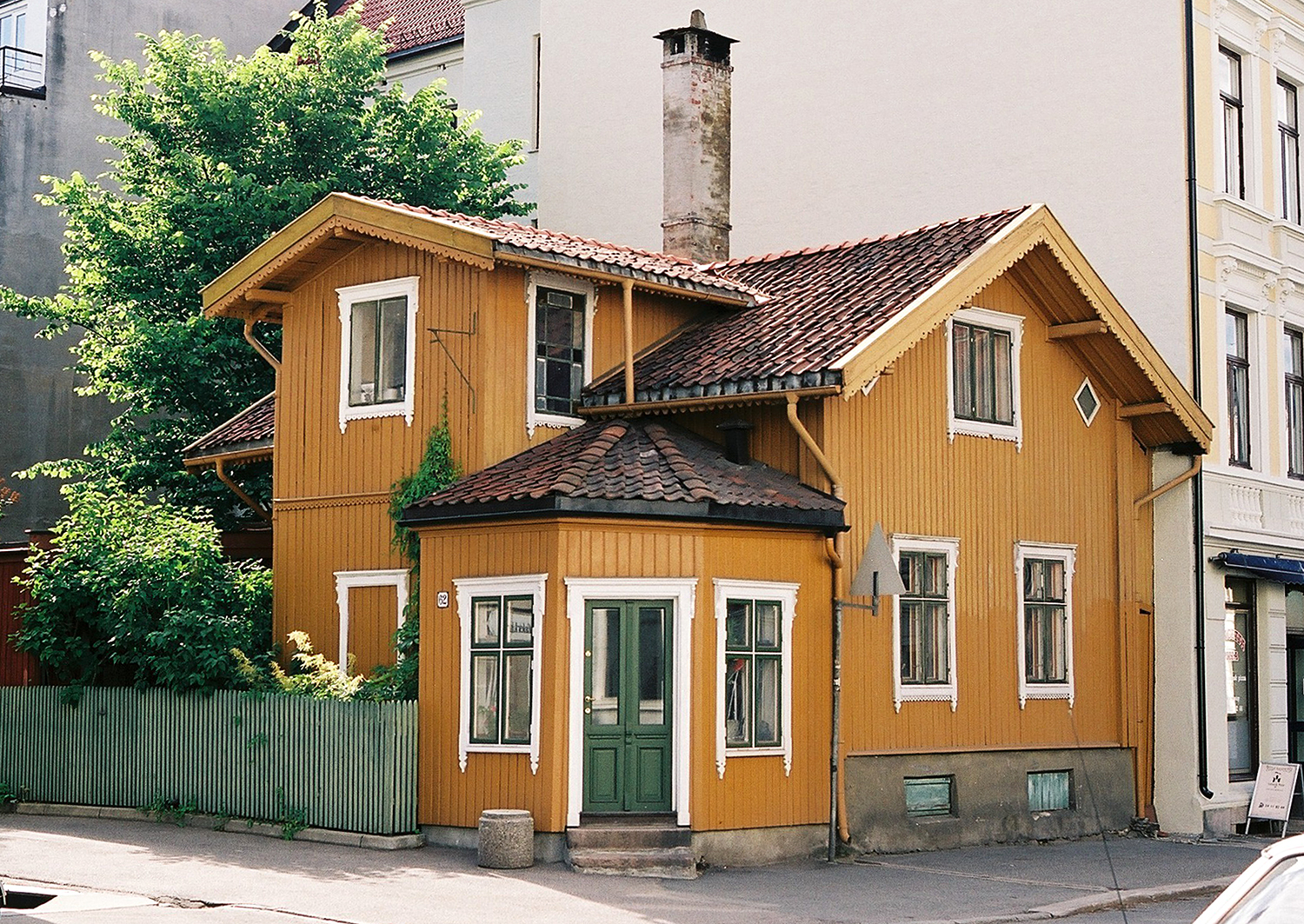
Housing in Briskeby

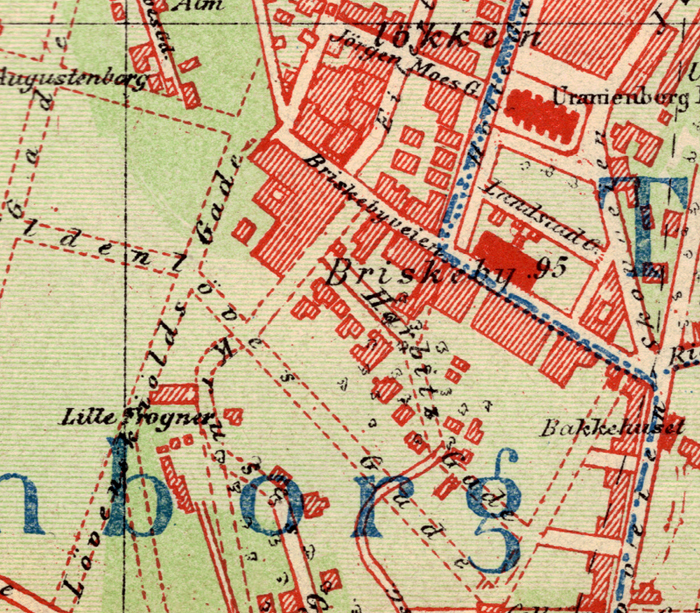
Map of Briskeby, c.1900

Briskeby is an area in the borough Frogner in Oslo, Norway.

Originally a rural area in the former municipality Aker, it was incorporated into Christiania city in 1878. It received public transport with the Briskeby Line in 1894.

== Area ==
The area was originally only west of Briskeby road, but in recent times the areas east of the road are often included, even though they historically belonged to Holteløkken under the Frogner Manor, and Uranienborg. To the north, west and south the boundaries are to the district of Frogner, the farm that it was historically a part of. The boundaries are fluid, but many count Professor Dahl's street as the boundary to the north, Schives Street and President Harbitz' street as the boundary in the west, Meltzer street in the southwest and Skovveien in the southeast.

== History ==
Briskeby was originally two smallhold farms under Frogner Manor that became independent when the property Lille Frogner was separated from the main farm. Briskeby road was the farm's border with Christiania Bymarka (from Skovveien to Holt Street), and from 1859 also the border toward the city itself. The wooden houses that were built here from the 1820s became a suburb of the city, and it retained its character even after Frogner was incorporated into Kristiania city in 1878. Some of the old wooden buildings from this period are preserved.

Briskeby fire station (Industrigata 3) was constructed in 1963 as West End fire station.

One of the first electric tramway lines from Drammensveien to Majorstuen was led through the area in 1894. The line followed (and still follows) Briskeby Road and Holt Street, and it was appropriate named Briskebytrikken.

== Tram ==
The Briskeby Line (Norwegian: Briskebylinjen) is a section of the Oslo Tramway which runs between Jernbanetorget, through the neighborhoods of Briskeby and Uranienborg, before arriving at Majorstuen. The section is served by line 19 (Majorstuen-Briskeby-Nationaltheateret-Jernbanetorget-Ljabru).

In passenger numbers, the Briskeby Line is the smallest line of the entire tram network, with 1,500 daily embarkations along the Briskeby stretch according to a 2004 report.

== Popular culture ==
Briskeby is an electro-pop band from Norway. The band's name is derived from the neighbourhood where their rehearsal room was located.

Hei Briskeby is also a popular YouTube Channel famed by the popular TV show Skam. The people within the channel are characters that feature in the Season 4 cast.
