= Briskebyen, Hedmark =

Neighborhood of Hamar, Norway

Coordinates: 60.794°N 11.091°E

Briskebyen is a neighborhood of Hamar, Norway. Prior to 1946, it was in Vang.
