= Solli (surname) =

Solli is a Norwegian surname that may refer to

- Arne Solli (1938–2017), Norwegian Army general and Chief of Defence of Norway
- Bjarne Daniel Solli (1910–1989), Norwegian politician
- Bjørn Vidar Solli (born 1979), Norwegian jazz musician and composer
- Brit Solli (born 1959), Norwegian archaeologist
- Didrik Solli-Tangen (born 1987), Norwegian singer
- Emil Solli-Tangen (born 1991), Norwegian opera singer, brother of Didrik
- Guro Strøm Solli (born 1983), Norwegian cross-country skier
- Inge Solli (born 1959), Norwegian politician
- Jan Gunnar Solli (born 1981), Norwegian footballer
- Kristin Solli Schøien (born 1954), Norwegian author and composer
- Kristine L. Solli (born 1989), Norwegian politician
- Lavrans Solli (born 1992), Norwegian swimmer
- Lena Solli-Reimann (born 1969), Norwegian hurdler
- Odd Solli (1924–2007), Norwegian bobsledder
- Sivert Solli (born 1997), Norwegian footballer
