= Solli plass =

Square in Oslo, Norway

Coordinates: 59.91467°N 10.71778°E

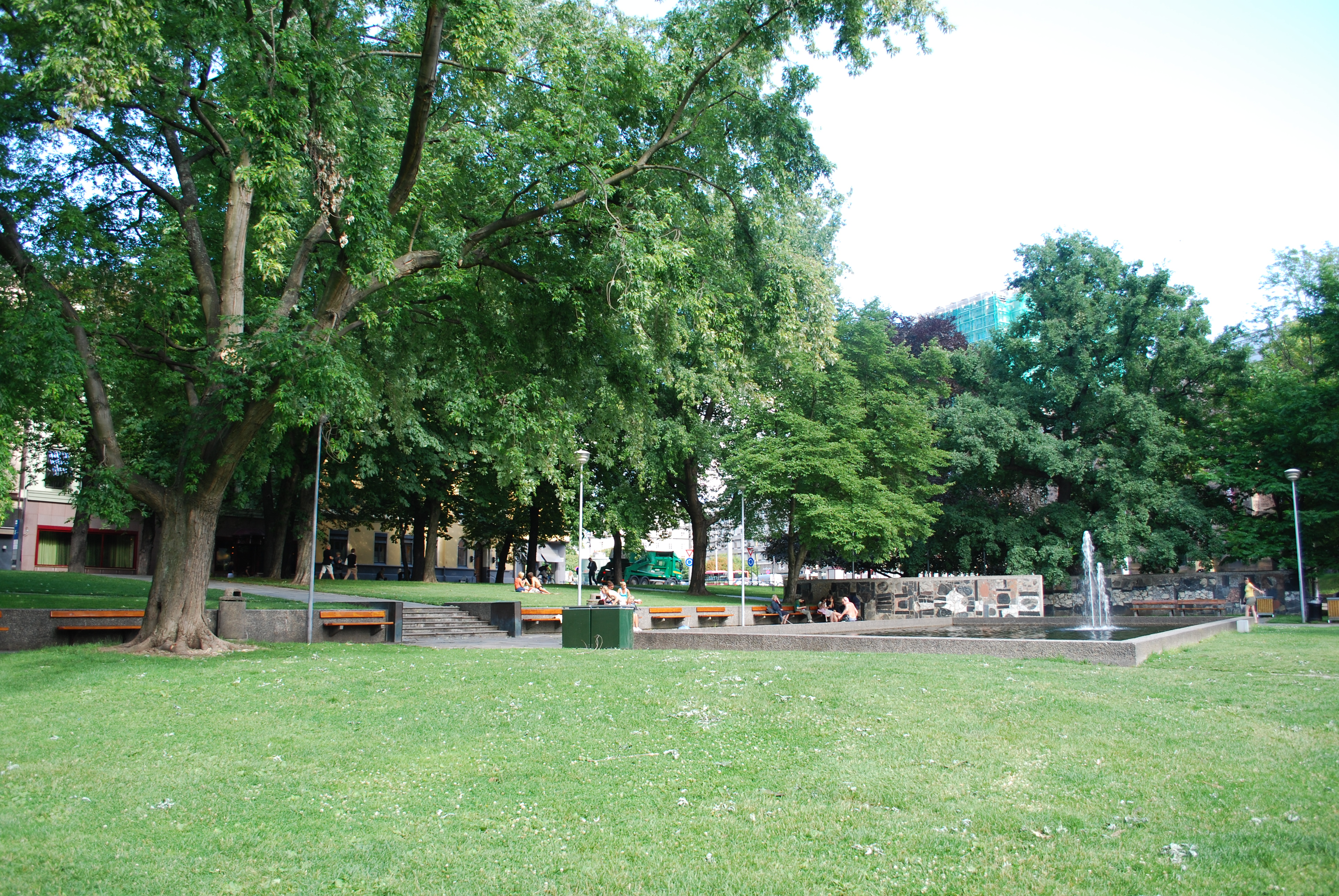
Hydroparken

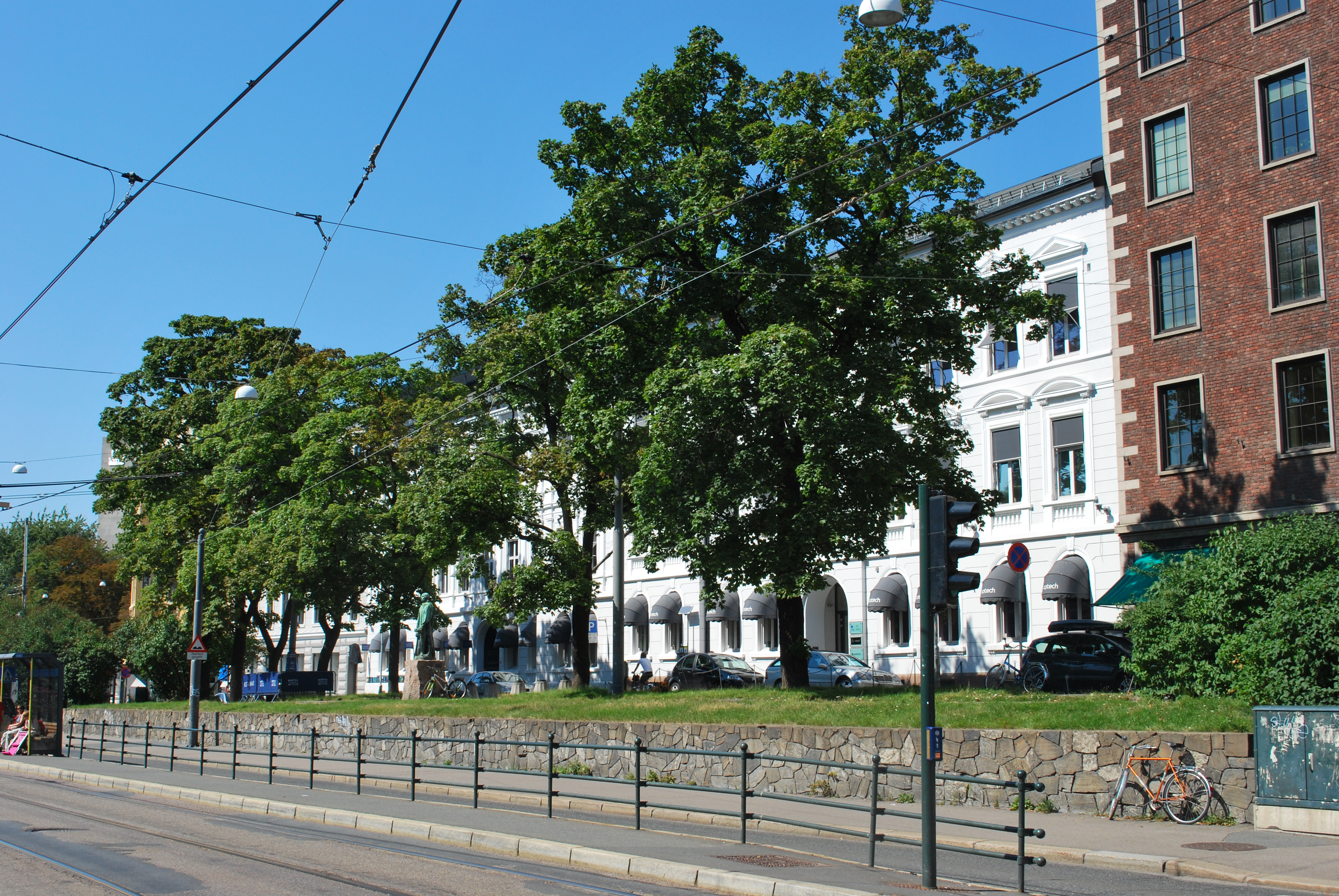
Sommerroparken

Solli plass, pronounced /su:li/ or /suli/, /plas/ or /pɽas/, also called Lapsetorvet, is a square in Oslo, Norway, located southwest of Slottsparken and the Royal Palace.

The square is elliptical in shape. In the southwest lies the National Library of Norway. Further east are several commercial buildings, and the headquarters of the Federation of Norwegian Commercial and Service Enterprises. In the northwest is found the former building of Oslo Lysverker. There are two public parks in the area, Hydroparken in the west and the tiny Sommerroparken in the north.

The name stems from the property Solli, intact from 1716 to 1822. The last owner was Claus Pavels; after him the property was divided. The name Solli plass came to be in 1885.

The square is served by a station on the Oslo Tramway—Solli—as well as buses.
