= Majorstuen station =

Oslo metro station

Majorstuen
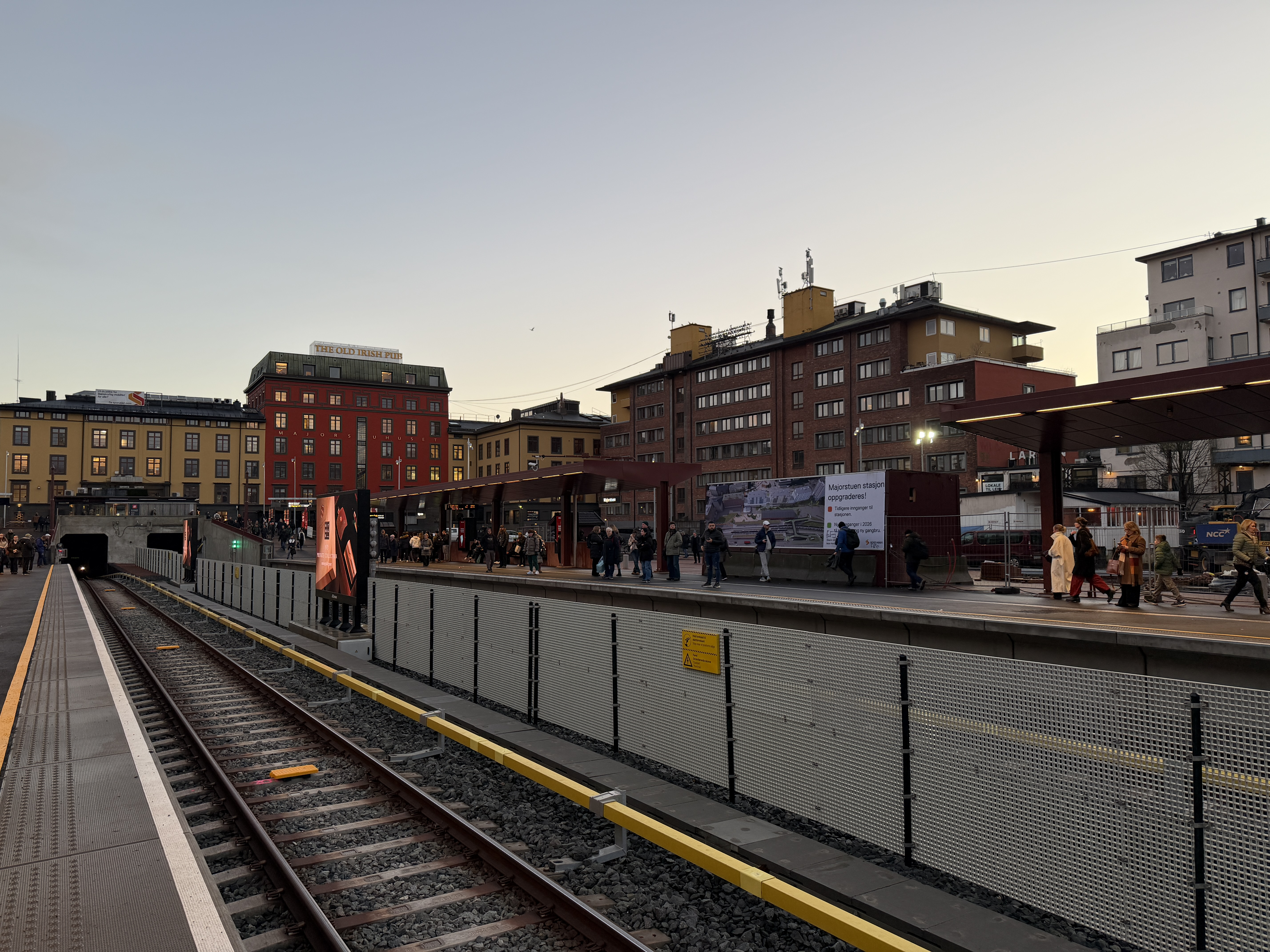
- Majorstuen station, December 2025

General information
- Location: Majorstuen, Oslo; Norway
- Coordinates: 59°55′47″N 10°42′53″E
- Elevation: 47.7 m (156 ft)
- Owner: Sporveien
- Operator: Sporveien T-banen
- Line: Common Tunnel
- Distance: 2.7 km (1.7 mi) from Stortinget
- Tracks: 3
- Connections: Tram: Bus: 20 Skøyen — Galgeberg; 25 Lørenskog stasjon 28 Fornebu— Økern; 45 Voksen skog 46 Ullerntoppen

Construction
- Structure type: At-grade
- Parking: None
- Accessible: Yes

Other information
- Fare zone: 1

History
- Opened: 31 May 1898; 128 years ago

Services
| Preceding station | Oslo Metro | Following station |
|---|---|---|
| Frøen towards Frognerseteren | Line 1 | Nationaltheatret towards Bergkrystallen |
| Borgen towards Østerås | Line 2 | Nationaltheatret towards Ellingsrudåsen |
| Borgen towards Kolsås | Line 3 | Nationaltheatret towards Mortensrud |
| Blindern towards Vestli | Line 4 | Nationaltheatret towards Bergkrystallen |
| Blindern towards Sognsvann | Line 5 | Nationaltheatret towards Vestli |
| Preceding station | Trams in Oslo | Following station |
| Terminus | Line 11 | Bogstadveien towards Kjelsås |
| Terminus | Line 12 | Frogner stadion towards Kjelsås |
| Terminus | Line 19 | Bogstadveien towards Ljabru |
Location

Majorstuen is a subway station on the Oslo Metro and a tram stop on the Briskeby Line of the Oslo Tramway. It is located in the Majorstuen neighborhood in the Frogner borough.

Majorstuen is shared by all the subway lines, and, being located just after the tunnel entrance, it is the only such station not located underground. Majorstuen was originally the end station for Holmenkollbanen, and remained so until the tunnel to Nationaltheatret Station was completed.

After Majorstuen the subway lines split up in three directions. Sognsvannsbanen runs northwards, Holmenkollbanen runs to the northwest while Røabanen and Kolsåsbanen are on a shared track to the west.

The station has three platforms. There are two main platforms facing each other. Behind the platform for outbound trains is a bay platform, used for the trains on the west side of Oslo which terminate at Majorstuen. Such trains are not common, they are usually early-morning trains or trains which are retiring for the evening. Between 2002 and 2004 however, Holmenkollbanen terminated at Majorstuen and all these trains used this platform. Also located on the outbound platform is a Narvesen kiosk, the only such kiosk on the Oslo Metro behind the ticket barriers.

Majorstuen itself is largely a residential area, although there is a great deal of commercial business as well. It is close to the Oslo Tramway Museum, and also serves the MF Norwegian School of Theology, the Norwegian Academy of Music, the Norwegian Police University College and a Police Station, Chateau Neuf and the movie theatre Colosseum. It is a node for public transportation, outside the subway station are bus stops for several bus lines and a tram stop serving the Frogner and Briskeby Lines on Oslo Tramway.
