= Majorstuen =

Neighbourhood in Oslo, Norway

Coordinates: 59°55′45″N 10°42′59″E

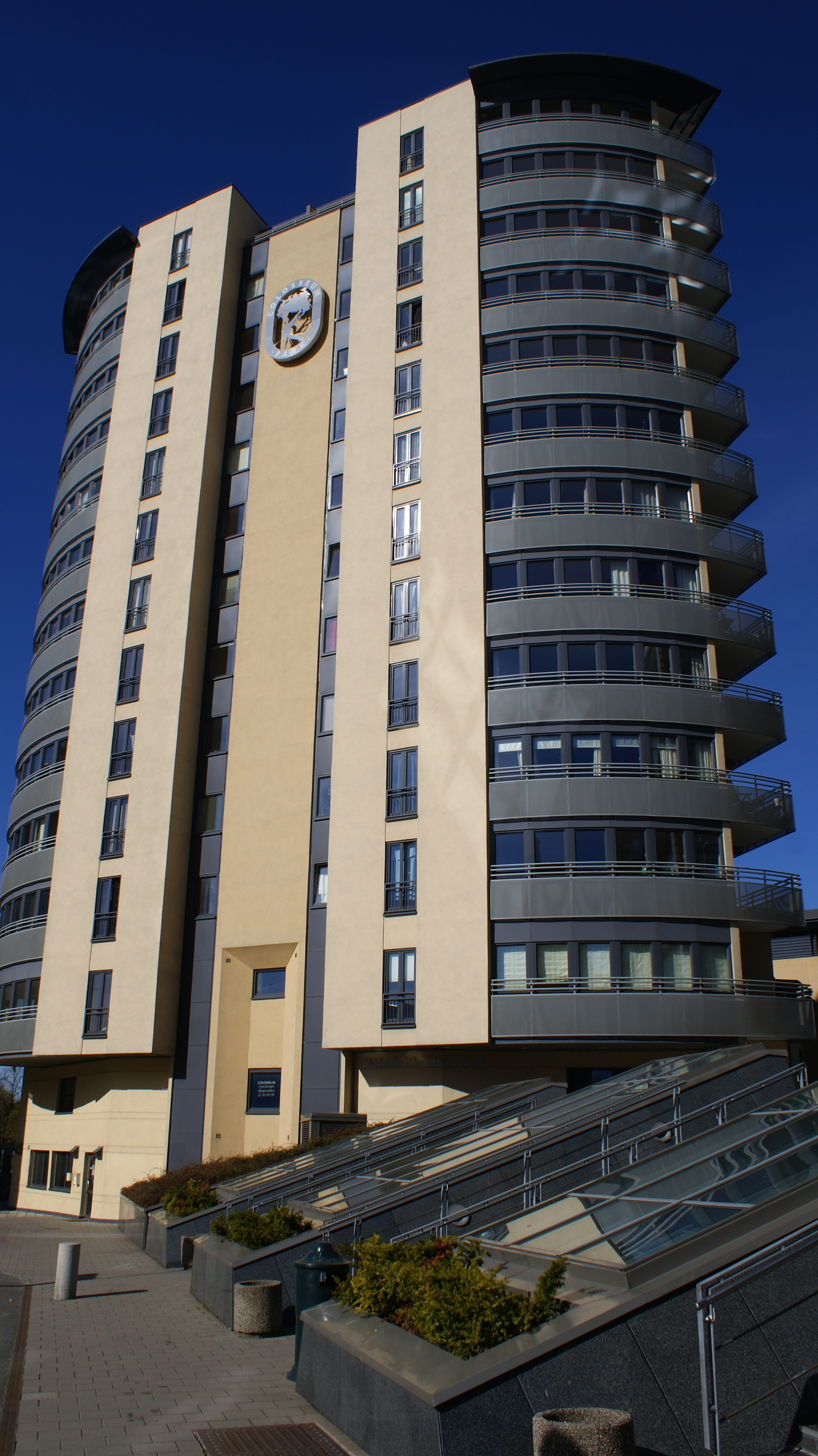
Colosseum Park in Majorstua

Majorstuen or Majorstua is a particularly affluent neighbourhood in the Frogner borough in the inner part of Oslo, Norway.

== The name ==
The neighborhood was named after a well-known public house that was located on the east side of Sørkedalsveien. Dating from the 1700s, the house was named for Captain Michael Wilhelm von Sundt (1679–1753). The last element is the finite form of stue 'cabin, house with a single room'. There has long been a disagreement about the forms Majorstuen and Majorstua: stuen is the articulated form when stue is treated as a masculine, and stua is the articulated form when it is treated as a feminine noun. The original pronunciation was -stua (Norwegian feminine inflection) but, because Danish was the only written language in Norway well into the 19th century, the name was written -stuen (Danish common gender inflection). The locals say either, but the local borough council has also adopted Majorstuen as the official name of the area.

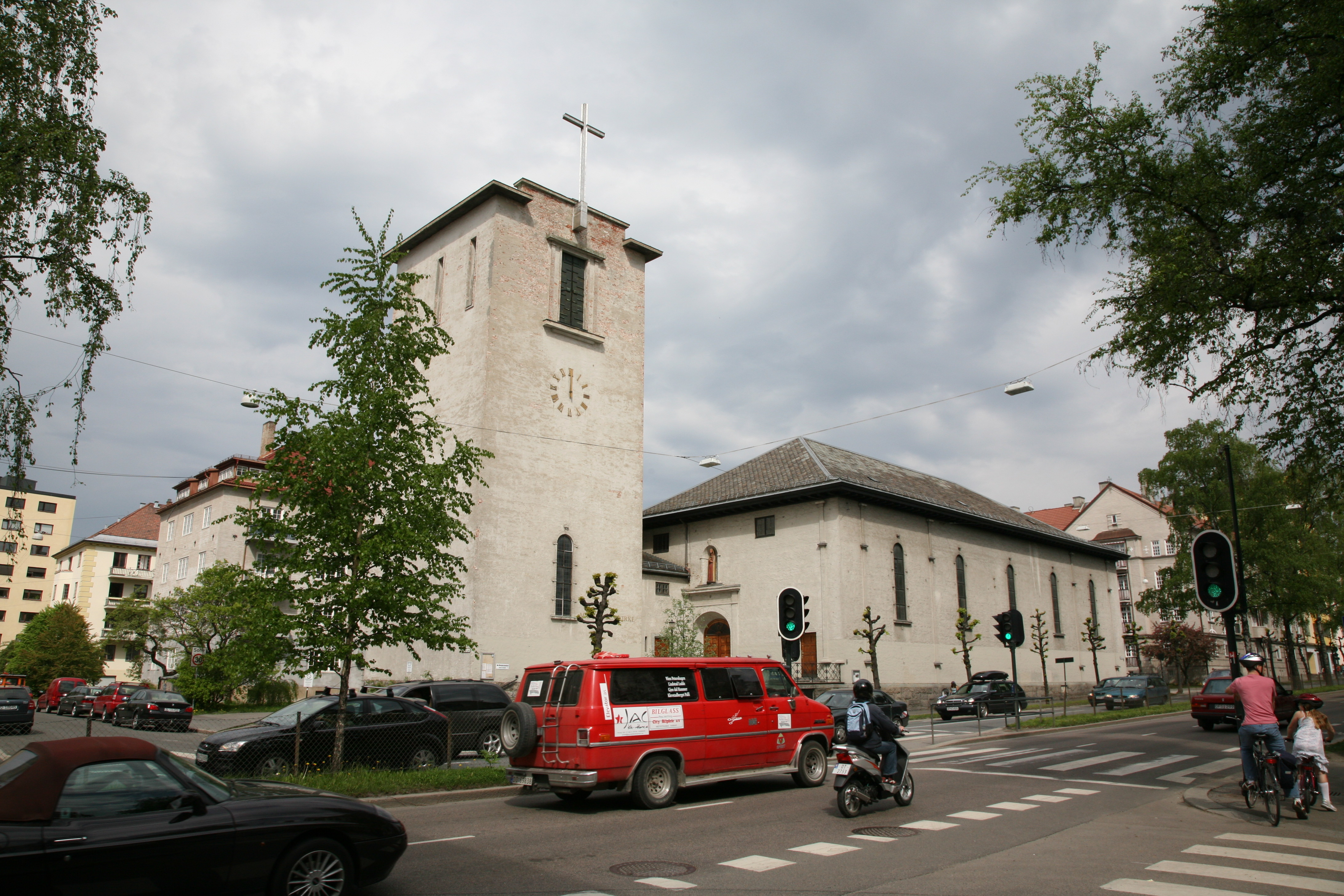
Majorstuen Church

== Majorstuen School ==
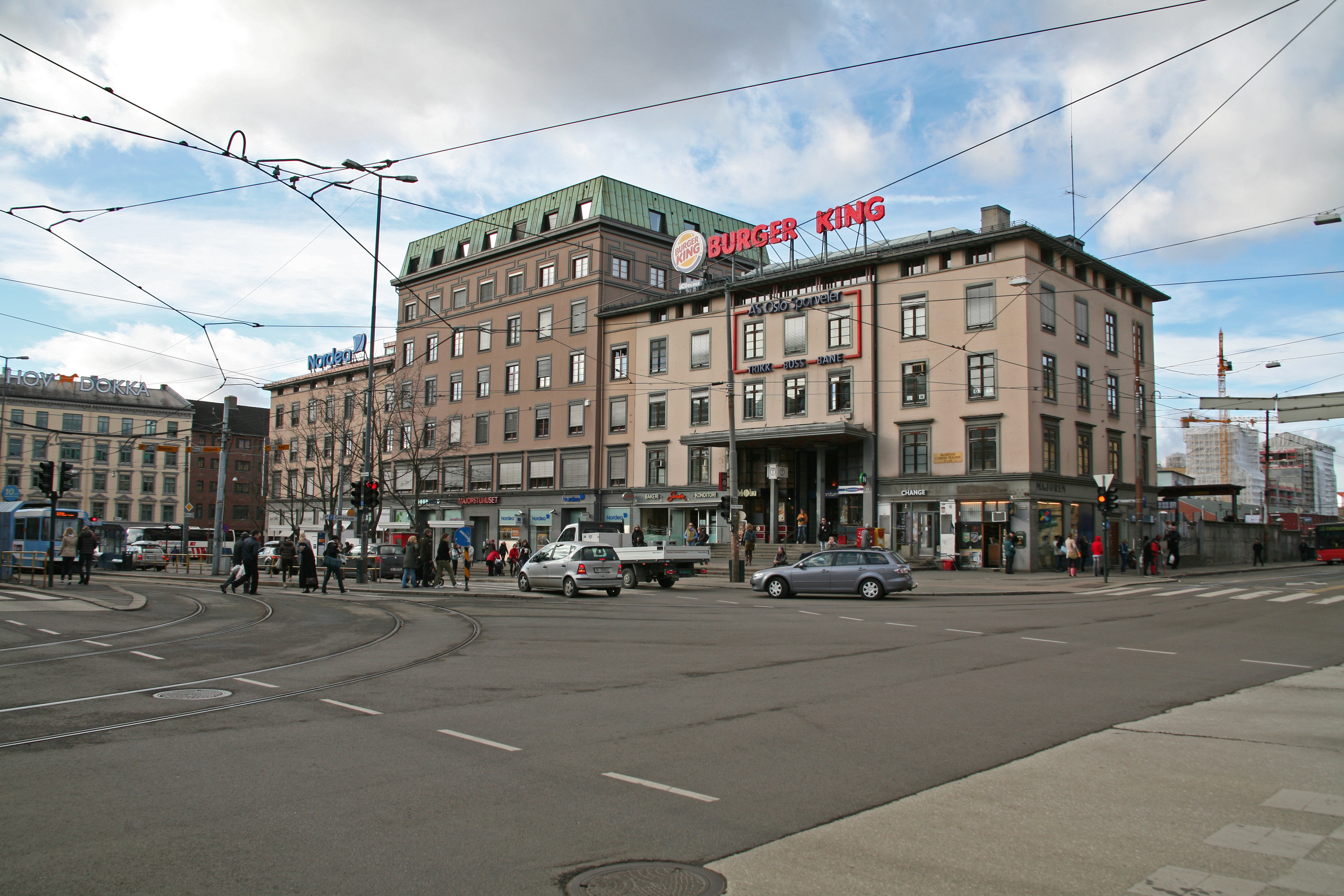
Majorstuen Metro Station

== Other sources ==
- Sandnes, Jørn; Ola Stemshaug (1997, 3rd edition 2007) Norsk Stadnamnleksikon (4th edition) (Det Norske Samlaget) ISBN 978-82-521-4905-0
