= Carl Berners plass station =

Oslo metro station

Carl Berners plass
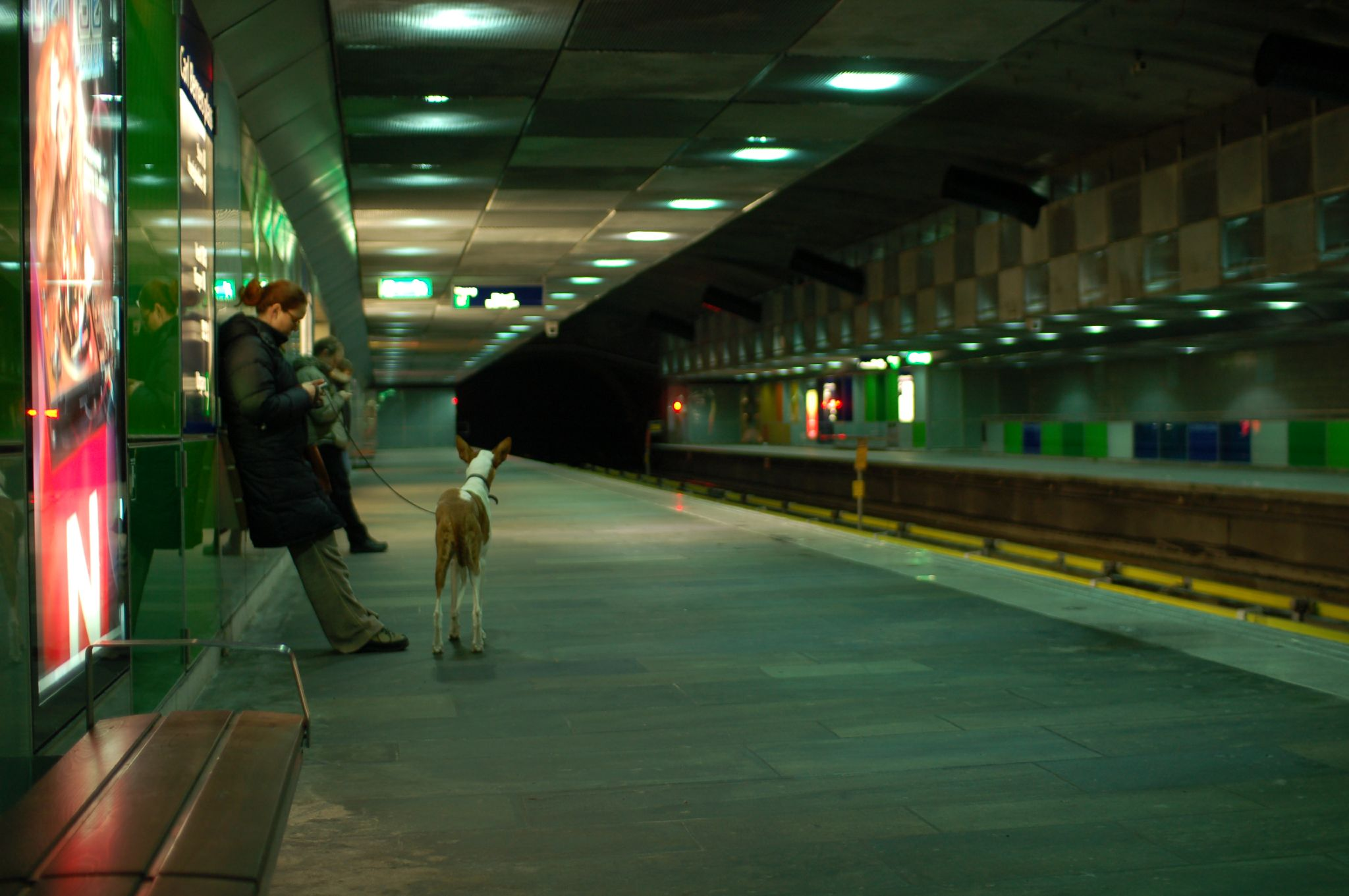

General information
- Location: Carl Berners plass, Helsfyr, Oslo; Norway
- Coordinates: 59°55′32″N 10°46′42″E
- Elevation: 50.3 m (165 ft)
- Owner: Sporveien
- Operator: Sporveien T-banen
- Line: Grorud Line
- Distance: 3.3 km (2.1 mi) from Stortinget
- Connections: Tram: Grefsen – Rikshospitalet; Bus: 20 Galgeberg – Skøyen; 21 Helsfyr – Tjuvholmen; 28 Fornebu — Økern; 31 Snarøya—Fornebu–Tonsenhagen—Grorud T 380 Oslo Bus Terminal — Lillestrøm; 390 Oslo Bus Terminal — Nittedal — Kongskog — Hellerudhaugen; 390E Oslo Bus Terminal — Hellerudhaugen; FB5 Scandinavian Hotel — Oslo Airport

Construction
- Structure type: Underground
- Accessible: Yes

History
- Opened: 1 February 1923 (tram); 16 October 1966 (metro)

Services
Preceding station	Oslo Metro	Following station
Tøyen towards Sognsvann	Line 5	Hasle towards Vestli
Tøyen towards Sognsvann	Line 5	Sinsen towards Vestli
Preceding station	Trams in Oslo	Following station
Sofienberg towards Rikshospitalet	Line 17	Rosenhoff towards Grefsen
Location

Carl Berners plass is an underground rapid transit station located on the Grorud Line of the Oslo Metro, and a tram stop on the Sinsen Line of the Oslo Tramway. The square also has a bus stop for lines 20, 21, 31 and 33. Located at Helsfyr in Oslo, Norway, the area has a mixture of apartment buildings and small businesses. The station is the first metro station on the Grorud Line after it branches off from the shared Common Tunnel. North of the station, the Ring Line branches off from the Grorud Line. The station is served by line 5 of the metro and Line 17 of the tramway, with four hourly departures during regular hours. The tram operates every 10 minutes during regular hours.

The square was taken into use as a tram stop on 1 February 1923. The station took the name after the square, which is again named for the 19th and early 20th-century politician Carl Berner. From 6 February 1949, Line 20 of the Oslo trolleybus started serving the square. From 2 January 1955, the Rodeløkka Line of the tramway was rerouted to run via Carl Berners plass, although it was closed again on 1961. The underground metro station opened on 16 October 1966, and the trolleybus service was replaced by diesel buses in 1968. From 20 August 2006, the metro station also started serving the Ring Line (Line 5).

== Facilities ==
Carl Berners plass is a combined metro, tram and bus station located at the square Carl Berners plass, from which it takes its name. The underground station is actually located a couple of hundred meters off the square, with ground-level entrances on either side of the heavily trafficked Grenseveien as that road ascends from the square towards the east. The underground metro station is on the Grorud Line, and is located 3.3 kilometers (2.1 mi) from Stortinget in the city center. The tracks are 50.3 meters (165 ft) above sea level. The area around the station is mostly dense residential and small businesses. South of the station is Tøyen Park.

== Service ==
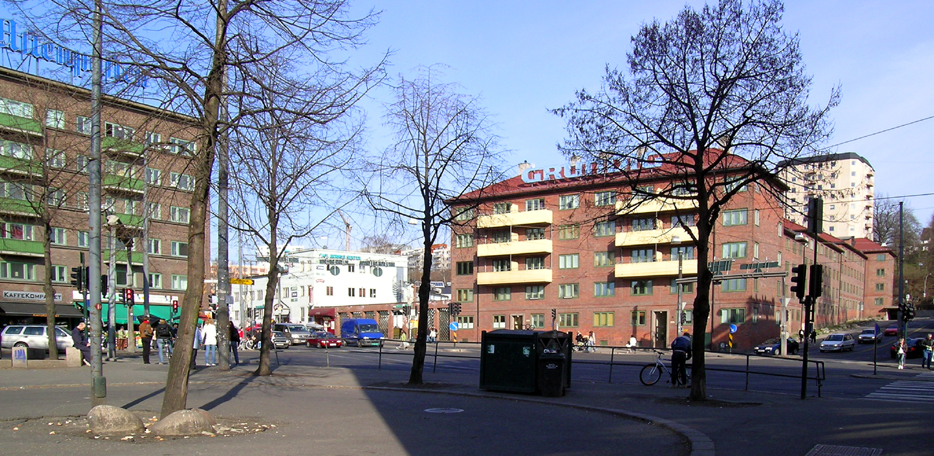
The square above

The rapid transit station is served by line 5 of the Oslo Metro which passes the station twice during a full journey. Southwards, towards the city center, there are eight trains per hour. Northwards the line splits into two branches. One line heads for Hasle bound for Vestli while the other heads for Sinsen on the Ring Line. Each branch has a 15-minute headway. There is a reduced frequency in the late evenings. The metro is operated by Oslo T-banedrift on contract with Ruter. This is one of the Oslo Metro stations in the 5th line accessible to the borough of Helsfyr, the other one being Hasle

The tram stop is served by Line 17 of the Oslo Tramway. It has a ten-minute headway during the day, with half the frequency during evenings and in the weekends. Travel time to Jernbanetorget in the city center is nine minutes, while it is five minutes northwards to Grefsen Station. The service is provided using SL95 trams operated by Oslo Sporvognsdrift on contract with Ruter. Carl Berners plass is one of eight transfer points between the tramway and the metro.

The bus stop serves three full-time services, no. 20, 21 and 31, and two reduced-time services, no. 28 and 33. The bus services are operated by private contractors on contract with Ruter.

== History ==
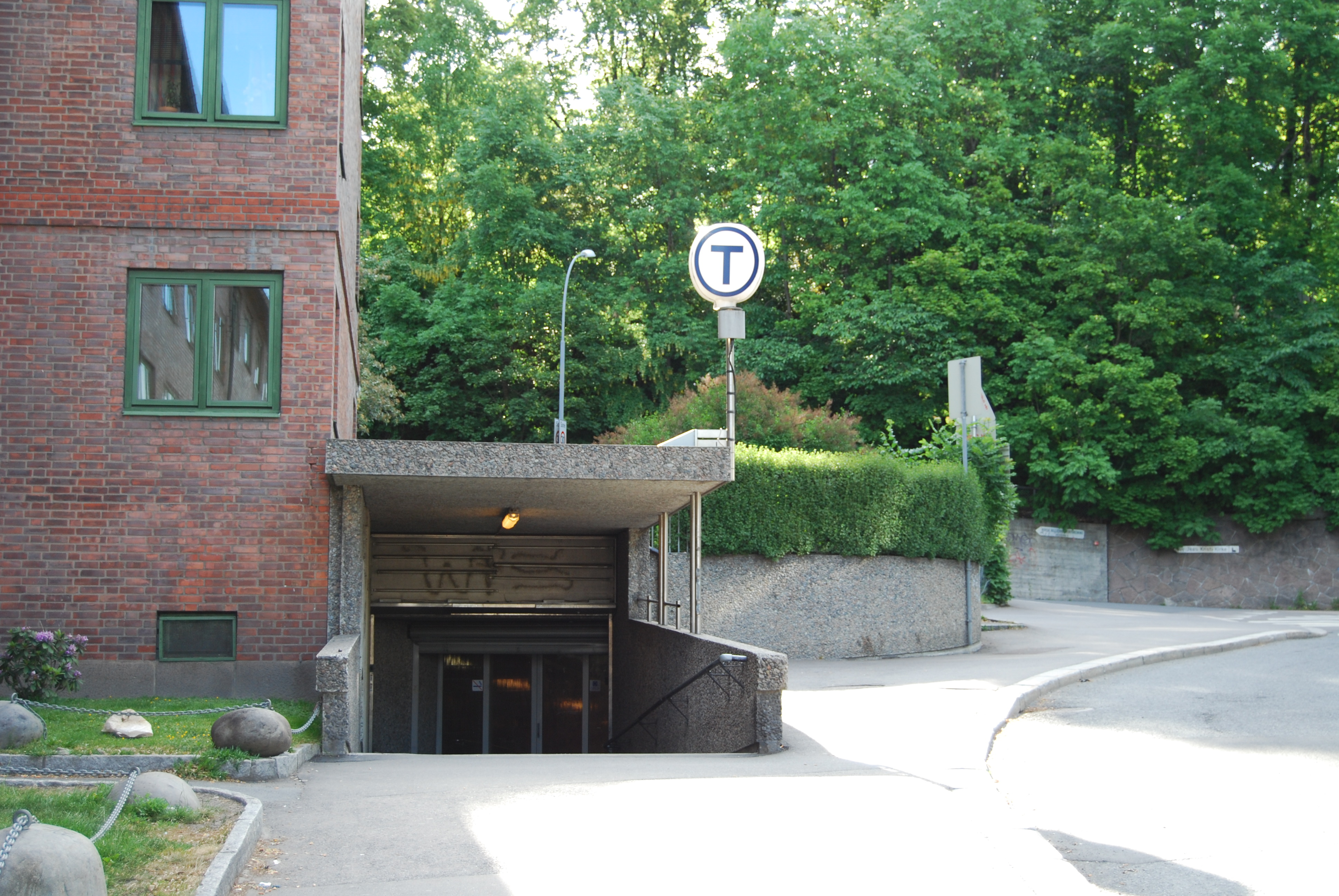
Entrance to the metro station

Carl Berners plass became a public transport station on 1 February 1923, when the then single-track Sinsen Line of the tramway opened as a branch of the Rodeløkka Line. The station took its name from the square it was located at, Carl Berners plass, which is again named for the politician Carl Berner. The station was served by the newly created Line 13 that operated through the city center and ran every twelve minutes, and since 29 June 1924 every fifteen minutes. The line was built by Kristiania Sporveisselskap, but they were taken over by the municipality in 1924, and the line became part of Oslo Sporveier. On 28 June 1938, the line was rebuilt to double track. From 19 December 1939, the line was extended along Trondheimsveien to Sinsen; this section was built with double track. In 1948, the tracks at Carl Berners plass was rebuilt to run through the roundabouts at both ends of the square. The station was served by various services numbers along the Sinsen Line, including 1, 3, 7, 13 and 17, although not all at the same time. At the most, three services operated to the station, giving a five-minute headway.

On 6 February 1949, Oslo trolleybus lines were installed to cross the tram lines at Carl Berners plass to allow Line 20 to be electrically operated. The original Rodeløkka Line was closed in 1949, but new branch line to Rodeløkka was opened on 2 January 1955, because the tram gave lower operating costs than the bus. The line ran from Carl Berners plass down Dælenengata. From 1959, the Rodeløkka Line was reduced to a rush-hour only service and was terminated on 23 April 1961. The tracks were removed from 1962 to 1964. The metro station at Carl Berners plass was opened along with the Grorud Line on 16 October 1966. The metro station was designed by Per Qvam. In 1968, the trolleybus lines were removed from Carl Berners plass and Line 20 to a diesel service.

The Sinsen Line was among those proposed for closure in 2002 when the tram company attempted to save money by transferring the traffic to buses. A city grant of 25 million Norwegian krone (NOK) saved the line along with several others. The metro station was for many years in bad need of rehabilitation, with dim lighting at the platforms, grimy walls, and broken roof tiles leaving piping and wiring exposed. Architect Reiulf Ramstad, who was in charge of the renewal project, compared the station to the scenery of a horror movie. The 2006 renovation involved making the station brighter lit, and a new entrance was built which attempted to make the station more visible from outside. Upgrading of the station included letting parts of sculpture exhibitions by the Norwegian Sculpture Society be placed inside the station area. From 20 August 2006, Carl Berners plass also started serving the Ring Line of the metro. The line branches off from the Grorud Line north of Carl Berners plass, and the station thereby became the transfer station between the Ring Line and the Grorud Line. From 2008, the square itself was rebuilt to become more pedestrian-friendly.
