= Oslo Spektrum =

Multi-purpose indoor arena in Norway

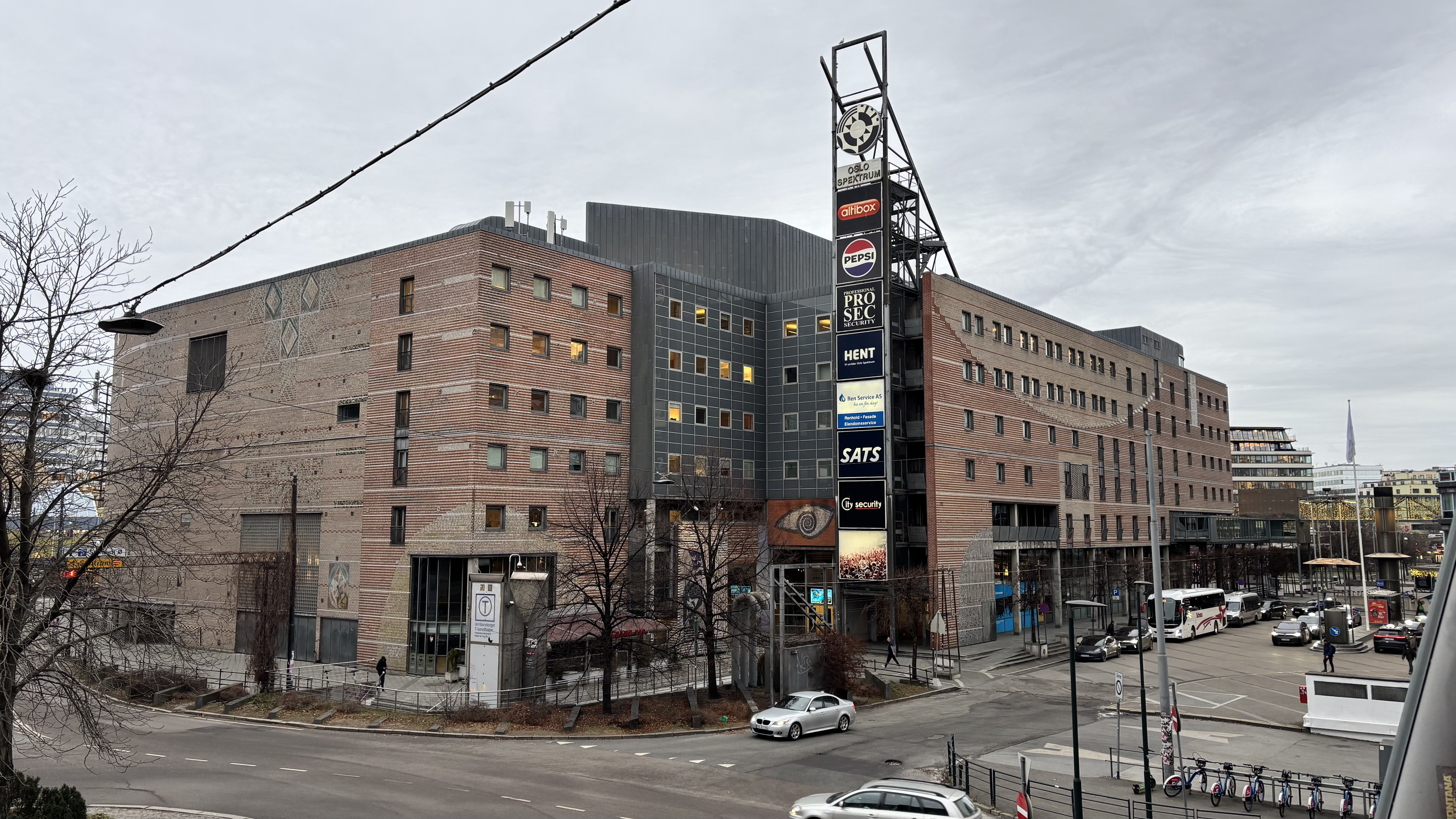
- Oslo Spektrum seen from Sonja Henies plass
- Interactive map of Oslo Spektrum
- Address: Sonja Henies plass 2, 0185 Oslo, Norway
- Location: Sentrum, Oslo
- Coordinates: 59°54′46.6″N 10°45′16.7″E
- Owner: Nova Spektrum
- Operator: Nova Spektrum
- Capacity: 6,500 (sport); 9,700 (concerts); 11,500 (max)
- Public transit: Metro: Jernbanetorget stasjon Tram: Jernbanetorget stasjon Bus: Oslo Bus Terminal; Train: Oslo Central Station

Construction
- Groundbreaking: 1988
- Opened: December 1990
- Renovated: 2025–present
- Expanded: 2025–present
- Architect: LPO Arkitektkontor AS

Tenants
- Vålerenga (Eliteserien) (1990–1993); Spektrum Flyers (Eliteserien) (1994–1996)

Website
- www.oslospektrum.no

Oslo Spektrum is a multi-purpose indoor arena located in east central Oslo, Norway. It was opened in December 1990 under ownership and operation of Nova Spektrum, formerly Norges Varemesse. It is located in Downtown Oslo, next to the Central Station, long and medium haul bus terminal, Jernbanetorget public transportation hub and the international ferry terminals.

Oslo Spektrum is primarily known for hosting such events as the annual Nobel Peace Prize Concert and Eurovision Song Contest 1996.

== History ==
=== Construction and opening ===
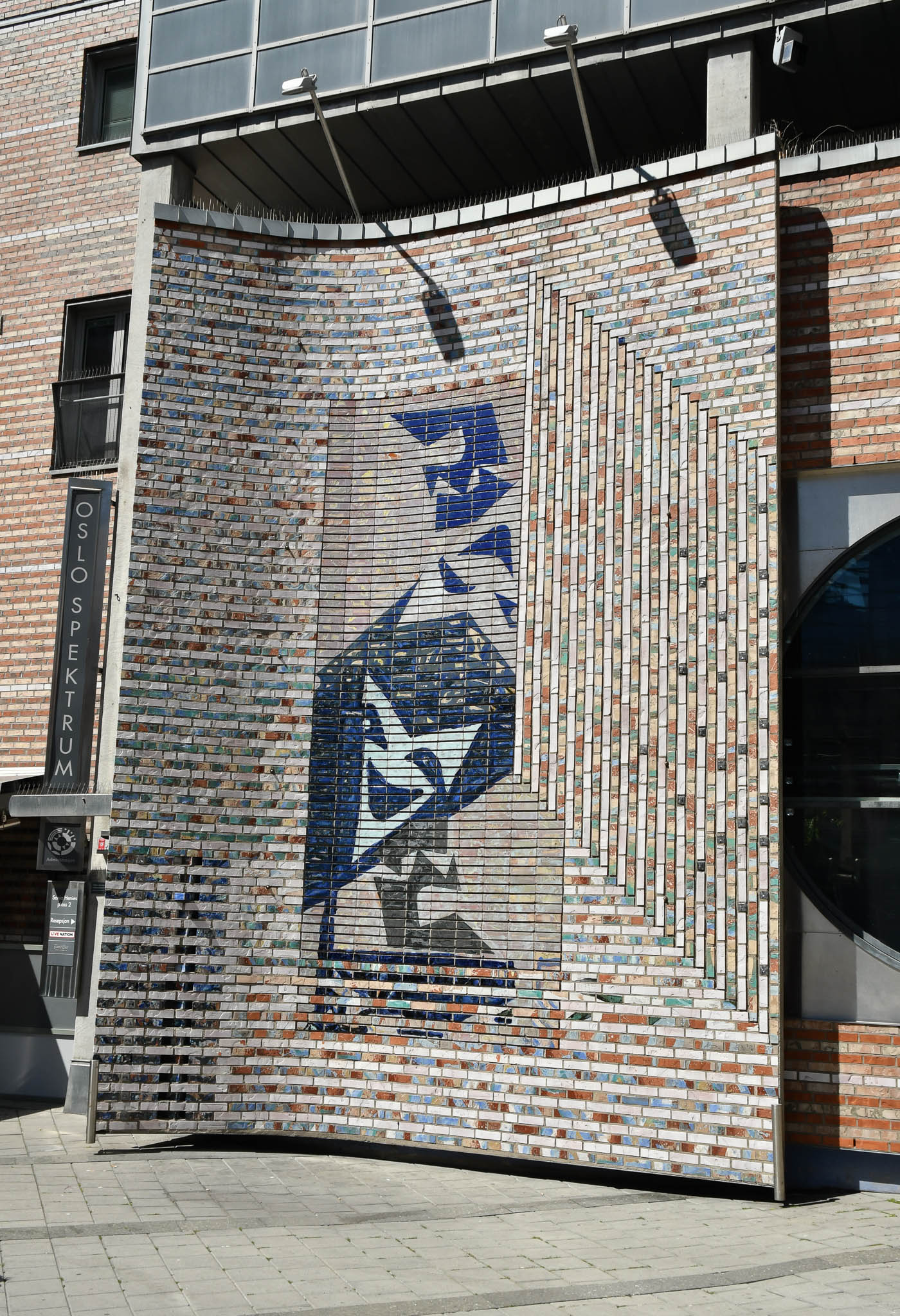
One of the mosaic tile installations (June 2022)

Oslo Spektrum was built as part of a large-scale redevelopment of the formerly industrial Grønland/Vaterland area. It was developed and designed by LPO Arkitektkontor AS, and its exterior walls were decorated with a mosaic made out of almost 400,000 unique tiles and containing fragments of prints by the artist Rolf Nesch. As Nesch has been deceased since 1975, head of the project obtained a permission from his living relatives to use his work, which was installed under the supervision of painter Guttorm Guttormsgaard and ceramic artist Søren Ubisch. In 2004, Oslo Spektrum was awarded the Oslo City Council's award for outstanding architectural achievement.

Although Oslo Spektrum was intended primarily for ice hockey and featured built-in ice making facilities, it was conceived as a multi-purpose arena. From 1994 to 1996, it was home arena of the professional ice hockey team Spektrum Flyers, but the arena proved to be too large and too expensive for the club, and it was ultimately relocated to Bergen.

The arena had a seated capacity of 9,700 for concerts, which can be increased to 11,500 when combined with a standing audience, and 6,500 during sporting events.

=== Development and renovation ===
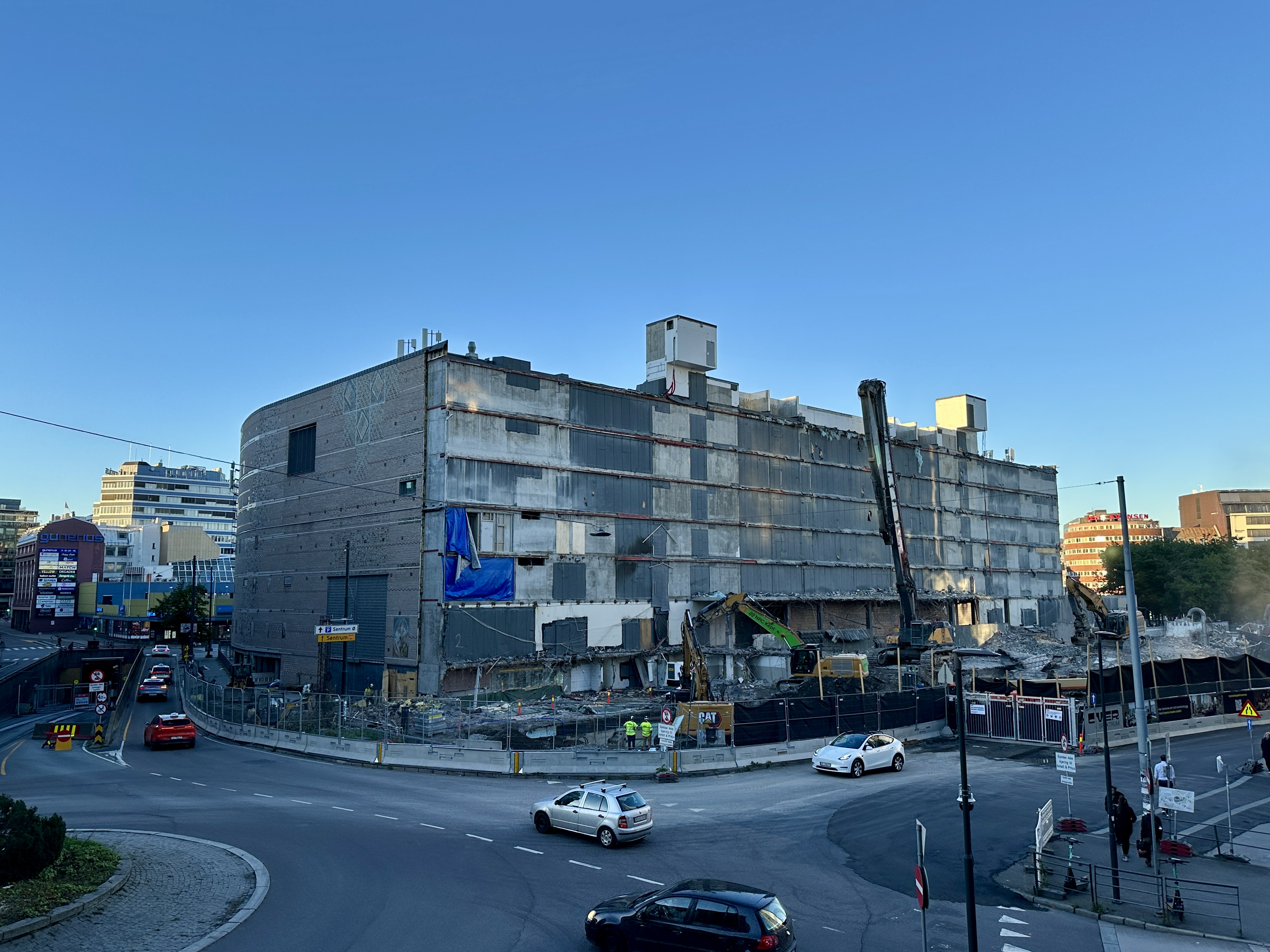
Oslo Spektrum during renovation (2025)

In June 2017, the owner notified Norges Varemesse that they were planning to renovate and expand the arena for more than NOK 1 billion. Among other things, the prospected construction included a new congress centre, cultural venue and high-rise office building adjacent to the venue as an extension with around 3,000 seats and a total of 20,000 additional square metres. The development was scheduled to start in 2020, and the new centre was expected to open in 2023. The goal of the development was to make Oslo better equipped to be Scandinavia's "conference capital". Additionally, the former concert hall, with an audience capacity of approximately 9,700 seats, would be refurbished and include 1,700 extra seats. The renovation work was scheduled to start in the summer of 2019, but only started in June 2025 after several years of delays, with the main concert arena expected to be completed in autumn 2026 and the remaining work in autumn 2028. It will include the first high-rise building over 100 metres to be built in Oslo in more than thirty years. The project is estimated to cost 3.2 billion NOK.

== Events ==
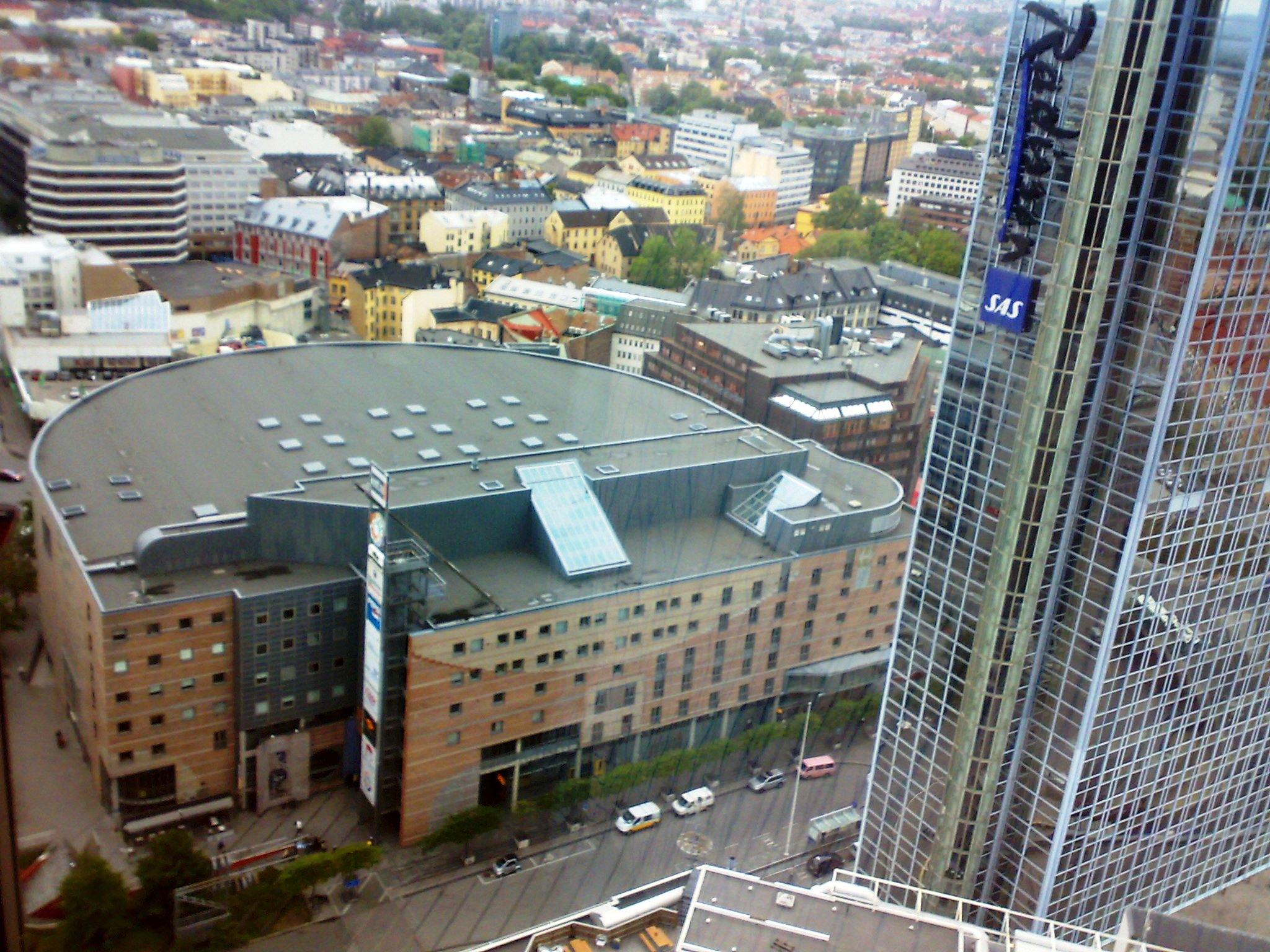
Oslo Spektrum, next to the Oslo Plaza hotel (2008)

While the arena is now rarely used for ice hockey, it regularly hosts ice shows like Disney on Ice. It also hosts the Norwegian Handball Championships, for a period becoming Norway's largest handball arena. Other notable events that have been regularly held here include the Nobel Peace Prize Concert, Norwegian Idol finals, Spellemannsprisen (Norwegian music awards), the Norwegian Military Tattoo, Norwegian song contests Melodi Grand Prix and Melodi Grand Prix Junior, and the Oslo Horse Show.

As of 2014, Spektrum hosted a total of 60–70 events annually attended approximately by 400,000 visitors. Of these, 70% are concerts by major national and international artists, 10% are other types of entertainment shows, 13% are fairs, conferences and corporate events, and only 3% are sporting events.

A number of music artists have performed at the venue such as Destiny's Child, Louis Tomlinson, Taylor Swift, Tate McRae, Bob Dylan, Alan Walker, Toto, Frank Sinatra, Peter Gabriel, Depeche Mode, Nine Inch Nails, The Prodigy, Oasis, The Cure, Whitney Houston, Shirley Bassey, Tina Turner, Cher, Mariah Carey, Diana Ross, Britney Spears, Backstreet Boys, Kylie Minogue, Janet Jackson, Shania Twain, Westlife, Selena Gomez, Carrie Underwood, Christina Aguilera, Anastacia, Spice Girls, Lady Gaga, Michael Bublé, Lana Del Rey, Green Day, Metallica, Vanilla (group), Muse, Rammstein, a-ha, Red Hot Chili Peppers, Snoop Dogg, Ariana Grande, Nicki Minaj and Marcus & Martinus.

== See also ==
- List of indoor arenas in Norway
- List of indoor arenas in Nordic countries

Preceded by Point Theatre; Dublin	Eurovision Song Contest; Venue; 1996	Succeeded by Point Theatre; Dublin
