= Common Tunnel =

Metro tunnel in Oslo, Norway

Coordinates: 59°54′46.969″N 10°44′29.288″E

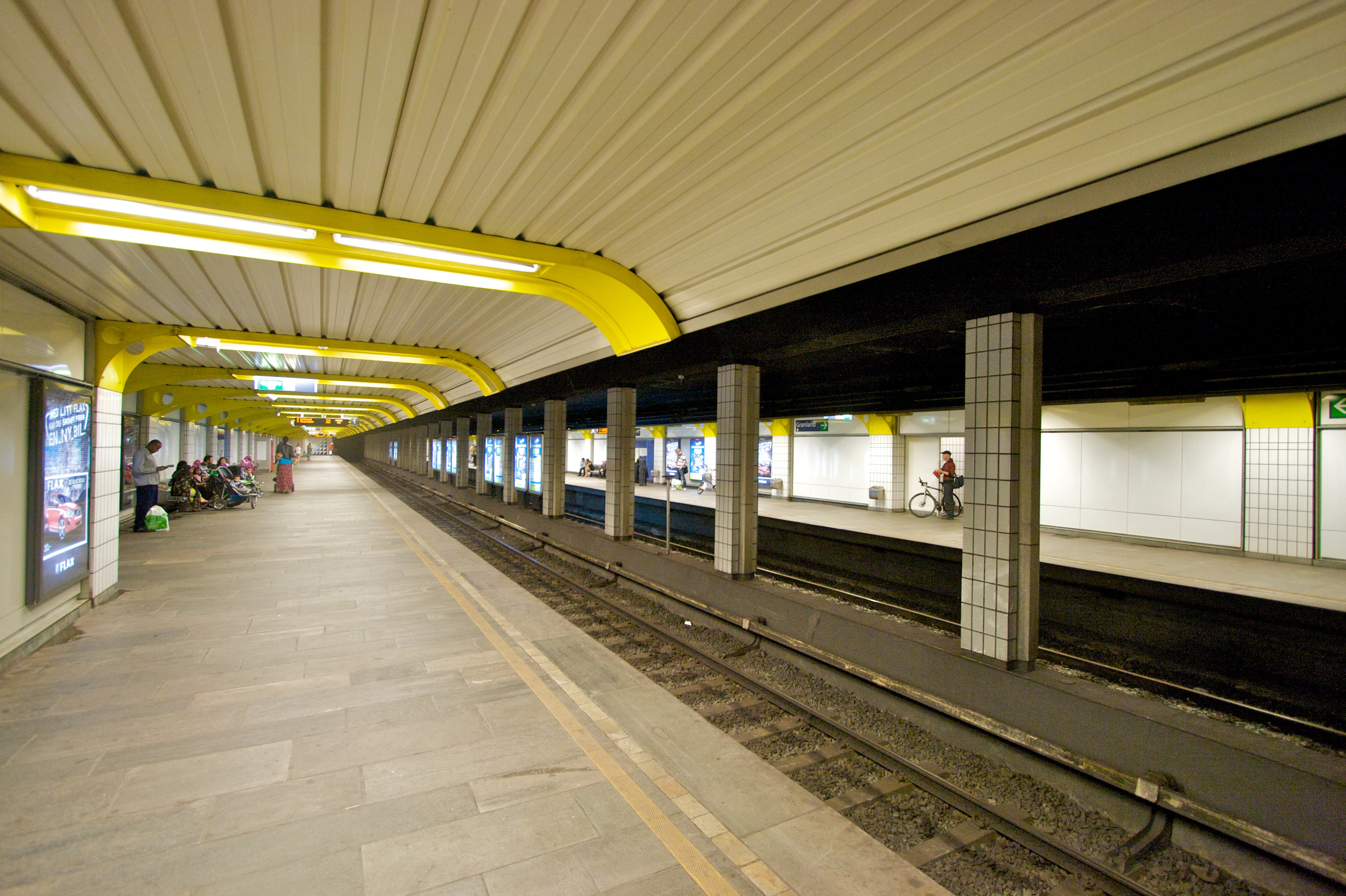
- Grønland Station

Overview
- Native name: Fellestunnelen
- Owner: Sporveien
- Termini: Majorstuen; Tøyen
- Stations: 6

Service
- Type: Rapid transit
- System: Oslo Metro
- Operator: Sporveien T-banen
- Rolling stock: MX3000

History
- Opened: 28 June 1928 (to Nationaltheatret); 7 March 1987 (to Stortinget)

Technical
- Line length: 7.3 km (4.5 mi)
- Number of tracks: Double
- Track gauge: 1,435 mm (4 ft 8 1/2 in) standard gauge
- Electrification: 750 V DC third rail
- Operating speed: 70 km/h (43 mph)

The Common Tunnel (Norwegian: Fellestunnelen), sometimes called the Common Line (Fellesstrekningen), is a 7.3-kilometer (4.5 mi) long tunnel of the Oslo Metro which runs through the city center of Oslo, Norway. The name derives from the fact that all five lines of the metro use the tunnel, which runs from Majorstuen to Tøyen. The section has six stations, including the four busiest on the metro.

The tunnel was first built as two separate tunnels which were later connected. The Holmenkolbanen company opened the western section of the tunnel from Majorstuen via Valkyrie plass to Nationaltheatret in 1928. In 1966, the Oslo Metro opened, including the tunnel from Tøyen via Grønland to Jernbanetorget. In 1977, the eastern end was extended to Sentrum, but the extension was closed in 1983 because of water leakages. In 1987, the Sentrum station reopened as Stortinget, and became the terminus of both the western and eastern lines. By 1993, the western end had been upgraded to metro standard, Valkyrie plass was closed, and the first trains ran through the whole tunnel.

The section from Tøyen to Brynseng, although not completely located within the tunnel, is considered part of the Common Line. At Majorstuen, the line splits into three; the Røa Line, the Holmenkollen Line and the Sognsvann Line. At Tøyen, the line splits into the Lambertseter Line and the Grorud Line. The tunnel is the bottleneck of the metro, allowing 24 trains per hour in each direction west of Stortinget, and 28 east of Stortinget.

== Route ==
Schematic of the metro network, showing that all lines run through the Common Tunnel.

The Common Tunnel is a 7.3-kilometer (4.5 mi) long double track rapid transit line running east from Majorstuen to Tøyen and onwards to Brynseng. The section from Tøyen to Brynseng is partially above ground and is only sometimes considered part of the tunnel and the Common Line. At Tøyen, the Grorud Line branches and continues past Carl Berners plass as part of the same tunnel. From Carl Berners plass to Ensjø, there is a single-track branch, which allows trains access to the other eastern lines without having to change direction. Three stations serve the city center: Nationaltheatret, Stortinget and Jernbanetorget, while Majorstuen, Tøyen and Grønland serve mixed residential and commercial areas.

== Service ==
All five lines of the Oslo Metro, numbered 1 to 5, run through the Common Tunnel. Most services have a 15-minute headway, which is increased to 30 minutes in the late evening and early on Sundays. Two lines have more frequent service. Line 2, which runs on the Furuset Line, has its headway reduced to 7.5 minutes and runs the entire tunnel. Line 3 on the Østensjø Line also has extra trains that terminate at Stortinget giving a 7.5 minute frequency on the east side of the tunnel. Line 5 trains run once around the Ring Line before continuing to their final destinations and therefore make two passes through the tunnel on a complete journey. Travel time from Majorstuen to Tøyen takes eight minutes. The tunnel is the bottleneck of the metro, with a capacity for 24 trains per hour in each direction west of Stortinget, and 28 east of Stortinget.

Transfer to the Oslo Tramway is available at four stations, Majorstuen, Nationaltheatret, Stortinget and Jernbanetorget. Transfer to the mainline railway is available at Nationaltheatret to the railway station with the same name, and at Jernbanetorget to Oslo Central Station (Oslo S). Nationaltheatret offers shorter transfer distance, but only serves trains along the Drammen Line. Interchange with buses is possible at all stations except Grønland. Majorstuen acts as an interchange between the western lines, while transfer between the eastern lines can be done at Tøyen. The public transport authority Ruter recommends that interchange between lines in the same direction should be made at Grønland.

== History ==
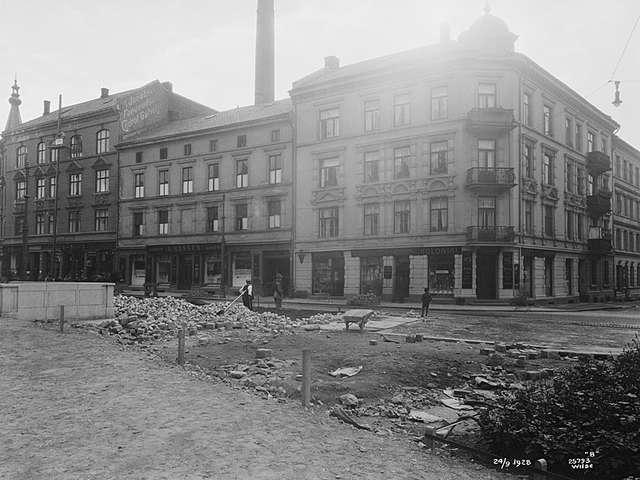
Construction work at Valkyrie plass in 1928

=== West end ===
In 1898, the Holmenkollen Line was opened as a light rail between Majorstuen to Holmenkollen. The terminus at Majorstuen was an inconvenience for passengers as most people were bound for the city center and had to change to the street trams. For the operator Holmenkolbanen, there were two ways to solve the issue. They could sign trackage rights with Kristiania Elektriske Sporvei to use the Briskeby Line to reach the city center. Alternatively, a tunnel could be built to an underground station in the city center. Applications for a tunnel were sent to the municipality in 1901. However, disagreements as to whether the tunnel was to be considered a railway or tramway halted progress; the city considered the line a tramway while the company considered it to be a railway.

A new application was submitted in November 1907, which proposed a single track line to the intersection of Karl Johans gate and Fredriks gate, and was estimated to cost 1.5 million Norwegian krone (NOK). The plans drew criticism from city officials, who stated that the line would take passengers away from the existing tram line and that it would stimulate migration to the areas along the Holmenkollen Line in the neighboring municipality of Aker, thus reducing the tax income for the city. In 1909, Oslo City Council stated in a letter to the government that they were opposed to the tunnel. On 9 June 1911, the city council had nonetheless changed its mind, and voted to accept the tunnel if the terminus was moved to the intersection of Karl Johans gate and Ruseløkkveien, but this was rejected by the company. On 27 May 1909, Aker Municipal Council voted in favor of the tunnel, and on 9 June 1911 the proposal was passed by the Parliament of Norway. Both municipalities wanted the redemption right, which would allow them to purchase the railway at a later date, but this was instead given to the state. On 15 December 1911, Holmenkolbanen received a concession through a royal decree, which would last for 60 years from the date of opening.

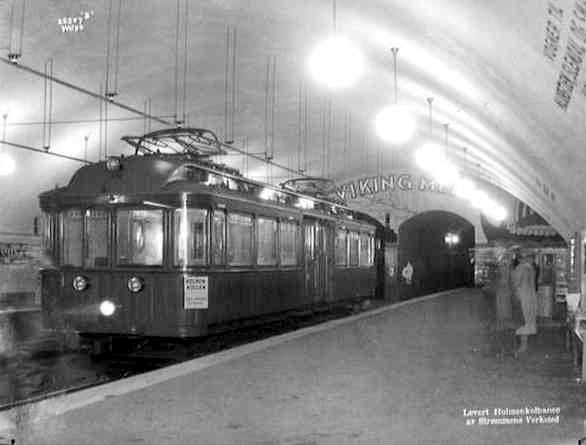
Tram at Nationaltheatret in 1928

Construction on the central parts of the tunnel started in 1912. At the time, an agreement had not been reached with the municipality about the location of the terminus. In October, there was a landslip at Valkyrie plass, resulting in a cavity. Thirty properties sustained cracks and other damage, and the owners threatened Holmenkolbanen with a lawsuit to reclaim the cost of repairs. By October 1914, the tunnel works had been completed from Rosenborggaten to the statue of Karl Johan in the Palace Park (Slottsparken). The issue of the terminus was still not resolved, and work was therefore halted. Holmenkolbanen were planning on building the line through the city center, and therefore wanted the terminus at Fredriks gate, while the municipality wanted it at Ruseløkkveien.

In 1915, the city launched a competition for a plan for city's light rail system. However, the invitations were not issued until two years later. The winner was announced in July 1918, and in September 1919, a municipal committee concluded on how the network should be expanded. Firstly, it proposed connecting the Lilleaker Line to Majorstuen. Secondly, it proposed a tunnel through the city center, from Majorstuen to Stortorvet and Vaterland, and onwards as an elevated line eastwards, along routes that closely resemble the current metro lines and the Ekeberg Line. From Stortorvet, a northern branch was proposed which would be built towards Kjelsås. Finally, the committee wanted a circular line north of the city center, closely resembling to the current Ring Line.

The proposal forced the municipality to reconsider the terminus of the tunnel. The executive committee supported terminating the tunnel at Eidsvolls plass, but this was rejected by the city council on 13 July 1920. Holmenkolbanen convinced the municipality to establish a committee to look into the specific issue. In September 1921, the committee proposed creating a temporary terminus, following Holmenkolbanen's route, in the square behind the National Theatre (Norwegian: Nationaltheatret). This was under the condition that experts concluded that construction would be done without damage to surrounding buildings. The proposal was passed by the city council on 13 October 1921. In June 1922, an expert committee concluded that construction would be satisfactory.

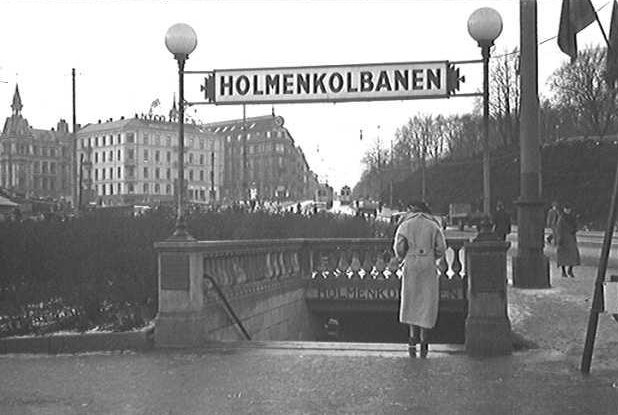
Entrance to Nationaltheatret in 1935

Aker Municipality held an option to purchase the Røa Line, should the tunnel not be completed by November 1922. On 11 November 1922, the municipal council executed the option. Aker had recently established the tram company Akersbanerne, and merged the Røa Line into Akersbanerne from 1 November 1924. In June 1923, the executive committee voted to allow a temporary terminus at Nationaltheatret, given that Holmenkolbanen would be obliged to continue the line onwards to Studenterlunden. The company did not accept the new terms, and the city council finally passed a proposal that the company could accept on 3 April 1924. However, by then traffic had increased on the Holmenkollen Line, the Røa Line had been connected to Majorstuen, and the Sognsvann Line was under planning. This caused Holmenkolbanen to change the tunnel to double track. To finance the construction, the company borrowed NOK 11.5 million.

In 1925, Oslo District Court found Holmenkolbanen not guilty in the lawsuit over damages at Valkyrie plass. A concession was granted on 15 January 1926, which demanded that the tunnel open by the end of 1928. A change of plans moved the line's route to Valkyriegaten under Valkyrie plass, which allowed the cavity from 1912 to become a station, despite it only being 300 meters (980 ft) from Majorstuen. Past Slottsparken, the original track had been built at an increased depth to allow for a future extension of the Drammen Line of the Norwegian State Railways (NSB) to run above the light rail tunnel. By 1926, these plans had been discarded, and the second track was not built as deep.

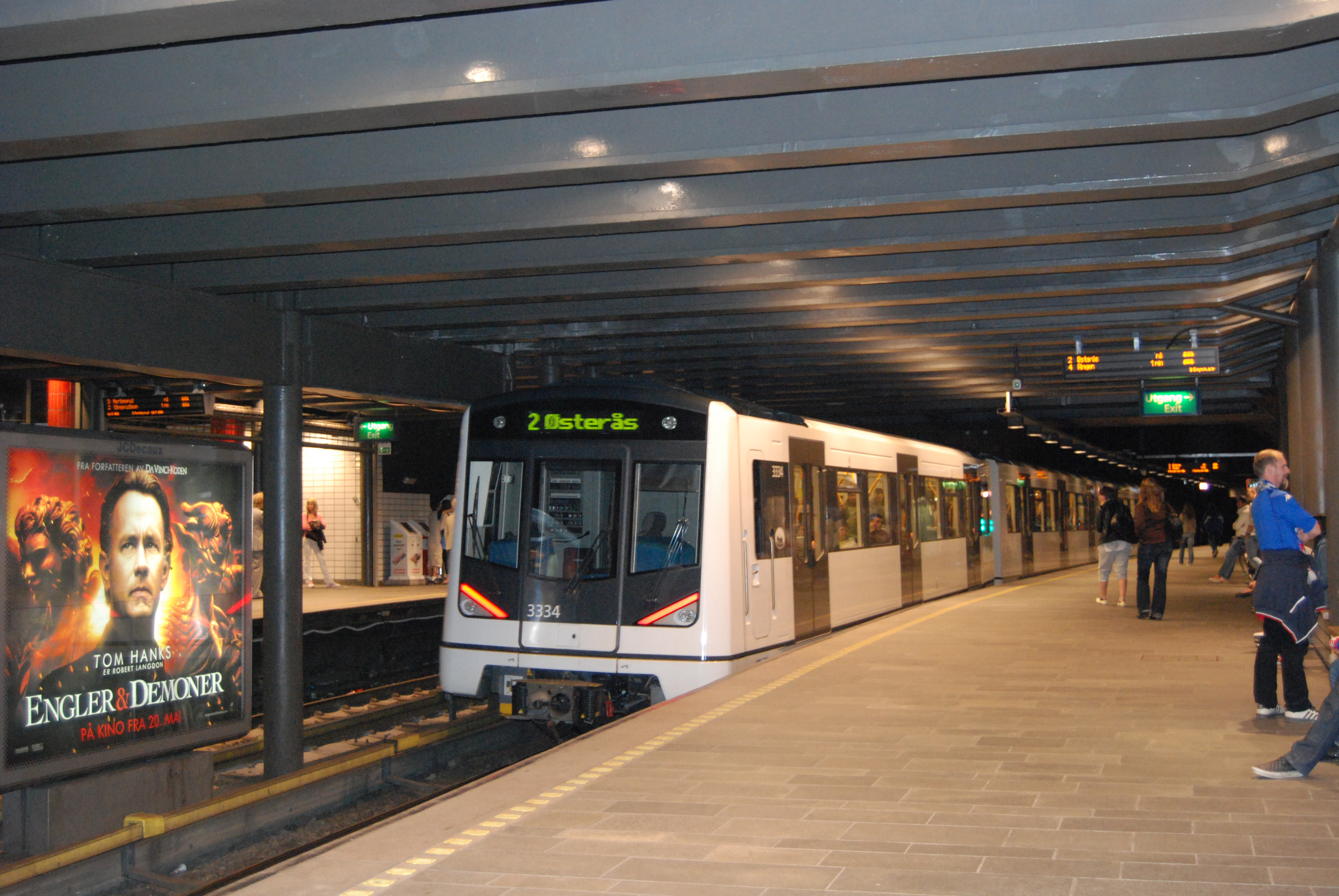
MX3000 train at Nationaltheatret

The line was officially opened by King Haakon VII on 27 June 1928. It became the first underground railway in the Nordic countries, five years before Stockholm and six years before Copenhagen. The tunnel was 1,620 meters (5,310 ft) long and trams used three to four minutes to run through it. It was used by two companies: Holmenkolbanen and Akersbanerne, with Holmenkolbanen operating both the Røa Line and the Holmenkollen Line. The Sognsvann Line was to be connected to the tunnel from 10 October 1934, and the two companies needed to find an agreement for paying for trackage rights. After negotiations failed, a decision was made by the Ministry of Labour on 7 July 1932, which stated that Akersbanerne would have to pay the additional fares collected for transport passengers through the tunnel, less the cost of running trains on the section.

On 16 May 1931, the Supreme Court found Holmenkolbanen guilty in the lawsuit regarding the real estate damage, with the compensation payments making the company insolvent. This resulted in Aker Municipality purchasing the majority of Holmenkolbanen, and merged the Røa Line and Sognsvann Line into the company. In 1939, Bærumsbanen started construction of a branch from the Lilleaker Line to Majorstuen. From 15 June 1942, the Kolsås Line, as it was renamed, started running via the tunnel to the city center. Bærumsbanen became part of Oslo Sporveier in 1971.

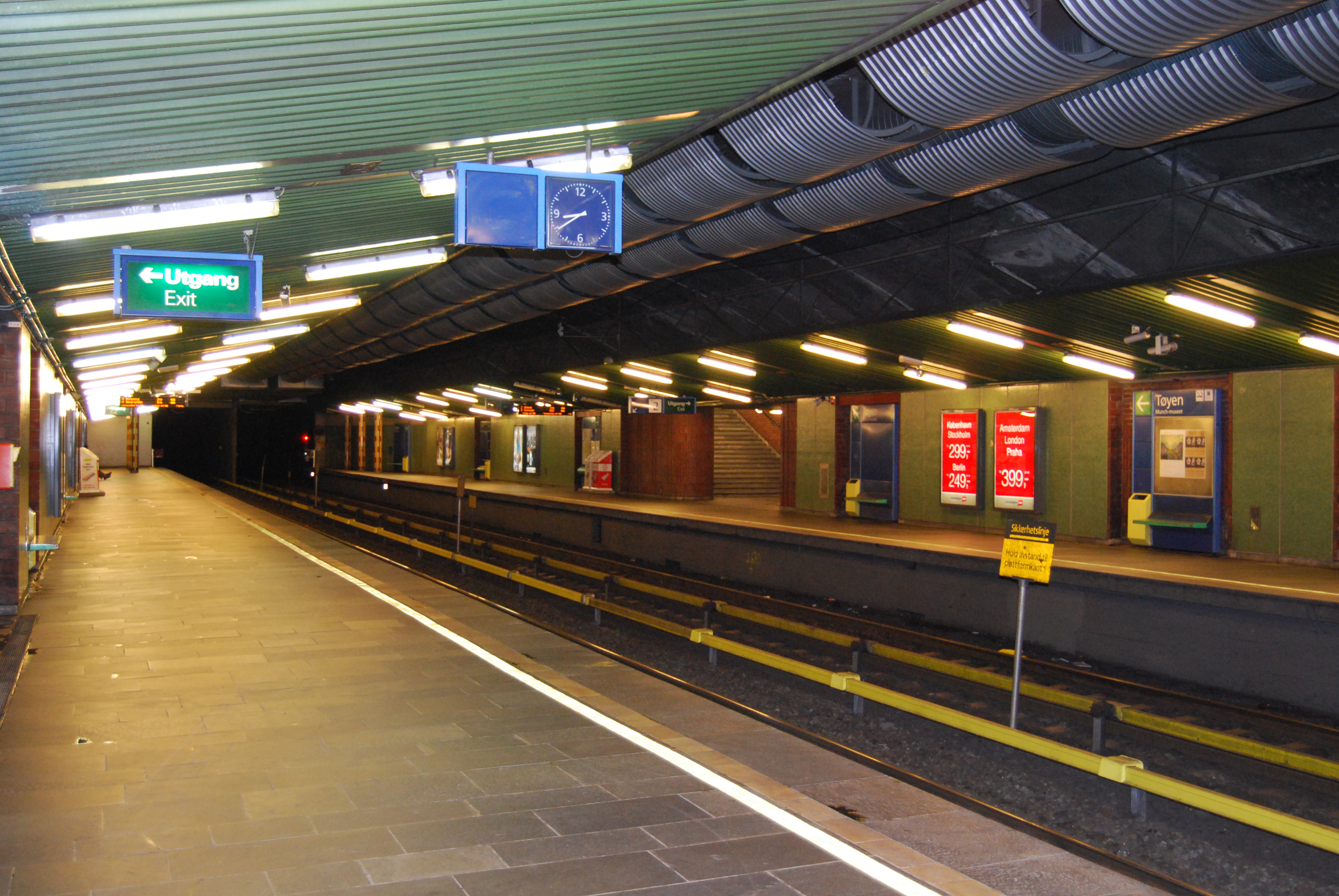
Tøyen

=== East end ===
In 1948, the Oslo and Aker were merged, and the new city government started planning suburban expansion, particularly in Groruddalen. On 15 September 1949, the Planning Office for the Suburban and Underground Lines was established as a division within the new municipality. The first specific plans were launched in March 1954, consisting of four branches which would connect to a common underground line from Tøyen to the city center. Originally the plans called for a terminus at Grønlands torg, with a later extension to Nationalhteatret included. However, it was quickly decided that the terminus instead should be at Jernbanetorget, next to Oslo East Station (today Oslo S).

The Lambertseter Line and the Østensjø Line existed as light rail lines, and were upgraded to metro standard. The Grorud Line and the Furuset Line were new and ran through previously undeveloped neighborhoods in Groruddalen. During construction, groundwork and electrical equipment was contracted to developers, while the trackage was done by the planning office. The original plans called for the use of 600 to 650 volt (V) direct current (DC) fed via a pantograph, to allow comparability with the light rail. This was later changed to 750 V DC via a third rail, allowing reduced maintenance costs and a larger contract surface, permitted a larger electric current and more power to the trains. The system also used cab signaling and moving blocks, which were cutting-edge technology at the time, and had previously only been implemented on the Stockholm Metro in Europe. The minimum allowed distance between trains was set to 90 seconds on the common section and 120 seconds on the branch lines. The tunnel, along with the upgraded Lambertseter Line, opened on 23 May 1966. The Grorud Line was connected on 16 October 1966, the Østensjø Line on 29 October 1967, and the Furuset Line on 18 November 1970.

=== The gap ===
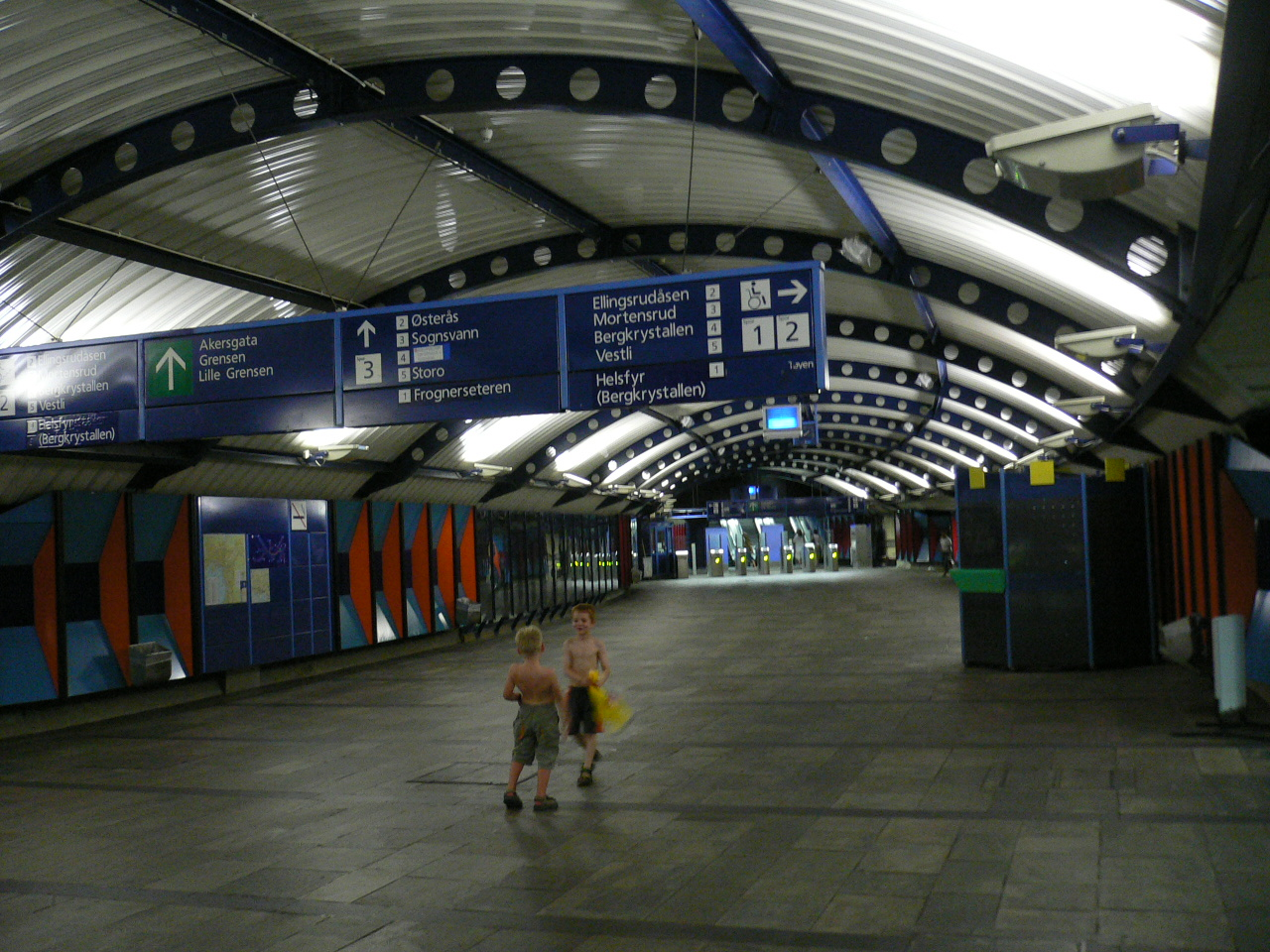
Stortinget

During the 1960s, the Drammen Line was being planned to connect to Oslo East Station through the proposed Oslo Tunnel. This would make Oslo West Station unnecessary, and would allow a central station to be built at the location of the East Station. The railway tunnel was planned with an intermediate railway station at Nationaltheatret. Simultaneously, Oslo Sporveier worked on possibilities to connect their eastern and western networks, and extend both to the city core. During the 1960s, the planning office for the metro proposed a tunnel between Nationaltheatret and Jernbanetorget, which would run parallel to the Oslo Tunnel. The initial plans called for a station at Slottsparken, close to Nationaltheatret, which would serve as the transfer point between the metro and the western light rail. This station was designed to handle 25,000 people per day.

At the time, the western and eastern networks were incompatible; in addition to different platform heights, the eastern network used six-car trains with a third-rail power supply, while the western network used overhead wires and two-car trains. The initial plans were met with criticism, following the media's discovery that the main planners had not consulted several hired specialists, and that alternatives to the preferred route had not been considered. As a consequence, several engineers working for NSB made two alternative suggestions for the route. By 1975, the plans were changed so that Nationaltheatret would become the transfer station, by building a balloon loop for the metro, while allowing the western trains to terminate as before. This solution would allow the two networks to be connected later.

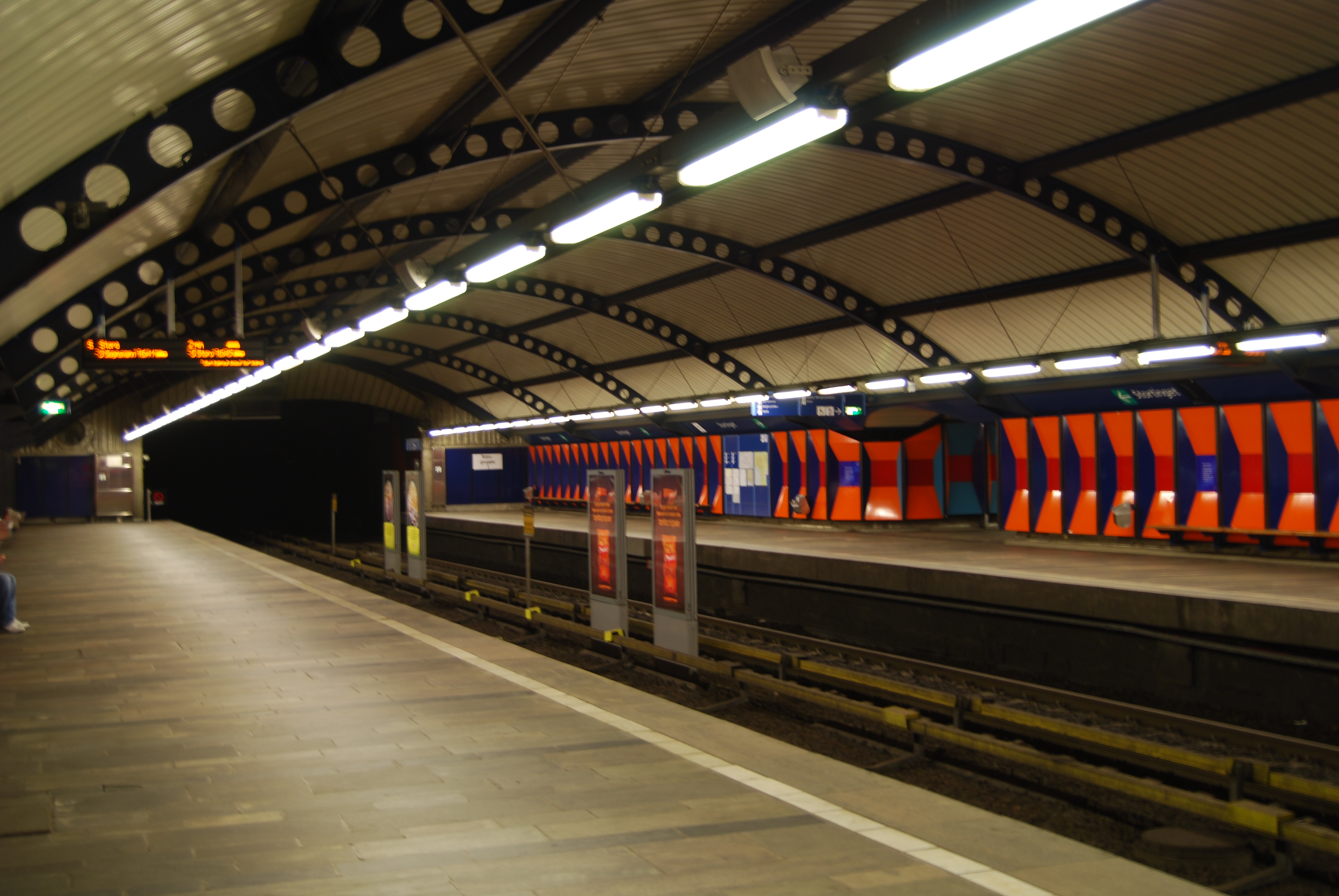
Stortinget

The decision to build Sentrum Station, located 700 meters (2,300 ft) west of Jernbanetorget, was taken by the city council on 22 May 1969. The decision also involved the transfer station being placed at Slottsparken/Nationaltheatret. Construction of Sentrum started in 1972, and was immediately followed by the first water leaks being discovered. By the time the station opened on 9 January 1977, there were still no adequate countermeasures for the leaks. During trials in January, it was discovered that the tracks were too low to allow all types of trains to open their doors, resulting in the tracks having to be raised. In 1978, the city planner discarded the proposal by Oslo Sporveier to build a new station at Slottsparken, and instead decided that Sentrum would become the interchange between the two systems. This would allow the western network to be upgraded to metro standard at a later date, and subsequently also allow metro trains to run through the center. The proposal was supported by all political parties except the Labour Party.

By 1978, the contractor and the municipality felt that the leaks were under control, and the municipality took over the station. On 20 February 1983, the station was closed for renovation to remove the leaks. At the time, it was expected that the station could reopen in 1984. The cause of the leaks was a combination of the wrong type of concrete being used and the wrong construction method. These were specified correctly in the tender contracts, but after the contractor was chosen, an agreement was made between the municipality and Selmer for the use of the membrane method. Combined with the inferior quality of concrete, the leaks were unavoidable. In 1986, the municipality sued Selmer for the NOK 158 million it cost to repair the station.

The station reopened on 7 March 1987, and took the name Stortinget, which derives from the Parliament of Norway Building (Norwegian: Stortinget), which is adjacent to the station. Trains from the western network terminated at the old platforms, where the metro had previously terminated. The metro trains instead ran through a balloon loop. The station featured a 40-meter (130 ft) step-free walk between the two systems. With the opening of Stortinget, the metro network was declared finished, after the last extension on the Furuset Line to Ellingsrudåsen had been made in 1981.

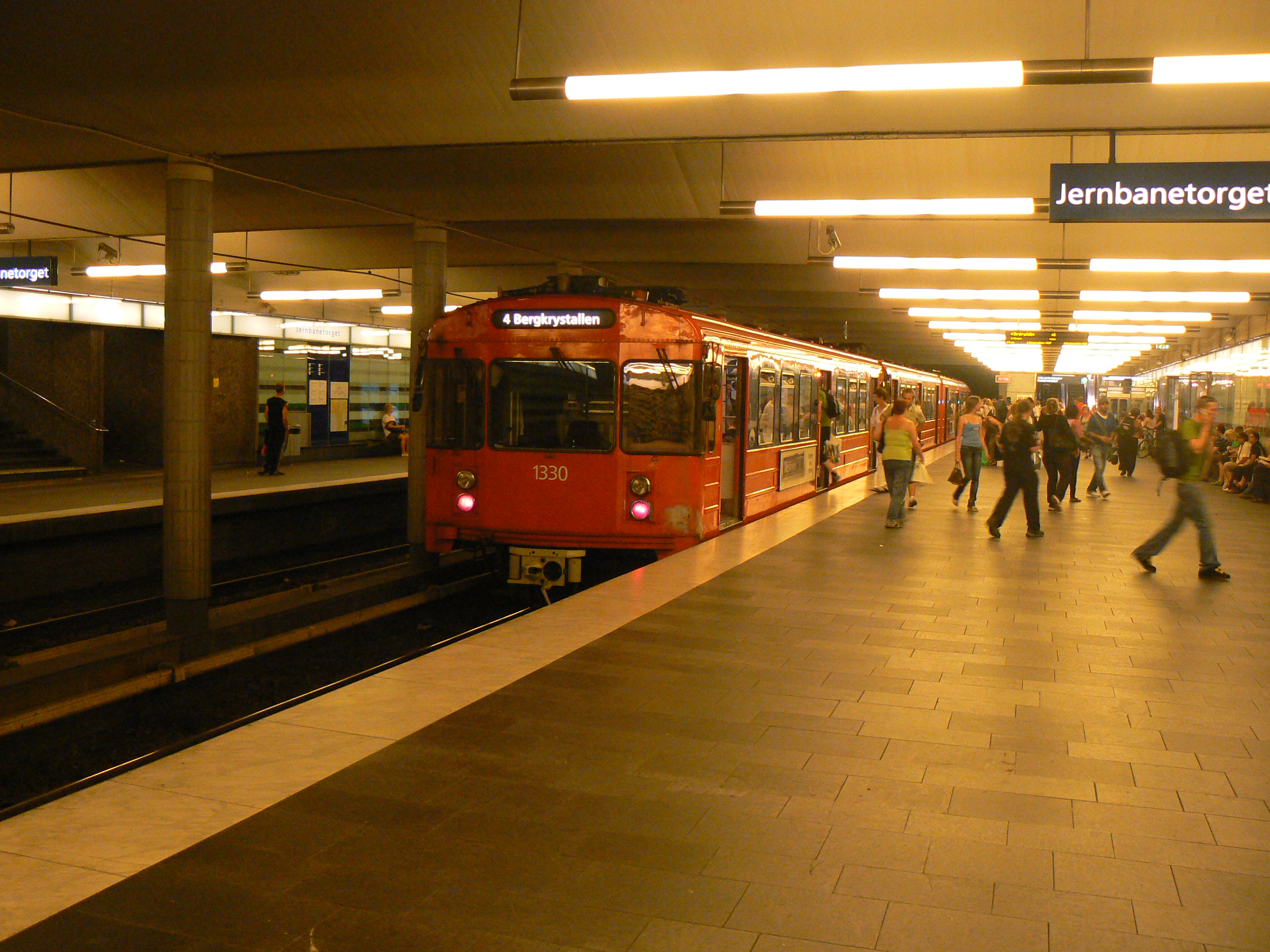
Jernbanetorget in 2008 with a T1300, a class that has since been retired

On 7 October 1987, the city council decided to connect the four light rails west of the city center with the metro, allowing through trains. The Sognsvann Line was selected as the first line to be upgraded. The overhead wires were replaced with a third-rail power supply, automatic train protection was installed, platforms were built long enough to accommodate six-car trains instead of two-car trains, and the platform height was increased. The upgrade also included the installation of third-rail power supply from Majorstuen to Stortinget. From 10 January 1993, the Sognsvann Line re-opened, and from 4 April, the line started operating through the Common Tunnel and connecting to the Lambertseter Line. The new service used T1000 rolling stock.

== Future ==
Oslo Package 3 is a political agreement between local and national politicians whereby state and municipal grants are combined with revenue from the toll ring to finance NOK 58 billion worth of transport infrastructure investments between 2008 and 2027. Ruter has requested NOK 100 million to upgrade the tunnel between Nationaltheatret and Majorstuen, where in some places there is only a few centimeters (about an inch) clearance between the tunnel wall and the trains. The upgrade would also include upgrades to the signaling system. Due to the narrow tunnel profile, evacuations from the trains have to be done from the ends of the trains.

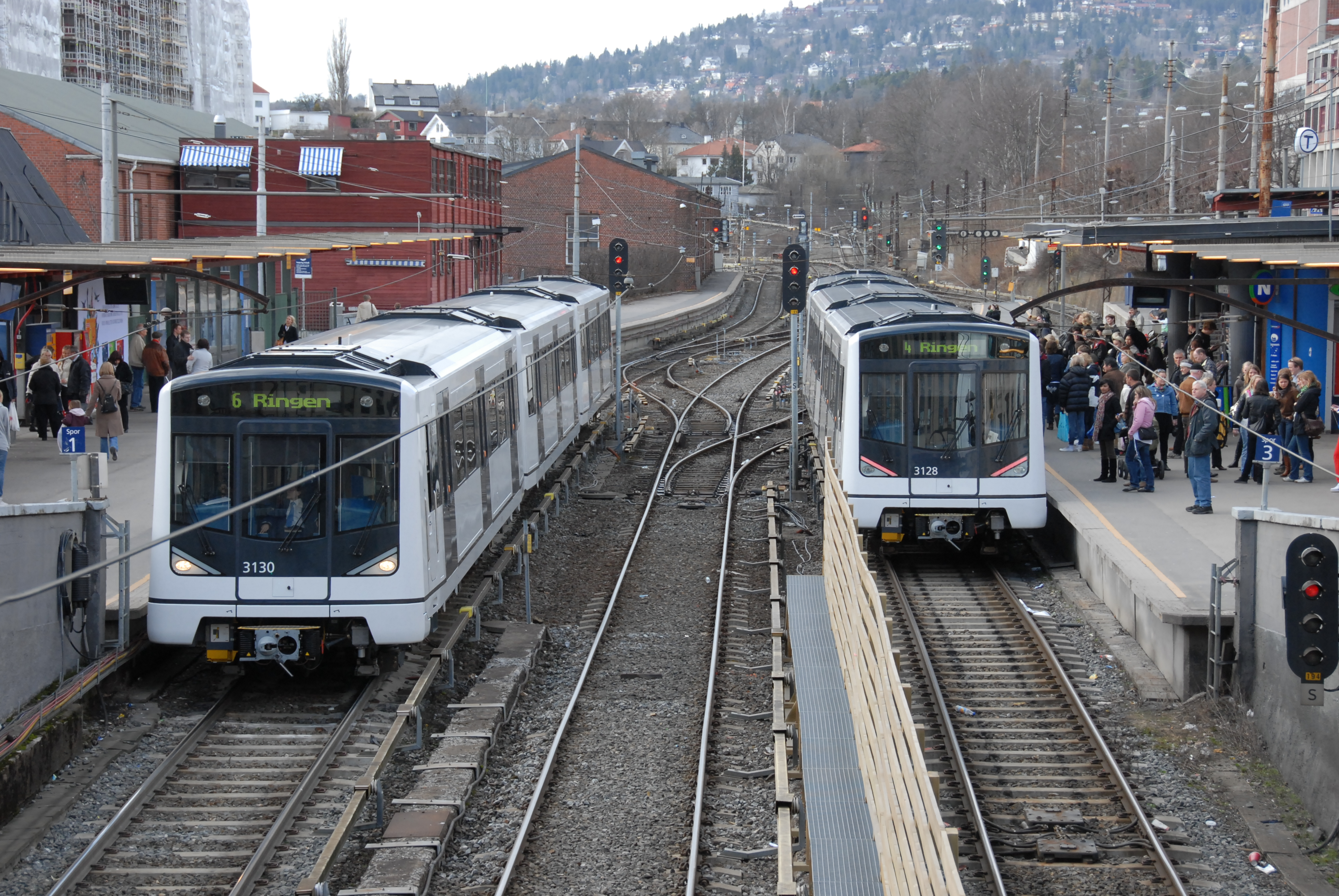
Two MX3000 trains at Majorstuen

Ruter has proposed building a new underground station at Majorstuen, which would be located closer to Valkyrie plass. The current station causes long transfer distances between the metro, tram and bus, in part because passengers have to cross Kirkeveien at street level. The proposed station would have an island platform, easing transfer between westbound lines, and allow access to both sides of Kirkeveien. The station is estimated to cost NOK 1.8 billion and would have six entrances.

NOK 700 million has been allocated to build a new station at Homansbyen, in the residential area of Frogner, roughly midway between Nationaltheatret and Majorstuen. The station is estimated to have 10,000 daily travelers, and funding is scheduled for the period 2014 to 2017. Ruter has stated that they are opposed to building the station, and have made any decision in their long-term plan from 2010 to 2030 regarding if the station should be built. The company has stated that the area has a good tram service, and is in no need of rapid transit. Because the station would be deep underground, travel time gains to the city center for local residents would be small, compared to using the tram. Also, all travelers taking the metro west of the city center would receive longer travel time, since all trains would have to stop at Homansbyen. Ruter is also concerned that a rapid transit station would take ridership away from the trams, which previously have been threatened with closure. The imminent planned upgrades to the section of the tunnel do not include any intermediate stations.

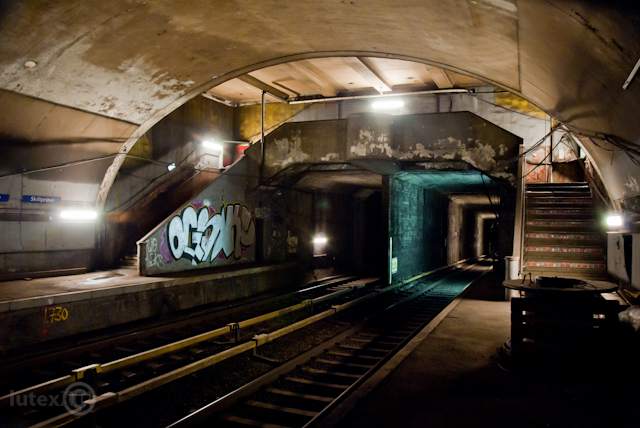
Valkyrie plass has become a ghost station

The tunnel remains the bottleneck of the metro. Without infrastructure upgrades, the only way to increase capacity through the tunnel is by running six-car trains on services currently run with three-car trains. It is also possible to increase the capacity through the tunnel to 32 trains per hour per direction by changing the signaling system and using driverless trains. In its long-term plans from 2009, Ruter stated that there is sufficient capacity in the tunnel until at least 2030. However, by 2011, the agency's plans stated that the capacity limit could be reached as early as or even before 2025. Any further increase in capacity would only be possible by building a second tunnel through the city center. The first plans called for a tunnel further north, roughly halfway between the Common Tunnel and the Ring Line, possibly in addition to a new tunnel through the city center.

Plans from 2011 have called for a new tunnel which runs from Majorstuen via Stortinget to Tøyen, but following a different route and with intermediate stations at Bislett, Hammersborg and Olaf Ryes plass, in the St. Hanshaugen and Grünerløkka boroughs north of the city center. Three of the lines would thus follow the existing tunnel to Stortinget and then switch to the new line, while the other three lines would follow the new tunnel to Stortinget and then run along the old tunnel onwards. This would allow for a six-minute headway on all but two branches, and also allow the proposed Fornebu Line to Skøyen, Fornebu and Nesodden to be built as part of the metro. Ruter has stated that the current stations are located in the areas which the most people want to travel to, and that if a second tunnel should deviate from these areas, they would have to serve places which generate as much traffic as the current stations.

Ruter has stated that the estimated investment cost would be NOK 10 billion, but that the tunnel would give high utility and would be one of the most economic investments they could make. There is no funding for a new tunnel in Oslo Package 3. By 2010, it was discovered that Oslo Package 3 was under-financed, and it is uncertain how much of the investment will be made by 2027. With the new tunnel being made a high priority by the city planners, this will either require additional grants from the municipality or the state, an increase in the toll fees, or the delay of investments in the program to a future Oslo Package 4. The left-wing parties have stated that they are willing to delay or abandon several road projects to allocate financing to a new tunnel, while the right-wing parties have stated that they are not willing to allow road projects to be undermined.
