= Asylet =

Building in Oslo, Norway

Coordinates: 59°54′46.40″N 10°45′44.52″E

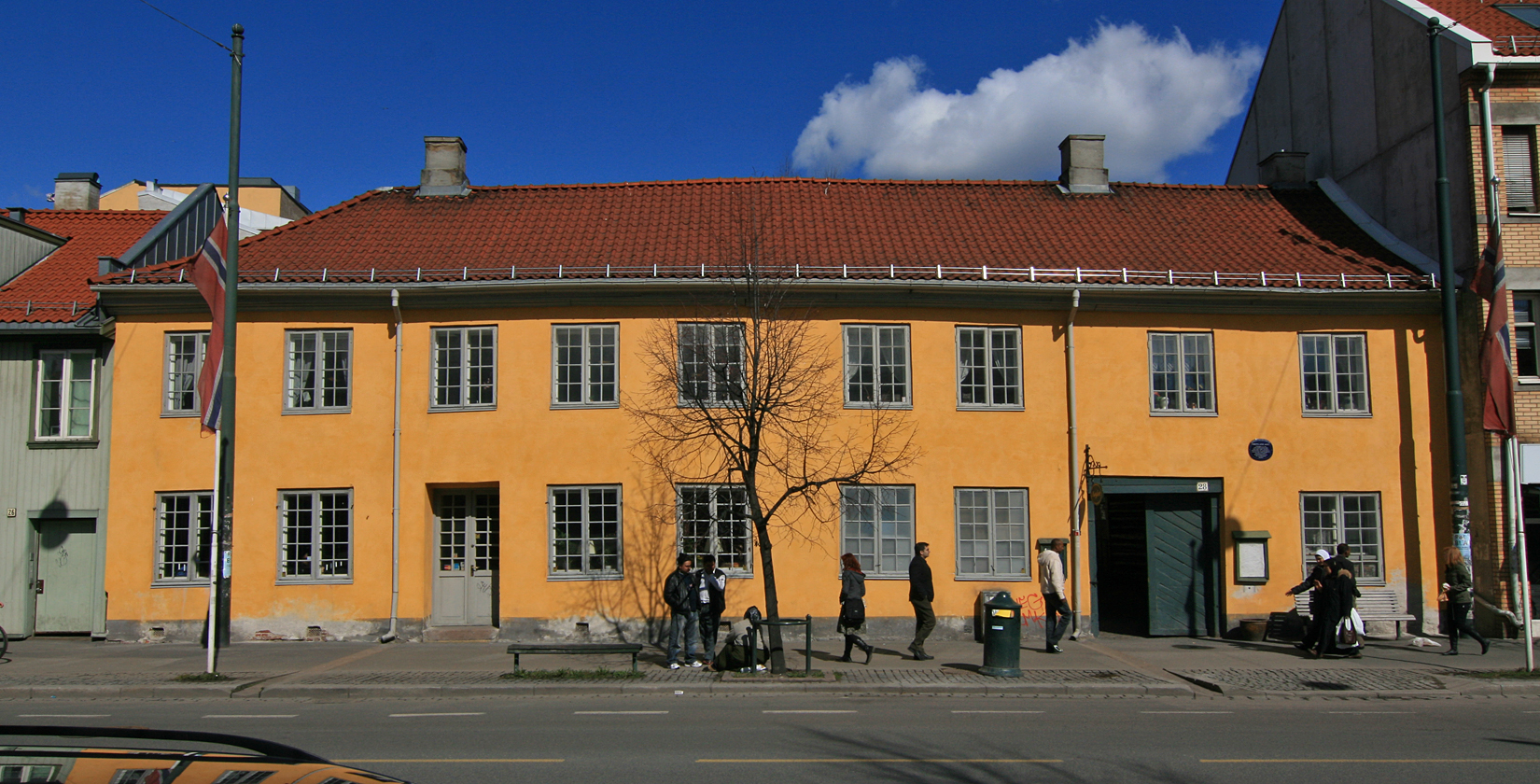
Asylet at Grønland, with the facade facing the street

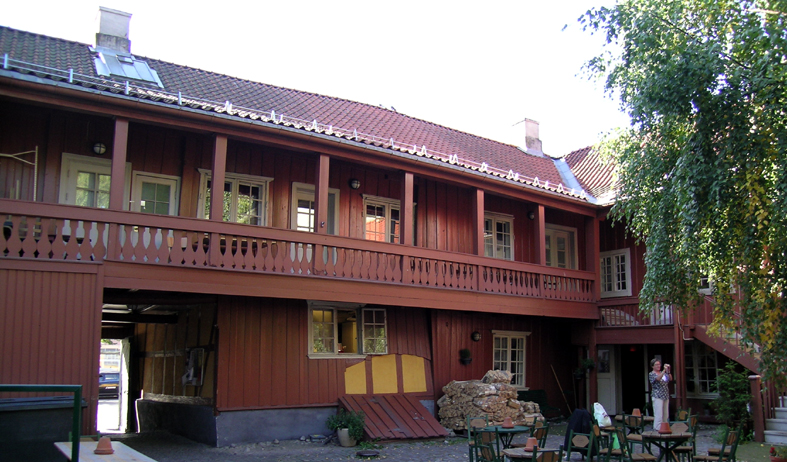
Asylet seen from the back

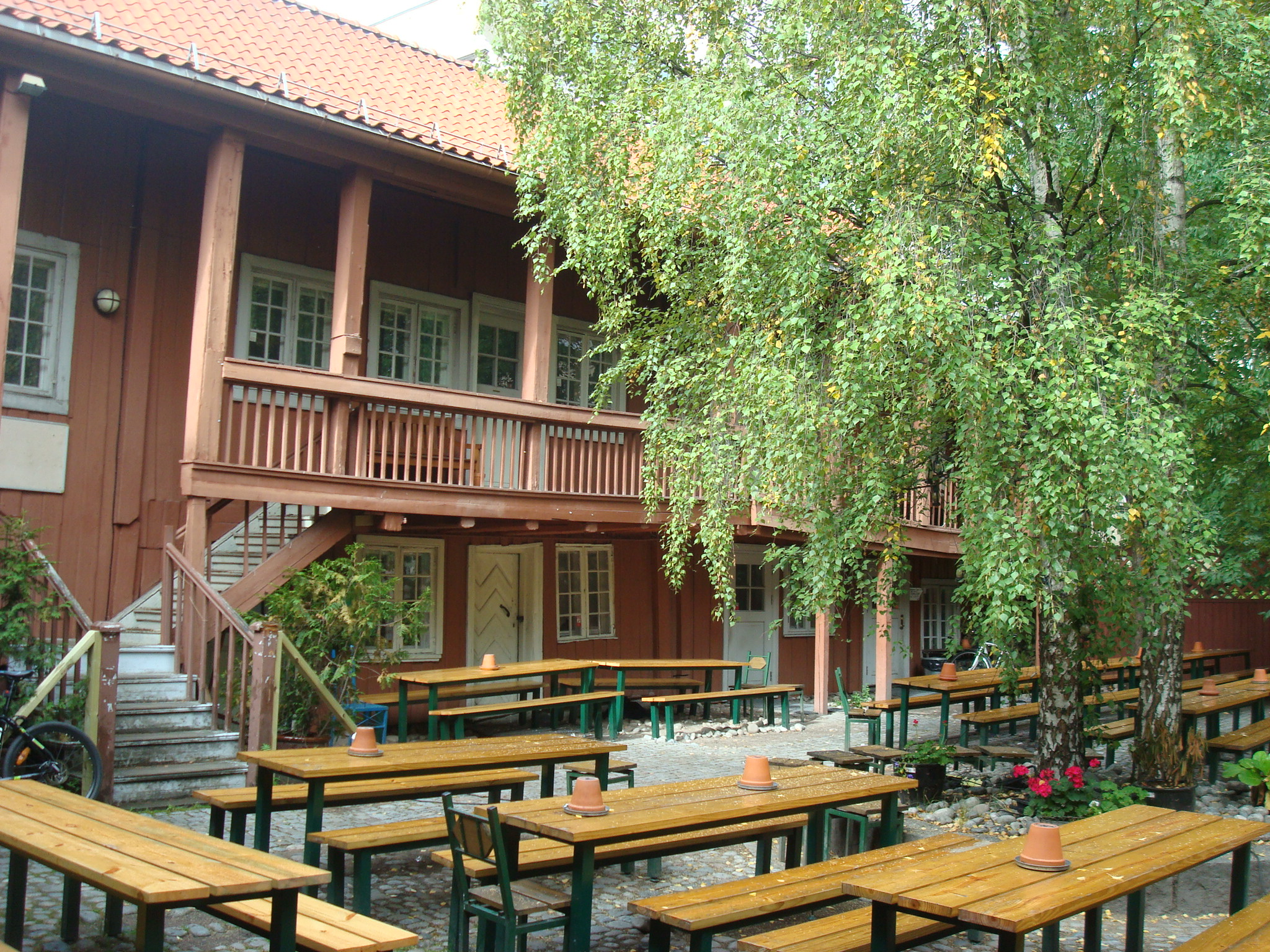
Asylet courtyard

Asylet is the popular name of a building located at Grønland 28 in Oslo, Norway.

== History ==
Asylet was built as a merchant yard around 1730 with an annex added in 1798. The two story building was constructed of notched timber, with half-timbered and modified brick-faced facade facing the street. Two perpendicular wings create a courtyard which is paved with small stones.

From 1839 to 1865, the house was used as a child's asylum, (hence the name, which means asylum in English). It has also served as a courthouse and bank division (Akers Sparebank 1844 and Spareskillingsbanken 1851).

From 1868 to 1903 it housed a facility operated by Krohgstøttens Hospital (Krohgstøttens sykehus). During the period 1903–1965, the building housed a nursing home. The building was conserved in 1967 and since 1992 has been the site of various offices and shops. Today, the building also houses Kafe Asylet, a café and restaurant with rental space and outdoor seating.
