= Vaterland =

Vaterland means "Fatherland" in German. It may also refer to:

- Vaterland, Norway, a neighborhood in Oslo
- The ocean liner SS Vaterland, later known as SS Leviathan
- Liechtensteiner Vaterland, largest daily newspaper in Liechtenstein
- Germany
- Das Vaterland, the Austrian Catholic newspaper founded by Leo von Thun-Hohenstein
