= Grønlands torg =

Square in Oslo, Norway

Coordinates: 59.9126°N 10.7616°E

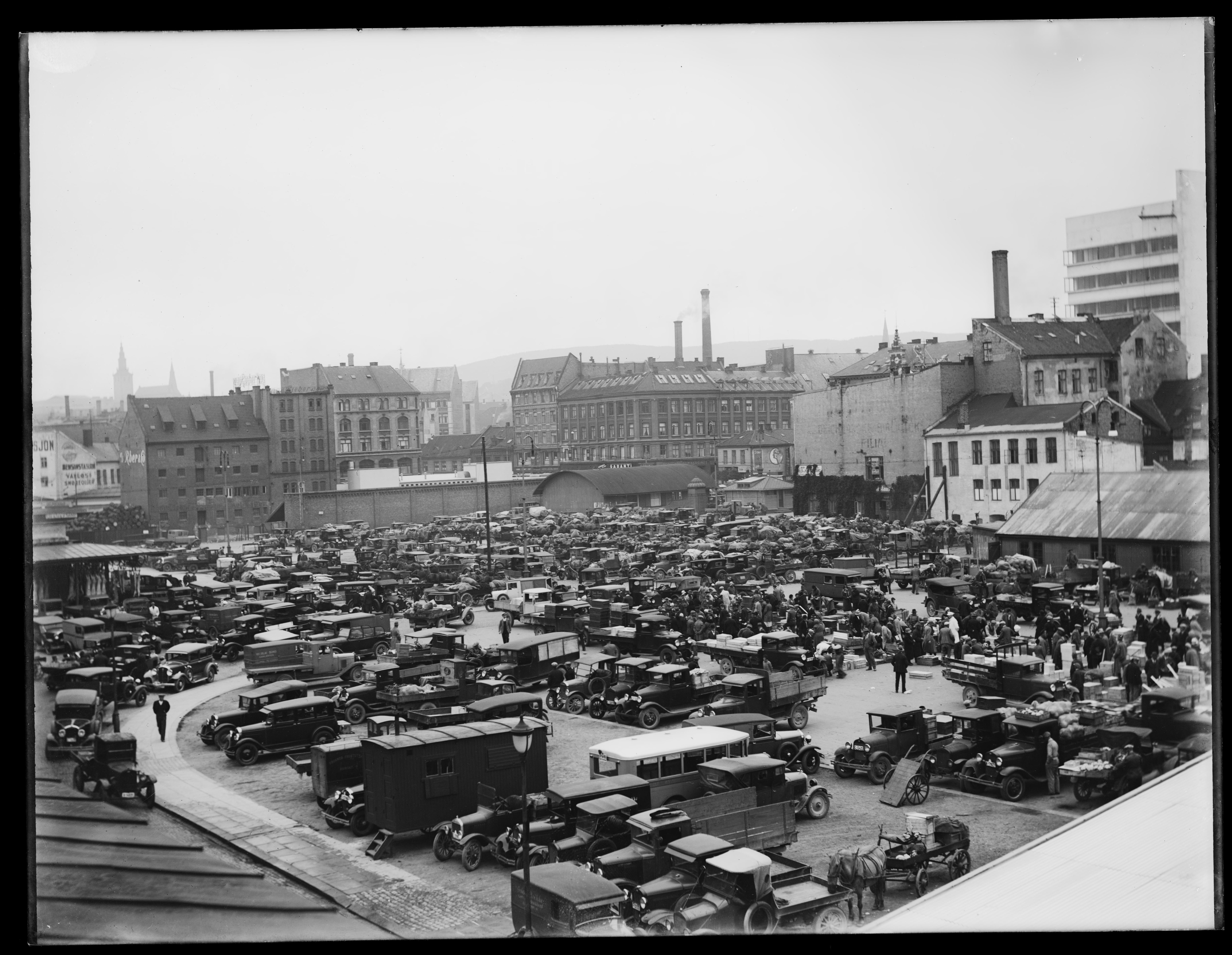
Oslo, Norway

Grønlands torg is a square in Grønland, Oslo, Norway. It was previously the largest square in the city. It featured Slaktehuset, Kjøtthallen and Gartnerhallen. The first two were demolished in 1974, while the latter burned down the same year. From the 1980s, it has received an urban renewal, with housing and commerce. It is served by Grønland of the Oslo Metro.
