= Helsfyr =

Neighborhood in Oslo, Norway

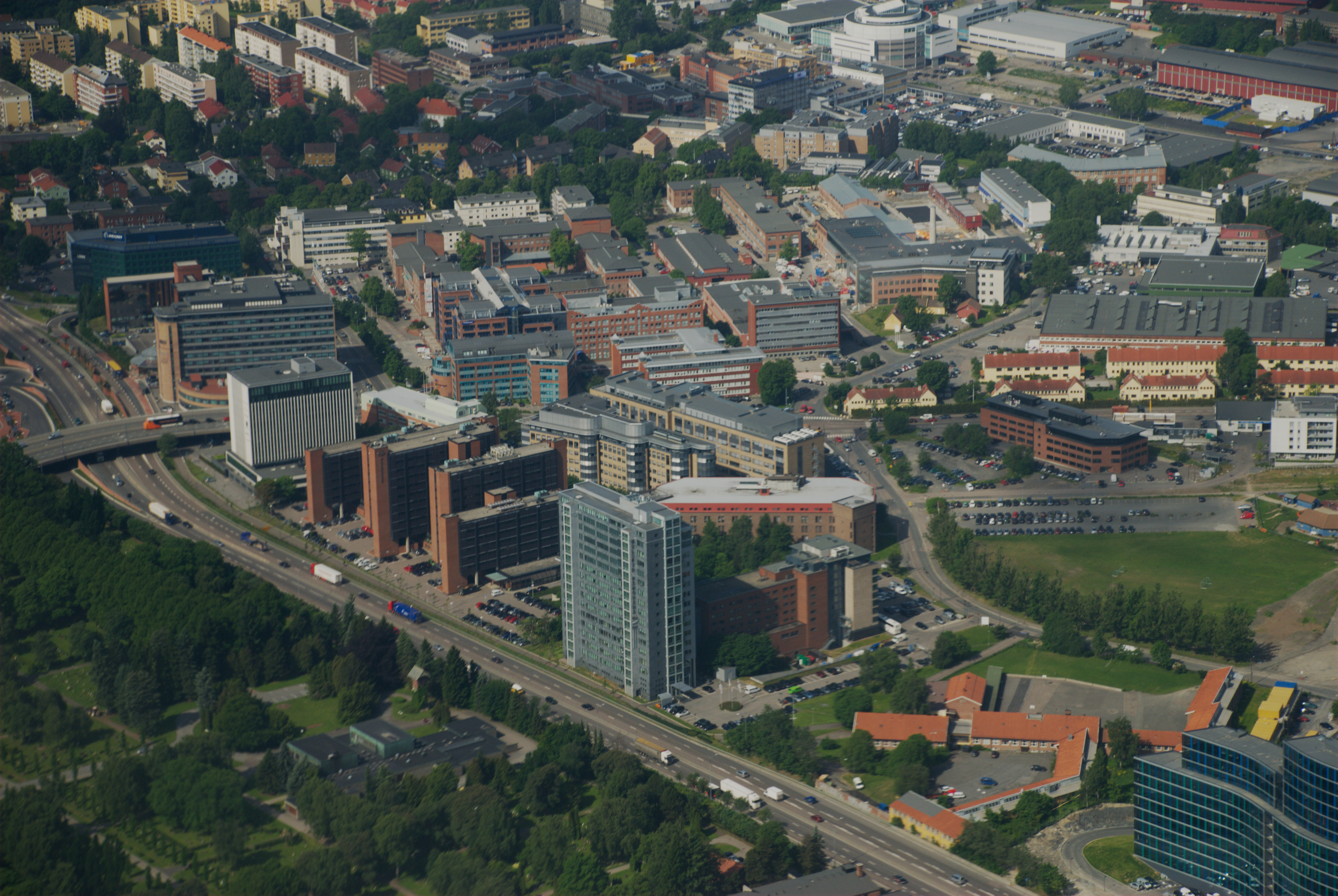
Helsfyr (2010)

Helsfyr is a residential and industrial neighborhood in Oslo. It is located in Oslo's East End, in the administrative borough of Gamle Oslo.

The neighborhood is named after Helsfyr gård, which name is possibly originating from Low Saxon helschvûr, "Hell-Fire". Helsfyr was sparsely populated until the 1950s, and was further developed in the 1980s.

The surrounding localities consist mostly of office buildings and also some industrial establishments. An ice rink and concert stadium are located nearby at Valle-Hovin. Just northeast of the station is the cemetery Østre Gravlund (Eastern Cemetery), which includes the Jewish Cemetery.

== Helsfyr station ==
Helsfyr
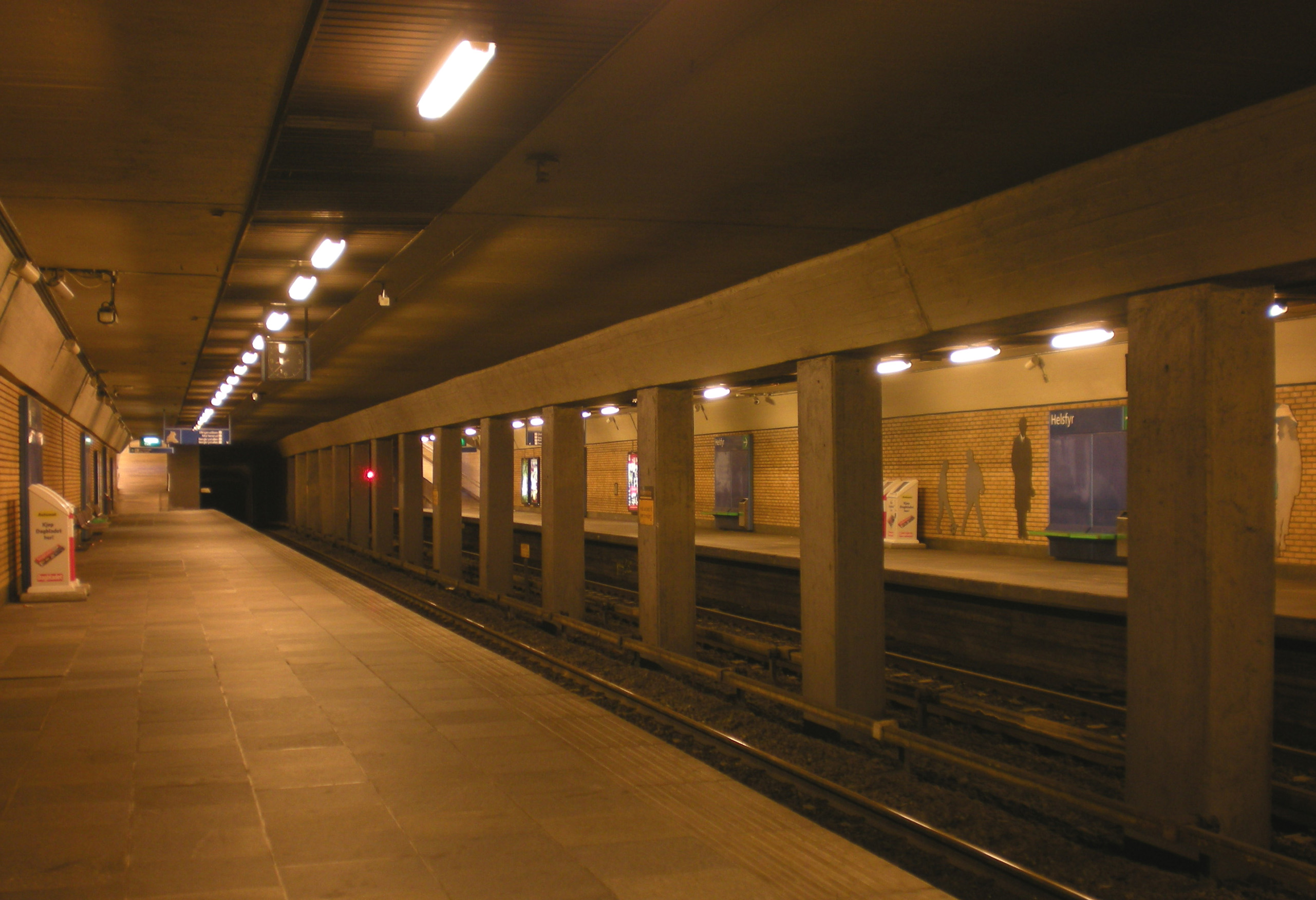

General information
- Location: Helsfyr, Oslo; Norway
- Coordinates: 59°54′46″N 10°48′03″E
- Elevation: 73.7 m (242 ft)
- Owner: Sporveien
- Operator: Sporveien T-banen
- Lines: Furuset Line; Østensjø Line; Lambertseter Line
- Distance: 3.8 km (2.4 mi) from Stortinget
- Connections: Bus: 20 Skøyen (night only); 21 Tjuvholmen; 37 Nydalen T 66 Grorud T via IKEA; 68 Grorud T 76 Mortensrud; 100 Oslo Bus Terminal – Kjeller; 110 Oslo Bus Terminal – Lillestrøm; 110E Sørlihavna; 115E Vallerudtoppen; 125E Nesåsen; 300 Oslo Bus Terminal – Blystadlia; 300E Blystadlia; 375 Strømmen; 400 Oslo Bus Terminal – Veståsen skole – Oslo Airport; 400E Eltonåsen; 470E Bjørkelangen; 480E Bjørkelangen via Loren; 490E Trøgstad; FB5 Hotel Scandinavian – Oslo Airport; VY123 Oslo Bus Terminal – Elverum

Construction
- Structure type: Underground
- Accessible: Yes

History
- Opened: 22 May 1966; 60 years ago
Location

Helsfyr station on the Oslo Metro first opened in 1966. The station is shared by the Furuset Line (Line 2), the Østensjø Line (Line 3) and the Lambertseter Line (Lines 1 and 4). Line 1 terminates at Helsfyr during weekends, late evenings, and vacations. The station is located between Ensjø in the west and Brynseng in the east. A combined metro/bus terminal opened in 1993, making Helsfyr an important public transportation interchange in Oslo's East End. The station is located underground. The entrance to the station is located within the perimeter of a bus terminal.

Preceding station	Oslo Metro	Following station
Ensjø towards Frognerseteren	Line 1	Brynseng towards Bergkrystallen
Ensjø towards Østerås	Line 2	Brynseng towards Ellingsrudåsen
Ensjø towards Kolsås	Line 3	Brynseng towards Mortensrud
Ensjø towards Vestli	Line 4	Brynseng towards Bergkrystallen
