= Ensjø (station) =

Oslo metro station

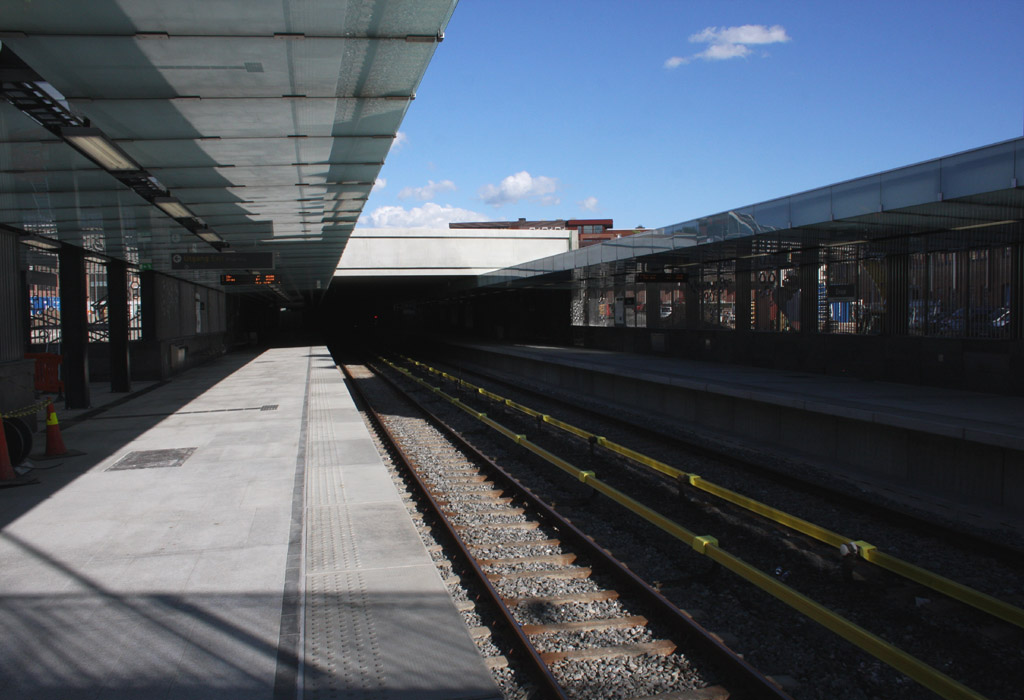

General information
- Location: Helsfyr, Oslo; Norway
- Coordinates: 59°54′48″N 10°47′17″E
- Owner: Sporveien
- Operator: Sporveien T-banen
- Lines: Furuset Line; Østensjø Line; Lambertseter Line
- Distance: 3.0 km (1.9 mi) from Stortinget

Construction
- Structure type: At-grade
- Accessible: Yes

History
- Opened: 22 May 1966; 60 years ago
- Rebuilt: 2012–2013
Location

Ensjø is a station on the Oslo Metro located in the borough of Helsfyr. The station is shared by the Østensjø-, Lambertseter- and Furuset Line. It is the first station on the east side after emerging from the downtown Common Tunnel for these lines. The station is located between Tøyen and Helsfyr. Ensjø is mostly a commercial area, with many car dealerships. The station also serves Jordal Amfi, home arena of Vålerenga Ishockey.

Preceding station	Oslo Metro	Following station
Tøyen towards Frognerseteren	Line 1	Helsfyr towards Bergkrystallen
Tøyen towards Østerås	Line 2	Helsfyr towards Ellingsrudåsen
Tøyen towards Kolsås	Line 3	Helsfyr towards Mortensrud
Tøyen towards Vestli	Line 4	Helsfyr towards Bergkrystallen
