= Tøyen metro station =

Oslo metro station

Tøyen
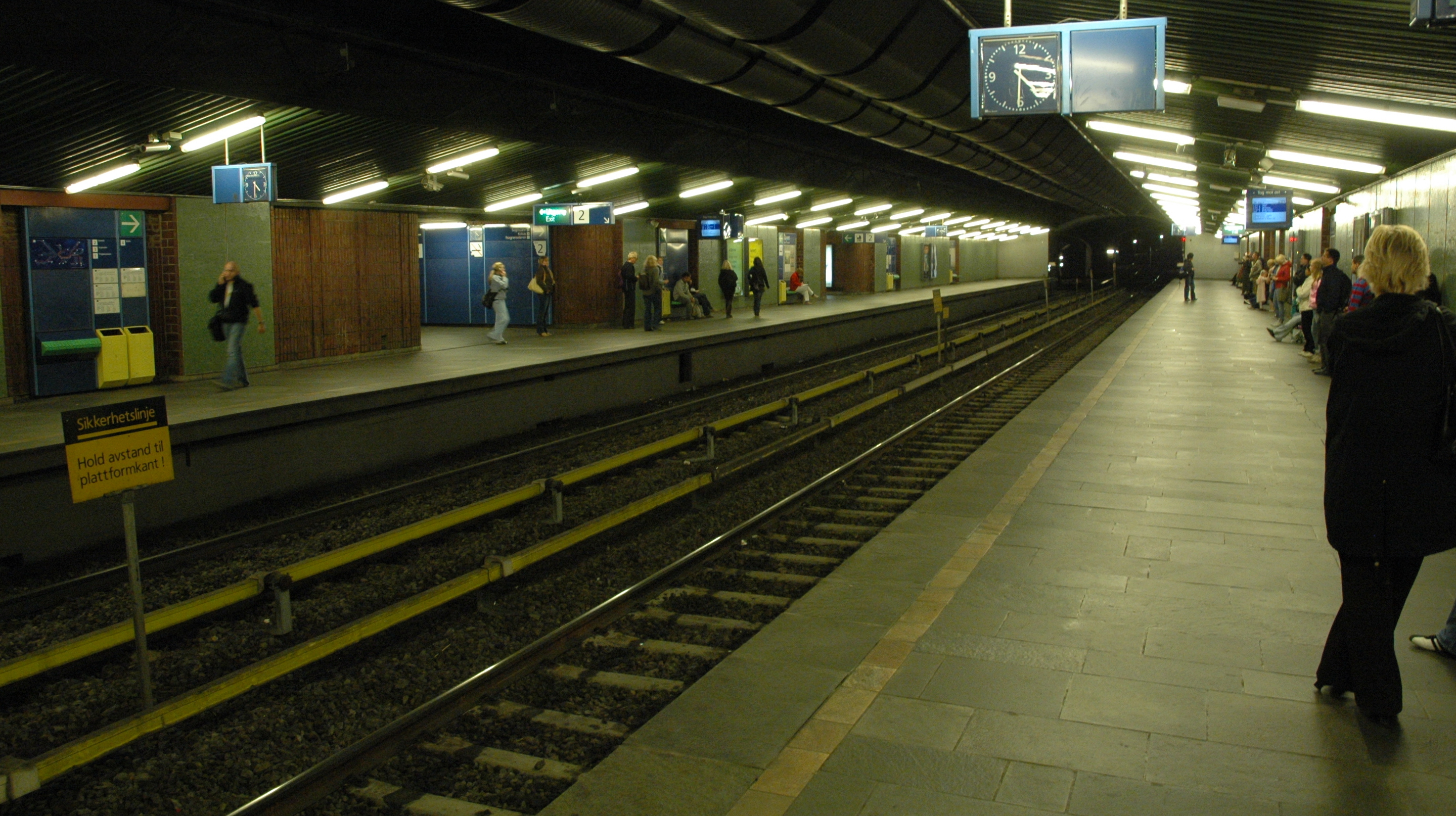
- Station photograph taken from platform for outbound trains

General information
- Location: Tøyen, Oslo; Norway
- Coordinates: 59°54′54″N 10°46′34″E
- Elevation: 22.2 m (73 ft)
- Owner: Sporveien
- Operator: Sporveien T-banen
- Line: Common Tunnel
- Distance: 2.1 km from Stortinget
- Connections: Bus: 20 Skøyen - Galgeberg; 60 Vippetangen - Tonsehagen

Construction
- Structure type: Underground
- Accessible: Yes

History
- Opened: 1966; 60 years ago
Location

Tøyen is a rapid transit station located in the Common Tunnel of Oslo Metro in Norway. Located in the borough of Gamle Oslo, it was also called "Tøyen-Munchmuseet" due to its proximity to the former art museum. The sign on platform 4 formerly said Munchmuseet underneath the station name, but it has been covered over with blue tape. It is the last station on the east side shared by all lines; the Grorud Line and Ring Line departs from the other four lines at Tøyen. The station has three platforms, on the south side is a platform for all outbound trains. Across the tracks is another for inbound trains coming from Ensjø, and on the other side of this platform is a third one for inbound trains from Carl Berners plass.

The station was opened on 22 May 1966 as part of the new metro lines to the eastern boroughs of Oslo. Above the metro station is a shopping centre. The Munch Museum was formerly found here but it was relocated to Bjørvika, a few years ago. There is also a park north of the subway station with botanical gardens and paleontological, geological and zoological museums.

There is also a railway station, Tøyen Station, that is located on the Gjøvik Line, though this station is located 750 metres (2,460 ft) from the metro station.

Preceding station	Oslo Metro	Following station
Grønland towards Frognerseteren	Line 1	Ensjø towards Bergkrystallen
Grønland towards Østerås	Line 2	Ensjø towards Ellingsrudåsen
Grønland towards Kolsås	Line 3	Ensjø towards Mortensrud
Grønland towards Vestli	Line 4	Ensjø towards Bergkrystallen
Grønland towards Sognsvann	Line 5	Carl Berners plass towards Vestli
