= Grønland station =

Oslo metro station

Grønland
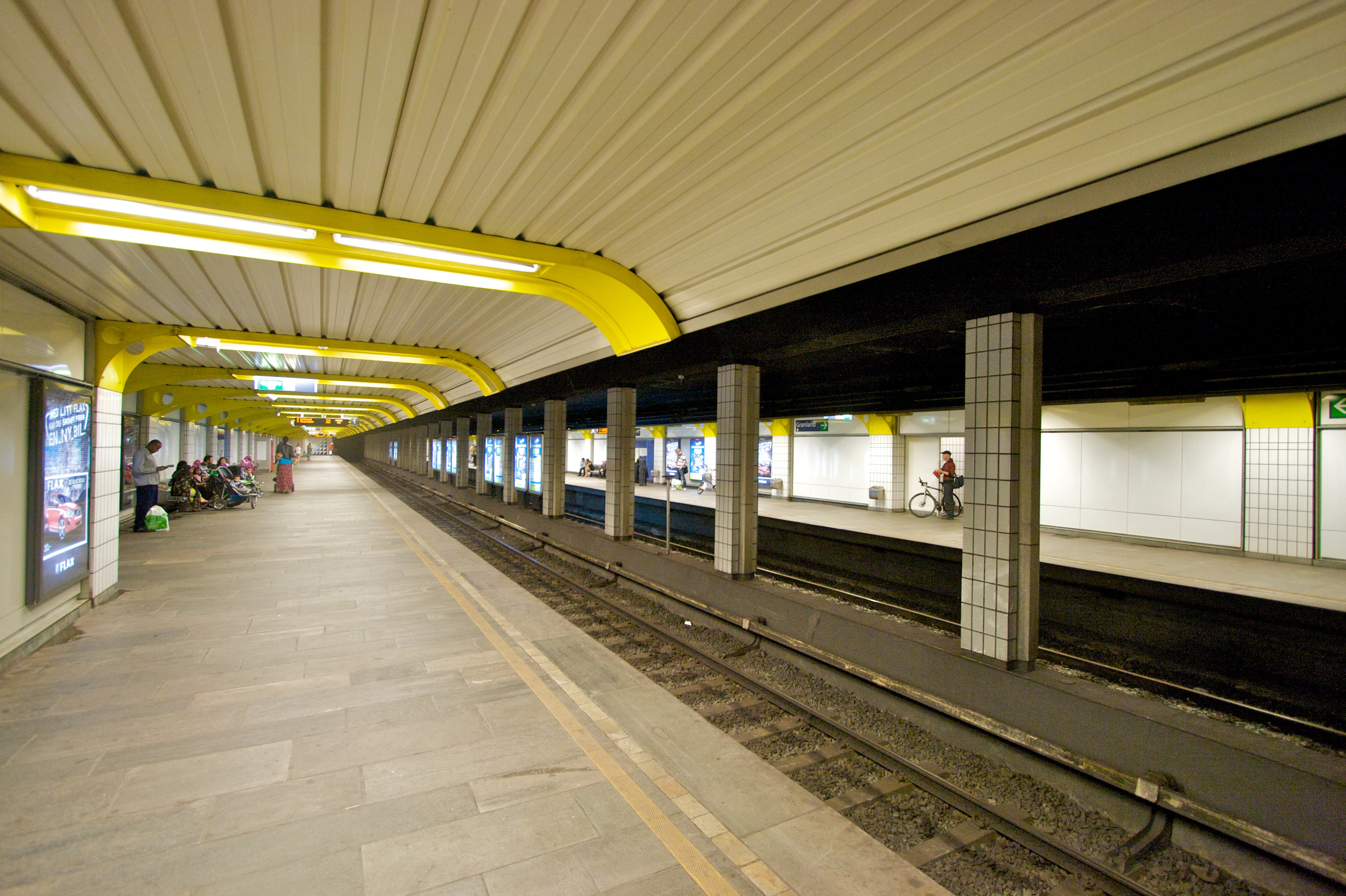

General information
- Location: Grønland, Oslo; Norway
- Coordinates: 59°54′47″N 10°45′29″E
- Elevation: −7 m (−23 ft)
- Owner: Sporveien
- Operator: Sporveien T-banen
- Line: Common Tunnel
- Distance: 1.0 km (0.6 mi) from Stortinget
- Connections: Oslo Bus Terminal

Construction
- Structure type: Underground
- Accessible: Yes

History
- Opened: 22 May 1966; 60 years ago
Location

Grønland is a rapid transit station on the Oslo Metro's Common Tunnel, serving all six lines. Situated in the Grønland business and residential area, it lies between Jernbanetorget to the west and Tøyen to the east. The station opened on May 22, 1966, with the subway's inauguration, and underwent refurbishments from 1988–92. Peer Qvam was the original architect.

Grønland has relatively low passenger volume compared to other Common Tunnel stations, which is likely due to the largely residential nature of the surrounding area, despite its proximity to the city center. Adjacent to the ticket hall is a small underground shopping center, with more shops available on the surface level. Although there are no direct connections to other modes of public transportation at Grønland station, the central coach station and a tram stop are located within a short walking distance.

The subway schedule suggests Grønland as a transfer point between lines, citing its less crowded platforms compared to neighboring stations. The platform walls feature white tiling, making it one of the system's brightest stations.

== History ==
In 1987, work was undertaken to fix leaks caused by cracks in the bedrock that allowed surface water to seep into the station. A clogging chemical was sprayed into the rocks to remedy this. A major renovation commenced on February 1, 1989, encompassing the entrance, passenger hallways, and platform area. This involved replacing flammable materials with non-flammable alternatives, such as exchanging vinyl siding for tiles, enhancing the station's brightness, and installing artwork by Terje Roalkvam. The reopening occurred in November 1989, after an investment of 11 million Norwegian kroner (NOK). The renovations were completed with only one day of closure to travelers.

To mitigate noise pollution affecting the reception of the newly opened Oslo Plaza hotel, the metro installed a 2.4-centimeter (0.94 in) rubber mat under the track and ballast between Grønland and Stortinget in February 1990. After several years of closure, the public toilet at Grønland reopened in May 1990. This was achieved through privatization, where a private enterprise was permitted to sell flowers and collect user fees to cover operating expenses. On October 11, 1998, a bridge providing direct access to Oslo Bus Terminal was opened at a cost of NOK 6 million.

== Service ==
As part of the Common Tunnel, the station is served by all six lines of the Oslo Metro. During regular hours, each line operates at a frequency of once or twice every 15 minutes, resulting in approximately 30 departures per hour in each direction. Service is less frequent during late evenings and Saturday and Sunday mornings. Travel time to Stortinget is 2 minutes, while travel times to the eastern terminal stations are 10 minutes to Nydalen, 25 minutes to Vestli, 21 minutes to Bergkrystallen, 23 minutes to Mortensrud and 21 minutes to Ellingsrudåsen.

Located within walking distance is the Oslo Bus Terminal, which provides regional and intercity coach services. Also nearby is the Bussterminalen Grønland stop on the Gamleby Line of the Oslo Tramway.

Preceding station	Oslo Metro	Following station
Jernbanetorget towards Frognerseteren	Line 1	Tøyen towards Bergkrystallen
Jernbanetorget towards Østerås	Line 2	Tøyen towards Ellingsrudåsen
Jernbanetorget towards Kolsås	Line 3	Tøyen towards Mortensrud
Jernbanetorget towards Vestli	Line 4	Tøyen towards Bergkrystallen
Jernbanetorget towards Sognsvann	Line 5	Tøyen towards Vestli
