= Vaterland, Norway =

Neighborhood in Oslo, Norway

Coordinates: 59°54′N 10°45′E

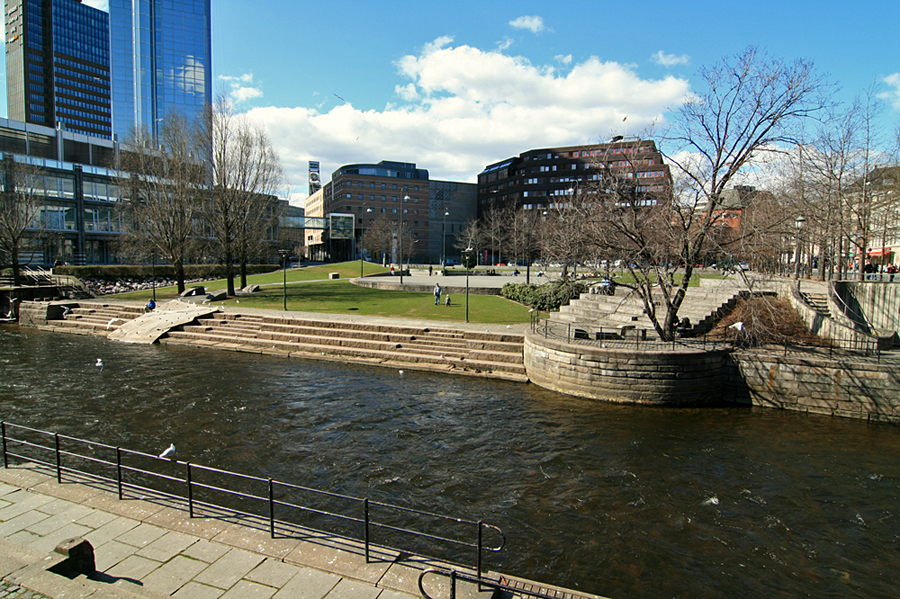
Vaterland Park with Oslo Plaza and Postgirbygget to the left and Akerselva in the foreground

Vaterland is a neighborhood in Oslo, Norway. It is located north of the tracks at Oslo Central Station, between Jernbanetorget, Storgata and Akerselva river. The area features Oslo Central Station and Oslo Bus Terminal, the shopping centers Oslo City and Byporten, Galleri Oslo, Radisson Blu Plaza Hotel, the concert arena Oslo Spektrum and Postgirobygget. Vaterland Park lies along the Aker River.

The name Vaterland was borrowed from Dutch Waterland 'wetland, waterland'.
