= Grønland, Oslo =

Grønland
- Neighbourhood
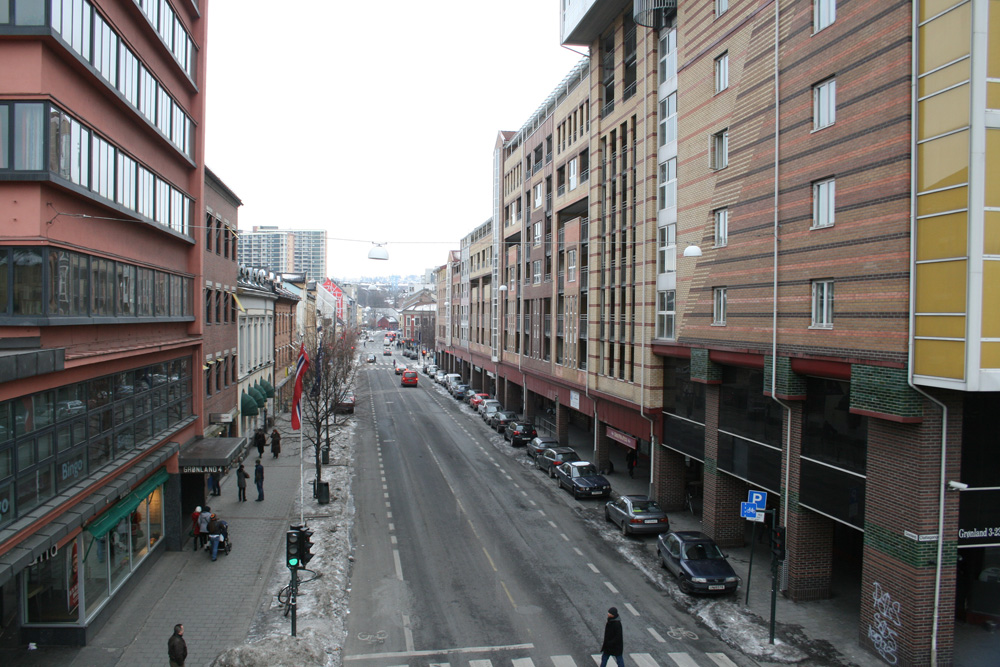
- Interactive map of Grønland
- Coordinates: 59°54′45″N 10°45′43″E
- Country: Norway
- County: Oslo
- Municipality: Oslo
- Borough of Oslo: Gamle Oslo
- Time zone: UTC+1 (CET)
  - Summer (DST): UTC+2 (CEST)

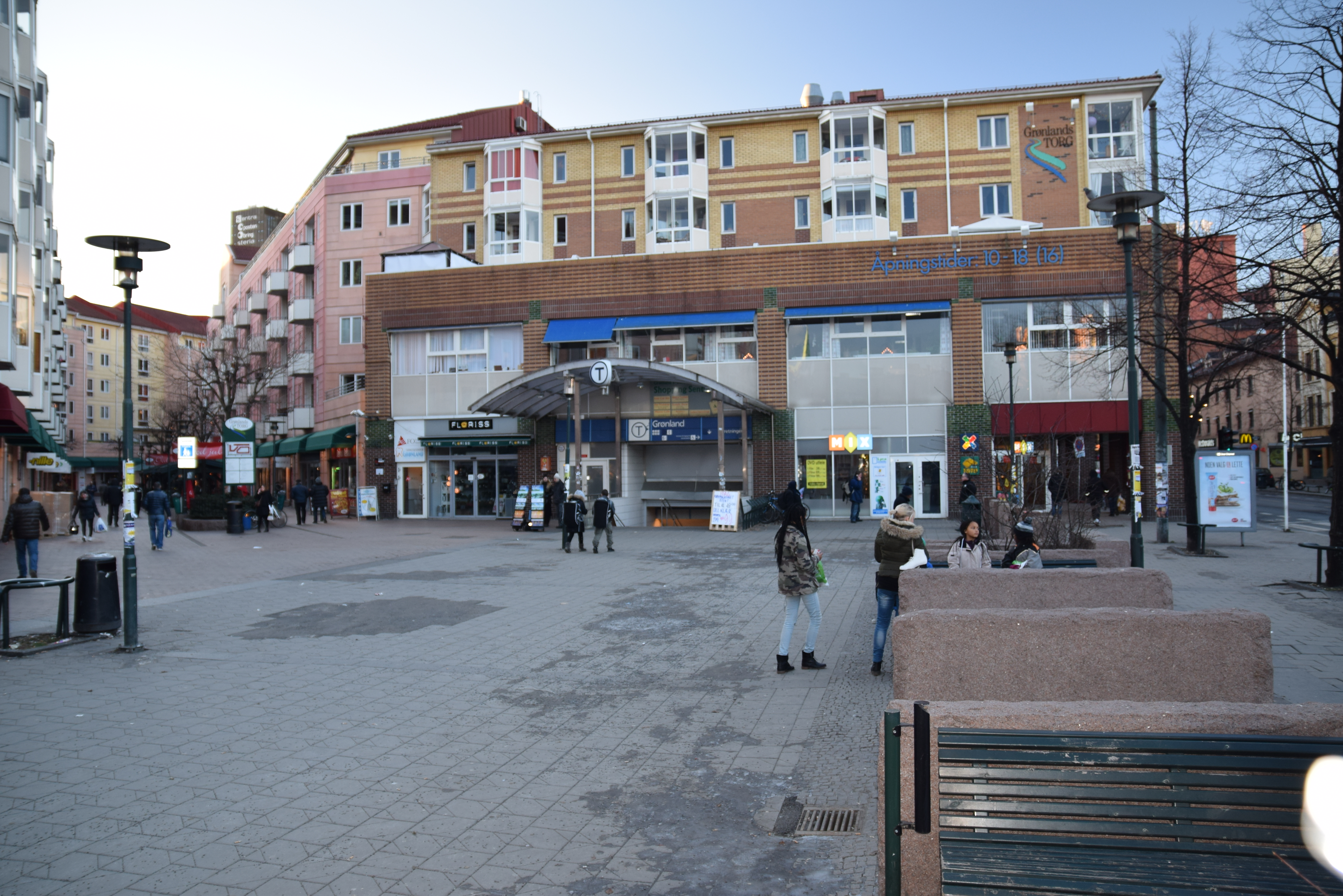
Grønland Square, entrance to the Grønland Metro Station

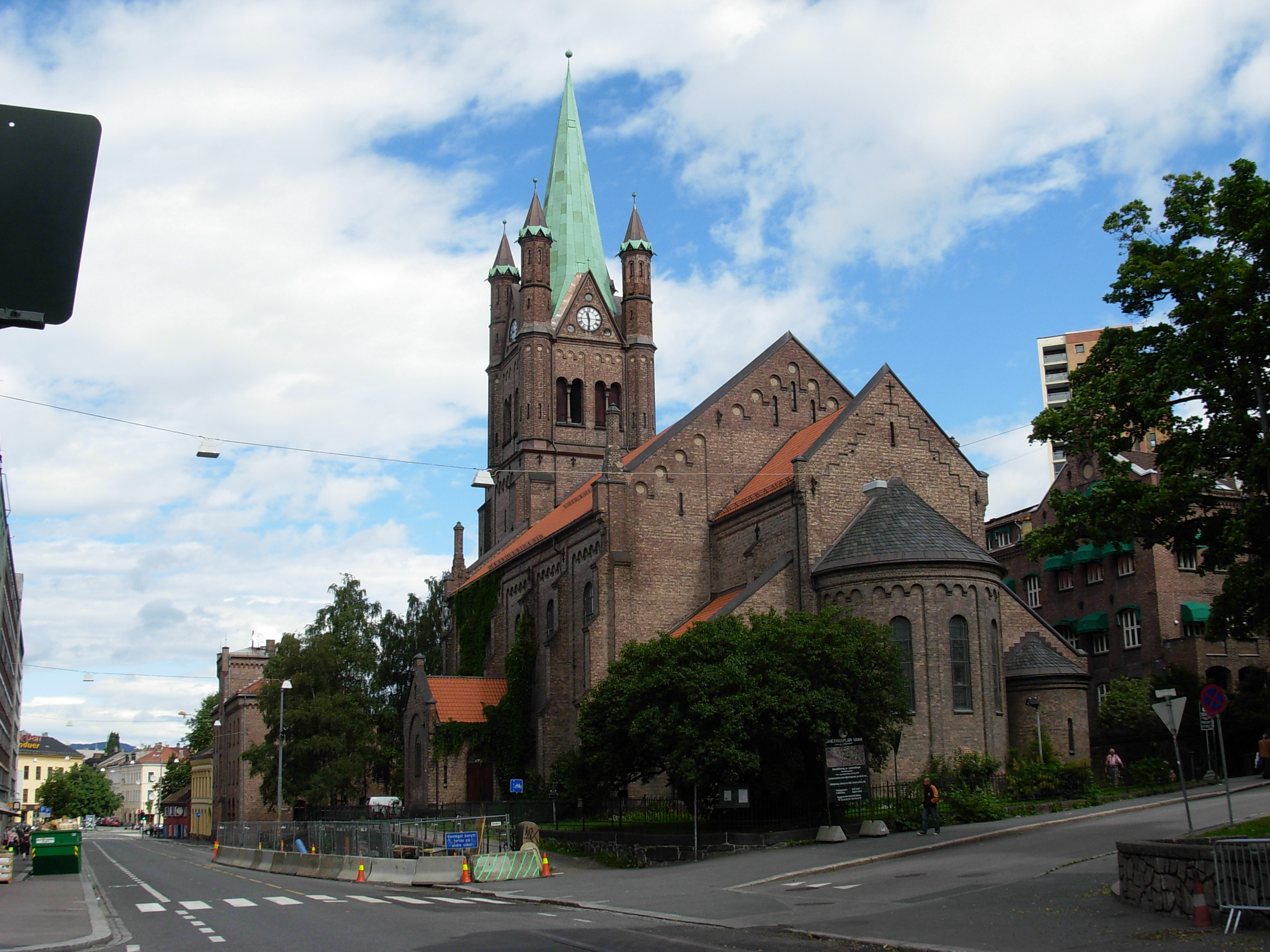
Grønland Church

Grønland (meaning "Greenland" in Norwegian) is a neighbourhood in central Oslo, Norway. It is served by several tram and bus lines, as well as the Oslo Metro at the Grønland Station. The neighborhood, along with neighboring Tøyen, is considered to be very ethnically diverse and is home to a large population of immigrants.

The neighbourhood is situated on the east side of Akerselva, five to ten minutes walking distance from Oslo Central Station and downtown Oslo. It stretches from Grünerløkka down to the fjord by Middelalderparken shore area.

== History ==
The area was originally the beach area east of the Aker river discharge, and the name alludes to grassland by the lake (the name Grønland means green land or green fields in Norwegian). The streets Grønland and Grønlandsleiret are where the old shoreline used to be. This is considered the historic northern border of Oslo. They are the old road between the suburb and Oslo (then called Christiania), via Vaterland Bridge (first bridge built 1654). The growth of Bjørvika led to the incorporation of Grønland into Christiania/Oslo in 1859. A church, a school and a fire station were built near the newly erected Botsfengslet in the 1600s.
