= Jernbanetorget station =

Oslo metro station

Jernbanetorget
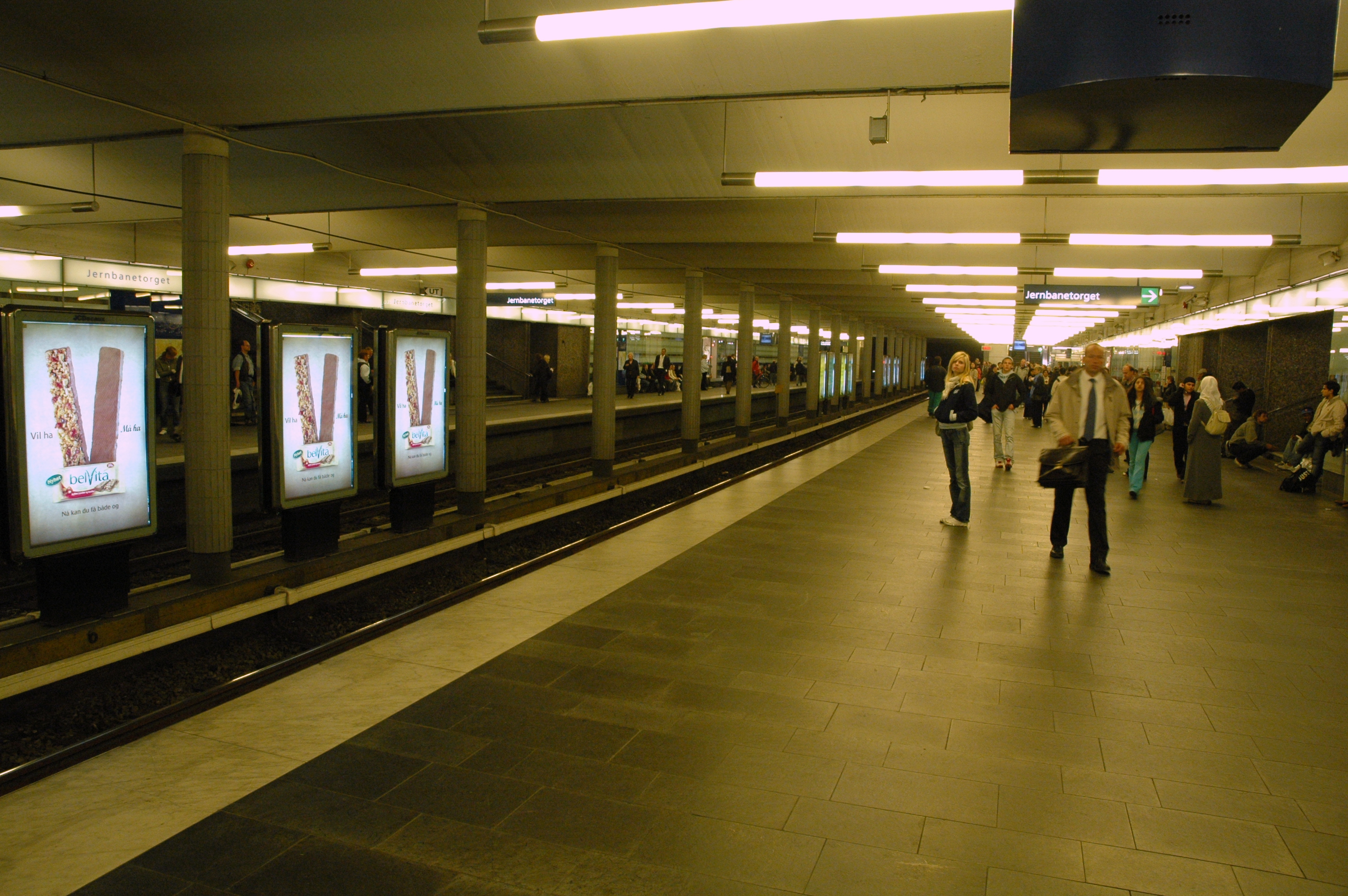

General information
- Location: Jernbanetorget, Oslo; Norway
- Coordinates: 59°54′42″N 10°45′3″E
- Owner: Sporveien
- Operator: Sporveien T-banen
- Line: Common Tunnel
- Distance: 500 m from Stortinget
- Connections: Train: Oslo S Bus: Oslo Bus Terminal

Construction
- Structure type: Underground
- Depth: 5.2 m (17 ft)
- Accessible: Yes

History
- Opened: 1966; 60 years ago

Services
Preceding station	Oslo Metro	Following station
Stortinget towards Frognerseteren	Line 1	Grønland towards Bergkrystallen
Stortinget towards Østerås	Line 2	Grønland towards Ellingsrudåsen
Stortinget towards Kolsås	Line 3	Grønland towards Mortensrud
Stortinget towards Vestli	Line 4	Grønland towards Bergkrystallen
Stortinget towards Sognsvann	Line 5	Grønland towards Vestli
Preceding station	Trams in Oslo	Following station
Dronningens gate towards Majorstuen	Line 11	Storgata towards Kjelsås
Dronningens gate towards Majorstuen	Line 12	Storgata towards Kjelsås
Stortorvet towards Rikshospitalet	Line 17	Storgata towards Grefsen
Stortorvet towards Rikshospitalet	Line 18	Storgata towards Grefsen
Stortorvet towards Majorstuen	Line 19	Bjørvika towards Ljabru
Location

Jernbanetorget or Jernbanetorvet is both a rapid transit station on the Oslo Metro and a tram stop of the Oslo Tramway. The metro station is in the Common Tunnel used by all lines under the city centre. It is located between Stortinget to the west and Grønland to the east. Until the construction of the station at Stortinget, Jernbanetorget was the end station for the eastern lines in downtown. Along with the Oslo Central Station, Oslo Bus Terminal and the tram and bus station above ground, Jernbanetorget is the largest transport hub in Norway.

All six of the subway lines (including the Ring Route - which is a part of Line 5) pass through the station, totaling 24 departures per hour during most of the day. The station is 0.5 kilometres (0.31 mi) from Stortinget and submerged 5.2 metres (17 ft) below sea level.

It is also the central hub of the tram network with five of the six lines using either the platform in front of Christiania Hotel or the one in front of the public transport information centre, Trafikanten. The sixth line, line 13, does not serve Jernbanetorget, but it stops nearby at Dronningens gate.

== History ==
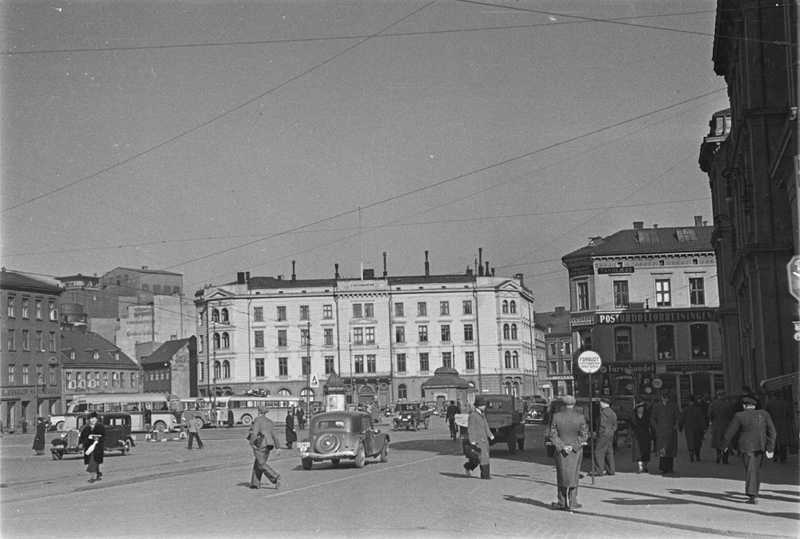
Jernbanetorget in April 1938

The tram stop opened as part of the Briskeby Line on 3 March 1894. It was originally operated by Kristiania Elektriske Sporvei and ran from the Oslo East Station to Majorstuen. There were several other lines that originally terminated here including the Frogner Line and the Skillebekk Line. In 1924, the tram companies were merged to create Oslo Sporveier, which now operated the station. Afterwards, the square of Jernbanetorget, became a location to transfer between other tram lines. There was also a trolleybus route that operated and terminated here in the mid-20th century. Also during the 1950s, the square had a complicated track arrangement. When the original Gamleby Line's tracks were shifted to run through Schweigaards gate in 1960, the trams on the Ekeberg Line terminated here. In 1966, the metro station called Jernbanetorget was established. The metro station was originally the terminus of metro's eastbound lines until Stortinget was built in 1977.
