= Oslo Bus Terminal =

Bus station in Oslo, Norway

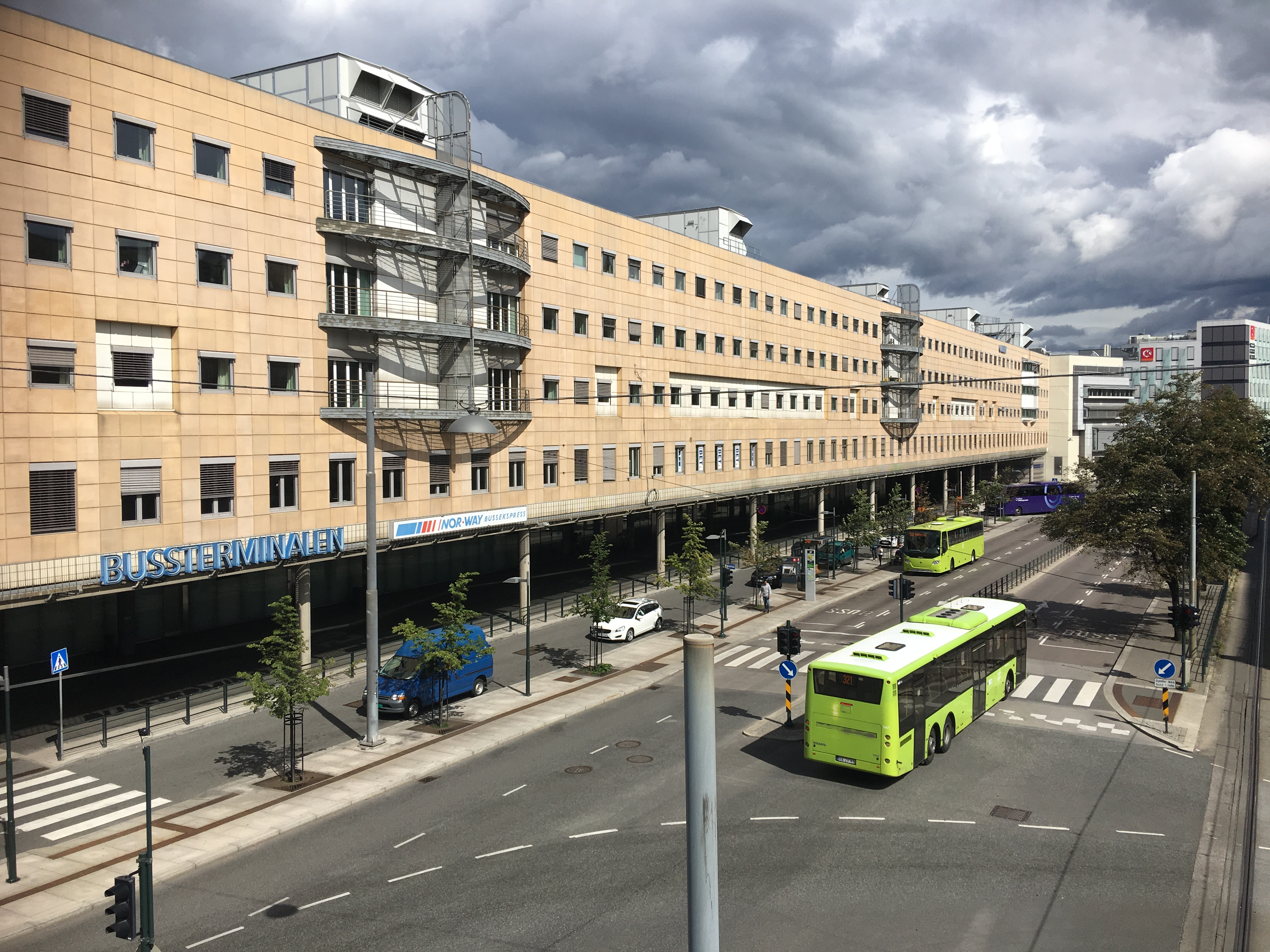

General information
- Location: Vaterland, Gamle Oslo, Oslo; Norway
- Coordinates: 59.911040°N 10.759649°E
- System: Bus station
- Line: Local buses 34, 37, 74
- Connections: Train: Oslo Central Station; Airport Express Train: Metro: Jernbanetorget (station); Bus: Ruter, Brakar, Innlandstrafikk; Coach: NOR-WAY Bussekspress, FlixBus, Vy bus4you, Vy express
Location

Oslo Bus Terminal (Norwegian: Oslo bussterminal) is the main bus station serving Oslo, Norway. It is connected to Grønland station. Also known as Oslo Bussterminal. Owned by Vaterland AS, it is located beside Oslo Central Station and serves local buses to Akershus as well as domestic and international coaches.

== Service ==
The station was built by the Akershus transit authority Stor-Oslo Lokaltrafikk as a bus station for their routes to Downtown Oslo. The station is five minutes walk from Oslo Central Station, as well as the rapid transit station Jernbanetorget and the tram and city bus services at ground on Jernbanetorget. On the east side of the station, a tram station named Bussterminalen Grønland allowed the quickest transfers to the Ekeberg Line. It was closed in late 2020.
