= List of Oslo Tramway stations =

This is a list of current stations of the Oslo Tramway, Norway.

== List ==
Schematic diagram

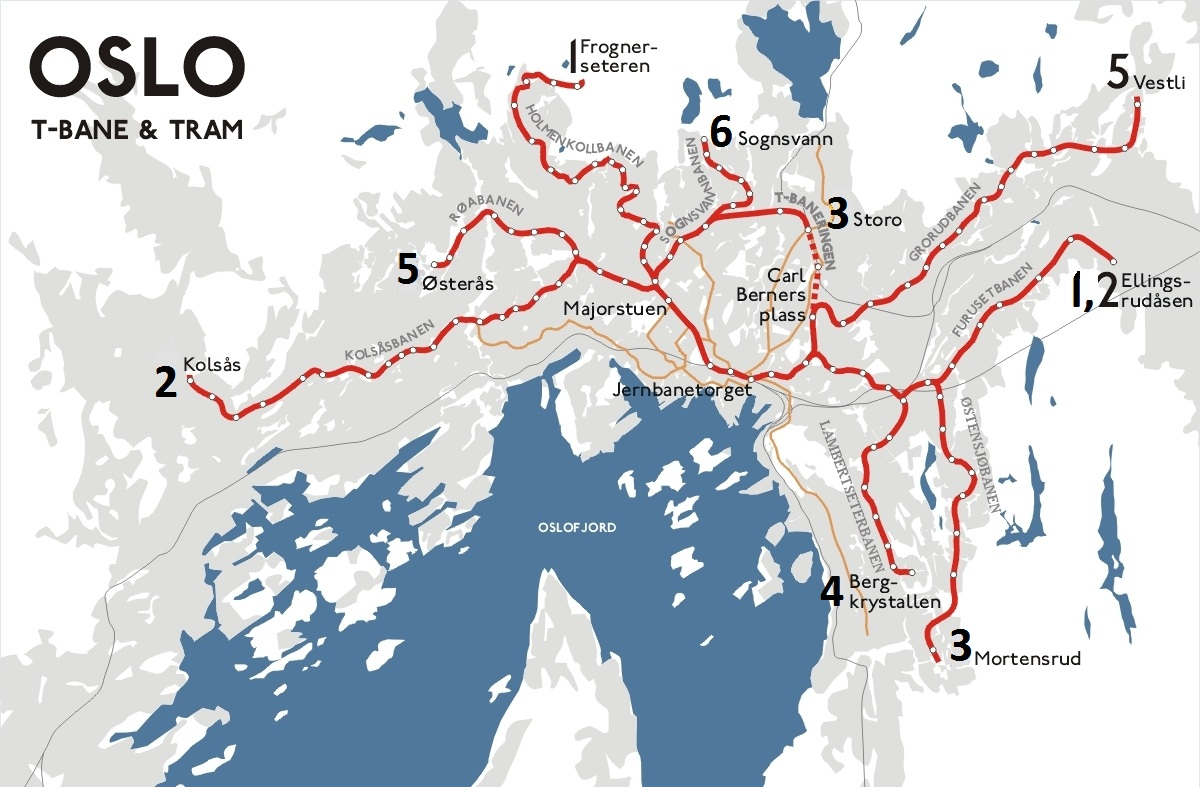
A map of the tram network in orange; metro in red

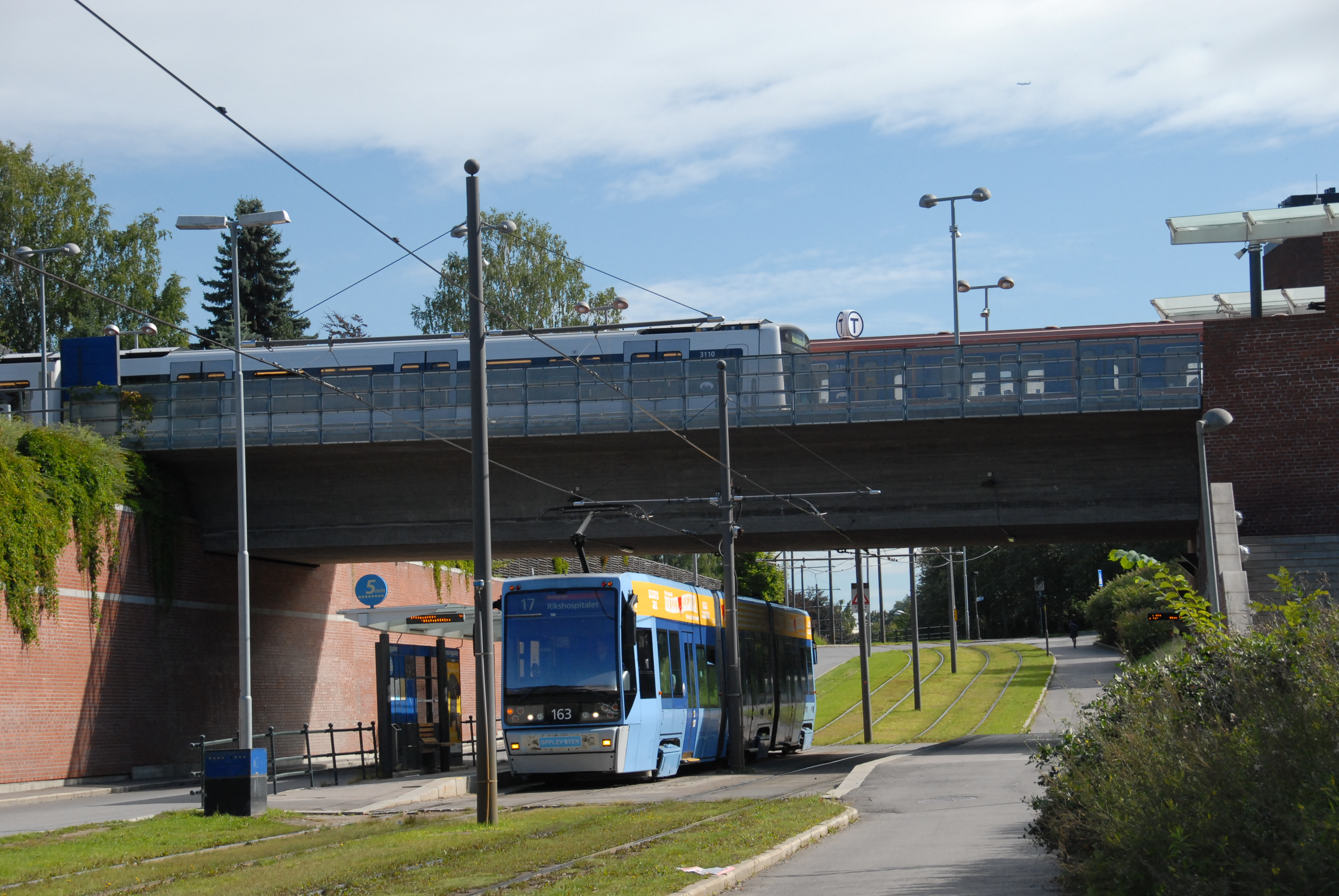
Tram meets metro at Forskningsparken

The following table lists the name of each station, the line the station is located on, the services (11 through 13 and 17 through 19), and the date the station opened. Further details are available in the articles on each station.

Station	Line	Service	Opened	Ref
Abbediengen	Lilleaker	Trams in Oslo	9 May 1919	
Adamstuen	Ullevål Hageby	Trams in Oslo	24 September 1909	
Aker brygge	Vika	Trams in Oslo	21 August 1995	
Bekkestua	Kolsås	Trams in Oslo		
Biermanns gate	Grünerløkka–Torshov	Trams in Oslo	28 November 1902	
Birkelunden	Grünerløkka–Torshov	Trams in Oslo	28 November 1902	
Bislett	Ullevål Hageby	Trams in Oslo	24 September 1909	
Briskeby	Briskeby	Trams in Oslo	2 March 1894	
Brugata	Grünerløkka–Torshov	Trams in Oslo	10 October 1875	
Bråten	Ekeberg	Trams in Oslo	11 June 1917	
Oslo bussterminal	Ekeberg	Trams in Oslo	28 April 1957	
Carl Berners plass	Sinsen	Trams in Oslo	1939	
Christiania Torv	Vika	Trams in Oslo	21 August 1995	
Dalsbergstien	Ullevål Hageby	Trams in Oslo	24 September 1909	
Disen	Kjelsås	Trams in Oslo	25 September 1934	
Dronningens gate	Briskeby	Trams in Oslo	2 March 1894	
Elisenberg	Frogner	Trams in Oslo	1902	
Forskningsparken	Ullevål Hageby	Trams in Oslo	1 June 1999	
Frogner plass	Frogner	Trams in Oslo	1902	
Frogner stadion	Frogner	Trams in Oslo	15 May 1914	
Furulund	Lilleaker	Trams in Oslo	9 May 1919	
Gaustadalléen	Ullevål Hageby	Trams in Oslo	1 June 1999	
Glads vei	Kjelsås	Trams in Oslo	25 September 1934	
Grefsen	Sinsen	Trams in Oslo	1902	
Grefsenplatået	Kjelsås	Trams in Oslo	25 September 1934	
Grefsen stadion	Kjelsås	Trams in Oslo	25 September 1934	
Grefsenveien	Grünerløkka–Torshov	Trams in Oslo	28 November 1902	
Grensen	Ullevål Hageby	Trams in Oslo	6 October 1875	
Hausmanns gate	Grünerløkka–Torshov	Trams in Oslo	10 October 1878	
Heimdalsgata	Sinsen	Trams in Oslo	27 March 1900	
Hoff	Lilleaker	Trams in Oslo	9 May 1919	
Holbergs plass	Ullevål Hageby	Trams in Oslo	6 October 1875	
Holtet	Ekeberg	Trams in Oslo	11 June 1917	
Homansbyen	Ullevål Hageby	Trams in Oslo	6 October 1875	
Høyskolesenteret	Ullevål Hageby	Trams in Oslo	6 October 1875	
Inkognitogata	Briskeby	Trams in Oslo	2 March 1894	
Jar	Kolsås	Trams in Oslo		
Jernbanetorget	Gamleby	Trams in Oslo	2 March 1894	
John Colletts plass	Ullevål Hageby	Trams in Oslo	1925	
Jomfrubråten	Ekeberg	Trams in Oslo	11 June 1917	
Kastellet	Ekeberg	Trams in Oslo	11 June 1917	
Kjelsås	Kjelsås	Trams in Oslo	25 September 1934	
Kjelsåsalléen	Kjelsås	Trams in Oslo	25 September 1934	
Kongens gate	Briskeby	Trams in Oslo	2 March 1894	
Lakkegata skole	Sinsen	Trams in Oslo	27 March 1900	
Lilleaker	Lilleaker	Trams in Oslo	9 May 1919	
Lille Frogner allé	Frogner	Trams in Oslo	1902	
Ljabru	Ekeberg	Trams in Oslo	17 September 1941	
Majorstuen	Briskeby	Trams in Oslo	2 March 1894	
Munkegata	Gamleby	Trams in Oslo	2 December 1878	
Nationaltheatret	Briskeby	Trams in Oslo	2 March 1894	
Niels Juels gate	Frogner	Trams in Oslo	1902	
Nobels gate	Skøyen	Trams in Oslo	31 December 1894	
Olaf Ryes plass	Grünerløkka–Torshov	Trams in Oslo	10 October 1878	
Øraker	Lilleaker	Trams in Oslo		
Oslo Hospital	Ekeberg	Trams in Oslo	6 October 1875	
Riddervolds plass	Briskeby	Trams in Oslo	2 March 1894	
Rikshospitalet	Ullevål Hageby	Trams in Oslo	1 June 1999	
Rosenborg	Briskeby	Trams in Oslo	2 March 1894	
Rosenhoff	Sinsen	Trams in Oslo	1939	
Rådhusplassen	Vika	Trams in Oslo	21 August 1995	
Sanatoriet	Kjelsås	Trams in Oslo	25 September 1934	
Sandaker senter	Grünerløkka–Torshov	Trams in Oslo	28 November 1902	
Schous plass	Grünerløkka–Torshov	Trams in Oslo	10 October 1878	
Schultz gate	Briskeby	Trams in Oslo	2 March 1894	
Sinsenkrysset	Sinsen	Trams in Oslo	1939	
Sinsenterrassen	Sinsen	Trams in Oslo	1939	
Sjømannsskolen	Ekeberg	Trams in Oslo	11 June 1917	
Skarpsno	Skøyen	Trams in Oslo	31 December 1894	
Skillebekk	Skøyen	Trams in Oslo	2 March 1894	
Skøyen	Skøyen	Trams in Oslo	21 June 1903	
Sofienberg	Sinsen	Trams in Oslo	1939	
Solli	Skøyen	Trams in Oslo	2 March 1894	
Sportsplassen	Ekeberg	Trams in Oslo	11 June 1917	
Stensgata	Ullevål Hageby	Trams in Oslo	24 September 1909	
St Halvards plass	Gamleby	Trams in Oslo	2 December 1878	
Storo	Grünerløkka–Torshov	Trams in Oslo	28 November 1902	
Stortorvet	Ullevål Hageby	Trams in Oslo	6 October 1875	
Sæter	Ekeberg	Trams in Oslo	11 June 1917	
Sørli	Ekeberg	Trams in Oslo	11 June 1917	
Thune	Skøyen	Trams in Oslo	1901	
Tinghuset	Ullevål Hageby	Trams in Oslo	6 October 1875	
Torshov	Grünerløkka–Torshov	Trams in Oslo	28 November 1902	
Tullinløkka	Ullevål Hageby	Trams in Oslo	6 October 1875	
Ullern	Lilleaker	Trams in Oslo	9 May 1919	
Ullevål sykehus	Ullevål Hageby	Trams in Oslo	1925	
Universitetet Blindern	Ullevål Hageby	Trams in Oslo	1 June 1999	
Uranienborgveien	Briskeby	Trams in Oslo	2 March 1894	
Vigelandsparken	Frogner	Trams in Oslo	15 May 1914	
Vikatorvet	Vika	Trams in Oslo	21 August 1995	
Wessels plass	Briskeby	Trams in Oslo	2 March 1894	
