= Ekebergbanen (company) =

Former Norwegian tram operator

AS Ekebergbanen
- Type: Private
- Industry: Transport
- Founded: 1914
- Defunct: 1993
- Fate: Nationalization
- Successor: Oslo Sporveier
- Headquarters: Oslo, Norway

AS Ekebergbanen was a private company that built and operated the Ekeberg Line in Oslo, Norway. It was founded 27 March 1914, and the line opened 11 June 1917 from Stortorvet to Sæter. The company also built a line to Simensbråten that was closed 29 October 1967. Ekebergbanen also operated buses in Oslo. The company was taken over by Oslo Sporveier in 1948 and formally merged in 1992.

== History ==
The company was founded on 24 March 1914, and started construction of the line immediately, but the delivery of technical equipment and rolling stock was delayed because of the First World War. The company's formal establishment was therefore made on 1 June 1917, when the line between Stortorvet and Sæter was opened. In 1918, AS Ekebergbanen sent an application to build a funicular from Gamlebyen (then called Oslo) to Ekebergplatået. The stations were mostly built with tiny wooden sheds in new baroque architectural style by the Norwegian architect Erik Glosimodt. On the station Holtet, a larger station building was constructed, also drawn by Erik Glosimodt. This was to be the "main base" for Ekebergbanen, equipped with power stations with and a tram depot with place for twelve cars on six tracks. The depot is still used by the Oslo Tramway.

In 1924, the company started to operate diesel buses, especially a route from Oslo city centre to Sværsvann named "Østmarkruten". This bus route was in 1953 overtaken by Oslo Sporveier and renumbered to line 71.

On 30 September 1931, a branch line from Jomfrubråten to Simensbråten was opened, officially named Simensbråten Line. The service on this branch line was during the peak hours extended to Stortorvet. The Simensbråten Line was closed on 29 October 1967.

The Ekeberg Line was extended from Sæter to Ljabru on 17 September 1941, which originally was single-tracked.

While waiting for the Gullfisk-trams, Ekebergbanen borrowed trams from Bærumsbanen until 1974.

On 1 July 1948, Oslo Sporveier bought the major share of the company's stocks. 17 years later—on the same day—the administration and operation of the two lines were transferred to Oslo Sporveier. The company formally merged with Oslo Sporveier on 1 July 1992, and was declared defunct the year after.

== Tram lines ==
The Ekeberg Line is a 6.6-kilometre (4.1 mi) long continuation of the Gamleby Line, from which it connects at Oslo Hospital. The entire line is built as a light rail with its own right-of-way. It runs up Ekeberg on the east side of Kongsveien, passing Sjømannsskolen and Jomfrubråten. This is where the Simensbråten Line previously branched off. It was 1.3-kilometre (0.8 mi) long and had three stations: Ekebergparken, Smedstua and Simensbråten. The Ekeberg Line continues from Jomfrubråten past Sportsplassen to Holtet, which is the location of the depot. The line then crosses Kongsveien and continues along the west side of Ekebergveien. It passes the stations Sørli, Kastellet, Bråten and Sæter. Between Sæter and the terminus Ljabru is a bridge over Nordstrandsveien which is single tracked. The remaining part of the network was eventually double track and electrified at 1,200 volts direct current.

== Bus operations ==
In 1924, Ekebergbanen bought four Berliet buses with bodies from Skabo Jernbanevognfabrikk and put them into service on two lines, from Jernbanetorget to Abildsø and from Sæter to Godheim. The latter route was used to feed the Ekeberg Line. In 1927, the company bought Republic and Studebaker buses, and in 1928 four Büssing buses which replaced the Berliet vehicles. From 1927 to 1931, the company ran a bus line from Jernbanetorget to Simensbråten, and also for some years from Nordstrandshøgda to Aker University Hospital. From 28 August 1932, the two original bus lines were combined and extended to Sværsvann. It was branded as Østmarkaruten and ran the route Jernbanetorget–Abildsø–Klemetsrud–Godheim–Sværsvann. In 1937, the company bought four diesel buses from Büssing. In 1940, the company had four modern diesel buses and three older gasoline buses. The company had silver buses with a wine red cheatline with the EB logo in silver on a blue background. The company also ran an automotive workshop and fuel station at Holtet.

During World War II, the operation of buses was limited, although because some of the buses ran on diesel, it was easier to procure fuel, compared to gasoline buses. One of the buses was rebuilt to a truck. From 1946 to 1951, the company bought new buses from Scania-Vabis and Volvo, with bodies built at Holtet. From 1 February 1952, the Østmarkaruten was transferred to Oslo Sporveier, which numbered it Line 71. The buses continued to use Holtet as a depot until 1957, when they were transferred to Grefsen.

== Trams ==
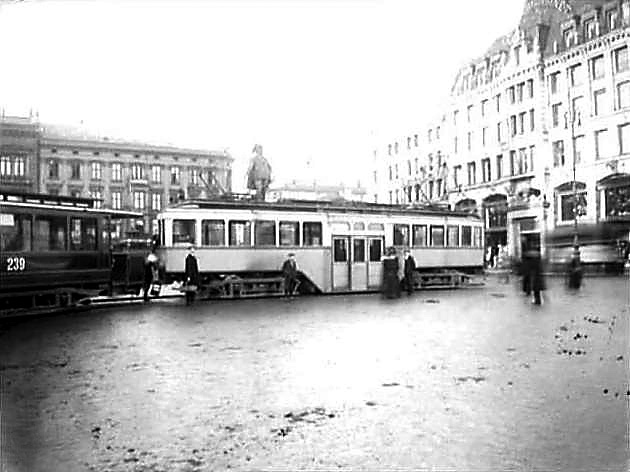
An Ekebergbanen tram in 1918

The company operated several classes of unique trams, which were only used on the Ekeberg Line, the Simensbråten Line and the connection to the city center. They were all capable of both running on 1,200 V on the Ekeberg and Simenbråten Lines, and 600 V in the city. The junction between the two networks was a 10-metre (33 ft) section without an overhead wire at Oslo Hospital. This allowed each of the pantographs to touch their current at the same time. All the trams had four motors, each running at 600 V. They were grouped in two pairs, each serial connected. The two groups were connected so they were either serial or parallel connected, so each motor would either receive 300 V or 600 V. However, they were not connected to they would receive the same current in the city as on the hill section, thus the trams had only half the power when running on the 600 V section, with each motor either running at 150 V or 300 V. However, peak power was not needed, as the city was flat and had a maximum speed limit of 40 kilometres per hour (25 mph).

== Sources ==
- "A/S Ekebergbanen (A-40207)" (in Norwegian). Oslo City Archives. Archived from the original on 22 July 2011.
- Andersen, Bjørn (1992). Ekebergbanen 75 år (in Norwegian). Oslo: Lokaltrafikkhistorisk Forening. ISBN 82-91223-00-9.
- Aspenberg, Nils C. (2007). "A/S Ekebergbanen". In Henriksen, Petter (ed.). Store norske leksikon (in Norwegian). Oslo: Kunnskapsforlaget.
- Fristad, Hans A. (1987). Oslo-trikken: Storbysjel på skinner (in Norwegian). Oslo: Gyldendal Norsk Forlag. ISBN 82-05-17358-3.
- Krogstie, Anne-Lise (1992). "Historien om Ekebergbanen". Eikabergtinget (in Norwegian). Archived from the original on 26 July 2011.
- Hartmann, Eivind; Mangset, Øistein (2001). Neste stopp: verneplan for bygninger (in Norwegian). Baneforlaget. ISBN 82-91448-17-5.
- Witt, Wilhelm (1947). Ekebergbanen 1917—1947 (in Norwegian). Oslo: A/S Ekebergbanen.
