= Ekebergparken tram stop =

Tram stop in Oslo, Norway

Ekebergparken
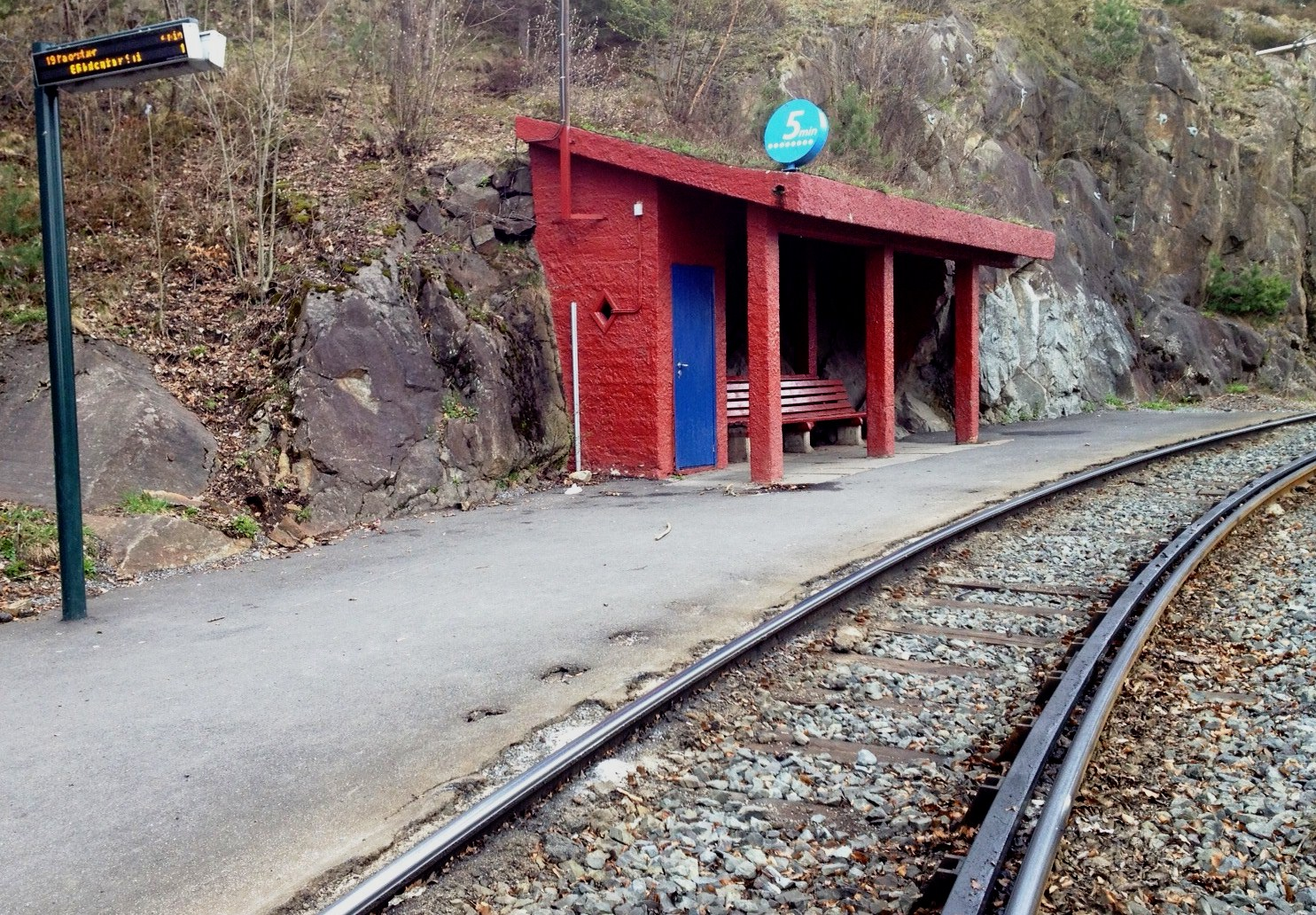

General information
- Location: Ekeberg, Nordstrand, Oslo; Norway
- Coordinates: 59.8977°N 10.7593°E
- Line: Ekeberg Line

History
- Opened: 11 June 1917
Location

Ekebergparken (Formerly: Sjømannsskolen) is a light rail station on the Ekeberg Line of the Oslo Tramway. It is located near Sjømannsskolen (the Seamen School) in Ekeberg and Ekebergparken Sculpture Park nearby. The station is located in the borough of Nordstrand, in Oslo, Norway.

The station opened on 11 June 1917 as part of the Ekeberg Line to Sæter. The station is served by lines 13 and 19, using both SL79 and SL95 trams.

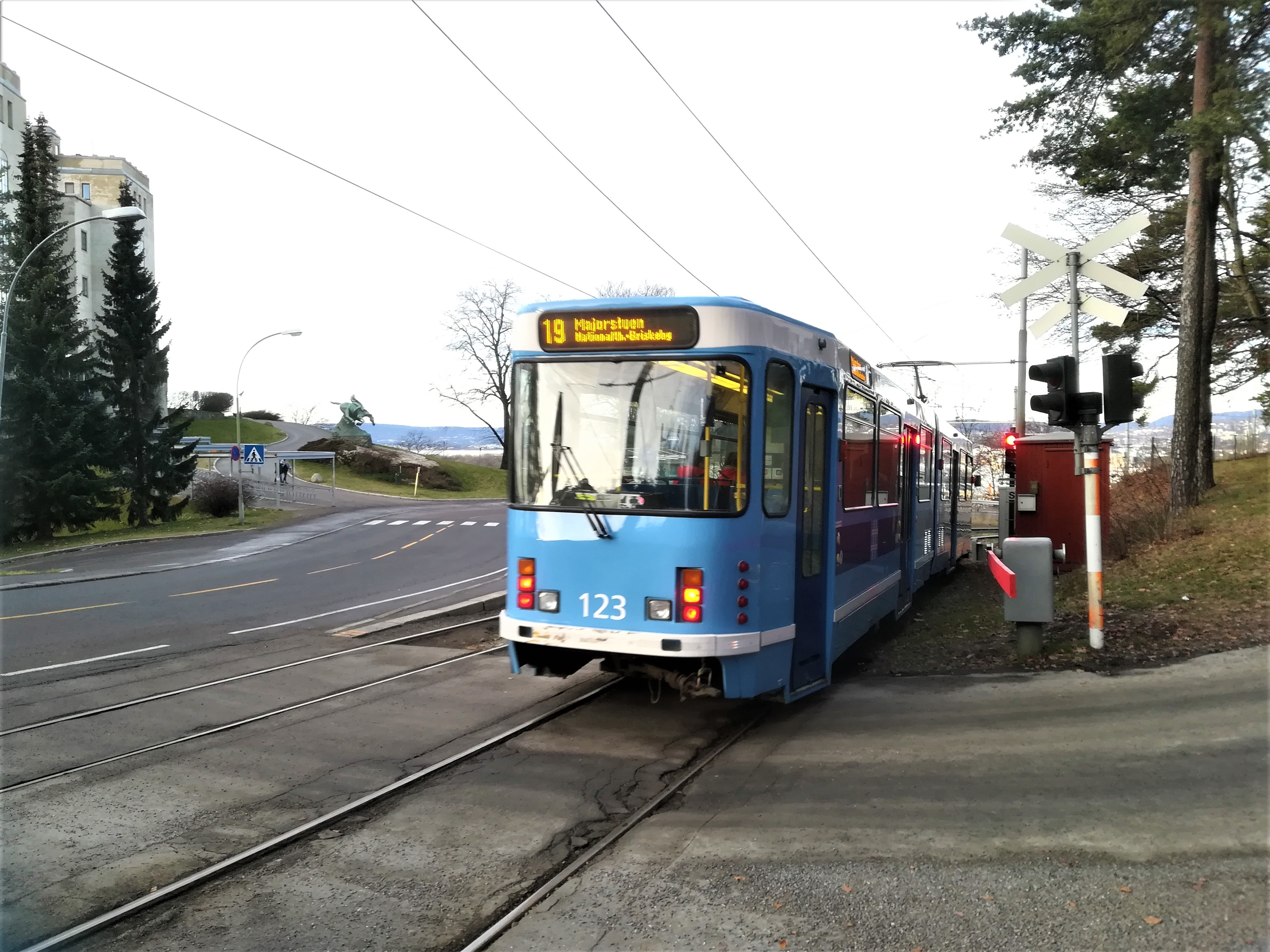
Tram entering the station

Preceding station	Trams in Oslo	Following station
Oslo Hospital towards Bekkestua	Line 13	Jomfrubråten One-way operation
Oslo Hospital towards Bekkestua	Line 13	Sportsplassen towards Ljabru
Oslo Hospital towards Majorstuen	Line 19	Jomfrubråten One-way operation
Oslo Hospital towards Majorstuen	Line 19	Sportsplassen towards Ljabru
