= Ekeberghallen =

Indoor sports arena in Oslo, Norway

Coordinates: 59°53′30″N 10°46′38″E

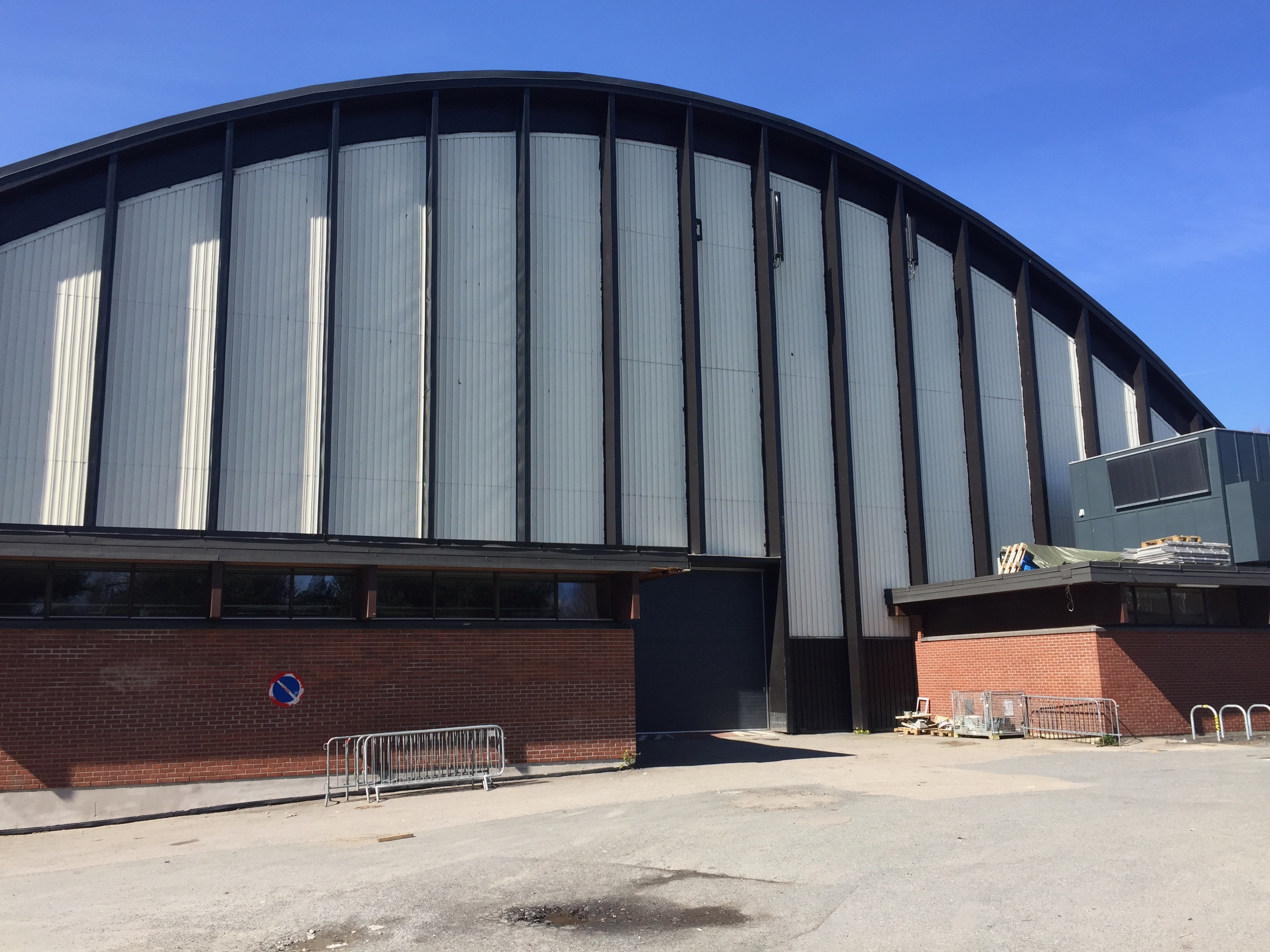
Ekeberghallen

Ekeberghallen, also known as Ekeberg idrettshall, is an indoor sports arena located at Ekebergsletta in the neighborhood of Ekeberg in the Nordstrand district of Oslo, Norway. Ekebergsletta is part of the Oslo park system and is used primarily for sporting events.

== History ==
Ekeberghallen was opened in 1973 and expanded in 1981 when adjacent office localities named Osloidrettens Hus were opened as well. The court size is 46 × 75 meters, and the audience capacity is 4800. The facility is divided into badminton courts, handball courts, tennis courts, volleyball courts and is fully equipped for athletics. It has wardrobes, sound system, stage / table and chairs for alternative use. It is used, among other things, in connection with the Norway Cup.

The hall is owned by Oslo Idrettskrets. It is mainly used by Bækkelagets Sportsklub and other sports clubs in the city, for indoor sports such as basketball, handball, volleyball, badminton, indoor athletics and futsal. The venue is also notable for hosting concerts for musicians and bands such as Johnny Cash, Frank Sinatra, Toto, The Beach Boys, and Frank Zappa among others. On weekends without demand from sports, the hall is rented out for other purposes such as exhibitions, concerts, conferences and meetings. It has also been used as a professional boxing venue.
