= Holtet tram stop =

Tram stop in Oslo, Norway

Holtet
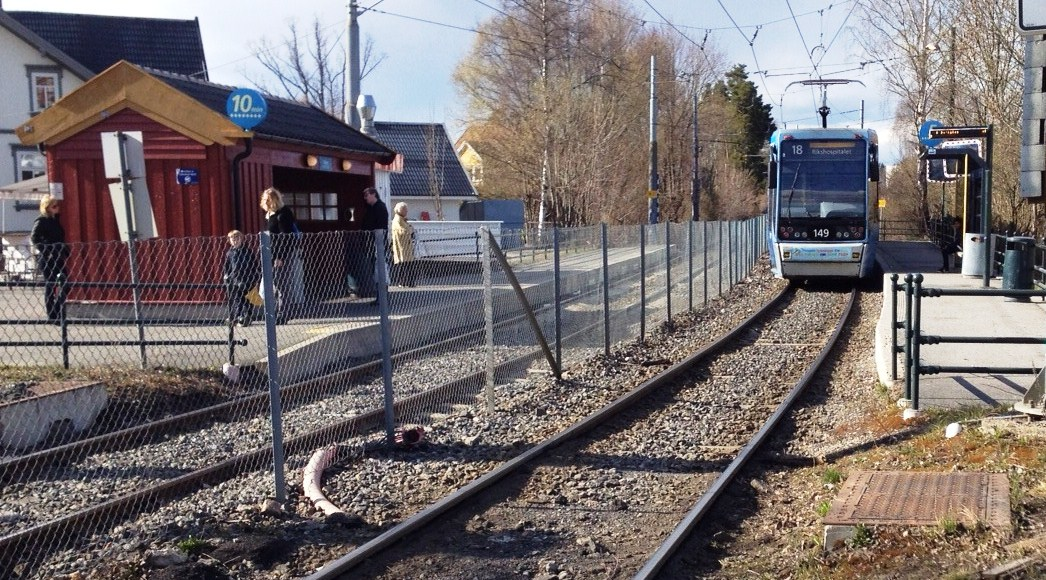

General information
- Location: Nordstrand, Oslo; Norway
- Coordinates: 59.881514°N 10.784154°E
- Line: Ekeberg Line

History
- Opened: 11 June 1917
Location

Holtet is a light rail/tram stop on the Ekeberg line of the Oslo Tramway. It is located at Holtet in Ekeberg, in the borough of Nordstrand, in Oslo, Norway. It was opened on 11 June 1917 by A/S Ekebergbanen and has a balloon loop. The station is served by lines 13 and 19.

== Holtet depot ==
In the summer of 1917, Ekebergbanen constructed a depot at Holtet with six tracks to store twelve trams. It had a converter station and a workshop, but also served as an administration building. In 1919, it was expanded to accommodate a forge, a machine workshop and a painting workshop. In 1942, a new depot was built, which could store eight trams. Between 1951 and 1952, it was expanded once again.

The depot once held rolling stock owned by Ekebergbanen, but following the subsequent takeover by Oslo Sporveier, it held their rolling stock instead. Currently, it is one of only two remaining depots owned and operated by Sporveien Trikken, the other one being Grefsen Depot.

Preceding station	Trams in Oslo	Following station
Sportsplassen towards Bekkestua	Line 13	Sørli towards Ljabru
Sportsplassen towards Majorstuen	Line 19	Sørli towards Ljabru
