= Bråten tram stop =

Tram stop in Oslo, Norway

Bråten
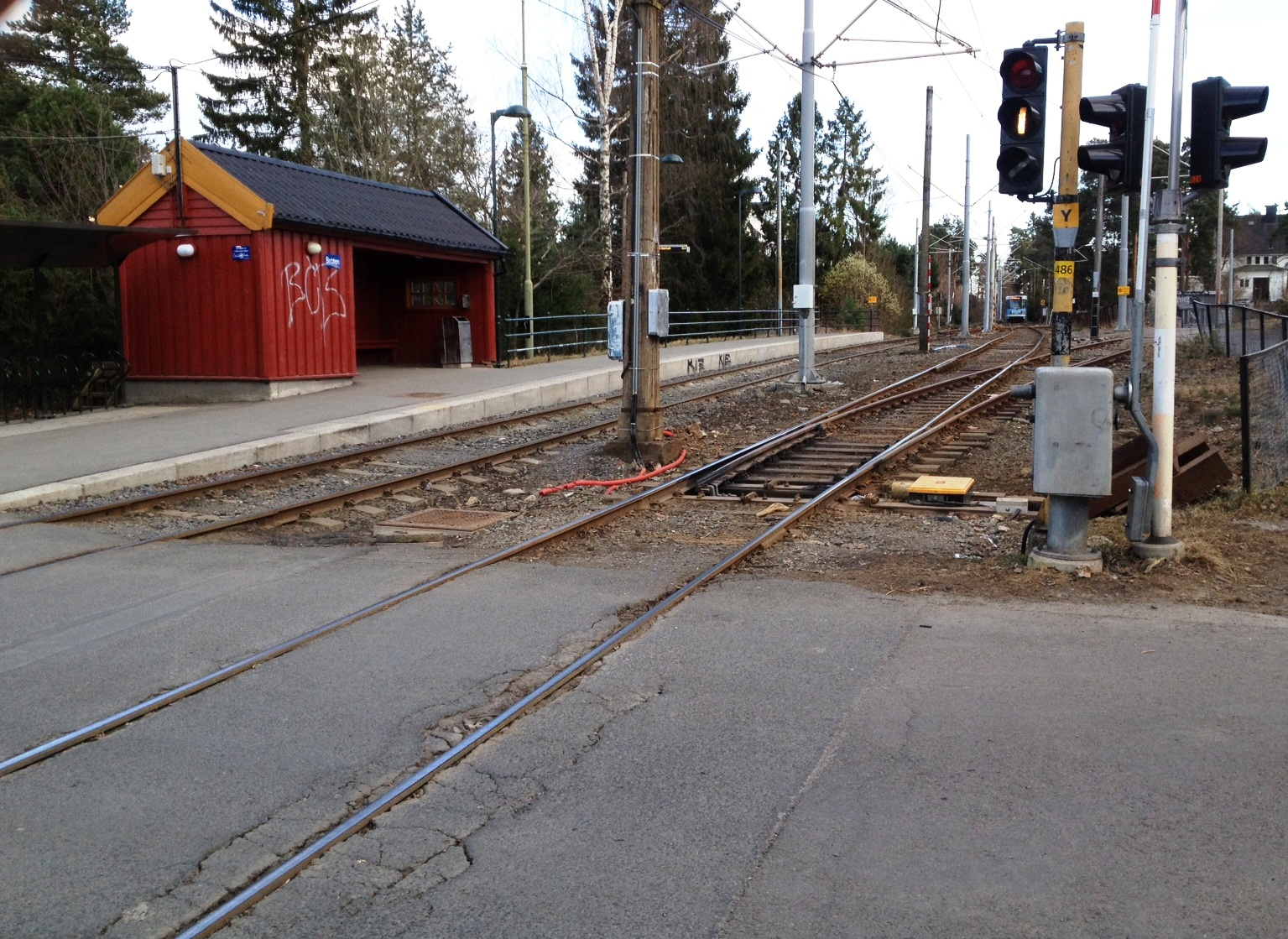

General information
- Location: Nordstrand, Oslo; Norway
- Coordinates: 59.867141°N 10.792436°E
- Elevation: 117.8 metres (386 ft)
- Line: Ekeberg Line

History
- Opened: 11 June 1917

Services
Preceding station	Trams in Oslo	Following station
Kastellet towards Bekkestua	Line 13	Sæter towards Ljabru
Kastellet towards Majorstuen	Line 19	Sæter towards Ljabru
Location

Bråten is a tram stop on the Oslo Tramway.

It is located at Bråten in Nordstrand and it was opened on 11 June 1917, as part of the Ekeberg Line to Sæter. There is a balloon loop just after the station. The SL18 trams were tested between Skøyen tram stop and Bråten, in early 2022 as part of Line 13.

The section between Sørli tram stop and Bråten was upgraded in 2012, and Bråten itself was upgraded in 2013.
