= Sportsplassen =

Sports stadium in Oslo, Norway

- Sporten
- Interactive map of Sportsplassen
- Full name: Sportsplassen
- Coordinates: 59°53′11″N 10°46′33″E

Tenants
- Bækkelagets SK (football, track and field)

Sportsplassen ("The Sports Field") is a multi-use stadium in Nordstrand, Oslo, Norway. It is currently used mostly for track and field meets and football matches, both under the auspices of Bækkelagets SK.

The 400-metre athletics track was inaugurated in 2012.

It is served by the station Sportsplassen on the Oslo Tramway.
