= Ekebergbanen rolling stock =

Ekebergbanen has operated a series of similar trams for use on the Ekeberg Line, the Simensbråten Line and the line in towards the city center. The trams were in use between 1917 and 1974.

== History ==
Since the Ekeberg Line was built as a light rail with its own right-of-way, rather than a street tram, it was desired to design trams that were fast and had more sophisticated braking and motor systems than normal street trams. Ekebergbanen therefore decided to buy five bogie trams, which were delivered in 1917. The body and mechanical equipment was built by Skabo Jernbanevognfabrikk, while the electrical components were built by Siemens-Schuckertwerke. Capacity was for 40 or 38 seated passengers.

In 1920, the rolling stock was expanded with seven trams. These trams were of the same type as the original bogie trams, but they had more powerful engines. Four years later, six bogie trailers were delivered from Hannoversche Waggonfabrik, which were somewhat smaller and had seats for 36 passengers.

== Specifications ==
The company operated several classes of unique trams, which were only used on the Ekeberg Line, the Simensbråten Line and the connection to the city center. They were all capable of both running on 1,200 V on the Ekeberg and Simenbråten Lines, and 600 V in the city. The junction between the two networks was a 10-meter (33 ft) section without an overhead wire at Oslo Hospital. This allowed each of the pantographs to touch their current at the same time. All the trams had four motors, each running at 600 V. They were group in two pairs, each serial connected. The two groups were connected so they were either serial or parallel connected, so each motor would either receive 300 V or 600 V. However, they were not connected to they would receive the same current in the city as on the hill section, thus the trams had only half the power when running on the 600 V section, with each motor either running at 150 V or 300 V. However, peak power was not needed, as the city was flat and had a maximum speed limit of 40 kilometers per hour (25 mph).

When changing between the currents, the lighting, heating, compressor and battery chargers all had to be manually changed with a switch. Lighting and heating was serial connected, with each light series consisting of six 110 V lamps, while the heaters were connected three and three in series. When the trams ran on the 1,200 volt sections, the switch connected pairs of series together. The compressor ran at 600 V; when running on the higher current, a resistance was added. If the switch was activated while running on the 1,200 V section, fuses would blow, occasionally light bulbs would blow, and sometimes the compressor would also blow, making it impossible to operate the tram.

The oldest trams (1001–1005) controlled the motor current directly, through a slipring contact with five serial, four parallel and five braking steps. These controlled the power output directly, with a mechanism that breaking the power to the motors occurred in a contactor. The other trams had control current controllers, which was a 100 V power which controlled a contactor which again controlled the motors. Originally, the power was fed directly from the pantograph to the motors, via a resistance. From 1931, the trams were rebuilt with battery which fed the motors. Trams built from 1920 could be run in pairs with multiple-unit train control, via a cable with the control current. From 1943, plugs to connect the cables were not installed when trams were renovated. The maximum speed of the trams were 40 kilometers per hour (25 mph) when running at 600 V and 60 kilometers per hour (37 mph) when running at 1,200 V.

The trams had dynamic braking, where the motors were connected so they acted as a generator. However, the energy was simply used up in the resistance. This was only used as an emergency brake, in part because the equipment was not suitable, in part to not wear the motors more than necessary. Trams 1001–1016 had track brakes which were 8 electromagnets aimed at the tracks. All the trams had air brakes, manufactured by Knorr and Westinghouse. Trams 1013–1016 had electro-pneumatic air brakes, which had electrically controlled vents.

The trams had two parallel-connected pantographs, which were both used simultaneously. The back pantograph could be lowered by air pressure by the driver when the pantographs were used to control switches. During the 1950s, Oslo Sporveier started rebuilding the switches so that it was controlled by the tram, based on whether or not it was using power at a point. A-switches were made so the tram was to pass with power being drawn if the switch was to stay in the same place or go to the left, while B-switches would change if there was no power being drawn. Ekebergbanen's trailers were also equipped with pantographs, although these were only used to supply heating and lighting. However, both the double motor car pantographs and the trailer pantographs caused problems with the electrical switches, and were eventually discontinued in the city streets. All trailers from no. 1048 were delivered with a power cord to connect to the motor car, and some of the older trams were also rebuilt.

All trams had a low inside center, allowing access to the tram at platform height, but with inside stairs. Trams 1001–1016 and 1031–1040 were delivered with doors on both sides, which were originally hand-operated. Trams 1013–1016 also had a small door on the driver's right side, but these not much used. When the trams were rebuilt, they were gradually only given a door on one side, and in the end only 1001, 1003 and 1004 (new) had doors on both sides. Along with 1002 (new), these were bidirectional with a driver's cab at both ends to allow the pendulum running on the Simensbråten Line. They were also equipped with a dead man's control to allow them to run without a conductor.

Based on the new trams 1010–1012, many of the older trams were rebuilt in the period 1955 to 1962. For 1013–1016, this included removal of the left doors, air brake operation of the right doors, removal of the front door on 1013, and the front windows received a rubber frame. Inside, the separation wall was replaced with glass walls, and the ability to change the direction of the seats was removed, and installed on 1002–1004. 1018, 1019 and 1021–1023 were also similarly modernized. 1020 had a different body, which was designed for trailers, and was retired in 1966, without being modernized.

Trailers were equipped with three cables: a high-pressure air hose (for brakes and doors), a 110 V controlling current for signaling, electropneumatic brakes, switching between currents and lighting for brakes and destination films; and a cable with 600/1,200 V power for the lights and heating. 1043–1046 were rubber window frames and air pressure doors, while 1047–1049 was delivered with this. 1050–1052 had a simpler interior.

At the time the trams were extended to Skøyen, 1001–1005 and 1021–1023 were equipped with radios. All of the trams had a conductor, which communicated with the driver with electric bells and pulling of a rope. One signal meant "clear", two means "backwards" and three meant "stop".

Until 1955, the company had no maintenance of way rolling stock, and used an available tram. From 1955, tram 1007 was converted to a maintenance car, including an extra compressor, larger air tank, and seats were removed to allow more space for tools, as well as a steering mechanism for the plow to allow it to be controlled by the driver. It remained in use until 1977.

All trams and trailers had bogies from Skabo, with exception of 1037–1040, which had bogies from the manufacturer Nivelles. In 1931, 1003 was rebuilt with a width of 2.5 meters (8 ft 2 in) and a higher seating capacity.

== List of trams ==
Number	Delivered	Direction	Manufacturer	Motor	Length	Width	Weight	Power	Capacity
1001–1003	1917	Uni	Skabo	Siemens D561a	14.9	2.1	26.0	168	40/35
1004–1005	1917	Bi	Skabo	Siemens D561a	14.9	2.1	26.5	168	38/35
1006–1012	1920–21	Bi	Skabo	NEBB GTM4	14.9	2.1	26.5	200	38/35
1031–1036	1925	Bi	HaWa	—	11.2	2.5	12.0	—	36/26
1037–1040	1928–29	Bi	Nivelles	—	14.9	2.2	16.8	—	56/20
1013–1016	1932	Uni	Skabo	Siemens D752	14.9	2.5	23.5	308	38/35
1041	1939	Uni	Holtet	—	14.9	2.5	16.8	—	56/20
1042–1043	1940–41	Uni	Skabo	—	14.9	2.5	13.9	—	56/37
1017	1941	Uni	Holtet	Siemens D561a	14.9	2.5	23.0	308	50/37
1044–1045	1942–43	Uni	Holtet	—	14.9	2.5	13.9	—	56/37
1046	1950	Uni	Holtet	—	14.9	2.5	13.9	—	56/37
1018–1023	1943–52	Uni	Holtet	NEBB GTM4	14.9	2.5	23.0	200	50/37
1047	1953	Uni	Holtet	—	14.9	2.5	12.6	—	50/40
1048–1049	1954–55	Uni	Larvik	—	14.9	2.5	12.6	—	50/40
1050–1052	1955	Uni	Larvik	—	13.5	2.5	12.0	—	50/50
1010–12 (new)	1953–54	Uni	Holtet	Siemens D752	14.9	2.5	23.0	308	44/56
1005 (new)	1955	Bi	Holtet	Siemens D561a	14.9	2.5	23.0	168	44/52
1002 (new)	1956	Bi	Holtet	Siemens D561a	14.9	2.5	23.0	168	39/52
1001 (new)	1957	Bi	Holtet	Siemens D561a	14.9	2.5	23.0	168	43/52
1003 (new)	1957	Bi	Holtet	Siemens D561a	14.9	2.5	23.0	168	47/37
1004 (new)	1960	Bi	Holtet	Siemens D561a	14.9	2.5	23.0	168	43/52
