= Sportsplassen tram stop =

Light rail/tram stop in Oslo, Norway

Sportsplassen
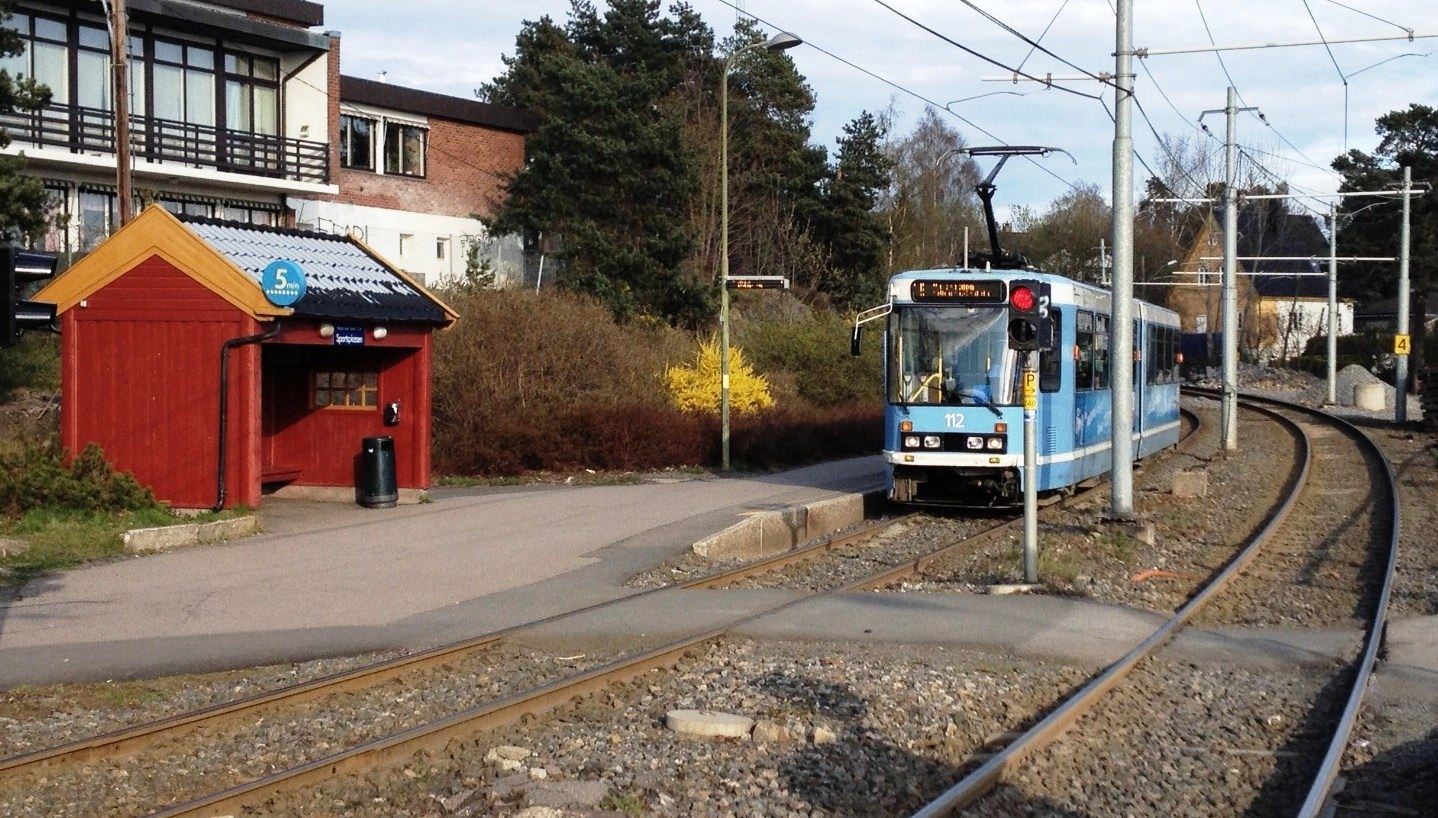

General information
- Location: Ekeberg, Nordstrand, Oslo; Norway
- Coordinates: 59.8860°N 10.7736°E
- Line: Ekeberg Line

History
- Opened: 11 June 1917
Location

Sportsplassen is a tram stop on the Ekeberg Line of the Oslo Tramway. It is located near Sportsplassen in Ekeberg, in the borough of Nordstrand, in Oslo, Norway.

The station opened on 11 June 1917 as part of the Ekeberg Line to Sæter. The station is served by lines 13 and 19, using both SL79 and SL95 trams.

Preceding station	Trams in Oslo	Following station
Jomfrubråten towards Bekkestua	Line 13	Holtet towards Ljabru
Jomfrubråten towards Majorstuen	Line 19	Holtet towards Ljabru
