= Jomfrubråten tram stop =

Tram stop in Oslo, Norway

Jomfrubråten
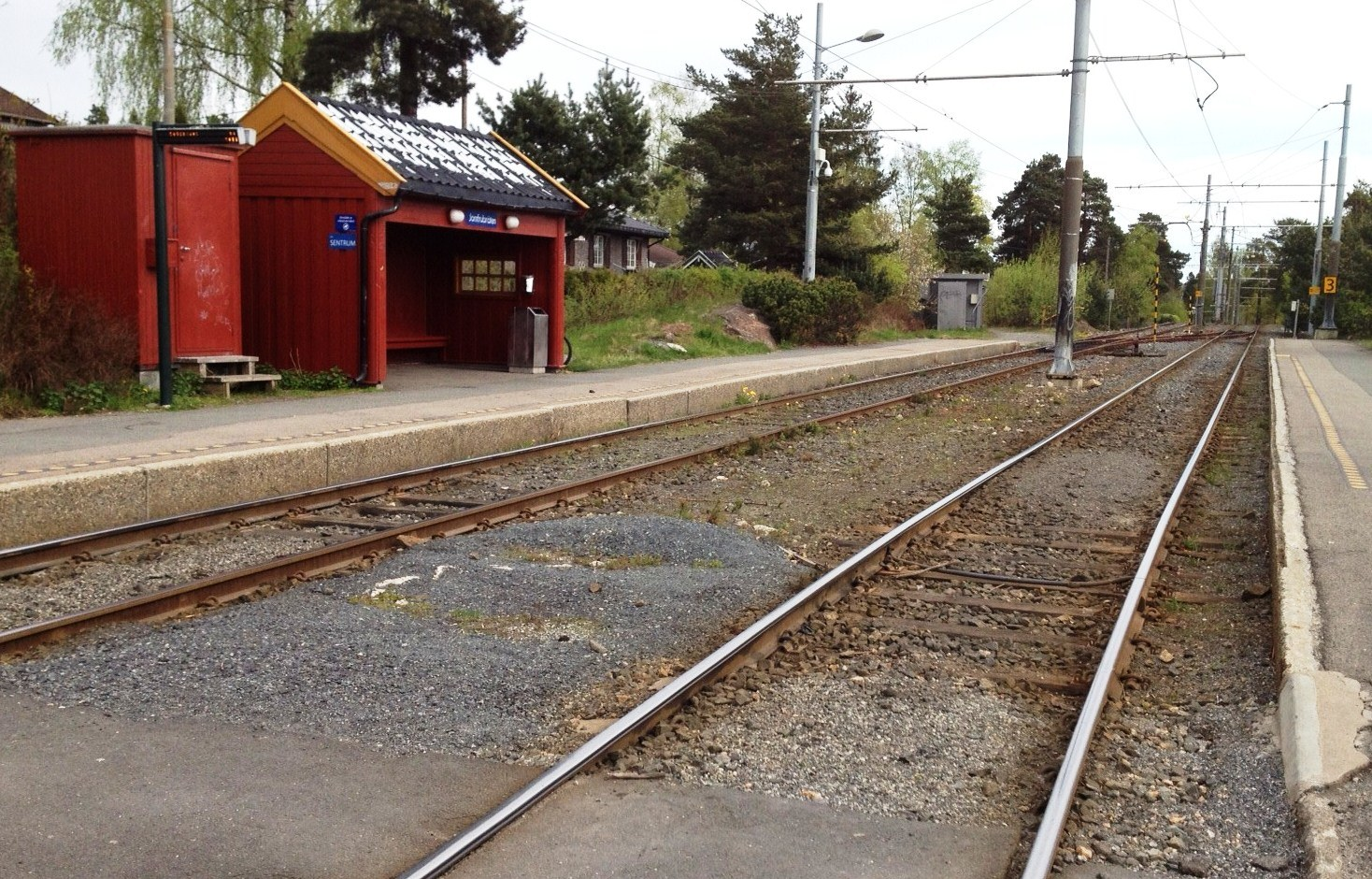

General information
- Location: Ekeberg, Nordstrand, Oslo; Norway
- Coordinates: 59.8883°N 10.7706°E
- Line: Ekeberg Line

History
- Opened: 11 June 1917
Location

Jomfrubråten is a light rail tram stop on the Ekeberg Line of the Oslo Tramway. It is located near Jomfrubråten in Ekeberg, in the borough of Nordstrand, in Oslo, Norway.

The station opened on 11 June 1917 as part of the Ekeberg Line to Sæter. The station is served by lines 13 and 19, using both SL79 and SL95 trams.

From 30 September 1931 to 29 October 1967, the Simensbråten Line split from the Ekeberg Line after Jomfrubråten. The next station along the Simensbråten Line was the old Ekebergparken.

Preceding station	Trams in Oslo	Following station
Ekebergparken towards Bekkestua	Line 13	Sportsplassen One-way operation
Ekebergparken towards Majorstuen	Line 19	Sportsplassen One-way operation
