= Ljabru =

Neighborhood in Oslo, Norway

Coordinates: 59°51′07″N 10°48′09″E

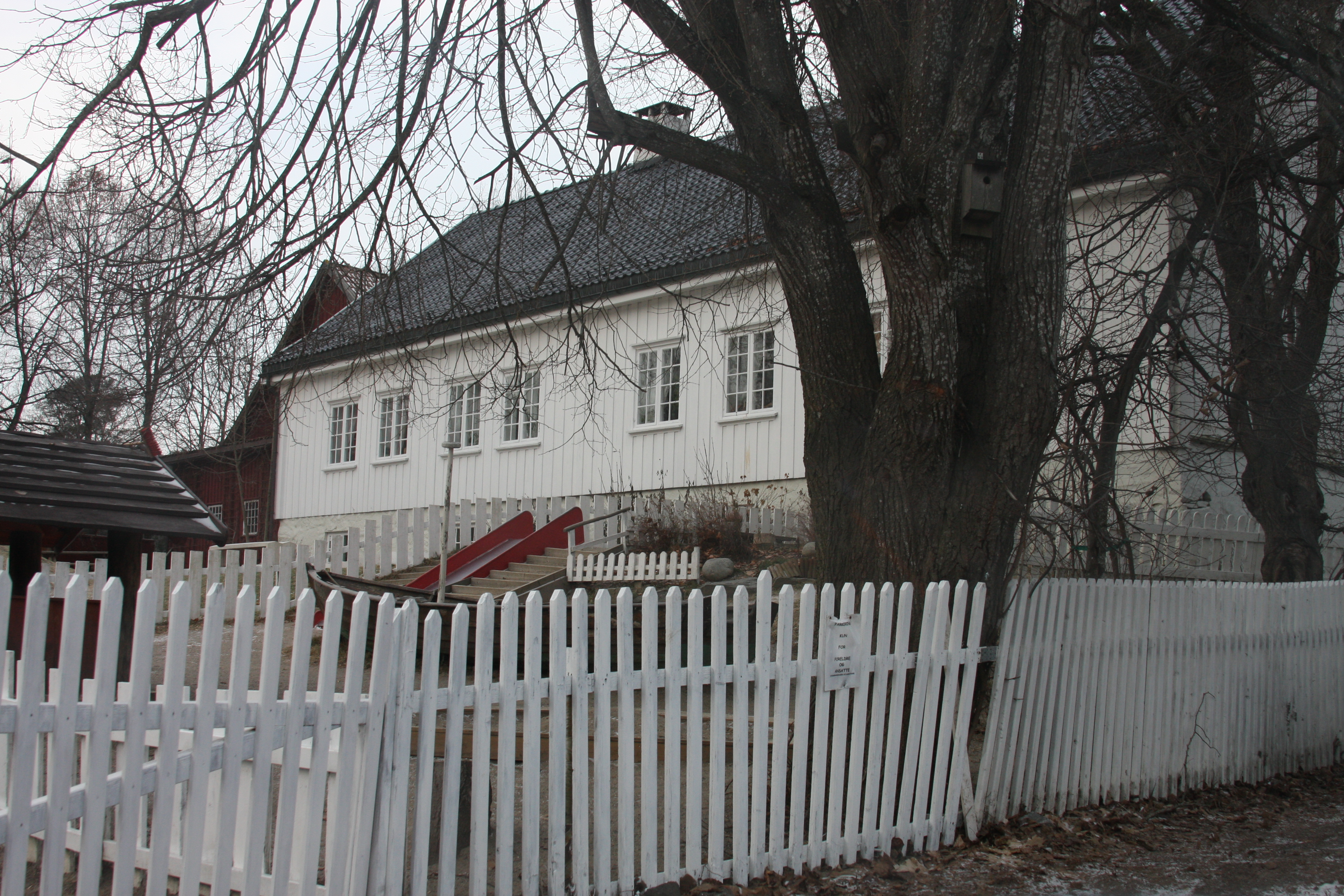
Ljabru hovedgaard (Ljabru manor), Oslo, Norway.

Ljabru is a hill and neighborhood in the borough of Nordstrand in Oslo, Norway.

It is mainly a residential area with detached housing as well as larger blocks. It is served by the Ekeberg Line terminal station Ljabru. It is located south of Nordstrand, east of Ljan, west of Mortensrud and north of Hauketo.

== Toponymy ==
The neighbourhood is named after an old farm – Old Norse Ljarnarbrú. The first element is the genitive of an old rivername Ljǫrn, the last element is brú 'bridge'.
