= Ekeberg Line =

Light rail line, part of Oslo Tramway

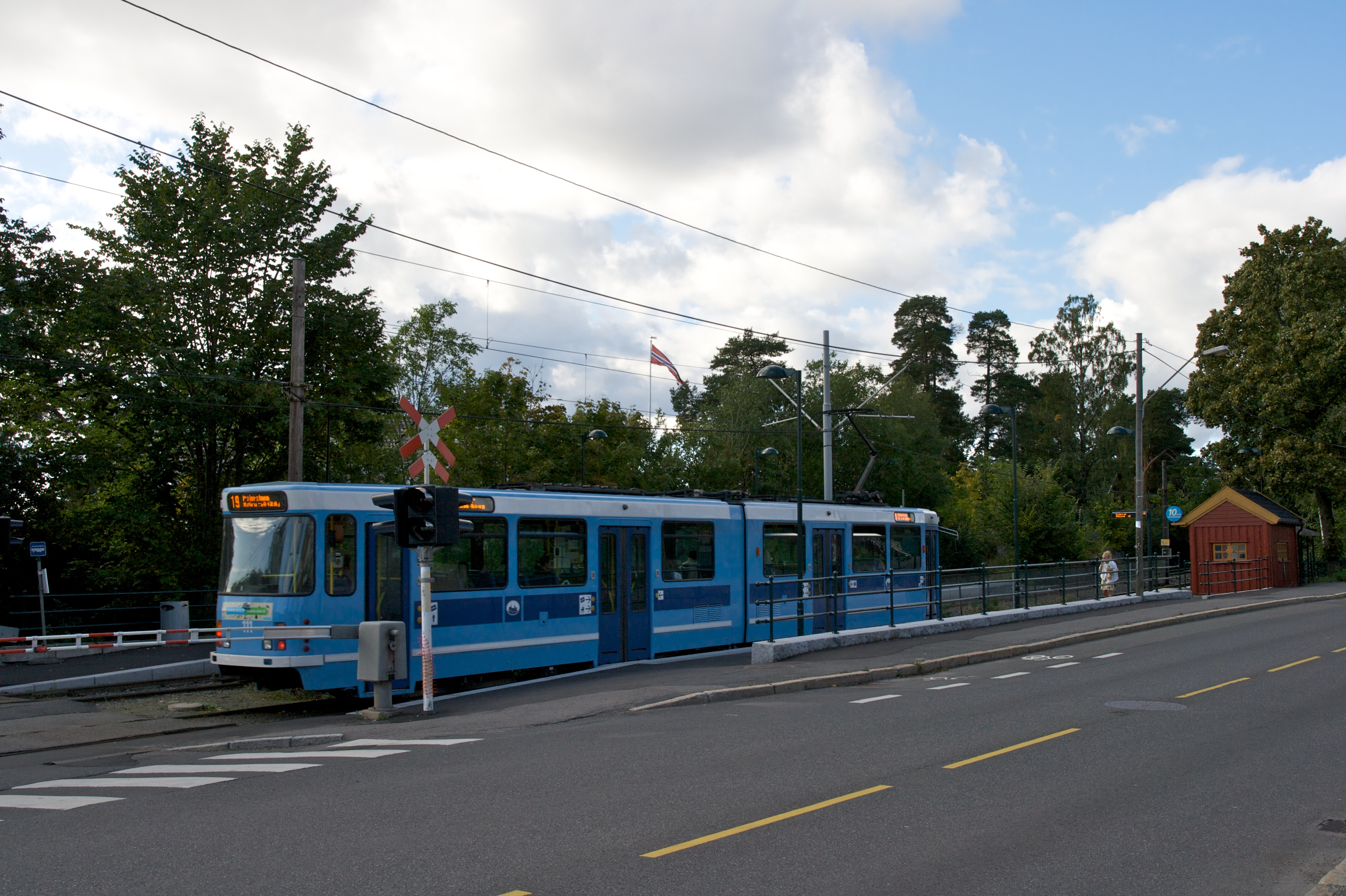
- SL79 tram at Kastellet

Overview
- Native name: Ekebergbanen
- Status: Operating
- Owner: Sporveien
- Locale: Oslo, Norway
- Termini: Oslo Hospital; Ljabru

Service
- Type: Tramway
- System: Oslo Tramway
- Operator(s): Sporveien Trikken
- Rolling stock: SL79; SL95

History
- Opened: 11 June 1917

Technical
- Line length: 6.6 km (4.1 mi)
- Number of tracks: Double track
- Track gauge: 1,435 mm (4 ft 8 1/2 in) standard gauge
- Electrification: 750 V DC overhead line
- Operating speed: 70 km/h (43 mph)
- Highest elevation: 117.8 m (386 ft)

The Ekeberg Line (Norwegian: Ekebergbanen) is a 6.6-kilometre (4.1 mi) long light rail line of the Oslo Tramway which runs from Oslo Hospital to Ljabru in Oslo, Norway. Operated by lines 13 and 19, it serves the area of Nordstrand and the neighborhoods of Ekeberg, Jomfrubråten, Bekkelaget and Ljan. The line is operated by Oslo Sporvognsdrift using SL79 and SL95 trams on contract with Ruter. The line itself is owned by Sporveien. At Oslo Hospital, the line connects to the Bjørvika Line, which runs to the city center.

Proposals for a line in the area were first launched 1897, but not until 1914 were the necessary permits granted. The line was built and operated by Ekebergbanen. The line opened in 1917, and connected to the Gamleby Line to reach Stortorvet in the city center. The line differed from the street trams in that it ran in its own right of way and used 1,200 volt supply, unlike the 600 volts used in the streets. In the early 1930s, the line was rebuilt to double track and a branch, the Simensbråten Line, was built. The Ekeberg Line was extended to its current terminus in 1941. In 1948, the company was taken over by the municipal Oslo Sporveier and operations were integrated in 1965. The line was nearly closed in 1967 and 1973, but during the 1970s, the line received new rolling stock and a renovation. The Bjørvika Line replaced the Gamlebyen Line as the connection to the city center in 2020.

Future plans include an extension to Hauketo Station on the Østfold Line.

== Route ==
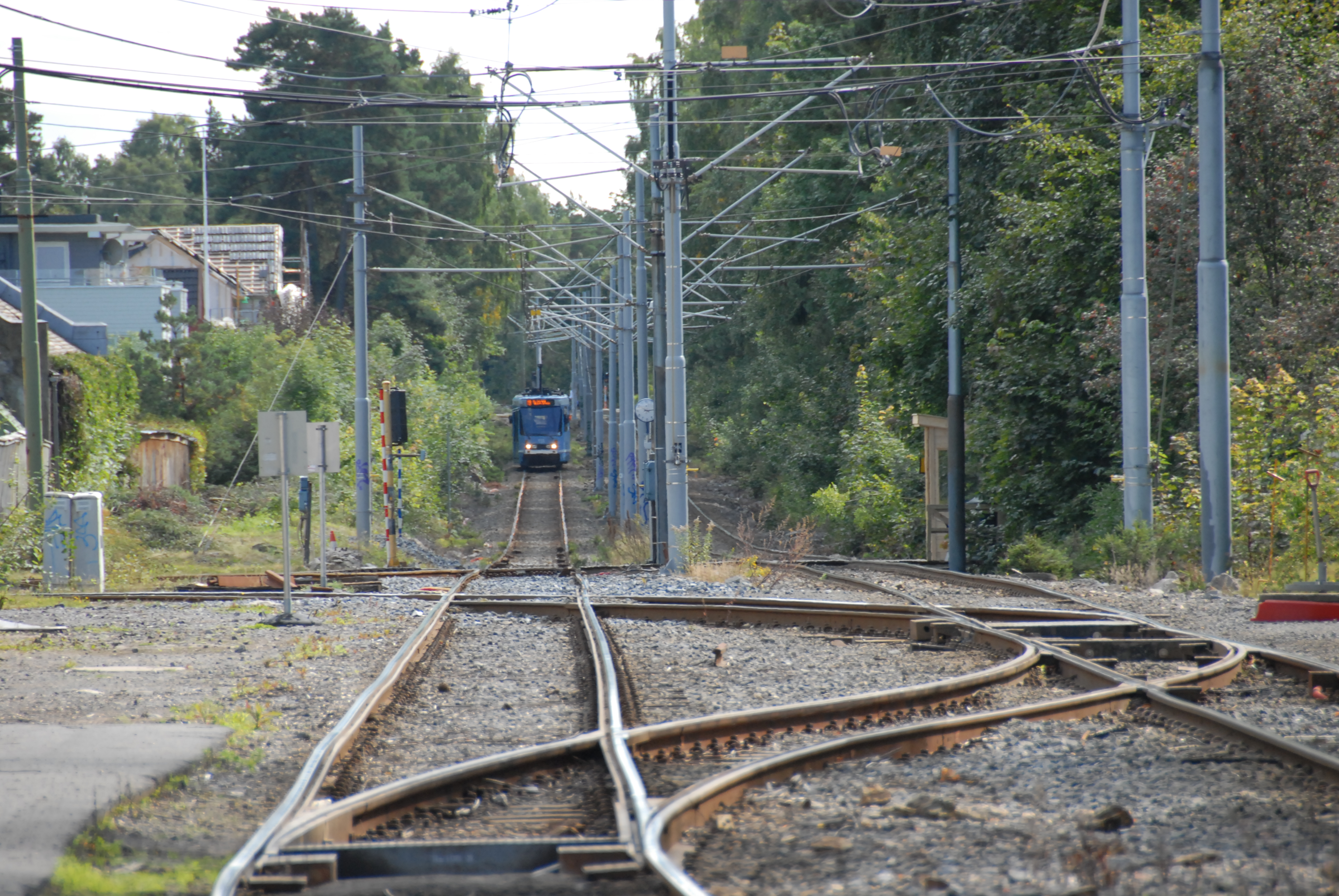
SL79 tram approaching Holtet

The Ekeberg Line is a 6.6-kilometer (4.1 mi) long continuation of the Gamleby Line, with which it connects at Oslo Hospital, located near sea level and 2.4 kilometers (1.5 mi) from Stortorvet, the traditional terminus in the city center. The entire line is built as a light rail with its own right-of-way. The line is electrified at 750 volts with overhead wires. It runs up Ekeberg on the east side of Kongsveien, passing Sjømannsskolen at 59.5 meters (195 ft) above mean sea level (AMSL) and 0.8 kilometers (0.50 mi) from Oslo Hospital. The next station is Jomfrubråten, which is located 2.0 kilometers (1.2 mi) from Oslo Hospital and at 115.0 meters (377 ft 4 in) AMSL. This is where the Simensbråten Line previously branched off. Past Jomfrubråten, the Simenbråten Line, while it existed, ran under the Ekeberg Line.

The next station is Sportsplassen, located 400 meters (1,300 ft) further south, at 108.9 meters (357 ft) AMSL, followed by Holtet, which is 3.2 kilometers (2.0 mi) from Oslo Hospital and at 115.5 meters (379 ft) AMSL. Holtet is the location of the depot and a balloon loop. At Holtet, the line crosses Kongsveien and continues along the west side of Ekebergveien. The next station is Sørli, which is located 4.0 kilometers (2.5 mi) from Oslo Hospital and at 111.7 meters (366 ft) AMSL, followed by Kastellet located 4.4 kilometers (2.7 mi) from Oslo Hospital and at 112.0 meters (367 ft 5 in) AMSL. The line continues past Bråten, located 4.9 kilometers (3.0 mi) from Oslo Hospital and at 117.6 meters (386 ft) AMSL and past Sæter, located 5.6 kilometers (3.5 mi) from Oslo Hospital and at 116.0 meters (380 ft 7 in) AMSL. Between Sæter and Ljabru is a bridge over Nordstrandsveien which is single tracked. Ljabru is the terminus and is located 7.6 kilometers (4.7 mi) from Oslo Hospital and at 100.0 meters (328 ft 1 in) AMSL.

== Service ==
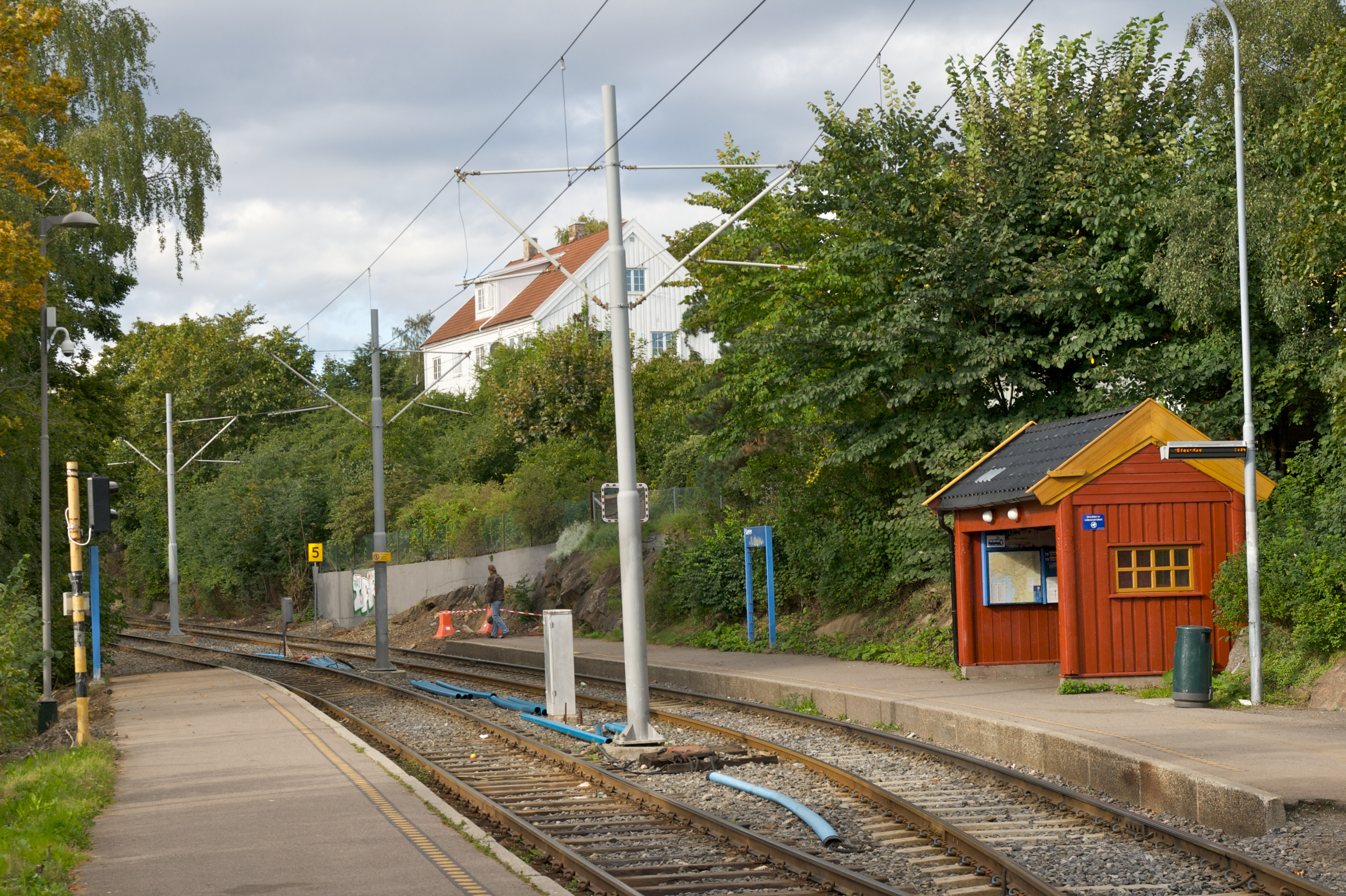
Sæter Station

The Ekeberg Line is served by lines 13 and 19 of the Oslo Tramway. Line 13 connects via the city center to the Lilleaker Line while Line 19 runs onwards along the Homansbyen Line. Travel time from Ljabru to Holtet is 7 minutes, to Oslo Hospital is 14 minutes and to Jernbanetoget is 20 minutes. Both of the lines run every 10 minutes during the day, every 20 minutes during the evenings and part of the weekends and every 30 minutes during early mornings on weekends. This gives a peak service of every 5 minutes along the Ekeberg Line. The service is provided using high-floor SL79 and low-floor SL95 trams. Line 13 run alternate departures along the full route to Bekkestua where the lack of a balloon loop mandates the use of SL95 trams, and shortened services to Lilleaker where the SL79 can be turned. Both SL79 and SL95 are used in Line 19; the most common is SL79.

== History ==
=== Construction ===
The Nordstrand area of Aker was first served by steam ships from the 1860s, which connected the lower areas to Oslo. In 1879, the Østfold Line (then the Smaalen Line) opened in 1879, giving these areas a regular service unaffected by the weather. In 1897, a public meeting was held regarding transport in the upper parts of Nordstand, the Ekeberg area. On 15 March 1899, Solicitor Einar Borgen, Engineer A. J. Jackwitz and Robert Iversen sent an application to build an electric railway from Oslo to Ljan. They were later supplemented with Contractor S. Sørensen. The application was considered in Aker Municipal Council on 14 March 1901, and placed on hold. It was again considered a year later, this time it was placed on hold because the politicians wanted to see how the new Railway Act would affect the plans.

A new application for the same route was made on 16 April 1907, this time from Solicitor H. M. Helliesen, Wholesaler A. Thune-Larsen, and Works Manager T. Poppe of Kristiania Sporveisselskab (KSS), the company which operated one the city tramways. This time the plans were slightly changed, with the route proposed built with a tramway rather than as a railway. In particular, the line was to connect to the Gamleby Line (then called the Oslo Line) of KSS's network and run up Ekeberg to an intersection between Ekeberveien and Kirkeveien. The plans called for a regular street tram with regular city tram vehicles. At the time, the city limits of Oslo went at Sjømannskolen. The application for the part within Oslo was sent to the city, while for the section outside the city, the application was sent to the Ministry of Labour. Within Oslo, a new line would only have to be built from Oslo Hospital to Sjømannskolen, while from Oslo Hospital to the city center, the line would follow the Gamleby Line.

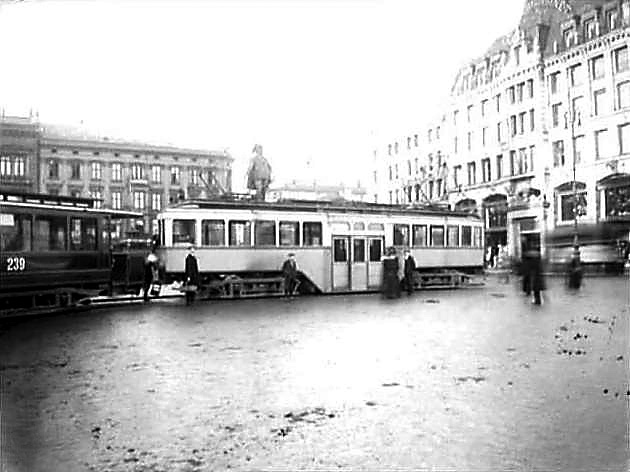
Ekeberg trams at Stortorvet in the city center in 1918

The plans were sent from the ministry to the municipality, whose council passed the plans on 12 November 1908. Among the conditions were that within five years, the municipality could demand that the line be extended to either Ljabru or Ljan. The concession was again considered on 2 November 1911, and there it was decided that the concession would be removed if the line was not finished by the end of 1914. However, in November 1911, Oslo City Council postponed their permissions while the issue was again made subject to reports on the issue. The report suggested a different route, which ran via Lodalen and up Ekebergsletta at Ekeberg hovedgård. After negotiations, the city agreed to allow the line to follow Kongsveien.

The Labour Party rejected the line, stating that they did not want any transport that made it easier to live outside the municipal boundary, to keep tax money within the municipality. The final permission from Oslo City Council was granted after a vote with 49 to 35 in May 1913. Concession from the ministry was granted from Sjømannsskolen to Ljan on 7 October, and from Oslo Hospital to Sjømannsskolen on 11 December. On 5 June 1914, permission was granted where the concession was transferred from Thune-Larsen and Helliesen to the company Ekebergbanen, which was founded on 27 March 1914. The company received a share capital of NOK 850,000, later increased to 2.5 million. Engineer Jørgen Barth became the first director.

Since the application, there had been a technological development within tramways. Barth started working with the plans, and proposed that the line be built as a light rail in its own right-of-way, similar to that of the Holmenkollen Line and the Røa Line on the west side of town. This would allow higher speeds. The plans called for the line to run on the east side of Kongsvien until Holtet, after which it would cross the road and continue on the west side Ekebergveien, until it reached Nordstrandsveien. The end of the line would have a balloon loop. After the revised plans were approved by the authorities, construction started in August 1914. Most of the works were finished in 1917. The original line consisted of double track from Oslo Hospital to Sjømannsskolen, and single track from Sjømannsskolen to Sæter. Holtet received a passing loop, in addition to the line's depot. The parish hall at Sæter was bought and made a combined station and office.

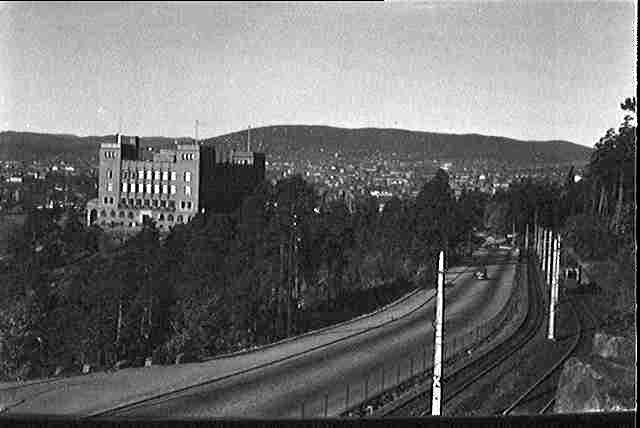
The Ekeberg Line at Sjømannsskolen in 1937

=== Early years ===
The company bought five bogie trams. They had pointed ends to ease meeting the shorter trams in the city, and had a low-floor center section, with internal steps. The body and mechanical equipment was built by Skabo Jernbanevognfabrikk, while the electrical components were built by Siemens-Schuckertwerke. Capacity was for 40 or 38 seated passengers. In early 1917, Barth was replaced by H. A. Mørk as director. Trial runs of the tramway started on 11 June 1917. It was retrospectively decided by the ministry that the official opening date was 1 July.

Initially there were two services per hour, but this quickly turned out to be too little. However, because of World War I and problems receiving supplies from Germany, it was not until November that all five trams were delivered and a 15-minute headway could be introduced. The company also started purchasing land to allow a future double track and widening of the loading gauge to allow for the wide trams used on the Holmenkollen Line. Also four services per hour proved to be too little. The company had chosen to electrify the line at 1,200 volts instead of the 600 volts used in the rest of the tram network, so the company could not operate rented trams from other operators. The junction between the two networks at Oslo Hospital had a 10-meter (33 ft) section without overhead wires. This allowed both of the pantographs to not touch their wire when the current was switched. When changing between the currents, the lighting, heating, compressor and battery chargers all had to be manually changed with a switch.

In 1919, the company ordered seven new trams from Skabo, with electric equipment from Norsk Elektrisk & Brown Boveri (NEBB). These were the first in the country to have Norwegian-built electrical equipment, and also allowed for multiple-unit train control. They were delivered in 1920 and 1921. In addition, six trailers were built from Hannoversche Waggonfabrik (HaWA) The delivery of new rolling stock required a new depot building at Holtet, two new electric arc transformers and a ticket price increase. The HaWa trailers were delivered in 1925. However, the two-axled trailers did not give as smooth a ride, and in 1927 the company ordered bogie trailers from Atelier Métallurgique de Nivelles, which were put into service in 1928 and 1929.

To allow more frequent services, the line needed to be rebuilt to double track. The first section was from Sportsplassen to Holtet, which opened with double track on 16 January 1930. Next followed the section from Holtet to Kastellet on 12 February 1931, and finally from Sjømannsskolen to Sportsplassen on 30 September 1931. This occurred at the same time the Simensbråten Line was built, as a branch from Jomfrubråten to Simensbråten. Construction of the Simensbråten Line started in December 1928; and this resulted in the Ekeberg Line past Jomfrubråten being moved. Instead of following the street Kongsveien, it the line was moved to a higher elevation. The double-tracked Ekeberg Line was placed on the new line, while the single-tracked Simensbråten Line would follow the old route along Kongsveien. The Simensbråten Line would thus cross under the Ekeberg Line and then through a curve turn onto its right-of-way. The Simensbråten Line was completed in mid-1931 and was officially opened on 30 September 1931.

On the city section, the tracks had been gradually rebuilt to allow 2.5-meter (8 ft 2 in) wide and 15-meter (49 ft) long trams to run on the tramway, including the Gamleby Line. In 1930, tram 1003 was rebuilt to that width. It proved too heavy, and Ekebergbanen ordered new trams which were wider. When delivered, they were capable of hauling a 50-tonne (49-long-ton; 55-short-ton) tram up the hills at 50 kilometres per hour (31 mph).

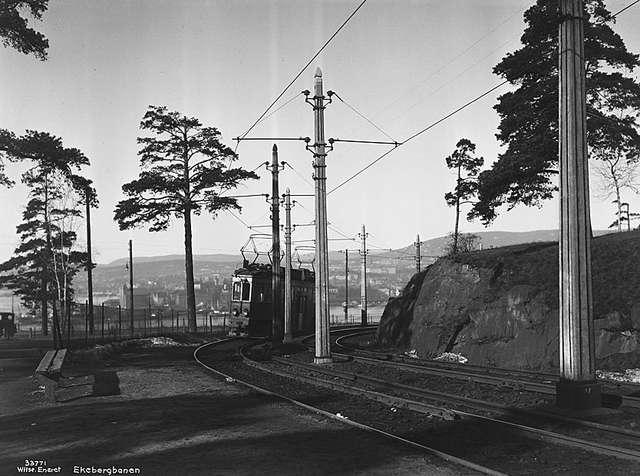
The Ekeberg Line in 1929

In 1925, the Østfold Line was rebuilt to double track, and the section past Hauketo was moved, including the demolishing of the Ljan Viaduct. In June 1926, Aker Municipality started the process to demand that the line be extended onwards from Sæter. However, Ekebergbanen stated that the rebuilding of the Østfold Line removed the need of the extension. The company instead applied for concession to extend the line 5 kilometres (3.1 mi) southwards towards Hvervenbukta on Ljanskollen's west side. This was rejected by Aker Municipality. In exchange for not being allowed to extend the line, Aker Municipality agreed to not press the issue of their preferred extension for the time being.

At the time, Akersbanerne was working on building the Lambertseter Line, which is located further east in Aker. This caused an uproar amongst the residents in the Ekeberg area, who wanted the Ekeberg Line extended, in what became known as the thousand meter, before the construction of the Lambertseter Line. The municipality therefore granted free municipal land and a grant of NOK 50,000 for expropriation. Construction started in July 1940, after having been delayed by the German occupation of Norway. The construction included a new double track from Holtet to Bråten. During the construction at Sæter, the trams turned at Bråten and backed to Sæter, where they used the turning loop. The thousand meter extension to Ljabru opened on 17 September 1941.

World War II and the limitations on fuel gave the Ekeberg Line a large increase in traffic, from four million passengers in 1939 to eight million in 1944. Unlike many other Norwegian tramways, the tram vehicles were not confiscated and moved to Germany, because no German tramways used both 1,200 volts and allowed 2.5-meter (8 ft 2 in) wide vehicles. A new depot building was built in 1942 and 1943, which allowed 3.2-meter (10 ft) wide trams.

Following the end of the war, it was decided that Oslo and Aker would merge. Ekebergbanen's concession lasted until 30 June 1947, which was initially extended on year. In March 1948, Oslo Sporveier, the municipal company that operated among other things the street tramways, offered to purchase Ekebergbanen. All but eight shares were sold, and from December the board of Ekebergbanen and Oslo Sporveier was identical. However, the company retained its own name, administration, rolling stock and personnel.

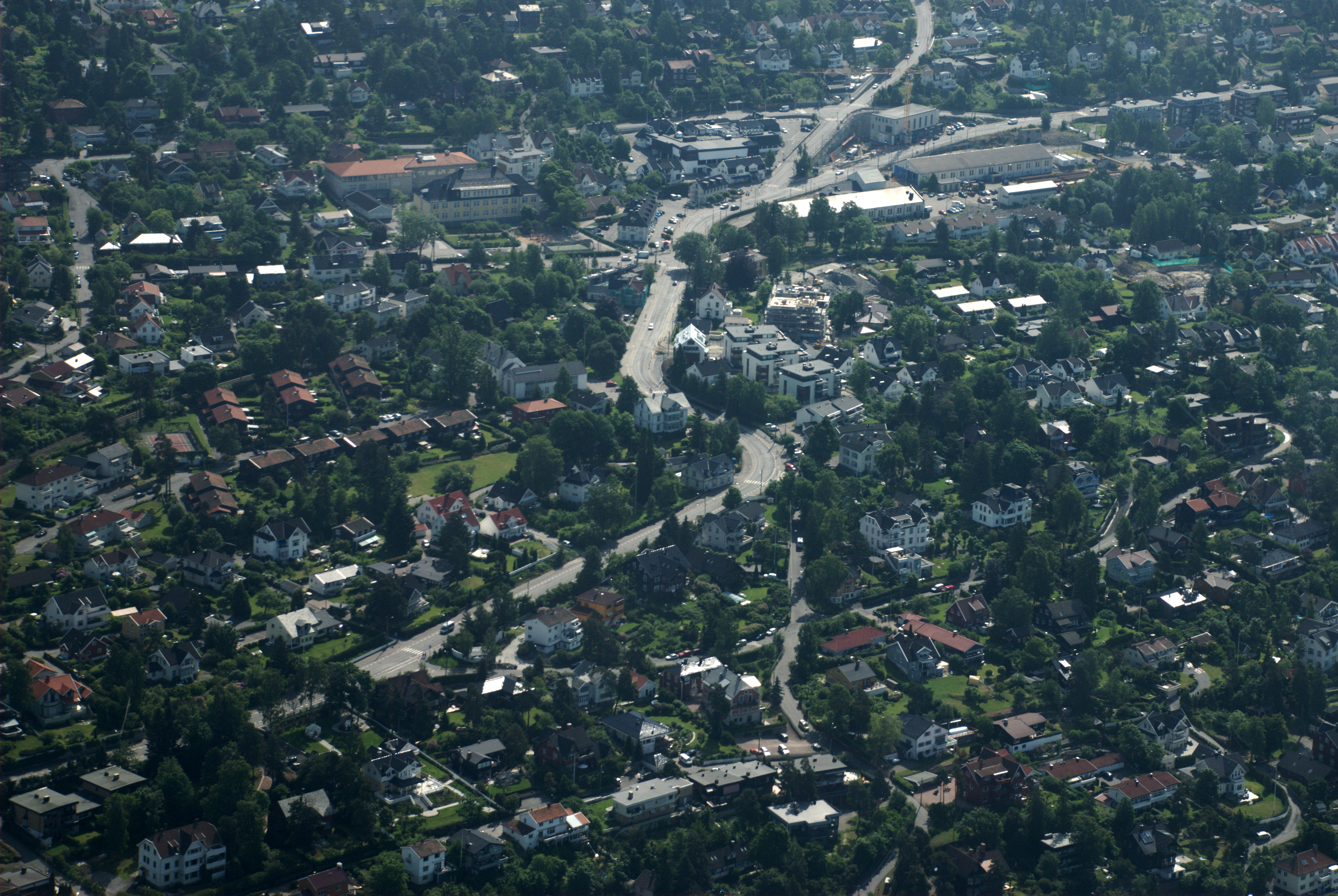
The Ekeberg Line runs through Holtet. At the top right of the image is the depot.

After the nationalization, the company started a renovation process of the infrastructure and rolling stock. Combined with a municipal policy of low fares, the company started going with a loss. Five new trams were delivered from 1948 to 1952, and built at the depot at Holtet, with used equipment from some of the older trams. An additional nine new trams were delivered between 1952 and 1955. Five additional trams were rebuilt from 1955 to 1960, by which time all the narrow trams had been rebuilt or retired. The use of a unique voltage gave operational difficulties, as fuses could regularly blow at Oslo Hospital if errors were made while switching from the one supply to the other. In addition, all the trams were custom-built with extra equipment with limited spare parts. All the trams delivered during the 1950s were built so they could later be converted to only use 600 volt supply. The depot was expanded in 1952.

=== Threat of closure and renewal ===
In 1960, the Oslo City Council voted to close the street tramway and replace all routes with either diesel buses or the Oslo Metro. The specific plans for the Ekeberg Line were not decided, although the line was considered either to be a stand-alone light rail or connected to the metro. From 30 October 1960, the route for the Ekeberg Line trams in the city changed, so they instead followed the route Schweigaards gate – Vognmannsgata – Jernbanetorget – Kirkeristen to Stortorvet instead of the old route via Grønland and Brugata. From 1963, the route terminated at Jernbanetorget, after the rest of the route was closed due to the construction of the metro.

From 1 July 1965, Oslo Sporveier took over the operation of the Ekeberg Line, which was numbered Line 16. Oslo Sporveier took over all employees and rolling stock, but Ekebergbanen remained a holding and real estate company. Immediately following the take-over, Oslo Sporveier introduced a 20-minute headway and suggested that the line be closed and replaced by buses from 29 October 1967, when the Østensjø Line of the metro opened. Following the closing of Sagene Ring, there were increased protests against closing the tramway. Traffic had decreased on the Ekeberg Line, but proponents for keeping it stated that this was because Oslo Sporveier had reduced the frequency and moved the end station out of the core of the city center. When the proposal to close the Ekeberg Line was considered by the city council, it was decided that only the Simenbråten Line was to be closed.

In 1960, the sale of cars in Norway was deregulated and the management of the public transport system was changed to become that of providing services to those who could not drive their own car. The Ekeberg Line lost traffic because it did not operate to the city center, and with the 1960 decision in the city council was it not permissible to lay new tracks to Stortorvet. Therefore, locals suggested that the trams continue along the track from Jernbanetorget to Skøyen, on the west side of town. At first the proposal was rejected by Oslo Sporveier because it was "technically impossible".

From June 1967, Line 9, that ran along the Lilleaker Line via the Skøyen Line to the city center and onwards along the Østensjø Line, was truncated to Jernbanetorget, as the Østensjø was converted to a metro line. Calculations showed that if the Lilleaker Line or the Skøyen Line and the Ekeberg Line were connected, between them one tram less would be needed, and the Ekeberg Line would have a service through the city center. After trial runs, the new service to Skøyen was taken into use on 4 May 1969.

In 1973, Oslo Sporveier again proposed closing the Ekeberg Line. This time the reason was the construction of the Oslo Tunnel and Oslo Central Station, which would involve construction work around Jernbanetorget. This proposal also resulted in a public reactions, and the same arguments from the mid-1960s were repeated. Again the suggestion to link the Lilleaker Line to the Ekeberg Line were launched. Oslo Sporveier calculated it would cost NOK 3.6 million for investments, including rebuilding 20 Gullfisk trams, new rectifiers and new tracks. This was less than the necessary 30 buses needed for conversion to bus services.

The last of the older Ekeberg Line trams to Skøyen ran on 5 August 1973. From the following day, all trams turned at a new balloon loop at Vognmannsgata. Investments included a new track at Holtet Depot, and 500 meters (1,600 ft) of new double track in its own right-of-way along Biskop Gunnerus gate from Postgirobygget to Kirkeristen. A double track from Sæter to Ljabru was discarded because there was no need for it. The last of the old trams ran on 22 September, and from 24 September the line was switched from 1,200 to 600 volts. Ordinary service with Gullfisk trams from Ljabru to Jar on the Lilleaker Line started on 29 September. The new service involved a 10-minute headway at daytime and a 20-minute headway during the evenings.

In 1976, a Gullfisk lost control on the line and derailed near Sjømansskolen, causing the tram to be scrapped. From 1977, Oslo Sporveier also put SM53 trams into service. This was not sufficient, and Oslo Sporveier considered introducing the old Ekeberg Line trams. But this would be costly, as the vehicles would have to be upgraded. Instead, used MBG trams from the Gothenburg Tramway were put into service. The section from Sæter to Ljabru had since the opening had a signaling system that had worked fine with 15- and 20-minute headways, but did not work properly with 10-minute routes. A new system was installed, and proved to work just as poorly as the old system. During 1979, the section was rebuilt to double track, although the short bridge over Nordstrandsveien was kept single tracked.

In 1982 and 1983, the SL79 articulated trams were introduced on the line. In 1988, the line to Jar was supplemented with a rush-hour route which connected with the Ullevål Hageby Line west of Oslo. From 28 August 1988, a service started running from Ljabru and connecting with the Ullevål Hageby Line. Weekend night services started operating from 18 November 1989. From 1988 to 1991, the section of the Gamleby Line along Schweigaards gate was rebuilt to light rail standard in its own right-of-way. In this period, the line received new catenary and many stations were renovated. The new section was taken into use on 4 January 1991. Along with the rest of the tram system the voltage was increased to 750 volts on 4 June 2000. This allowed the new SL95 low-floor trams to operate on the line. In 2002 the board of Oslo Sporveier proposed closing the Ekeberg Line along with the Kjelsås Line, but this was stopped by the general assembly.

As part of the Fjord City and redevelopment of Bjørvika, the Ekeberg Line was connected to the new Bjørvika Line on the south side of Oslo Central Station to Jernbanetorget, with stops at Bjørvika and Middelalderparken. As an alternative. It was proposed that the tracks along Schweigaards gate be kept and that the trams along the Ekeberg Line alternate running via Bjørvika and Schweigaards gate. However, the Gamlebyen Line over Grønland was closed upon the opening of the new line in 2020.

== Future ==
The Ekeberg Line is proposed extended from Ljabru to Hauketo Station on the Østfold Line. Two routes have been proposed, either along Ekebergveien, or in a tunnel further east. The extension will allow better correspondence southwards, including transfer to the Oslo Commuter Rail and Ruter buses. Financing has been secured through Oslo Package 3.

Upgrades on the southernmost part of the line will take place during 2014 that will shorten journey times. The single track bridge between Sæter and Ljabru over Nordstrandveien will be demolished and replaced with a new double track bridge. In addition, two curves on the line will be straightened out.

== Bibliography ==
- Andersen, Bjørn (1992). Ekebergbanen 75 år; (in Norwegian). Oslo: Lokaltrafikkhistorisk Forening. ISBN 82-91223-00-9.
- Bjerke, Thor; Holom, Finn (2004). Banedata 2004 (in Norwegian). Oslo / Hamar: Norsk Jernbaneklubb / Norsk Jernbanemuseum. ISBN 82-90286-28-7.
