= Nordstrand Vel =

Neighbourhood service organisation in Nordstrand, Oslo

Nordstrand Vel is a neighbourhood service organisation (Norwegian: Velforening) in the borough of Nordstrand in Oslo. It is one of the largest and oldest such organisations in Norway.

The group has approximately 1,900 members, making it one of the largest service organisations in Norway. Founded on 24 March 1892, it is also one of the oldest.

Nordstrand Vel is politically neutral. It focusses on the neighbourhood of Nordstrand, for example traffic safety, development, maintenance of the natural environment and human wellbeing. It has helped preserve the beaches, spoken out against new development which it sees as overbuilding and assisted the local environmental group Grønn Linje Aksjon Nordstrand. Recently it has worked on the planning for the Mosseveien tunnel, the Sæter local centre and the Nordstrand hillside. The organisation owns and operates the Nordstrandhus (Nordstrand House) and worked on renovating the Nordstrand Bad (baths), which it formerly owned.

Since 1998, the group has awarded an annual prize for environmental activity. In 2011, the group and member Johannes Løken shared the Oslo environmental prize for their work to eliminate oil heating in the area, including from the Nordstrandhus.
