= Kastellet tram stop =

Tram stop in Oslo, Norway

Kastellet
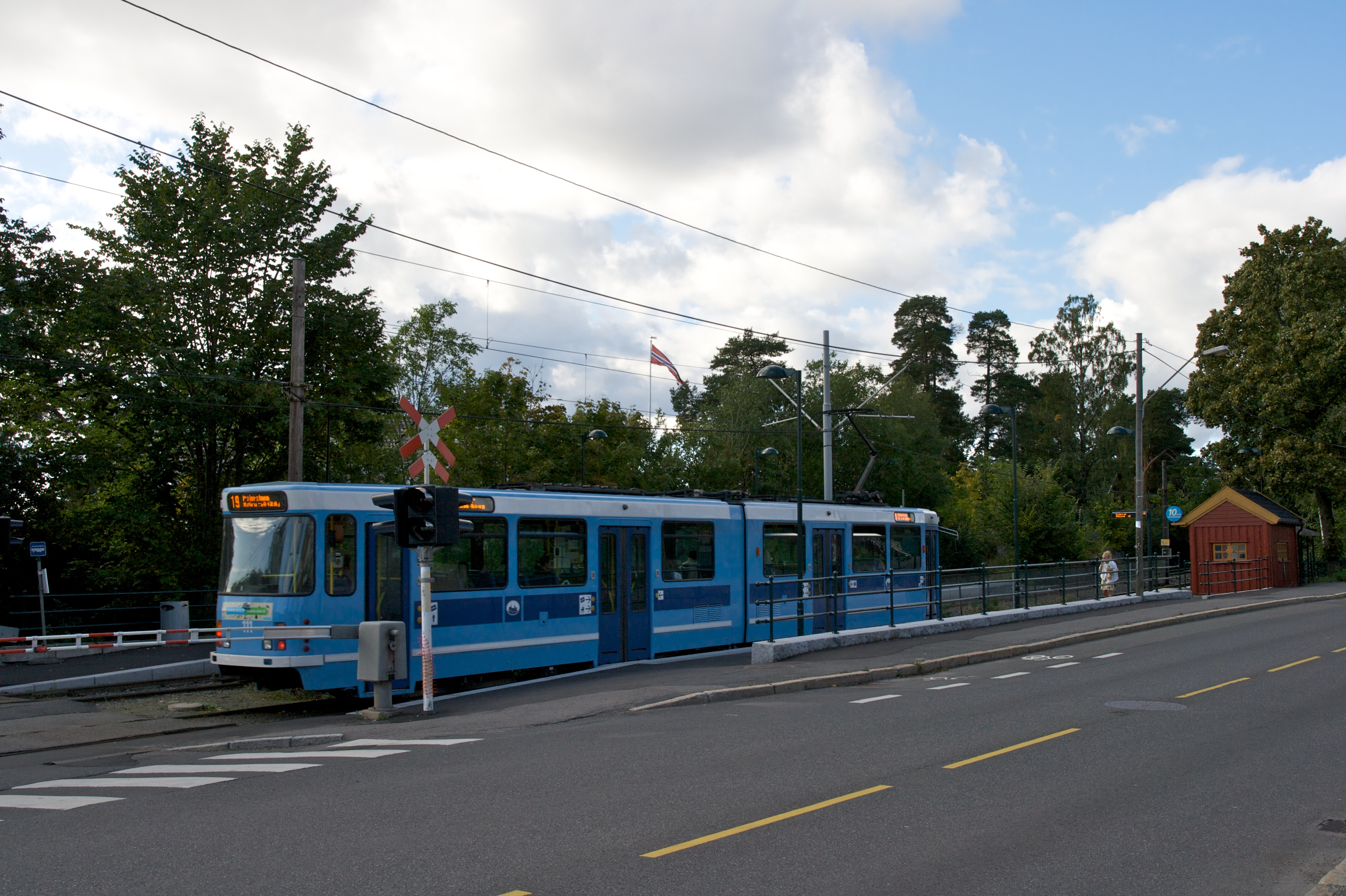

General information
- Location: Nordstrand, Oslo; Norway
- Coordinates: 59°52′15.83″N 10°47′25.28″E
- Line: Ekeberg Line

History
- Opened: 11 June 1917

Services
Preceding station	Trams in Oslo	Following station
Sørli towards Bekkestua	Line 13	Bråten towards Ljabru
Sørli towards Majorstuen	Line 19	Bråten towards Ljabru
Location

Kastellet is a light rail tram stop on the Oslo Tramway.

Located at Kastellet in Nordstrand, the station is situated between Sørli and Bråten. It was opened on 11 June 1917. It is served by lines 13 and 19 and is served by both SL79 and SL95 trams. There is also a bus stop which is served by routes 75A and 75B of Ruter's bus network. It is approximately 100 metres away from the tram stop. There is a shelter at the station, which was built in the 1990s, along with many other stations on the Ekeberg Line. It is a copy of Erik Glosimodt's original art nouveau style.
