= Sørli tram stop =

Light rail tram stop in Nordstrand, Oslo, Norway

Sørli
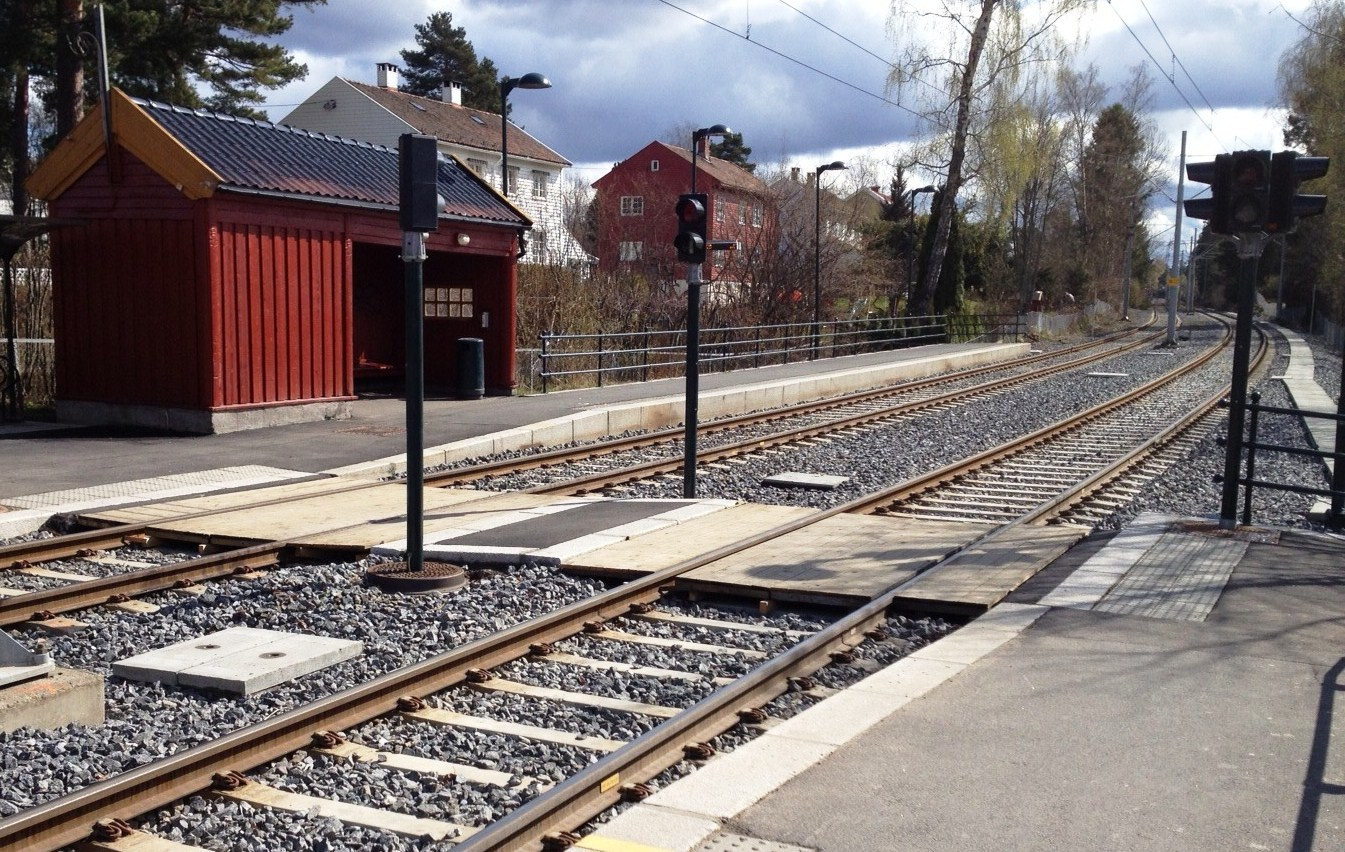

General information
- Location: Nordstrand, Oslo; Norway
- Coordinates: 59.87493°N 10.78709°E
- Line: Ekeberg Line

History
- Opened: 11 June 1917
Location

Sørli is a light rail tram stop on the Oslo Tramway.

Located at Sørli in Nordstrand, the station is situated between Holtet and Kastellet. It was opened on 11 June 1917. The station is served by lines 13 and 19.

Preceding station	Trams in Oslo	Following station
Holtet towards Bekkestua	Line 13	Kastellet towards Ljabru
Holtet towards Majorstuen	Line 19	Kastellet towards Ljabru
