= Ekebergsletta =

Field in Ekeberg, Oslo, Norway

Coordinates: 59°53′37″N 10°46′51″E

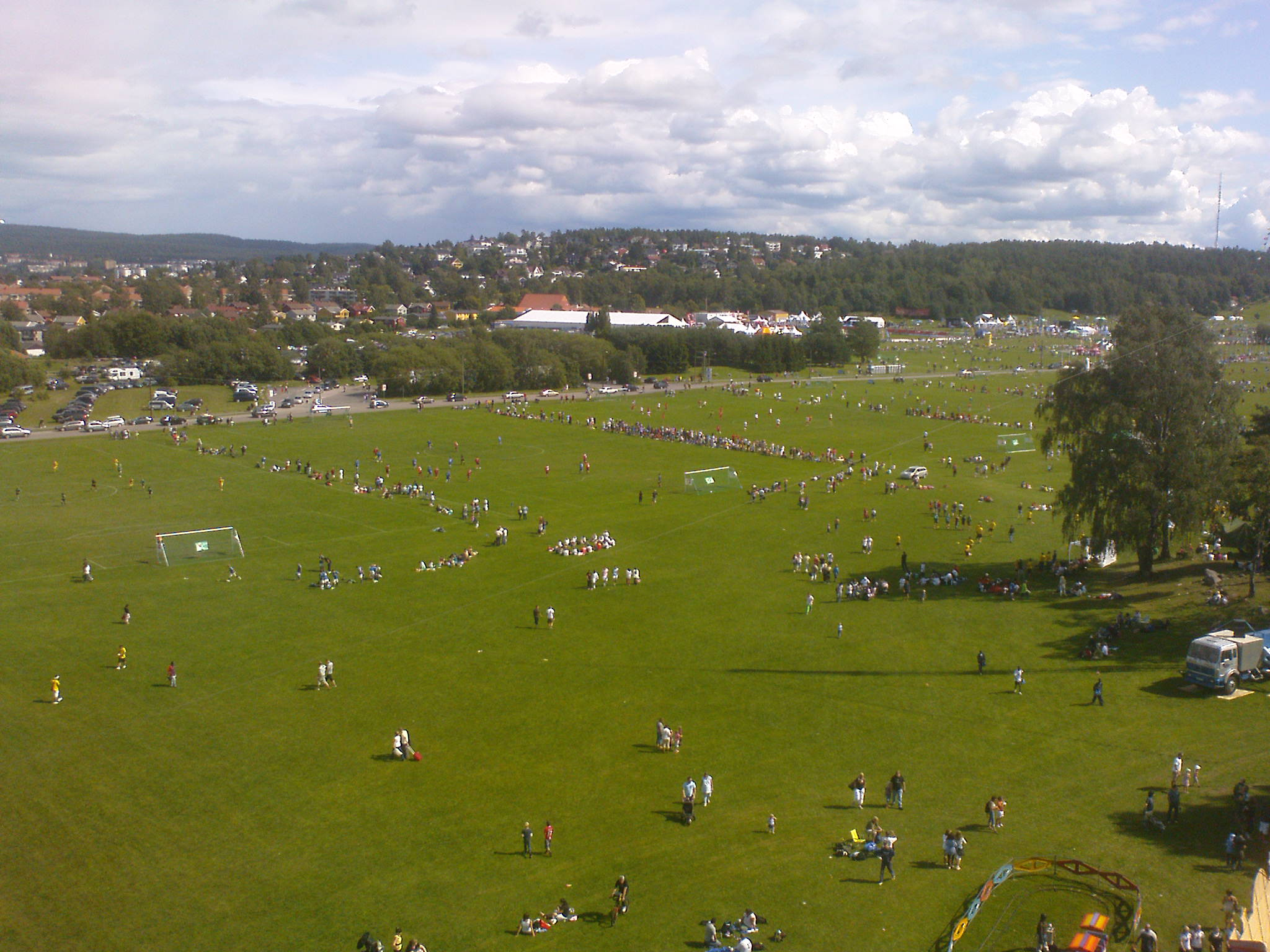
Ekebergsletta during the Norway Cup (2009)

Ekebergsletta is a field in the neighborhood of Ekeberg in the Nordstrand district, southeast of downtown Oslo, Norway.

Ekebergsletta is a large grass covered area located on Ekeberg plateau. Originally the area was farmland where crops were cultivated until the 1950s. Shortly after the end of World War II, the idea of an airport for Oslo was entertained for this area. Roald Amundsen had landed his Airship Norge here for a few hours in 1926 on his way to towards the North Pole. The foundation of the mooring mast used by the airship can still be found.

The idea of an airport was ultimately rejected in favor of an area for sports and related activities. Today Ekebergsletta is part of Oslo's biggest park system and is used primarily for sporting events. Ekebergsletta is commonly associated with the Norway Cup which started here in 1972 and which is still one of several places around Oslo where the game is held.

== See also ==
- Ekebergparken Sculpture Park
