= Norway Cup =

Youth football tournament

Coordinates: 59°53′50″N 10°46′38″E

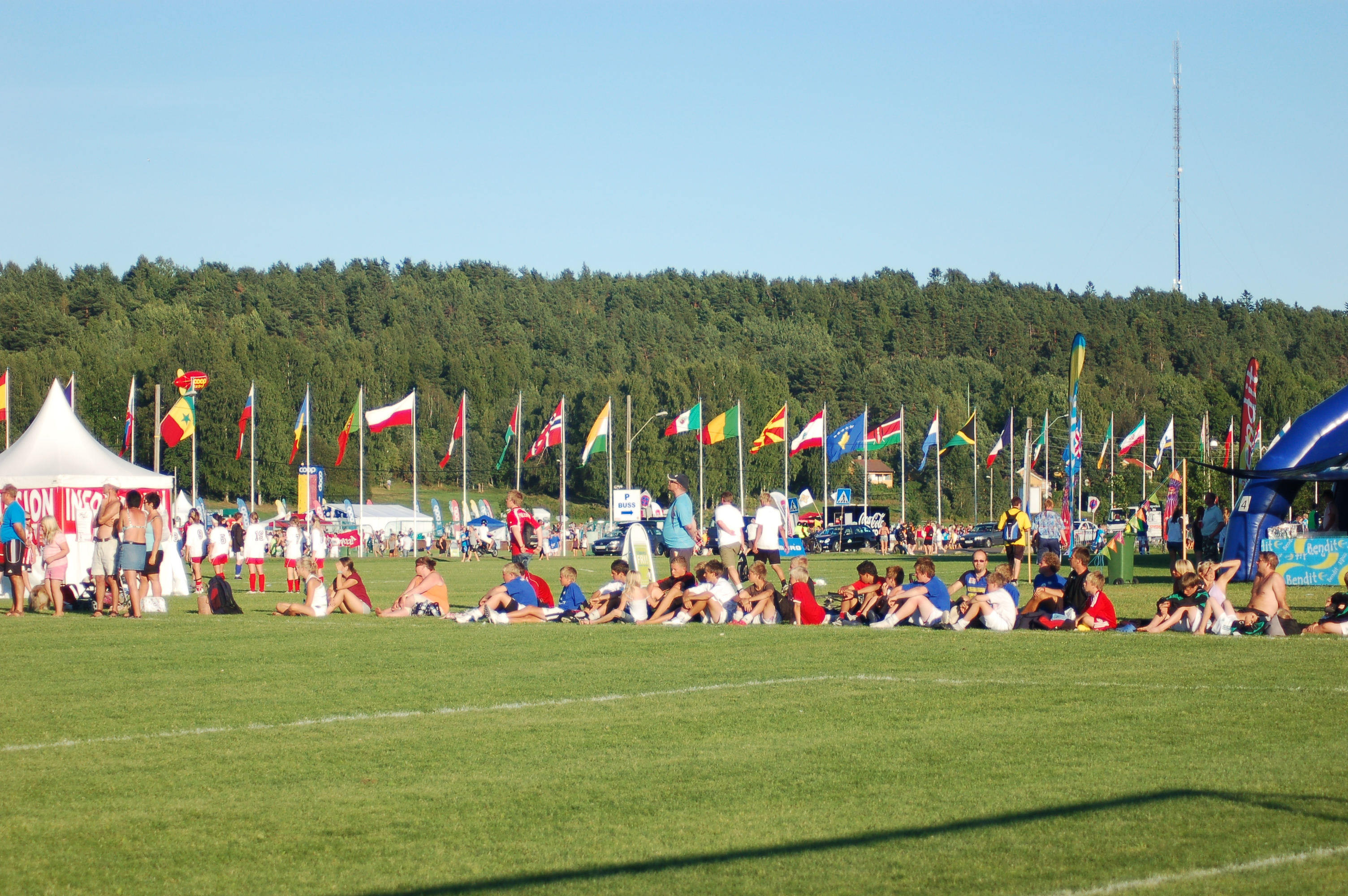
Norway Cup in 2008

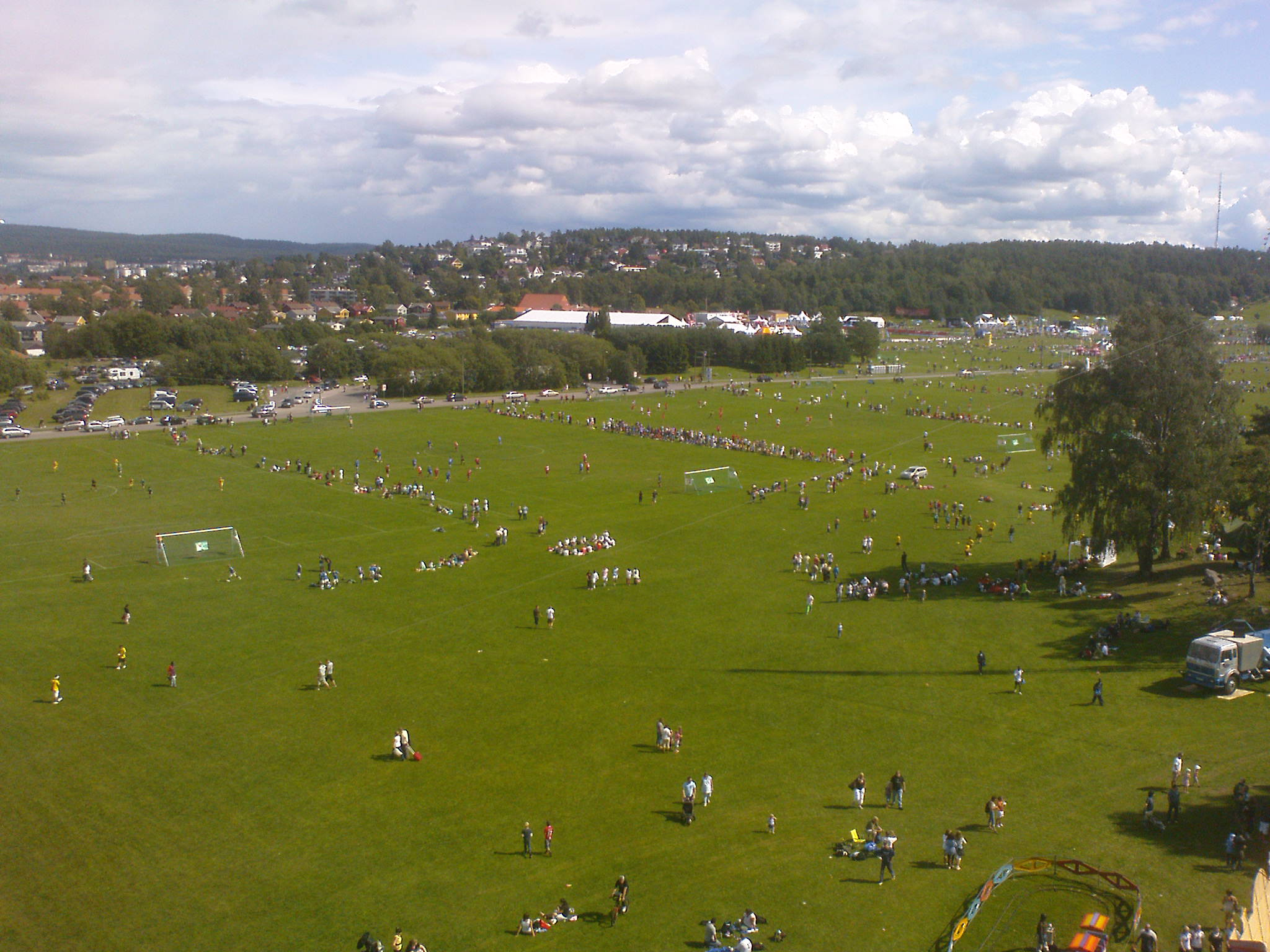
Norway Cup in 2009

The Norway Cup is an international youth football tournament in Oslo, Norway. It has been held annually since 1972, with the exception of 1976 (due to a conflicting arrangement), 2020 and 2021 (due to the COVID-19 pandemic). It is the world's largest football tournament and sees a typical 1400 to 1700 participating teams per year - in 2023 Norway Cup hit an all-time record with 2183 teams. . The Norway Cup consists of tournaments for ages 10 through 19 for both genders, with over 53,049 teams having participated during its history. The tournament takes place at Ekebergsletta.

The tournament is organized by Bækkelagets Sportsklub with Pål Trælvik as its general secretary. Participants come from 50 to 60 countries. Amazon Grimstad won the first Norway Cup tournament for women, winning 2–1 over Vestar, after a penalty shoot-out.

== The world's biggest tournament ==
From 1972 to 2016, 53,049 teams have participated in the tournament. In recent years around 1600–2200 teams participated each year and the tournament is therefore referred to often as "the world's biggest football tournament". The participants in the tournament come from 50–60 different nations. In 1972 the first edition of the Norway Cup played with women's teams, while the NFF did not recognize women's football officially until 1976. Amazon Grimstad Grimstad won the first Norway Cup for women. The team won 2–1 against IL Vestar after a penalty shootout.

Several players who have participated in the Norway Cup have subsequently made football their profession, including Erik Mykland, John Carew, Ole Gunnar Solskjær and Steffen Iversen.
