= Ekeberg =

Neighborhood in Oslo, Norway

Coordinates: 59°54′N 10°46′E

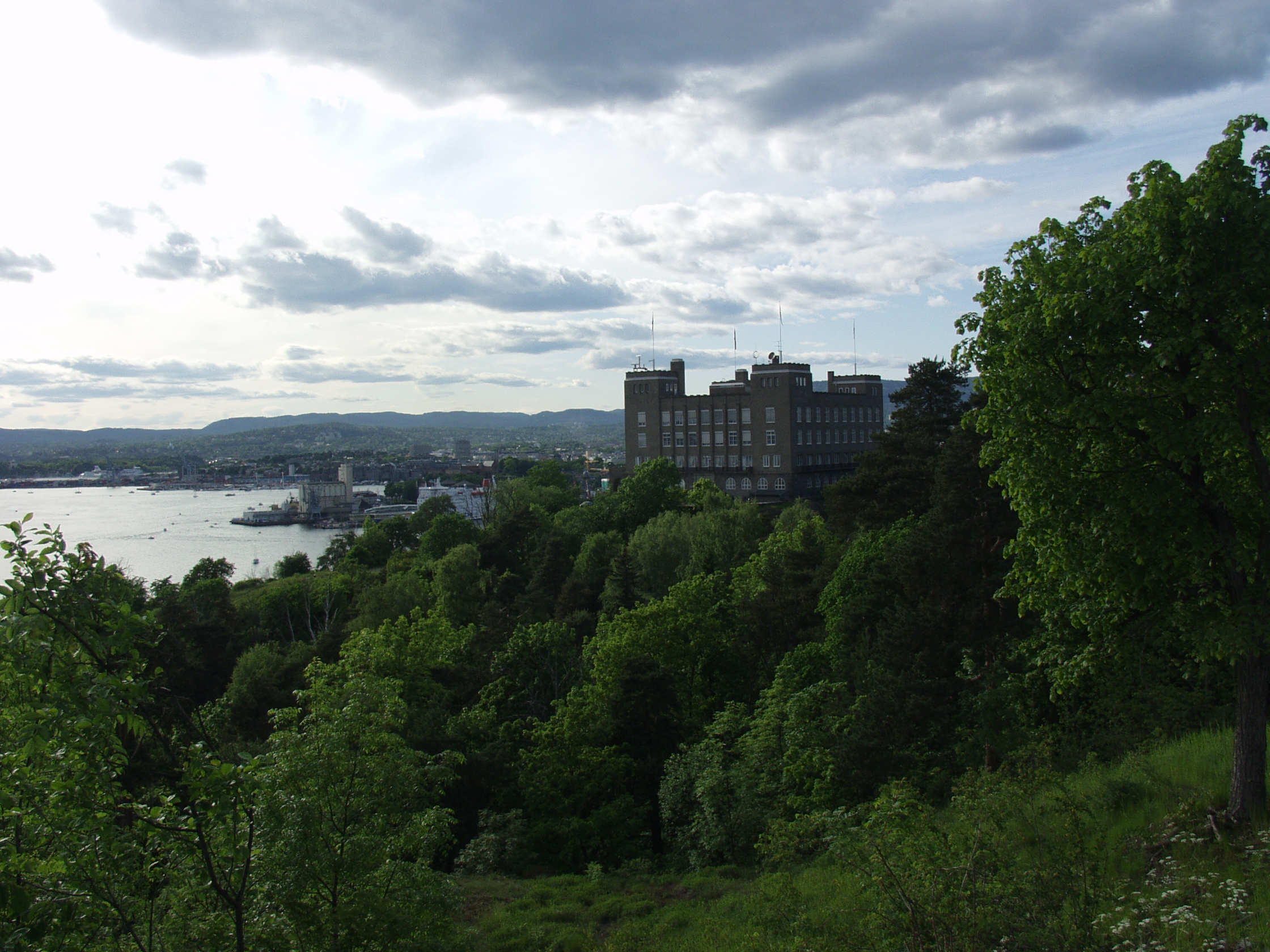
The former Seaman's school at Ekeberg

Ekeberg is a neighborhood in the city of Oslo, Norway. The Norway Cup soccer tournament takes place at Ekebergsletta every summer. "Sletta" means "the plain". The scene shown in the painting "The Scream" by Edvard Munch is Utsikten ("the view") in Ekeberg.

There are a number of Iron Age grave mounds and Bronze Age ritual sites in the Ekeberg area, making it one of Oslo's oldest inhabited places.

During the Middle Ages, Hovedøya Abbey had a large farm at Ekeberg; it was later taken by the crown. From 1760, the farm was run by an appointed owner, and his relatives owned the farm thereafter. A number of small homesteads under the main farm were erected in the following century. The first suburban settlers in the Ekeberg area came around 1900, and the early suburb was raised in the years prior to 1935. Many of the early houses are still present. Ekeberg belonged to Oslo from 1947.

In 1926 Roald Amundsen's airship Norge stopped in Oslo on its way from Italy to Svalbard. It was moored at Ekeberg at a specially-constructed mast, the foundation of which can still be seen today at the north end of the park.

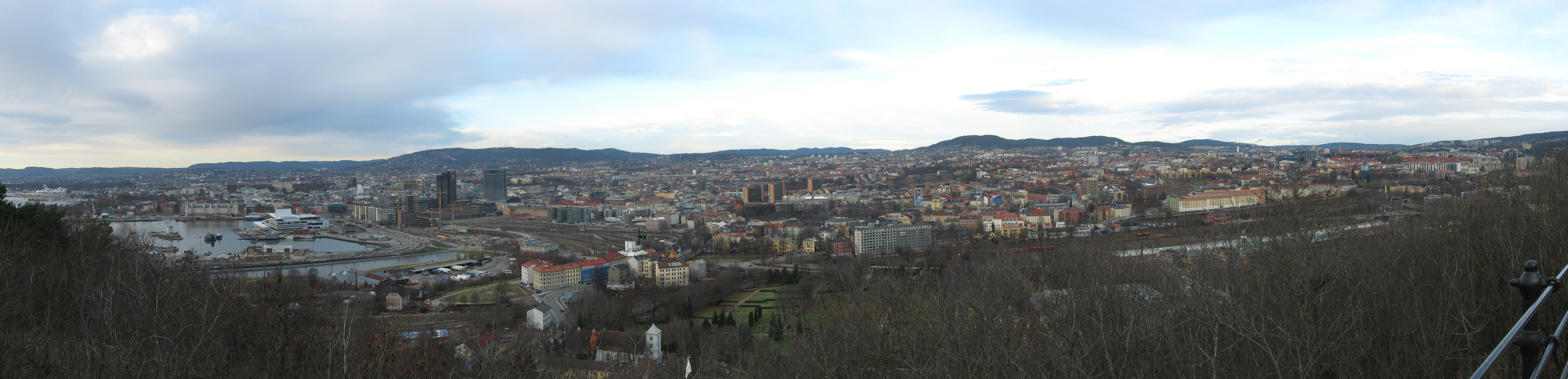
Panorama view of central Oslo from Valhallveien, near Ekebergsletta, Norway.

The farm land (Ekebergsletta) cultivated crops until 1950, and the farm still had goats and small cattle up to 1965. The neighborhood of Ekeberg is situated on a bluff overlooking the city. During the 19th century, the air was considered excellent for tuberculosis patients. Shortly after World War II, there were discussions on how to use the area, and the idea of an airport for Oslo was suggested. This was rejected, and the Labour party politician Rolf Hofmo, who had survived internment at the concentration camp of Sachsenhausen during the Second World War, proposed the idea of a free area for sport and other activities.

Ekeberg-Bekkelaget was a borough of Oslo up to January 1, 2004, when it became part of the Gamle Oslo and Nordstrand boroughs.

Ekeberg as a geographical area was mentioned by Snorri Sturluson in his Saga of the Kings. In the northern part of the area the farm "Ekeberg Hovedgård" is located. The fields of the farm are now a part of Ekebergsletta and the camp ground where the main building still stands.

The name: Old Norse Eikaberg - the first element is the genitive plural case of eik f 'oak', the last element is berg n 'mountain'.

Sculpture Park
A sculpture park, Ekebergparken Sculpture Park opened in 2013 on the initiative of the Norwegian businessman and multimillionaire Christian Ringnes. The park contains numerous works of art from Norwegian and international artists, among others, Salvador Dalí, Lynn Chadwick, Richard Hudson and Per Ung. The sculpture park is located in an area that has been open space and public park since the 1800s.

In literature Many Norwegian authors and poets have written poems and appraisals of the area. Among them Henrik Wergeland, Hans E. Kinck, and Peter Christen Asbjørnsen, who also wrote down the local folklore from the area, concerning the Ekeberg Troll, living inside the hill. Hans Christian Andersen and Bjørnstjerne Bjørnson apparently established their friendship while admiring the view of the city. Later, Ingeborg Refling Hagen lived in the area, establishing a cultural work which was known as the Ekeberg Colony.

A curious mentioning of the area occurs in the cult novel The Call of Cthulhu by H. P. Lovecraft, written in 1926. Here it is stated that the surviving sailor Gustaf Johansen lived in "an old house at Egeberg" where he died after ramming Cthulhu head on with a fishing vessel.
