= Sæter tram stop =

Tram stop in Oslo, Norway

Sæter
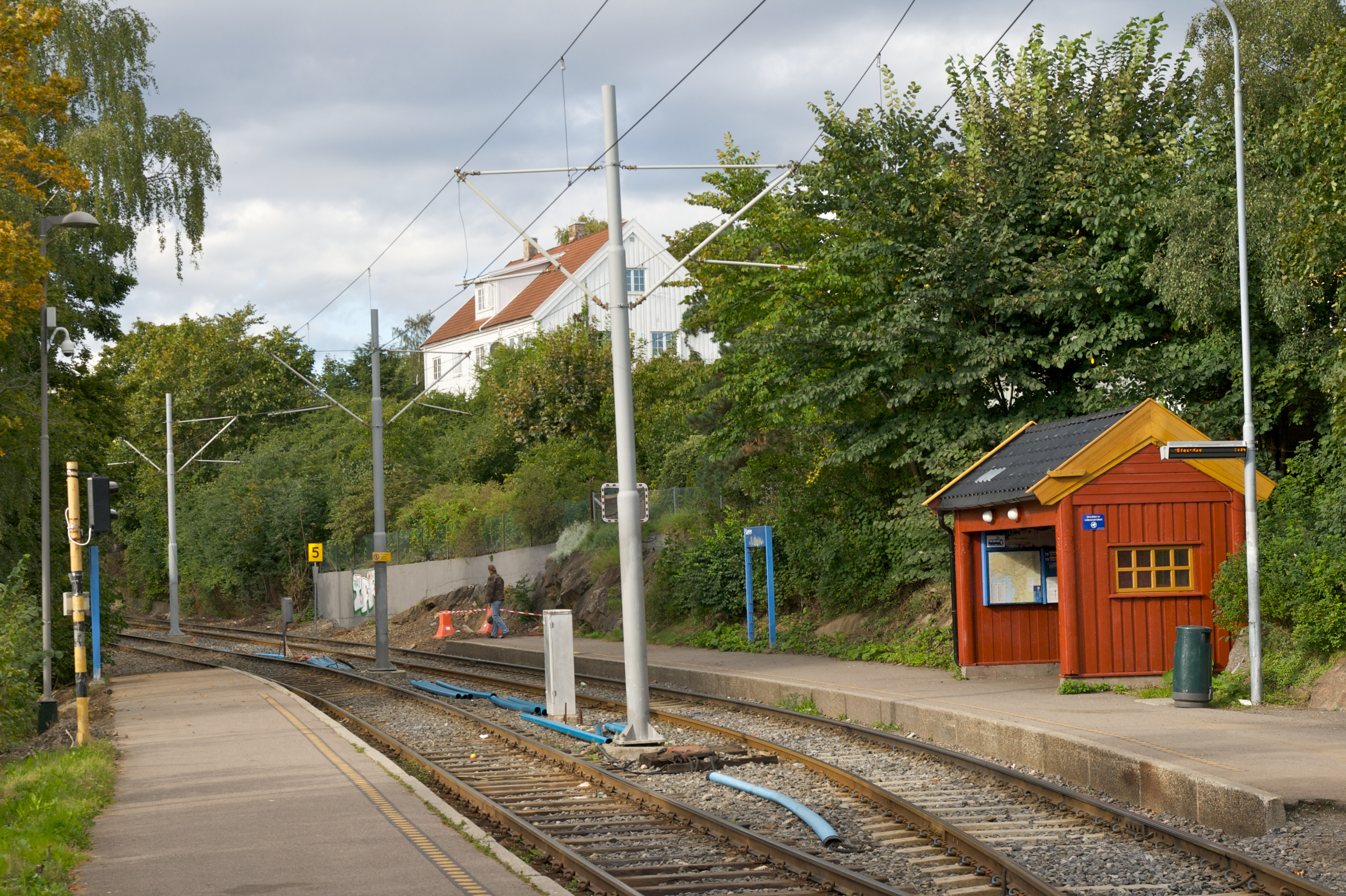

General information
- Location: Nordstrand
- Coordinates: 59.861022°N 10.798702°E
- Line: Ekeberg Line

History
- Opened: 11 June 1917

Services
Preceding station	Trams in Oslo	Following station
Bråten towards Bekkestua	Line 13	Ljabru Terminus
Bråten towards Majorstuen	Line 19	Ljabru Terminus
Location

Sæter is a light rail tram stop on the Oslo Tramway.

Located at Nordstrand, it was the terminus of the Ekeberg Line when it was opened in 1917 by AS Ekebergbanen in cooperation with Kristiania Sporveisselskab. In 1941 the Ekeberg Line was extended to Ljabru, the current terminus. Until 1967, the stretch between Sæter and Ljabru was the only single track rail in Oslo.

Sæter is a key word in John Buchan's novel The Three Hostages.
