= Ljabru tram stop =

Tram stop in Oslo, Norway

Ljabru
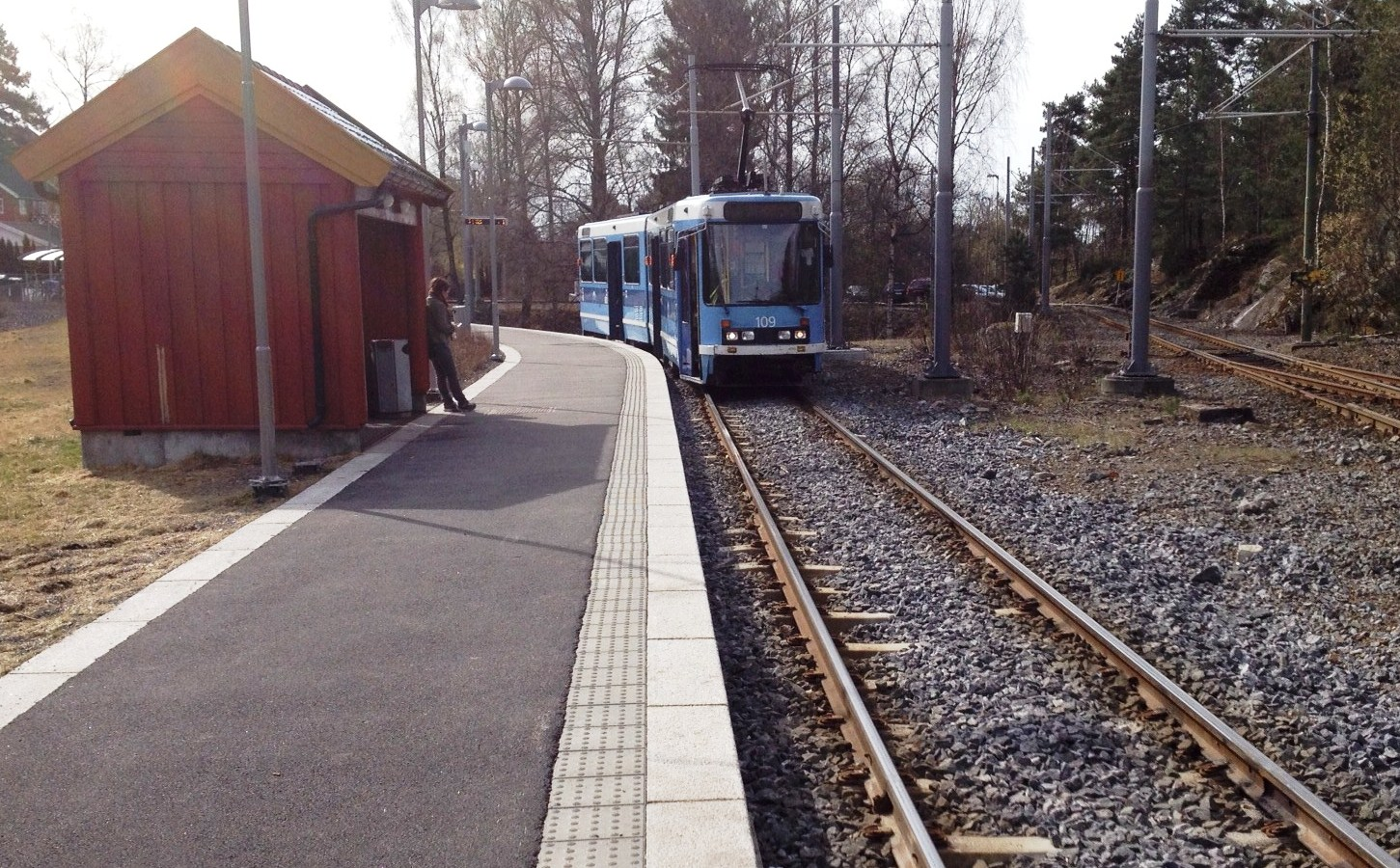

General information
- Location: Ljabru, Nordstrand, Oslo; Norway
- Coordinates: 59.853350°N 10.800890°E
- Elevation: 100.0 metres (328.1 ft)
- Line: Ekeberg Line

History
- Opened: 17 September 1941

Services
| Preceding station | Trams in Oslo | Following station |
|---|---|---|
| Sæter towards Bekkestua | Line 13 | Terminus |
| Sæter towards Majorstuen | Line 19 | Terminus |
Location

Ljabru is a light rail tram stop on the Oslo Tramway. Located at Ljabru in Nordstrand, it is the current terminus of the Ekeberg Line. Ljabru is served by lines 13 and 19.

== History ==
It was opened on 17 September 1941 as an extension of that line from Sæter. Until 1967, the stretch between Sæter and Ljabru was the only single track rail in Oslo. A bridge that is located between Ljabru and Sæter was still single track until it was expanded in 2014. This was the last part of the tramway network to be upgraded to double track.
