= Nordstrand, Norway =

Borough of Oslo, Norway

Bydel Nordstrand
- Borough
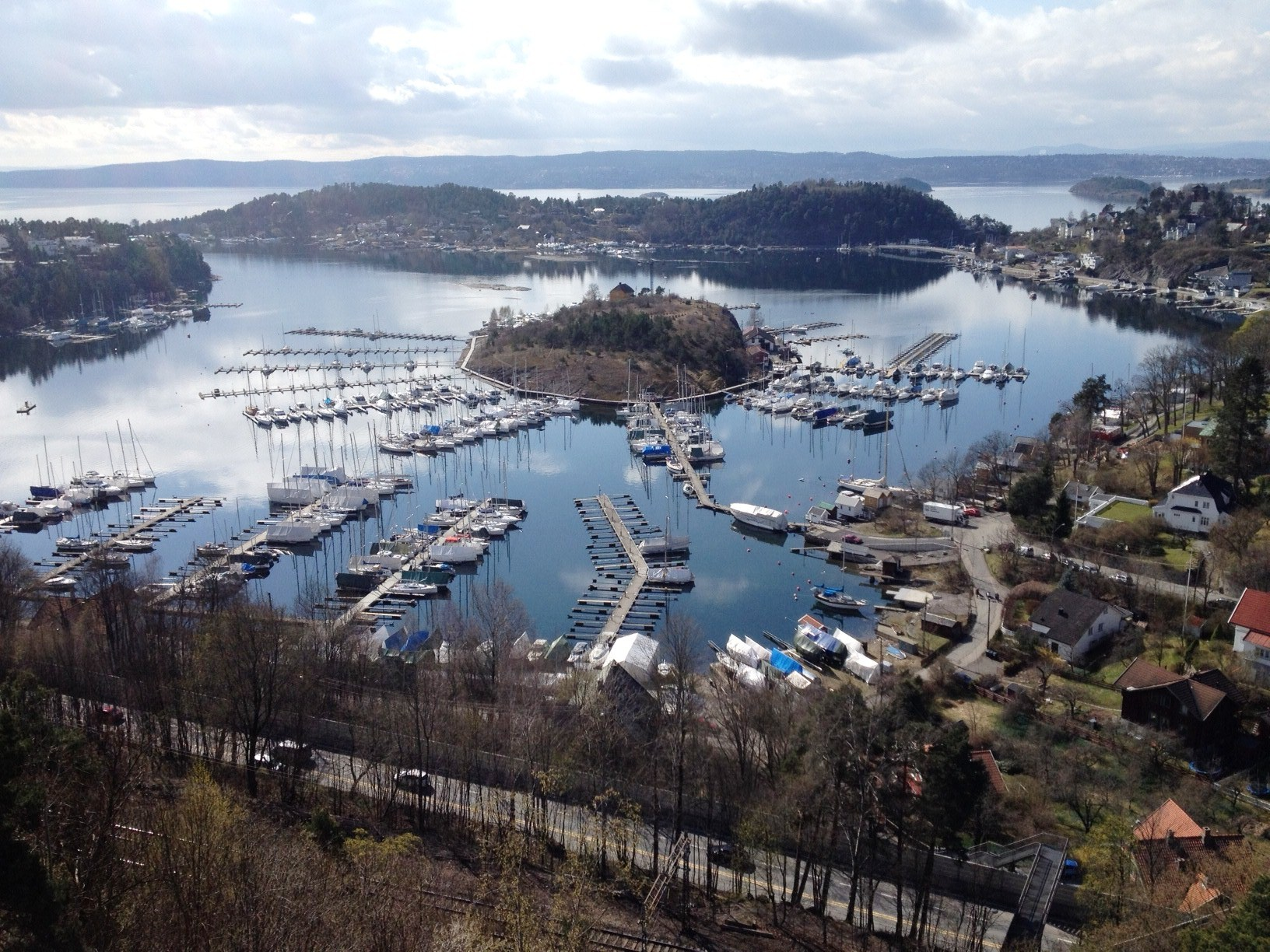

- Coat of arms

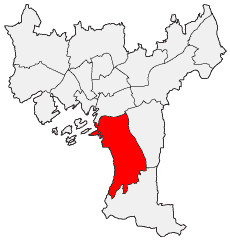
- Coordinates: 59°51′40″N 10°48′01″E
- Country: Norway
- City: Oslo

Area
  - Total: 16.87 km^{2} (6.51 sq mi)

Population (2020)
  - Total: 52,459
  - Density: 3,110/km^{2} (8,100/sq mi)
- Time zone: UTC+1 (CET)
  - Summer (DST): UTC+2 (CEST)
- ISO 3166 code: NO-030114
- Website: bns.oslo.kommune.no

Nordstrand (pronounced [ˈnûːʂʈrɑn]) is a borough of the city of Oslo, Norway. It borders Gamle Oslo in the north, Østensjø in the east and Søndre Nordstrand in the south.

The borough is located in the southern part of the city and with a population of 52,459 people as of 2020. In 2004, Nordstrand was merged with two other boroughs, Lambertseter and Ekeberg-Bekkelaget, to form what is today known simply as Nordstrand. First and second generation immigrants make up 14.6% of the population, which is the lowest percentage in the entire city.

The borough is named after a house named Nordstranden, located at Mosseveien 196.

Nordstrand is one of the wealthiest boroughs in Oslo, and net incomes, real estate prices, and life expectancy are among the city's highest. In demographic statistics Oslo is usually divided into an eastern and a western part. As Nordstrand differs significantly from its bordering boroughs, it is often considered as belonging to the western part even though it is geographically located in the eastern part. Solveien, Nordstrand's most famous road, has been one of Oslo's most expensive addresses since the early 20th century. Nordstrand is also known for its views of the Oslofjord and its long beach.

The borough consists of these neighborhoods of Oslo:

- Nordstrand
- Bekkelaget
- Ekeberg
- Lambertseter
- Ljan

== See also ==
- Nordstrand Vel
