= Carl Nielsen (disambiguation) =

Carl Nielsen (1865–1931) was a Danish composer.

Carl Nielsen may also refer to:

- Carl O. Nielsen (1868–1950), Norwegian businessperson
- Carl Nielsen (rower) (1930–1991), Danish rower
- Carl Nielsen Academy of Music
- Carl Nielsen Edition, the composer's works in a bilingual practical-scientific version on a music philological basis
- Carl Nielsen International Music Competition, a competition for classical musicians held in Odense, Denmark
- Carl Nielsen Museum, a museum dedicated to the life of the composer

== See also ==
- List of compositions by Carl Nielsen
- Carl Nilsson (disambiguation)
