= Gjøa =

First ship to cross the Northwest Passage

Coordinates: 59°54′13.44″N 10°41′56.32″E

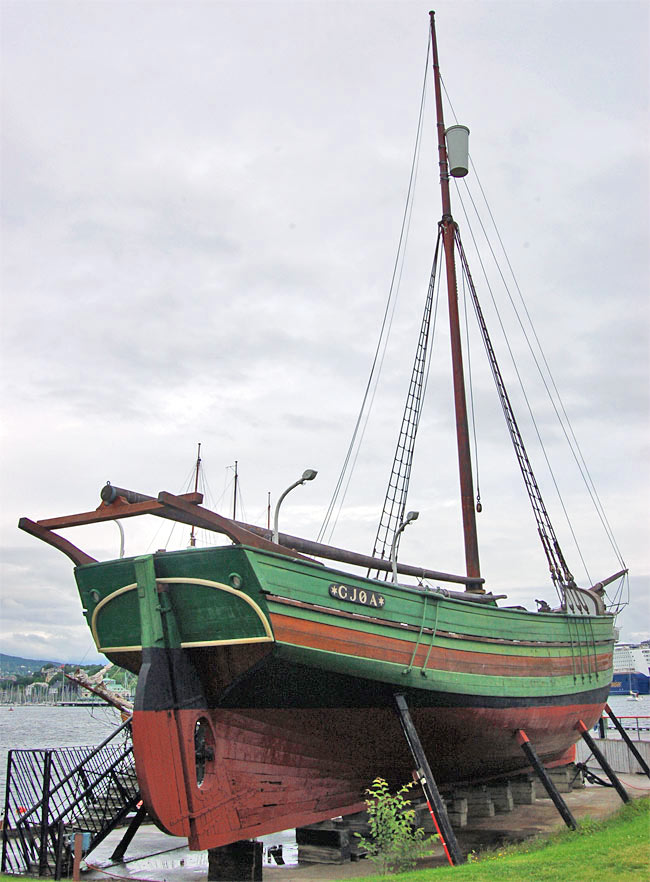
Gjøa at the Norwegian Maritime Museum in Oslo

Gjøa [jøː.ɑ] is a museum ship and was the first vessel to transit the Northwest Passage. With a crew of six, Roald Amundsen traversed the passage in a three-year journey, finishing in 1906.

== History ==
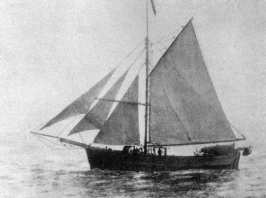
Gjøa, the first ship to sail through the Northwest Passage

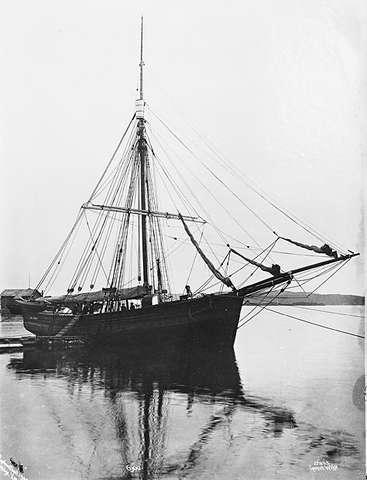
Gjøa in 1903, at the time of the Northwest Passage expedition

=== Construction ===
The 70 by 20 feet (21.3 by 6.1 metres) square-sterned sloop of 47 net register tonnage (4,700 cubic feet [130 cubic metres]) was built by Knut Johannesson Skaale in Rosendal, Norway in 1872, the same year Amundsen was born. She was named Gjøa after her then owner's wife, and for the next 28 years the vessel served as a herring fishing boat.

=== Purchase by Amundsen ===
On March 28, 1901, Amundsen bought her from Asbjørn Sexe of Ullensvang, Norway, for his forthcoming expedition to the Arctic Ocean. Gjøa was much smaller than vessels used by other Arctic expeditions, but Amundsen intended to live off the limited resources of the land and sea through which he was to travel, and reasoned that the land could not sustain a larger crew (this had been a possible cause of the catastrophic failure of Franklin's lost expedition fifty years previously). Her shallow draught would help her traverse the shoals of the Arctic straits. Perhaps most importantly, the ageing ship was all that Amundsen (who was financing his expedition largely by spending his inheritance) could afford.

Amundsen had little experience of Arctic sailing, and so decided to undertake a training expedition before braving the Arctic ice. He engaged Hans Christian Johannsen, her previous owner, and a small crew, and sailed from Tromsø in April 1901. The next five months were spent sealing on the pack ice of the Barents Sea. Following their return to Tromsø in September, Amundsen set about remedying the deficiencies in Gjøa that the trip had exposed. He had a little 13 horsepower (9.7 kilowatts) marine paraffin motor, connected with a winch, for navigation in light winds and to facilitate handlings. Much of the winter was spent upgrading her ice sheathing, as Amundsen knew she would spend several winters iced-in.

=== Journey through the Northwest Passage ===
In the spring of 1902, her refit complete, Amundsen sailed Gjøa to Christiania (now Oslo), the capital of Norway. At this time Norway was still in a union with Sweden, and Amundsen hoped the nationalistic spirit which was sweeping the country would attract sponsors willing to underwrite the expedition's growing costs. After much wrangling, and a donation from the Swedish King, Oscar II, he succeeded. By the time Amundsen returned, Norway had gained its independence, and he and his crew were among the new country's first national heroes.

Amundsen served as the expedition leader and Gjøa's master. His crew were Godfred Hansen, a Danish naval lieutenant and Gjøa's first officer; Helmer Hanssen, second officer, an experienced ice pilot who later accompanied Amundsen on subsequent expeditions; Anton Lund, an experienced sealing captain; Peder Ristvedt, chief engineer; Gustav Juel Wiik, second engineer, a gunner in the Royal Norwegian Navy; and Adolf Henrik Lindstrøm, cook.

Gjøa left the Oslofjord on June 16, 1903, and made for the Labrador Sea west of Greenland. From there she crossed Baffin Bay and navigated the narrow, icy straits of the Arctic Archipelago. By late September Gjøa was west of the Boothia Peninsula and began to encounter worsening weather and sea ice. Amundsen put her into a natural harbour on the south shore of King William Island; by October 3 she was iced in.

There she remained for nearly two years, with her crew undertaking sledge journeys to make measurements to determine the location of the north magnetic pole and learning from the local Inuit. The harbour, known as Uqsuqtuuq ("much fat") in Inuktitut, has become the only settlement on the island – Gjoa Haven, Nunavut, which now has a population of over a thousand people (1,349 at the 2021 census).

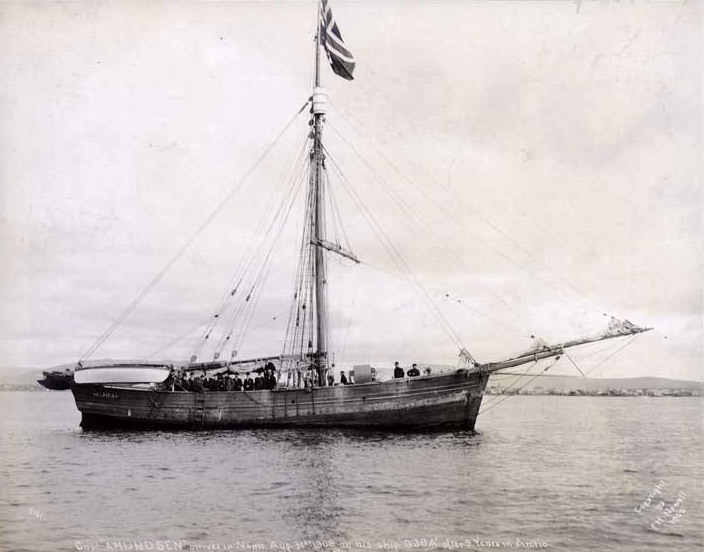
Gjøa arrives in Nome, Alaska in August 1906

Gjøa left Gjoa Haven on August 13, 1905, and motored through the treacherous straits south of Victoria Island, and from there west into the Beaufort Sea. By October Gjøa was again iced-in, this time near Herschel Island in the Yukon. Amundsen left his men on board and spent much of the winter skiing 500 miles (800 kilometres) south to Eagle, Alaska to telegraph news of the expedition's success. He returned in March, but Gjøa remained icebound until July 11. Gjøa reached Nome in Alaska on August 31, 1906. She sailed on to San Francisco, California, where the expedition was met with a hero's welcome on October 19.

=== San Francisco ===
Rather than sail her round Cape Horn and back to Norway, the Norwegian American community in San Francisco prevailed on Amundsen to sell Gjøa to them.

After being anchored at Mare Island for three years, the Gjøa was given to San Francisco in 1909

The ship was donated to the city of San Francisco, and the ship was dragged up the beach to the northwest corner of Golden Gate Park, surrounded by a low fence and put on display. Amundsen knew that because of the fame that his exploits aboard Gjøa had earned, he would be able to gain access to Nansen's ship Fram which had been custom-built for ice work and was owned by the Norwegian state. Therefore, Amundsen left Gjøa in San Francisco. He and his crew traveled back to Norway by commercial ship. Of the original expedition members, only Wiik failed to return to Norway, because he had died of illness during the third Arctic winter.

Souvenir hunters and vandals necessitated a fence be erected and a caretaker hired — the gentleman lived in the ship and was enumerated there during the 1910 United States Census...The city installed a seal tank behind the stern of the ship and, according to the Call, the Alaskan fur seal that occupied it acted as an additional nighttime guardian of the boat...Occasionally, the city would be spurred to make repairs and give the Gjøa a paint job (a 1968 visit to the city by Norway’s King Olav provided motivation for one such spruce-up), but generally the vessel that survived the crushing ice of the Arctic seas was a helpless victim to neglect and vandalism.

== Preservation ==
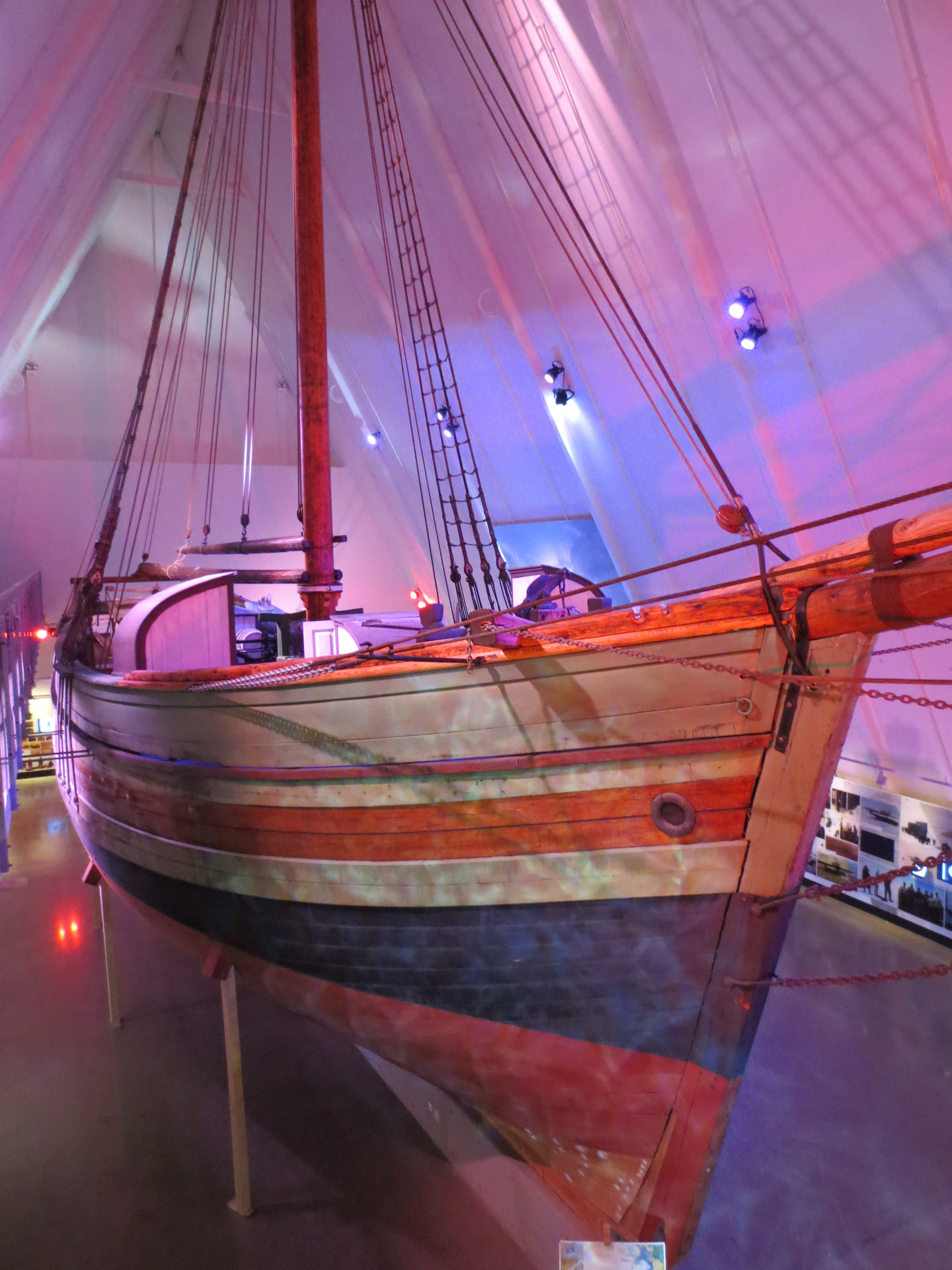
Gjøa in the Fram Museum in Oslo

Over the following decades Gjøa slowly deteriorated, and by 1939 she was in poor condition.

In 1939, Erik Krag founded the Gjoa Foundation and undertook a complete refurbishment that was completed in 1949.

Refurbishment was delayed by World War II, and repairs were not completed until 1949. Being displayed outdoors and having faced 66 years of high winds, ocean salt and sand, the boat once again suffered deterioration, and evidence of campfires, until in 1972, with the help of Erik Krag, a Danish American shipping company owner (Inter-Ocean Steamship Corporation) of San Francisco, Gjøa was returned to Norway. Krag was knighted by the king of Norway for his efforts in shipping home Gjøa.

Gjøa was displayed in the Norwegian Maritime Museum (Norwegian: Norsk Maritimt Museum) in Bygdøy, Oslo. In May 2009 the Norwegian Maritime Museum and the Fram Museum (Norwegian: Frammuseet) signed an agreement for the Fram Museum of Bygdøy to take over the exhibition of Gjøa. It has been displayed in a separate building at Fram Museum.

A bauta (memorial pillar or standing stone) now stands near Gjøa's former home in San Francisco. Gjøa was also featured as a filming location in the 2005 documentary, The Search for the Northwest Passage, in which Kåre Conradi played Amundsen.

== See also ==
- Arctic exploration
- Hendrick van der Heul

== Sources ==
- Roald Amundsen told the story of the exploration of the Norwest Passage in Nordvestpassagen : Beretning om Gjøa-ekspedisjonen 1903-1907 . The material was translated into English as The North-West Passage: Being the Record of a Voyage of Exploration of the ship "Gjøa" 1903–1907 (Ams Press Inc; 1908, ISBN 978-0-404-11625-5 and reprinted Kessinger Pub Co; 2007, ISBN 978-0-548-77250-8).
  - The North-West Passage; Being the Record of a Voyage of Exploration of the Ship "Gjöa". Vol. 1. New York: E.P. Dutton and Co. 1908. OCLC 971379351.
  - The North-West Passage; Being the Record of a Voyage of Exploration of the Ship "Gjöa". Vol. 2. New York: E.P. Dutton and Co.
- Huntford, Roland (1999) The Last Place on Earth (Modern Library) ISBN 0-349-11395-5
- Oterhals, Leo (2006) Havdrønn : om berømte båter og stolte båteiere (AS Lagunen) ISBN 82-90757-23-9
