= Carl Nilsson =

Carl Nilsson may refer to:

- Carl Nilsson (runner)
- Carl Nilsson (wrestler)

== See also ==
- Carl Nielsen (disambiguation)
