= Fram Islands =

Island group in Adélie Land, Antarctica

- Location within Antarctica

Geography
- Location: Antarctica
- Coordinates: 66°38′S 139°50′E

Administration
- Administered under the Antarctic Treaty System

Demographics
- Population: Uninhabited

The Fram Islands are a small group of rocky islands and rocks in the western portion of the Géologie Archipelago, 4 kilometres (2 nmi) north-northwest of Cape Géodésie. They were photographed from the air by U.S. Navy Operation Highjump, 1946–47, charted by the French Antarctic Expedition, 1949–51, and named by them for the Norwegian polar ship Fram, used by Fridtjof Nansen in the Arctic and Roald Amundsen in the Antarctic.

== See also ==
- List of Antarctic and subantarctic islands
