= Carl O. Nielsen =

Norwegian businessman

Carl O. Nielsen (16 September 1868 – 1950) was a Norwegian businessperson.

He was born in Christiania. He founded several companies, including Nielsen & Danielsen in 1897, and Norsk Gjærde & Metaldukfabrik, Scandinavia's first fence manufacturer, in 1902. He had his own car dealer company C. O. Nielsens Automobilforretning, which was later transformed into A/S Auto. Nielsen was the first general manager in A/S Auto, but later backed out. He also co-founded the Royal Norwegian Automobile Club. In 1916 he co-founded the company Neilson & Kittle Canning (also given as "Nielsen and Kittle") in San Pedro, California, a large sardine factory. He later returned to Norway to run an eponymous company.

He was an honorary member of the Norwegian Museum of Cultural History. He was buried at Vestre gravlund in June 1950.
