= Auto (company) =

Car dealer in Oslo, Norway

Logo.

Aktieselskabet (A/S) Auto, (known as Kristiania until 1924) was a car dealer in Oslo, Norway. Founded in 1908 with Carl O. Nielsen as the first general manager, it had roots in his former company, C. O. Nielsens Automobilforretning. The company had a sales office in Kvadraturen (Tollbodgaten 20) and a workshop in Frogner (Lindemanns gate 9). It later expanded to incorporate other addresses in Lindemanns gate.

The company imported and sold Lorraine-Dietrich and Cottereau from the start, then also Isotta Fraschini, Minerva and Thornycroft. During the First World War Dodge Brothers and Federal were added, during the interwar period Renault and De Dion-Bouton.

The company went defunct in 1930, amid the economic depression. The last manager was Carl Simonsen. Many of the car brands have also been discontinued.
