= Fram Museum =

Norwegian ship museum in Oslo

Coordinates: 59°54′12″N 10°41′58″E

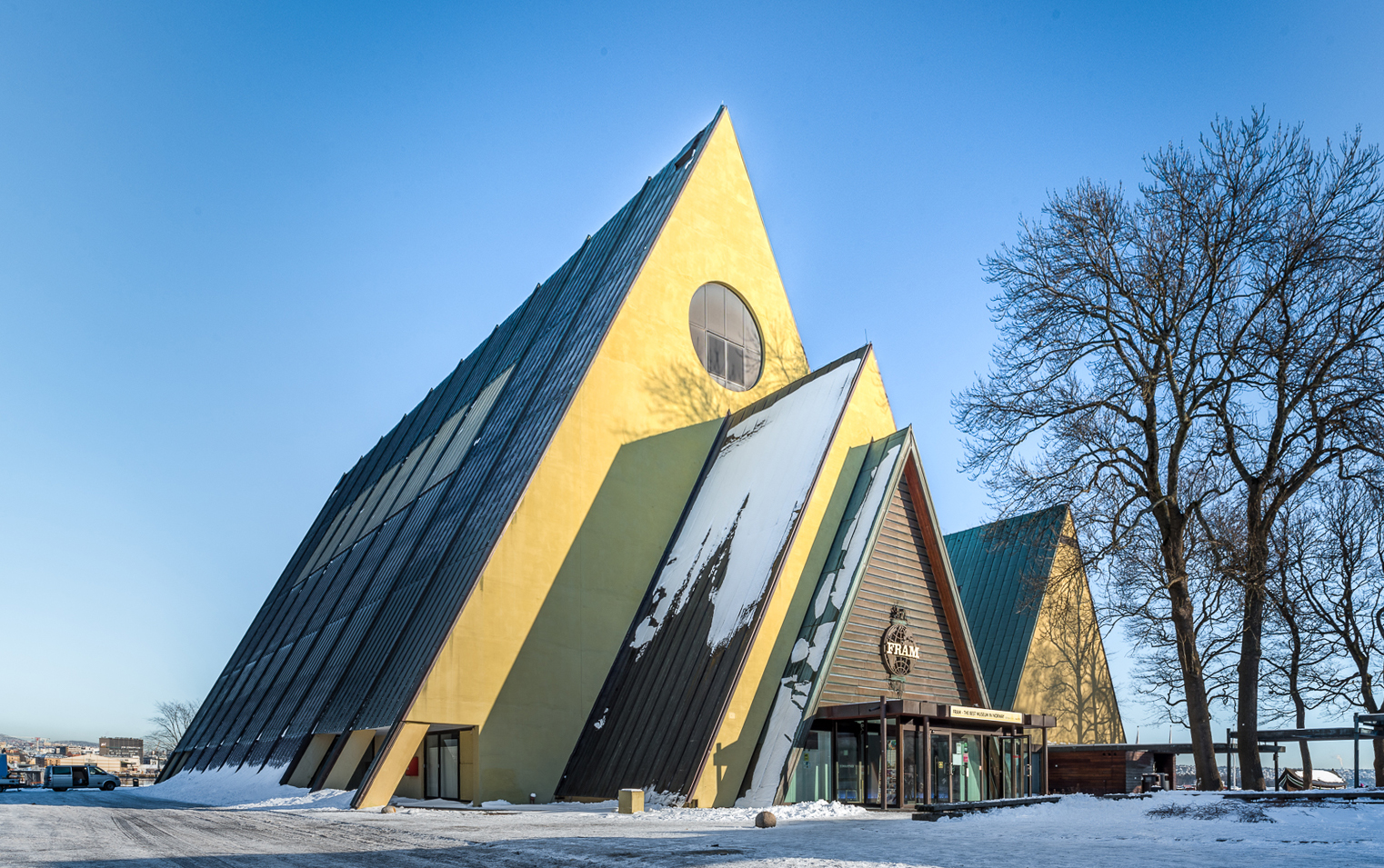
The Fram Museum

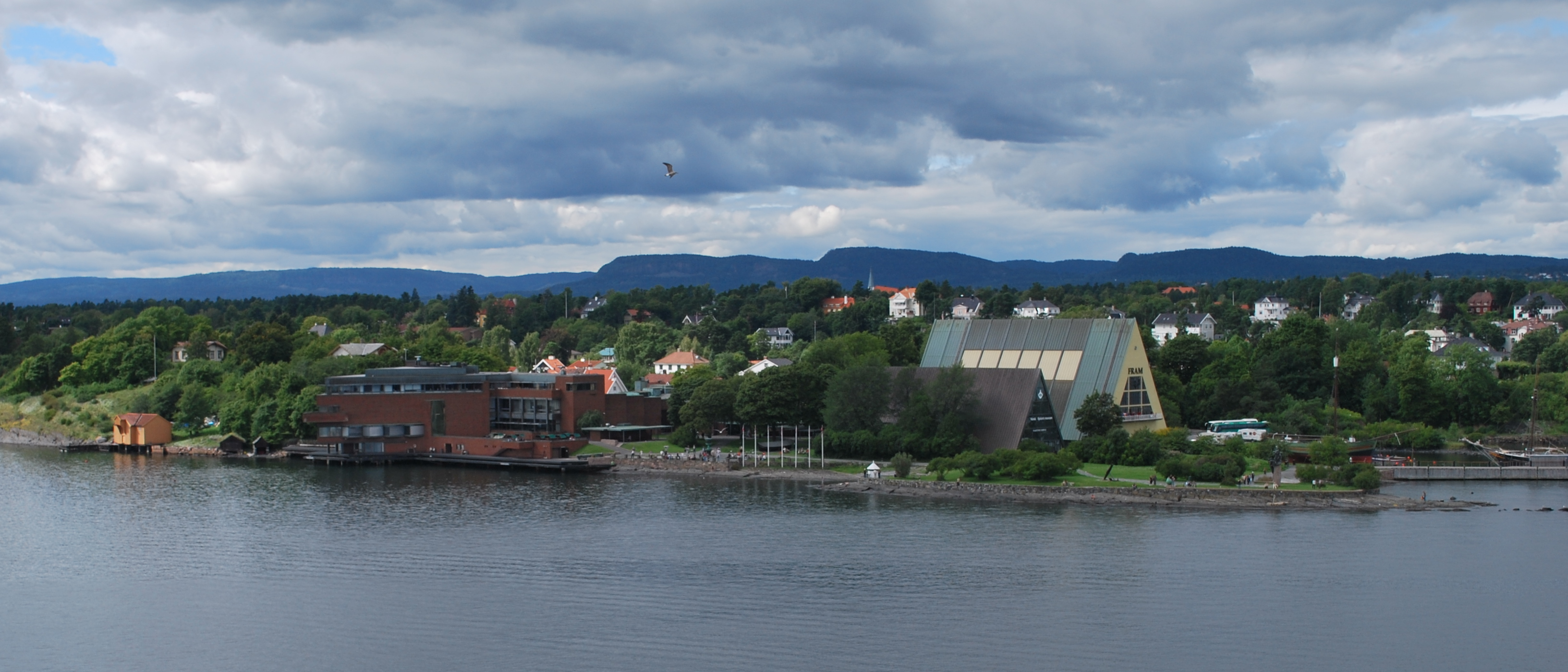
Fram Museum (right) Norwegian Maritime Museum (left)

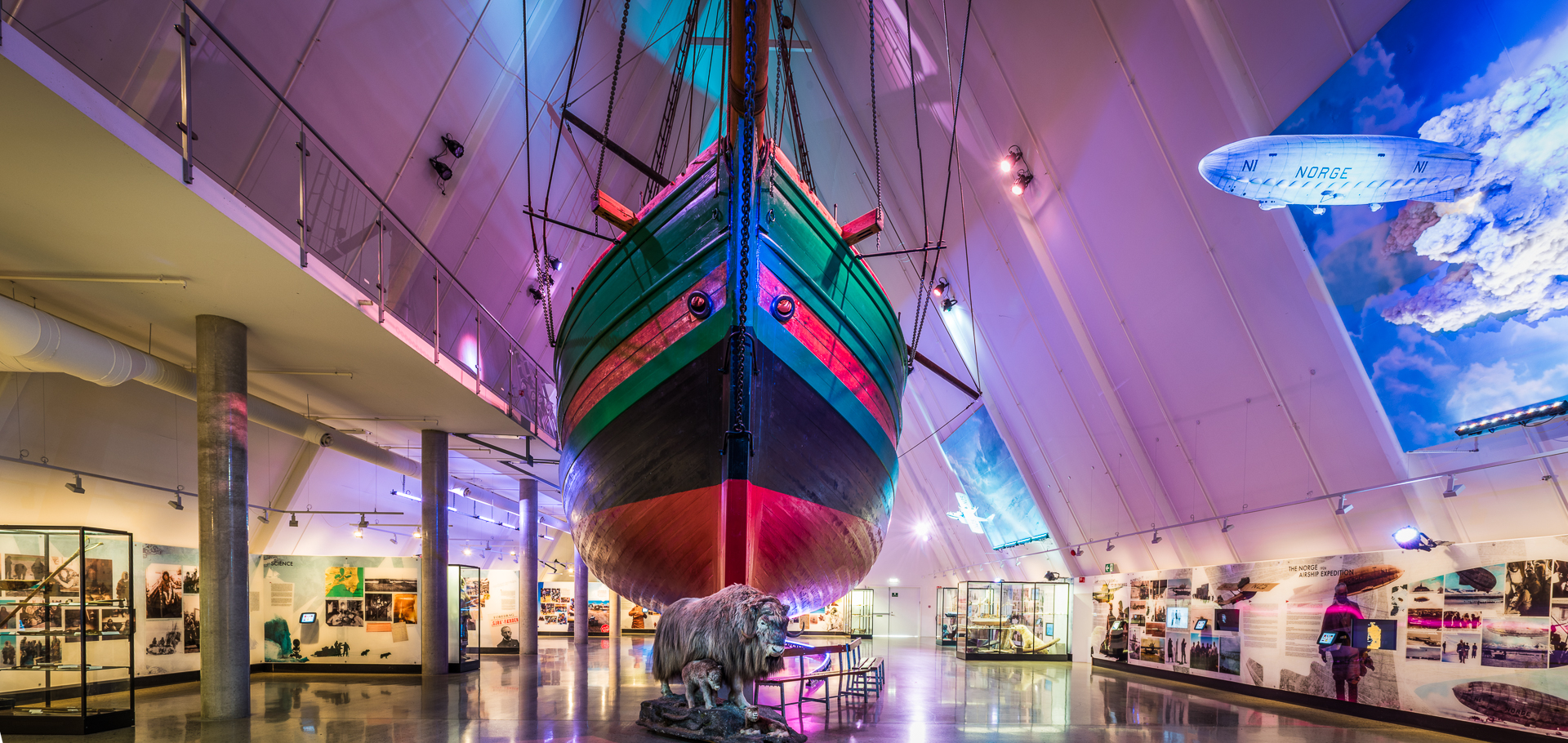
Gjøa, the first ship to sail through the Northwest Passage

The Fram Museum (Norwegian: Frammuseet) is a museum telling the story of Norwegian polar exploration. It is located on the peninsula of Bygdøy in Oslo, Norway.

Fram Museum is in an area with several other museums including the Kon-Tiki Museum, the Norwegian Museum of Cultural History, the Viking Ship Museum and the Norwegian Maritime Museum. Bygdøy Royal Estate, the official summer residence of the King of Norway, and historic Oscarshall are also located nearby.

The Fram Museum was inaugurated on 20 May 1936. It honours Norwegian polar exploration in general and three great Norwegian polar explorers in particular – Fridtjof Nansen, Otto Sverdrup and Roald Amundsen. The museum also exhibits images of the fauna of the polar regions, such as polar bears and penguins.

The Fram Museum is centred principally on the original exploration vessel Fram. The original interior of Fram is intact and visitors can go inside the ship to view it. Fram was commissioned, designed, and built by Scots-Norwegian shipbuilder Colin Archer to specifications provided by Norwegian Arctic explorer Fridtjof Nansen, who financed the building of the ship with a combination of grant monies provided by the Norwegian government and private funding in 1891.

In May 2009 the Norwegian Maritime Museum and the Fram Museum signed an agreement for the Fram Museum to take over the exhibition of the Gjøa, the first vessel to transit the Northwest Passage. Roald Amundsen and a crew of six accomplished that feat in a three-year journey which was finished in 1906. Gjøa is situated inside her own dedicated building at the museum. In 2017 the ship was made fully accessible to visitors.

== Gallery ==
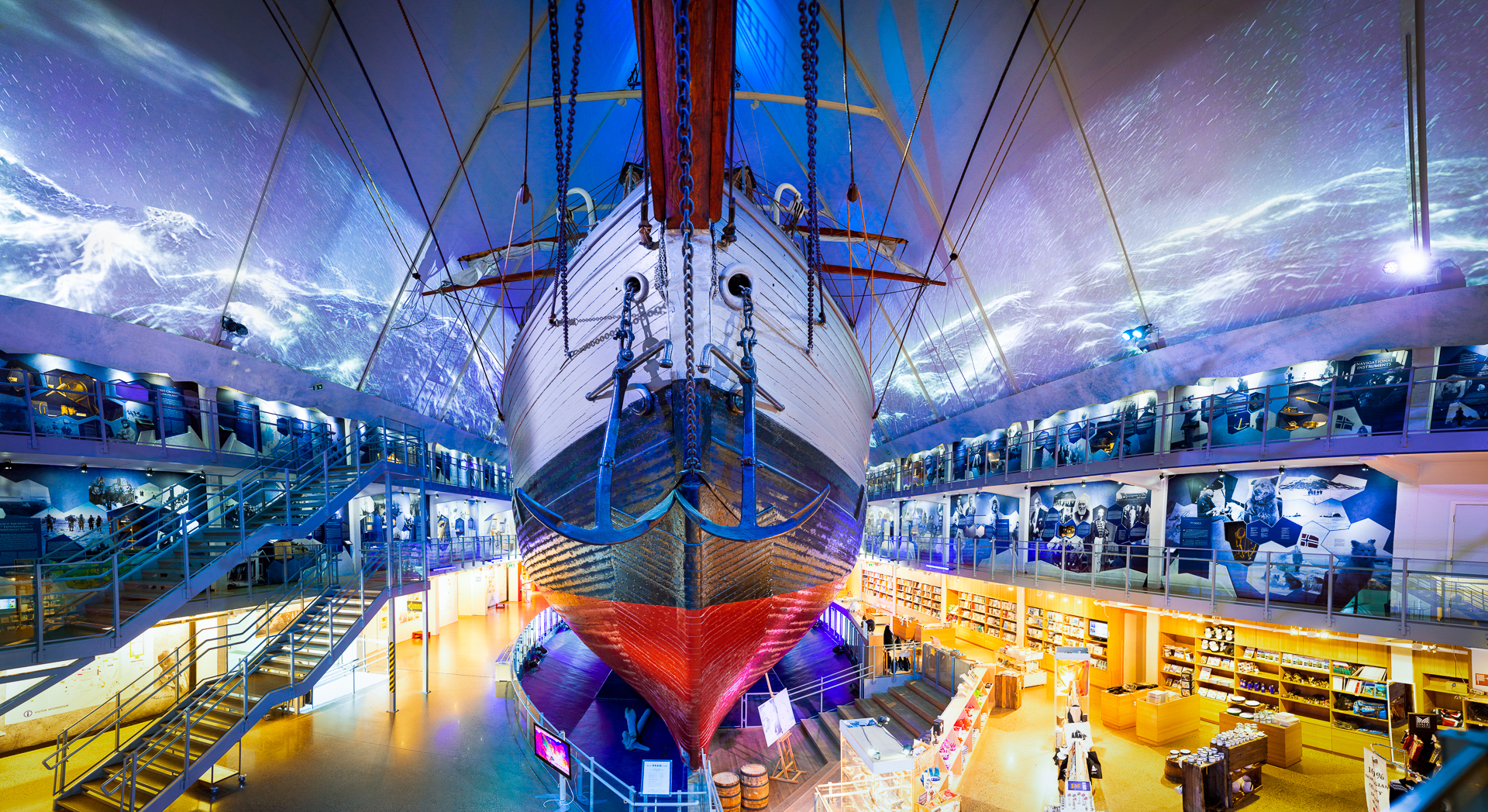
Fram Museum interior after the 2018 modernization

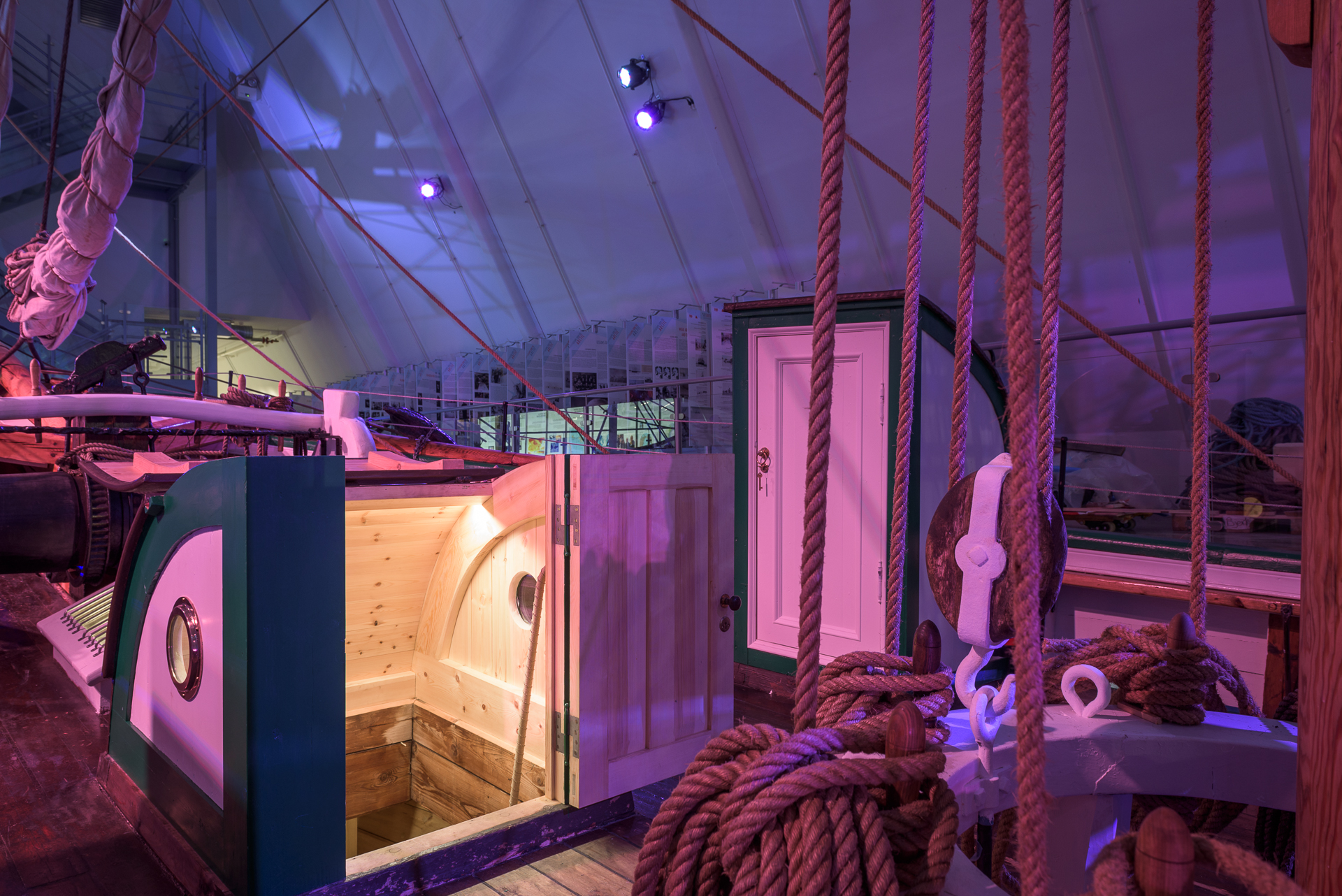
From the deck of polar ship Gjøa

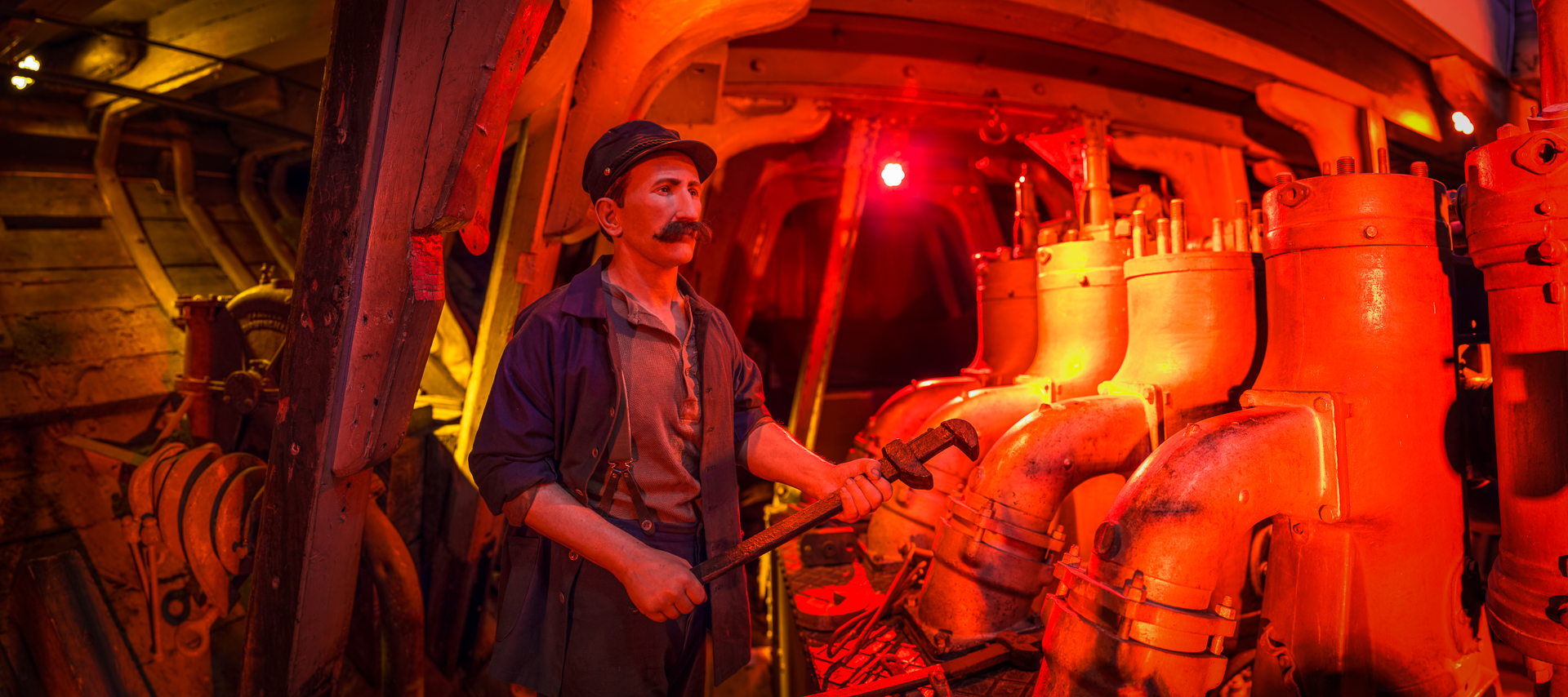
Engine room of the polar ship Fram

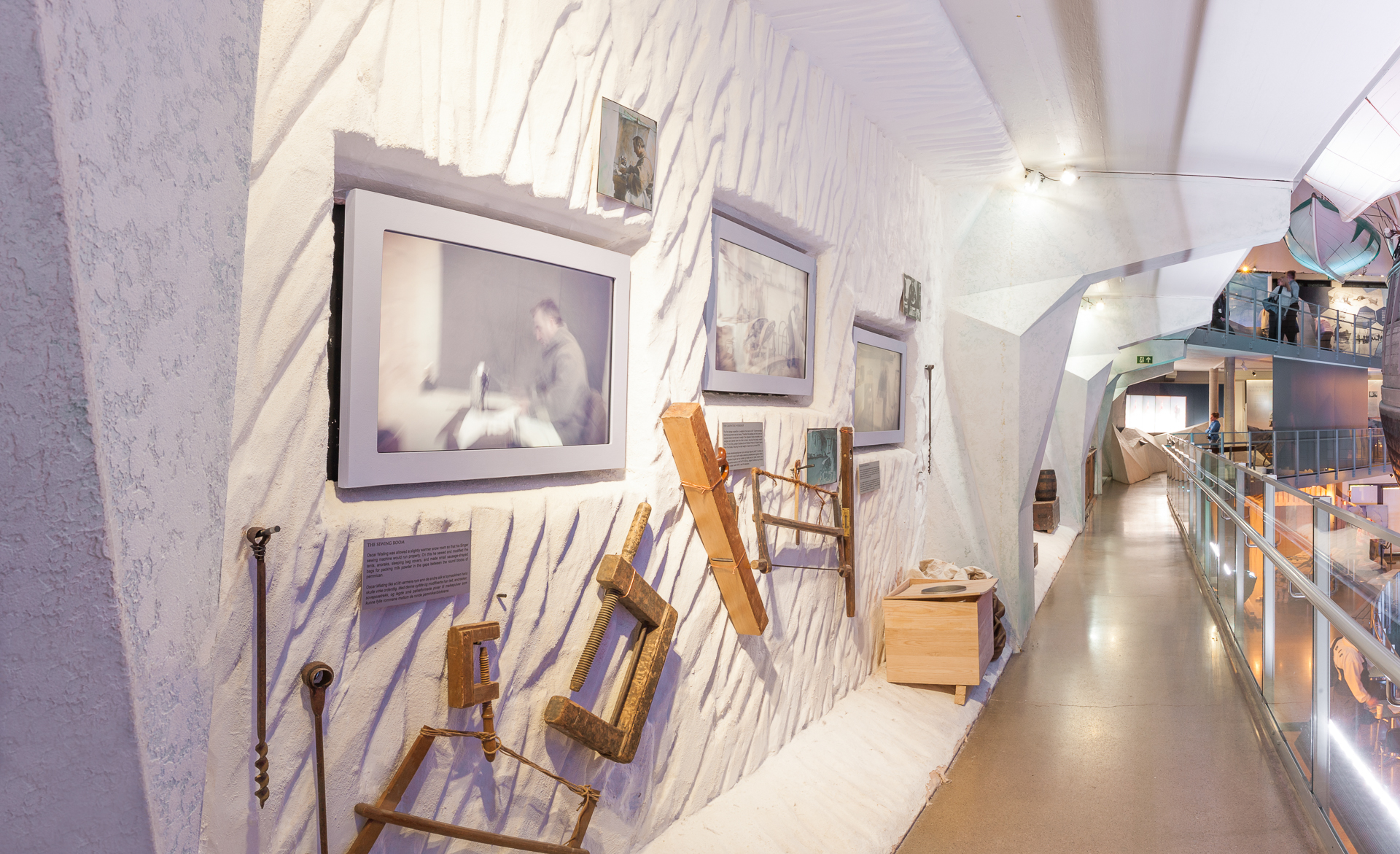
Inside the Fram Museum

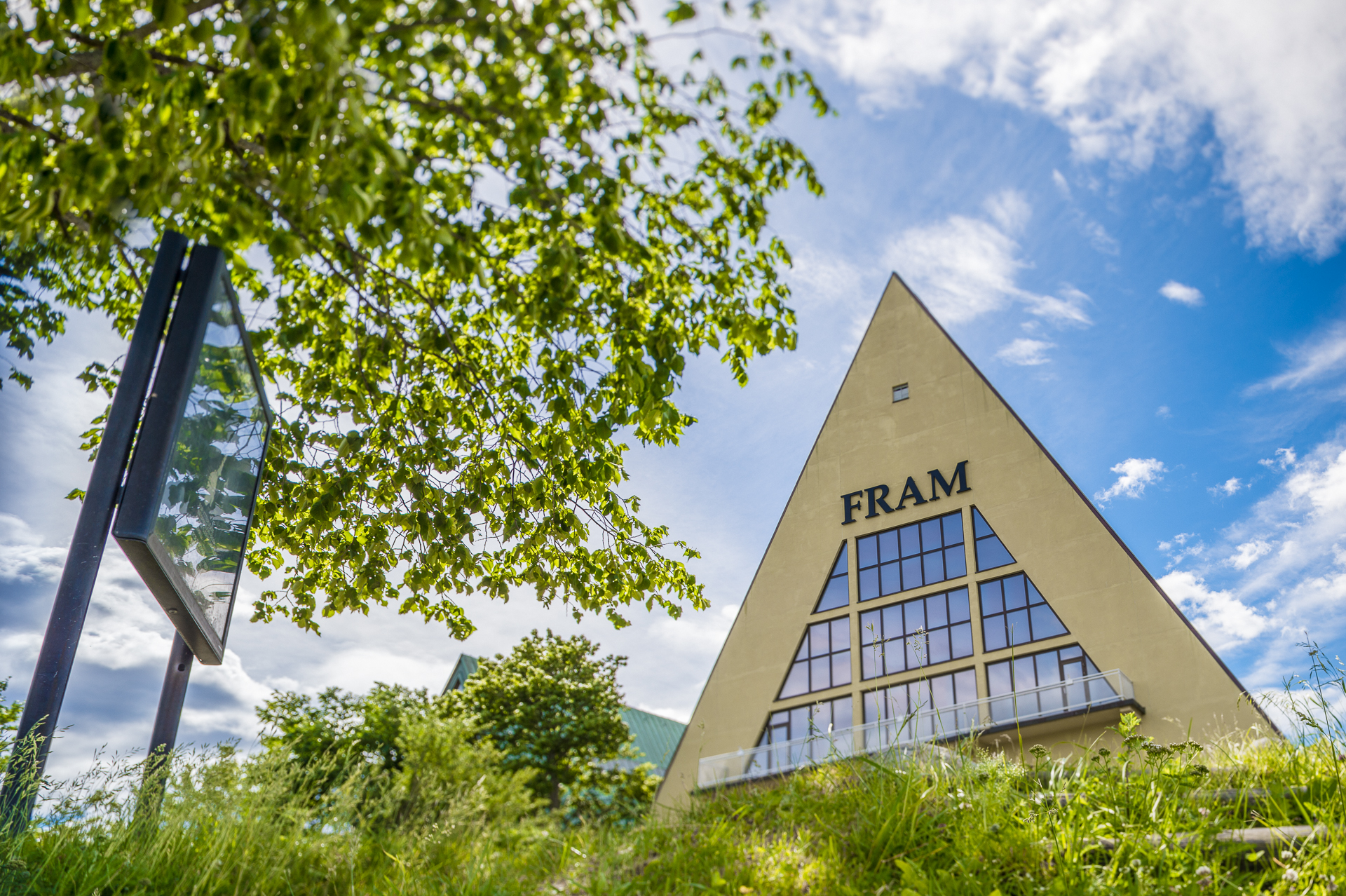
Fram Museum in the summer
