= Norwegian Maritime Museum =

Museum in Oslo

Coordinates: 59.9025°N 10.6985°E

Norwegian Maritime Museum (Norsk Maritimt Museum)
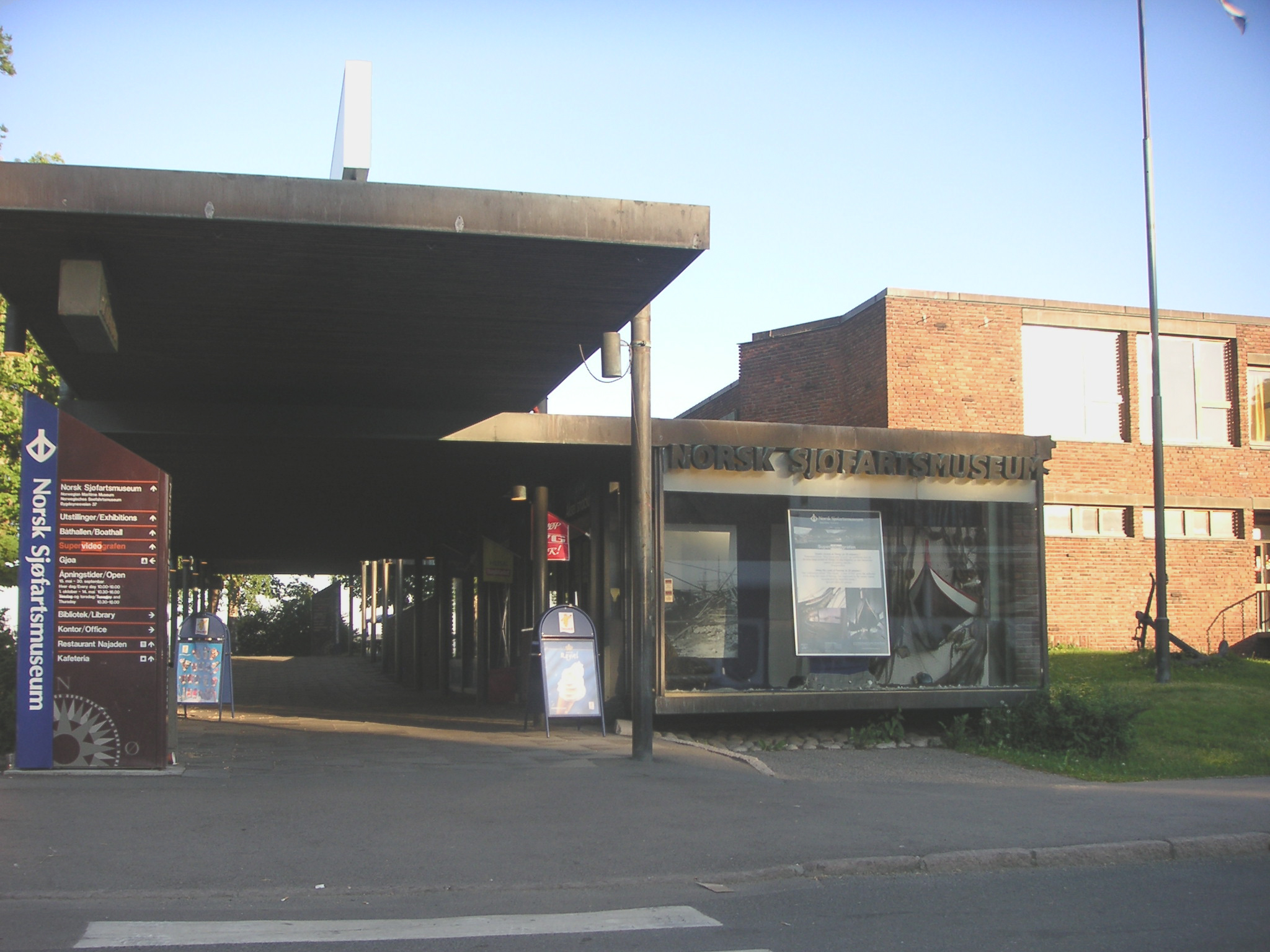
- Established: 1914
- Location: Bygdøynesveien, Bygdøy peninsula, Norway

The Norwegian Maritime Museum (Norwegian: Norsk Maritimt Museum) is located at Bygdøynesveien on the Bygdøy peninsula, on the western side of Oslo, Norway. The Norwegian Maritime Museum is situated near several other museums, including the Fram Museum; the Kon-Tiki Museum; the Norwegian Museum of Cultural History; and the Viking Ship Museum. The Norwegian Maritime Museum is operated in conjunction with Norwegian Folk Museum.

== Overview ==
The museum was founded in 1914 and previously known as the Norsk Sjøfartsmuseum. The exhibits on coast culture and maritime history cover a number of subjects including ship building, boat models, fishing, marine archeology, and shipping. The video "Maritime Norway" by Ivo Caprino and a library are also a part of the museum experience. Additionally the museum has a marine archaeological department. The museum also displays a collection of more than 40 maritime paintings by notable artists.

== Ships ==
The Stavanger and the Svanen are on display. The Stavanger was designed by Colin Archer for the Norwegian Society for Sea Rescue. The three-masted schooner Svanen was built during the winter of 1915–1916 and saw service with the Norwegian merchant fleet.

From 1972, the Gjøa was displayed in the Norwegian Maritime Museum. The ship was the first vessel to transit the Northwest Passage in the 1903–06 Arctic expedition of Roald Amundsen. In 2009, the Norwegian Maritime Museum and the Fram Museum signed an agreement for the Fram Museum to take over the exhibition of the Gjøa. It is currently displayed in a separate building at Fram Museum.

== Notable past directors ==
- Gunnar Isachsen
- Per G. Norseng

== Gallery ==
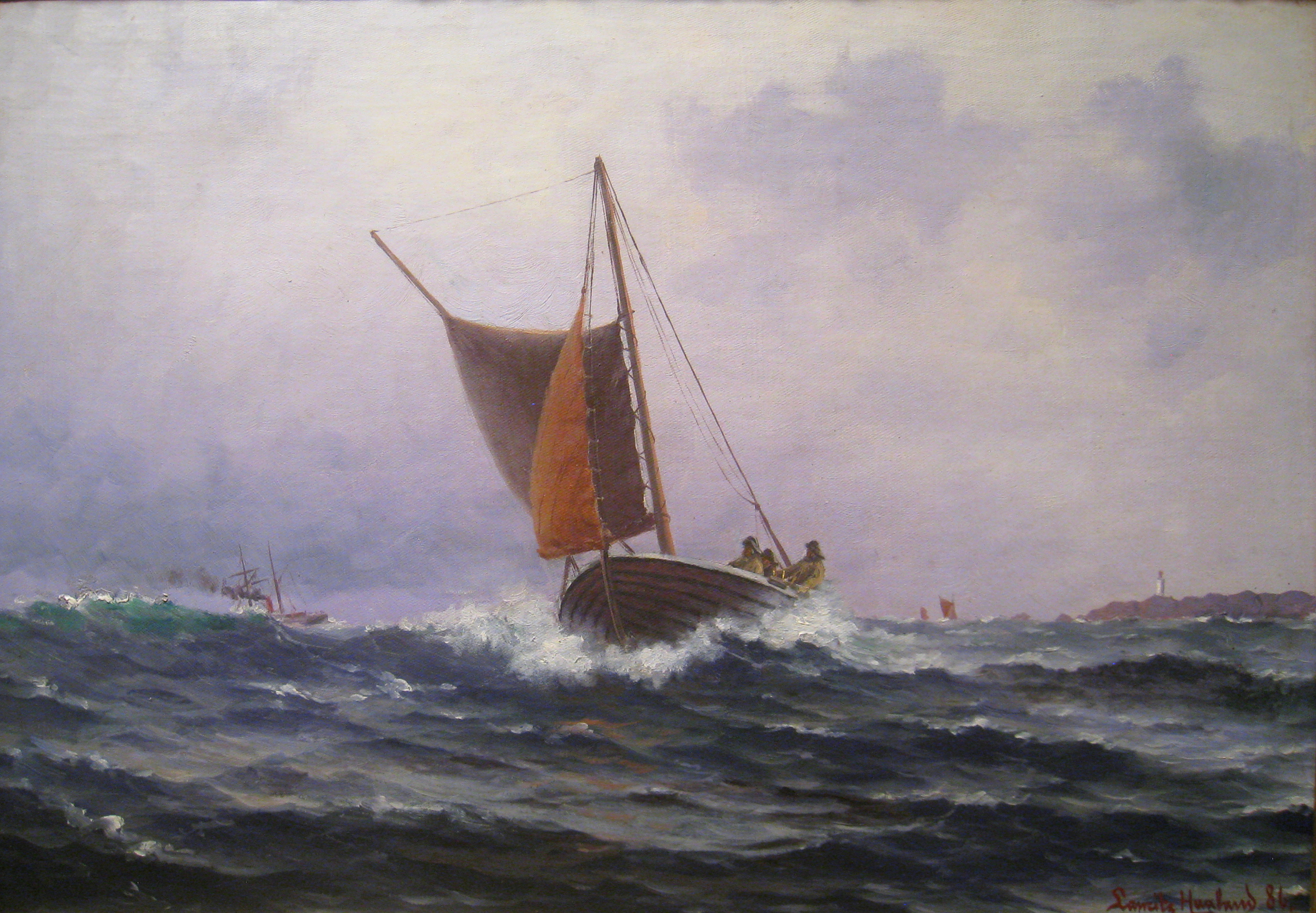
Fiskere Ved Kvitsøy
Lars Lauritz Larsen Haaland

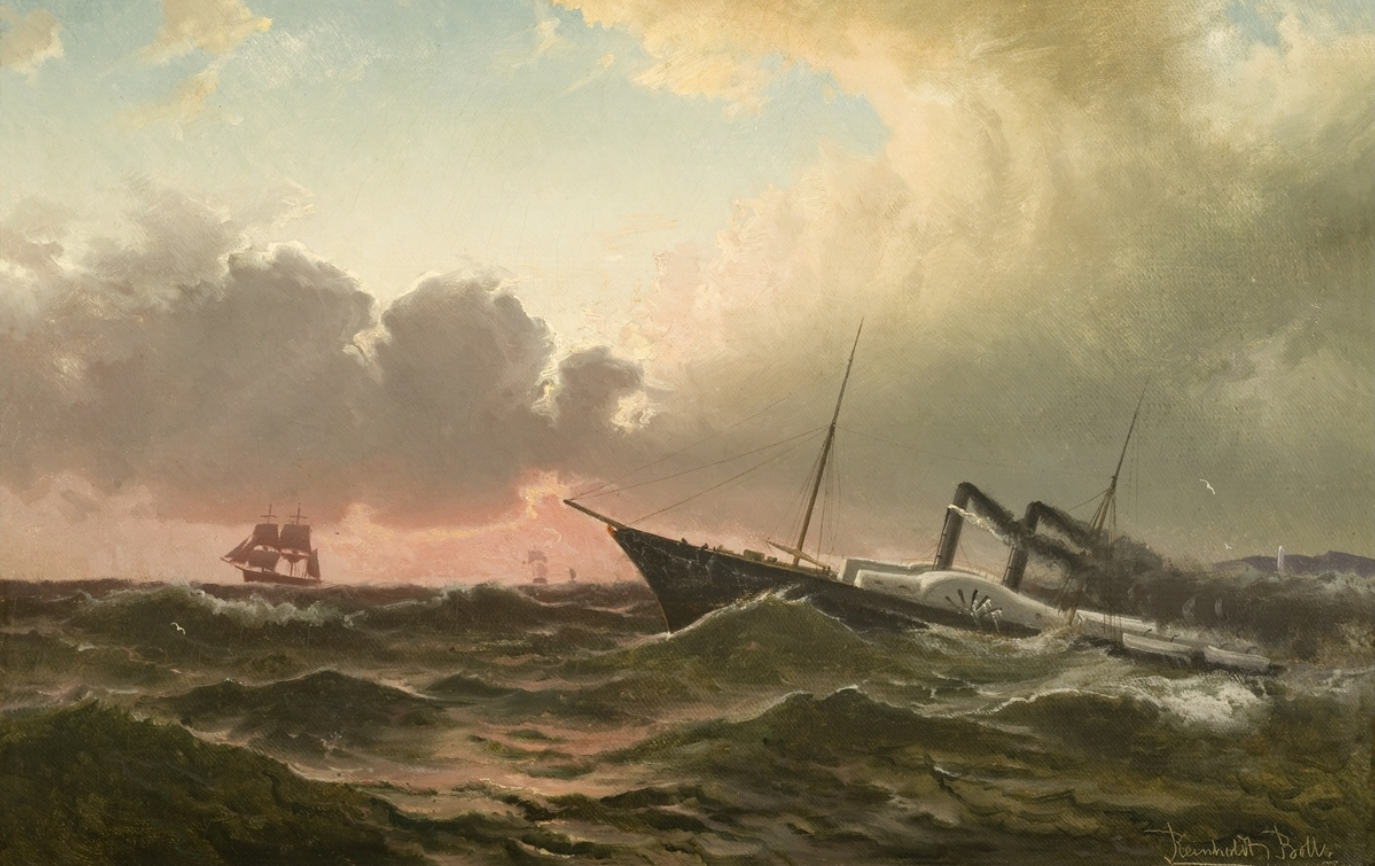
Kronprindsesse Louise
Reinholdt Boll

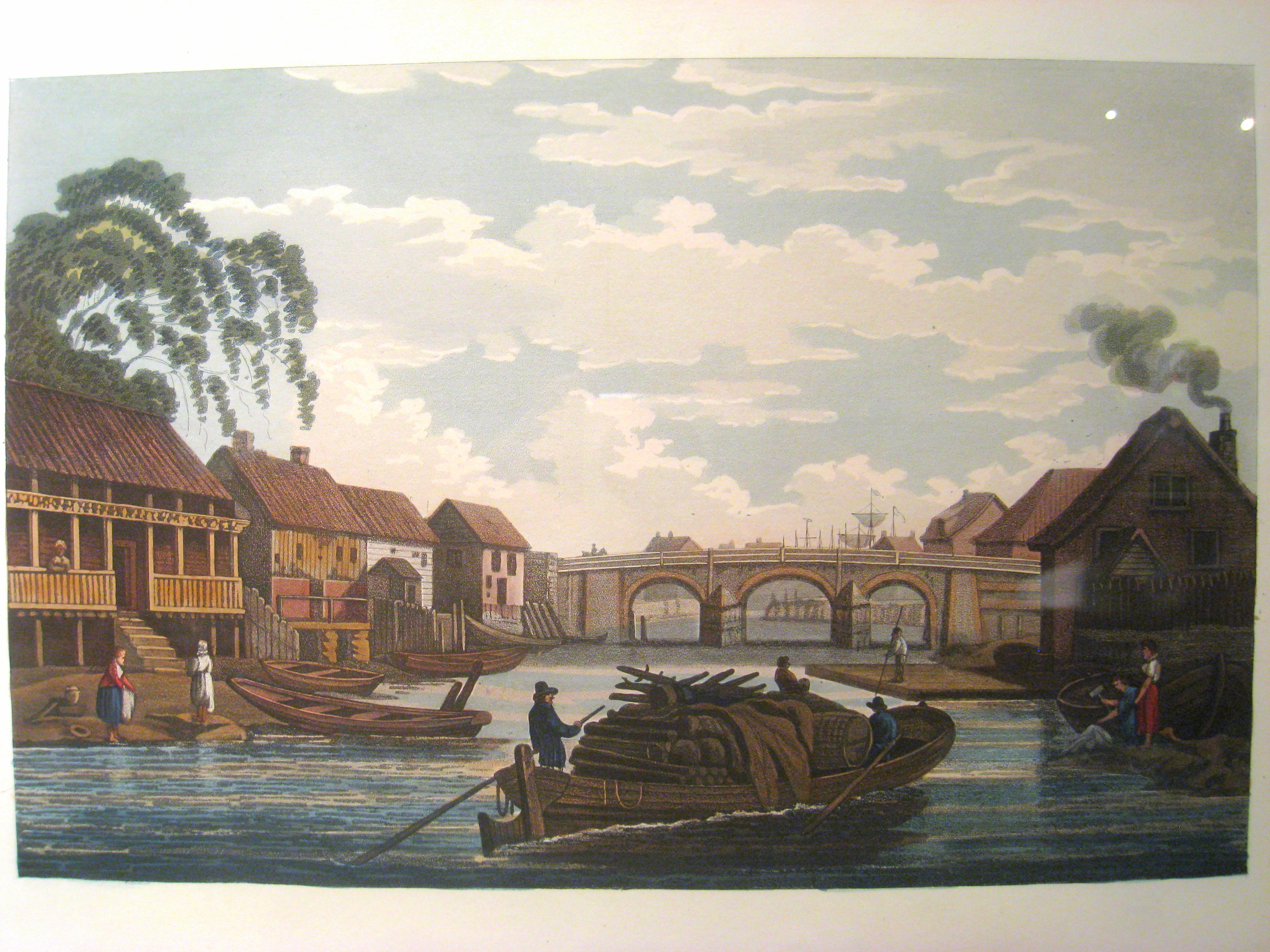
Christiana
John William Edy

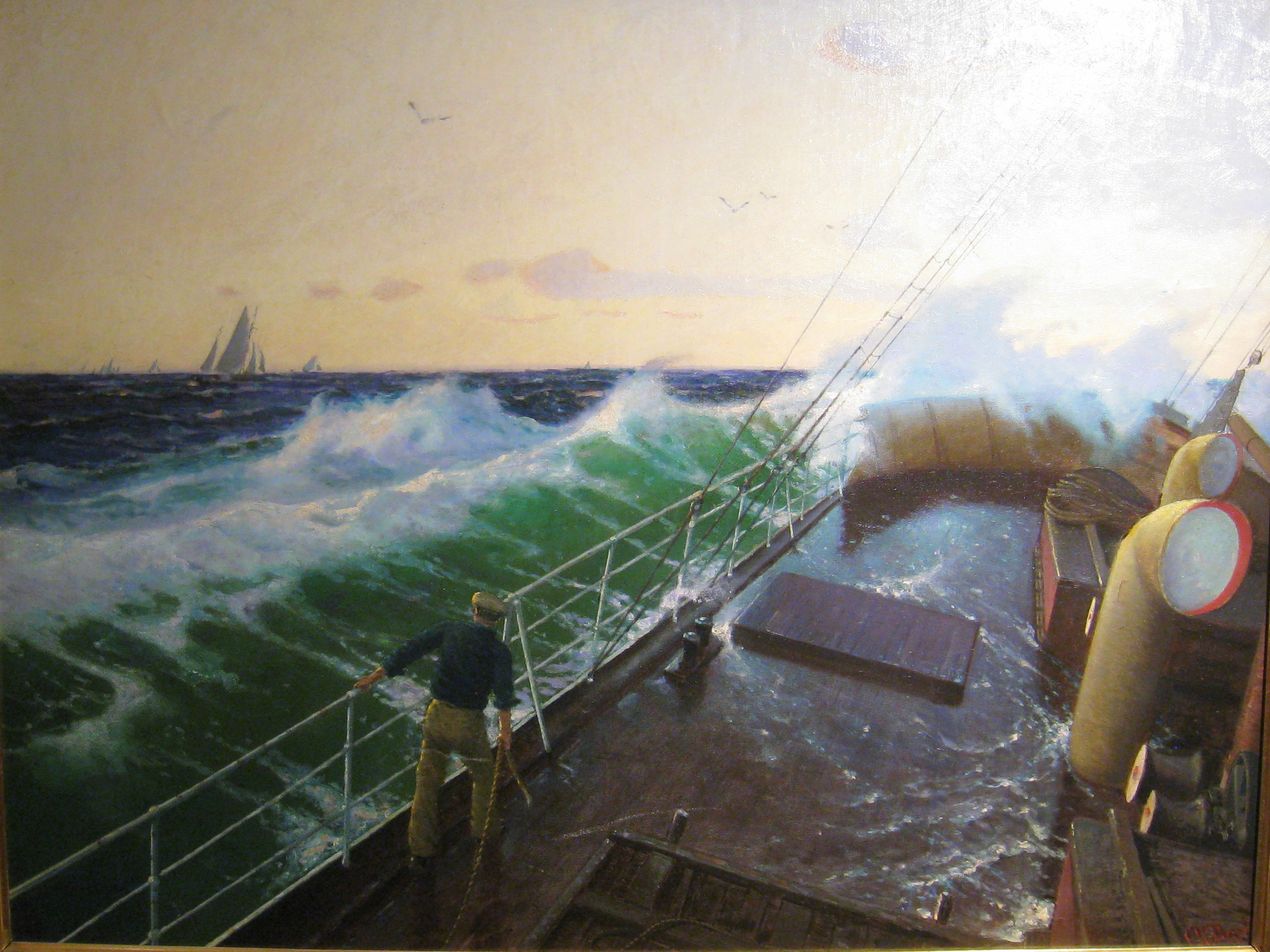
I Skip I Rom Sjø
Carl Wilhelm Barth

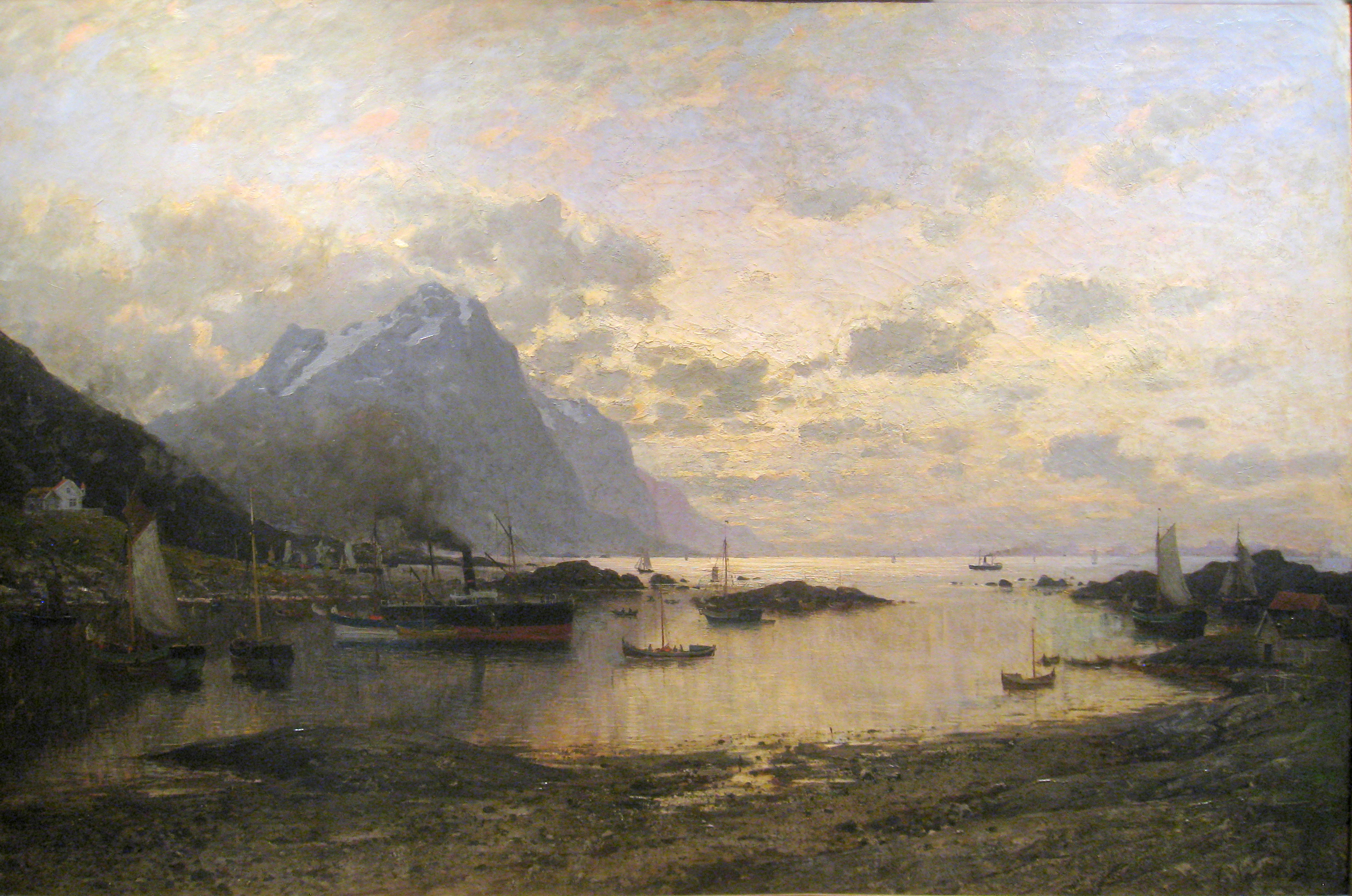
Dampskipsanløp I Lofoten
Eilert Adelsteen Normann
