= Fram (ship) =

Norwegian polar exploration vessel

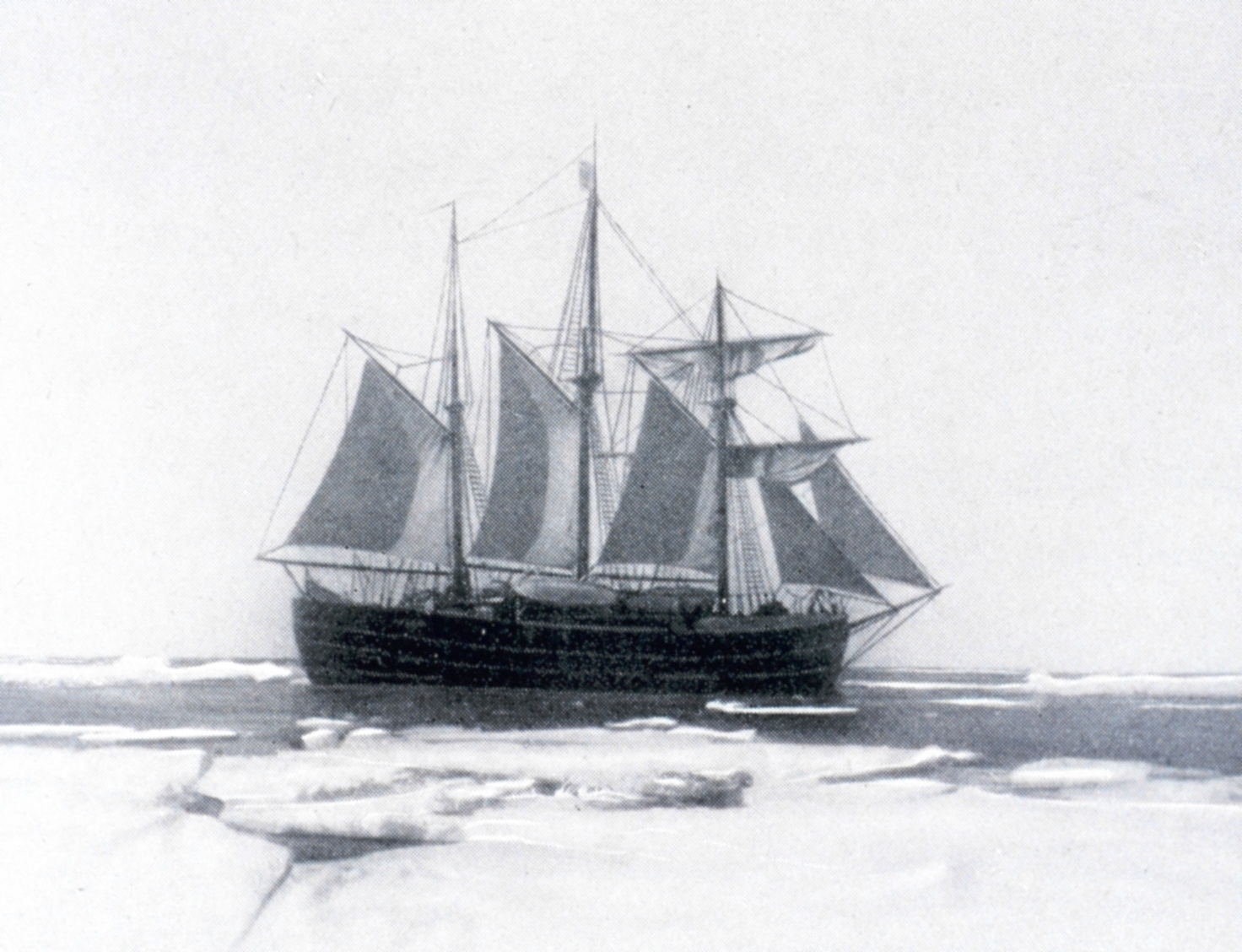
- Fram in Antarctica during Roald Amundsen's expedition

History

Norway
- Name: Fram
- Builder: Colin Archer, Larvik, Norway
- Launched: 26 October 1892
- In service: 1893
- Out of service: 1912
- Status: Preserved; on display at the Fram Museum, Oslo

General characteristics
- Type: Schooner
- Tonnage: 402 GRT
- Length: 127 ft 8 in (38.9 m)
- Beam: 34 ft (10.36 m)
- Draft: 15 ft (4.57 m)
- Propulsion: Triple-expansion steam engine, 220 hp (164 kW); Sails
- Speed: 7 knots (13 km/h; 8.1 mph)
- Complement: 16

Fram ('Forward') is a ship that was used in expeditions of the Arctic and Antarctic regions by the Norwegian explorers Fridtjof Nansen, Otto Sverdrup, Oscar Wisting, and Roald Amundsen between 1893 and 1912. It was designed and built by the Scottish-Norwegian shipwright Colin Archer for Fridtjof Nansen's 1893 Arctic expedition in which the plan was to freeze Fram into the Arctic ice sheet and float with it over the North Pole.

Fram is preserved as a museum ship at the Fram Museum in Oslo, Norway.

== Construction ==
Nansen's ambition was to explore the Arctic farther north than anyone else—to the North Pole, if possible. To do that, he would have to deal with a problem that many sailing on the polar ocean had encountered before him: the freezing ice could crush a ship. Nansen's idea was to build a ship that could survive the pressure, not by pure strength, but because it would be of a shape designed to let the ice push the ship up, so it would "float" on top of the ice.

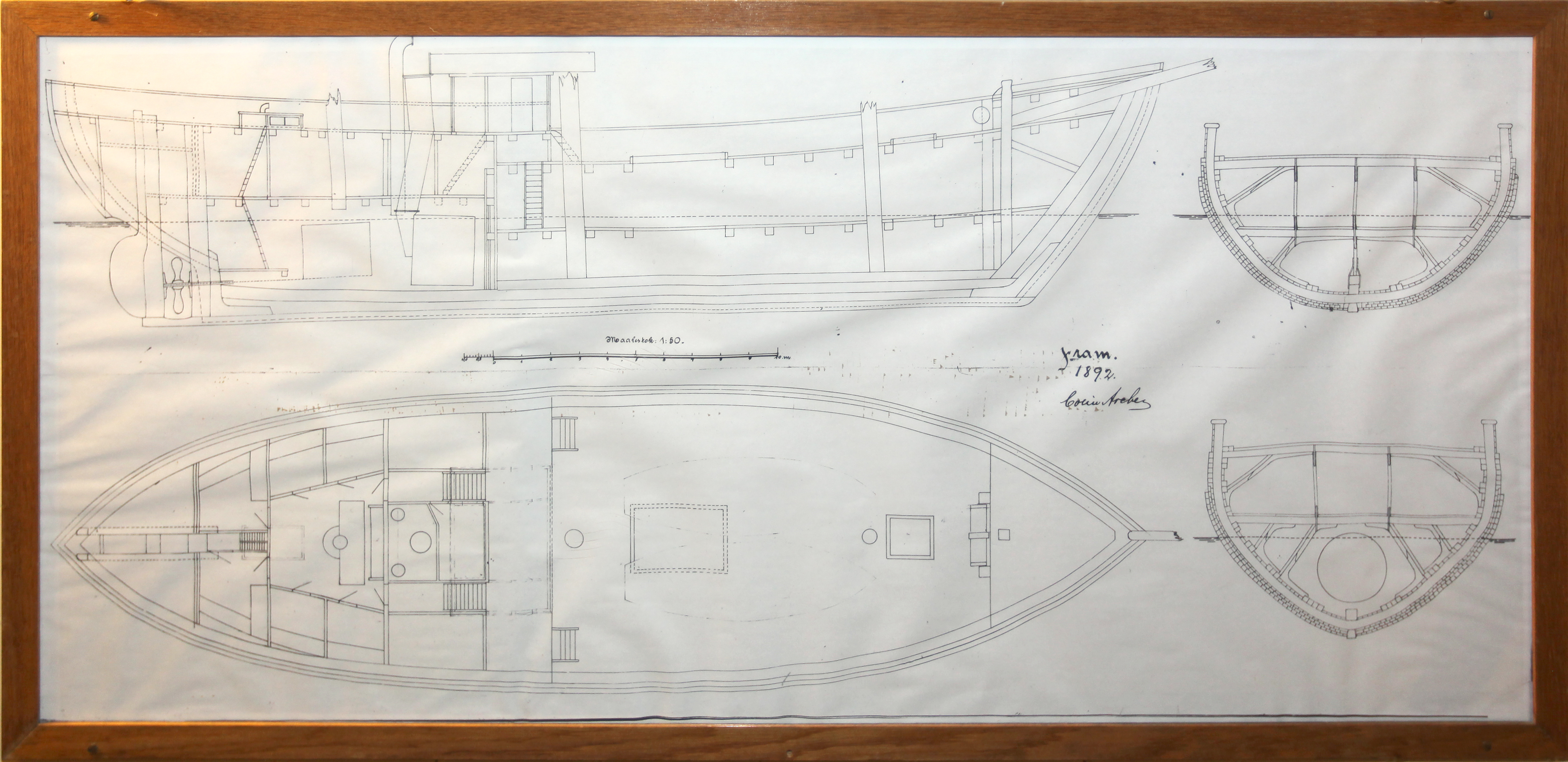
Engineering drawings

Fram is a three-masted schooner with a total length of 39 metres (127 ft 11 in) and width of 11 metres (36 ft 1 in). The ship is both unusually wide and unusually shallow in order to better withstand the forces of pressing ice. A disadvantage of this design is that it rolled more than most ships in heavy seas.

Nansen commissioned the shipwright Colin Archer from Larvik to construct a vessel with these characteristics. Fram was built with an outer layer of greenheart wood to withstand the ice and with almost no keel to handle the shallow waters Nansen expected to encounter. The rudder and propeller were designed to be retracted. The ship was also carefully insulated to allow the crew to live on board for up to five years. The ship also included a windmill, which ran a generator to provide electric power for lighting by electric arc lamps.

Initially, Fram was fitted with a steam engine. Prior to Amundsen's expedition to the South Pole in 1910, the engine was replaced with a diesel engine, a first for polar exploration vessels. The new engine allowed for a longer voyage without refueling.

Fram's original name pennant, first flown on the ship during her launch

The ship was launched on 26 October 1892.

== Historical expeditions ==
Fram was used in several expeditions:

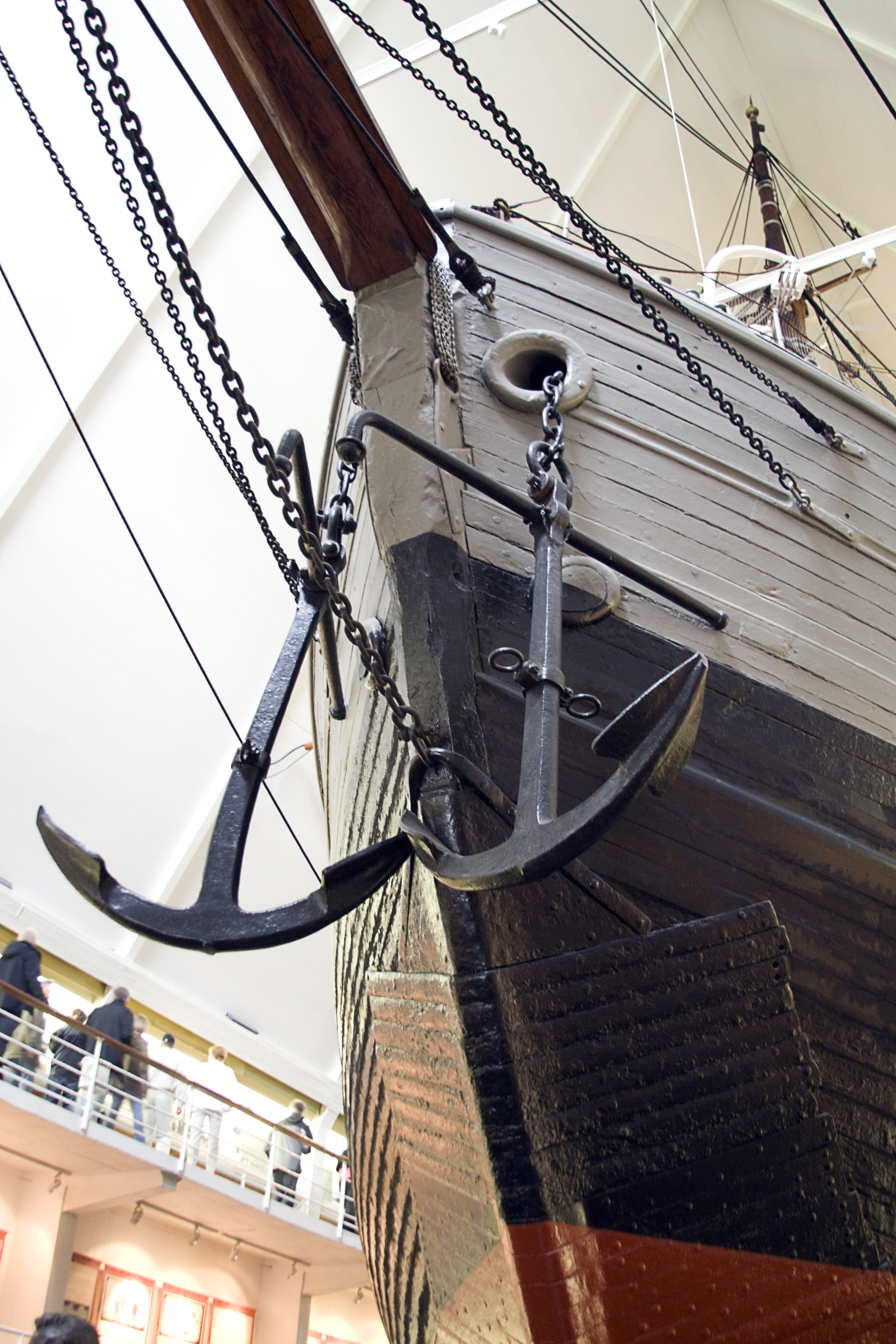
The prow of Fram, as seen in the Fram Museum in 2010

=== Nansen's 1893–1896 Arctic expedition ===
Wreckage found at Greenland from USS Jeannette, which was lost off Siberia, and driftwood found in the regions of Svalbard and Greenland, suggested that an ocean current flowed beneath the Arctic ice sheet from east to west, bringing driftwood from the Siberian region to Svalbard and further west. Nansen had Fram built in order to explore this theory.

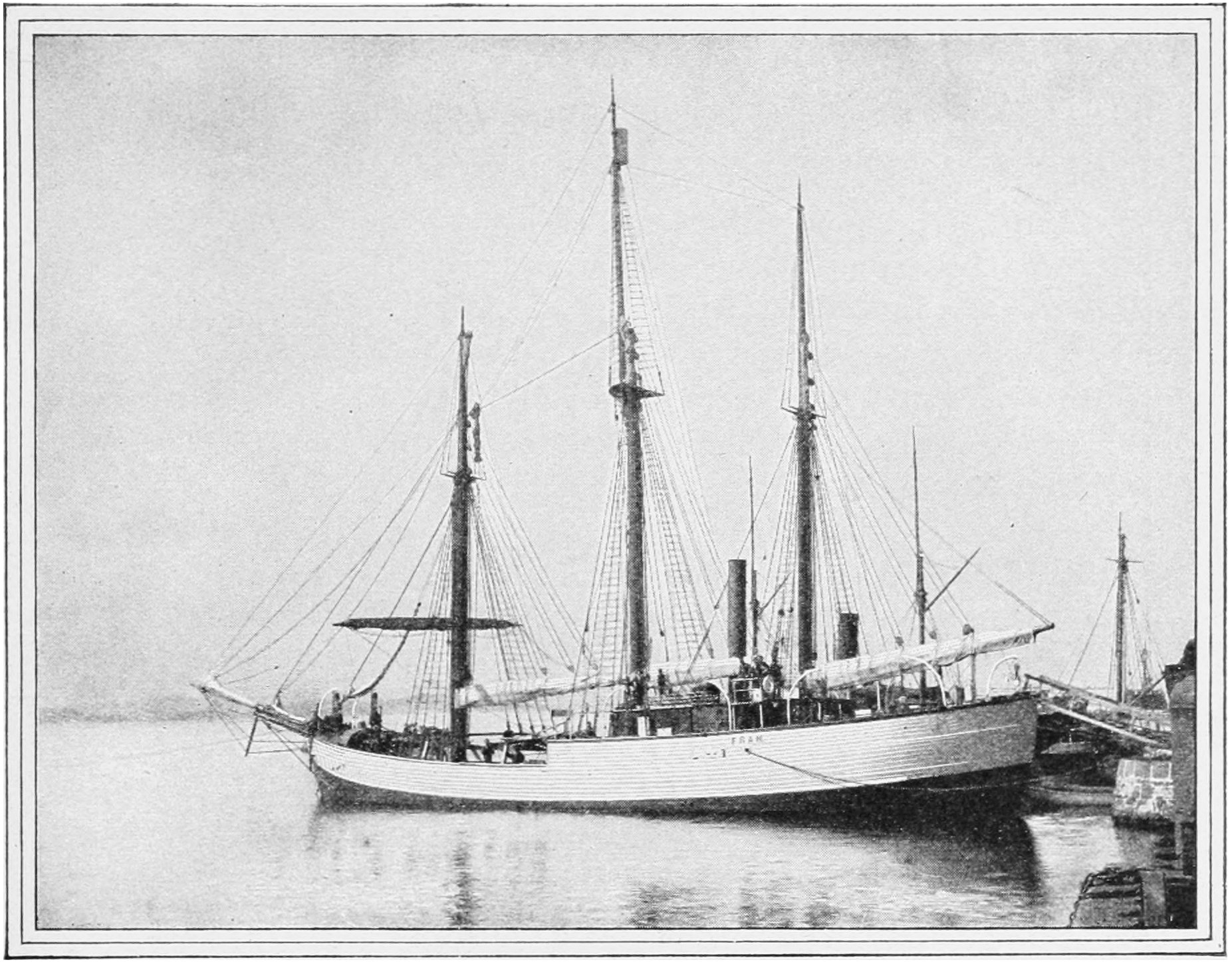
Fram in port, circa 1900

He undertook an expedition that came to last three years. When Nansen realised that Fram would not reach the North Pole directly by the force of the current, he and Hjalmar Johansen set out to reach it on skis. After reaching 86° 14' north, he had to turn back to spend the winter at Franz Josef Land. Nansen and Johansen survived on walrus and polar bear meat and blubber. Finally meeting British explorers, the Jackson–Harmsworth expedition, they arrived back in Norway only days before the Fram also returned there. The ship had spent nearly three years trapped in the ice, reaching 85° 57' N.

=== Sverdrup's 1898–1902 Canadian Arctic islands expedition ===
Fram on the high seas, 1910. The ship's round hull and lack of a keel made it roll significantly.

In 1898, Otto Sverdrup, who had brought Fram back on the first Arctic voyage, led a scientific expedition to the Canadian Arctic Archipelago. Fram was slightly modified for this journey, its freeboard being increased. Fram left harbour on 24 June 1898, with 17 men on board. Their aim was to chart the lands of the Arctic Islands, and to sample the geology, flora and fauna. The expeditions lasted until 1902, leading to charts covering 260,000 km^{2} (100,000 sq mi), more than any other Arctic expedition.

=== Amundsen's 1910–1912 South Pole expedition ===
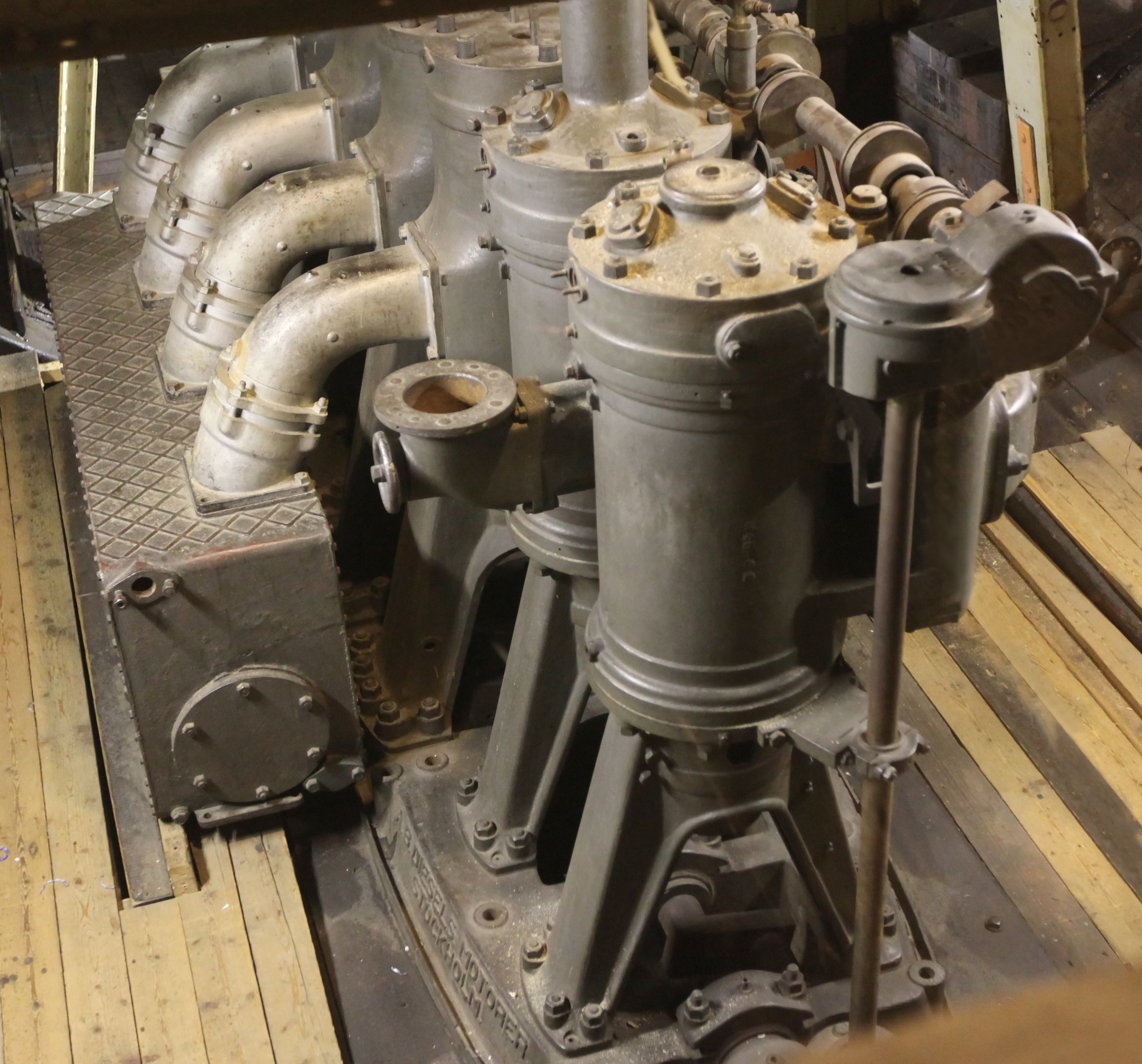
For Amundsen's South Pole expedition, Fram was fitted with this diesel engine

Fram's name pennant during Amundsen's expedition

Fram was used by Roald Amundsen in his southern polar expedition from 1910 to 1912, the first to reach the South Pole, during which Fram reached 78° 41' S.

== Preservation of Fram ==
The ship was left to decay in storage from 1912 until the late 1920s, when Lars Christensen, Otto Sverdrup and Oscar Wisting initiated efforts to preserve it via the Fram Committee. In 1935, the ship was installed in the Fram Museum, where it now stands.

== Named after Fram ==
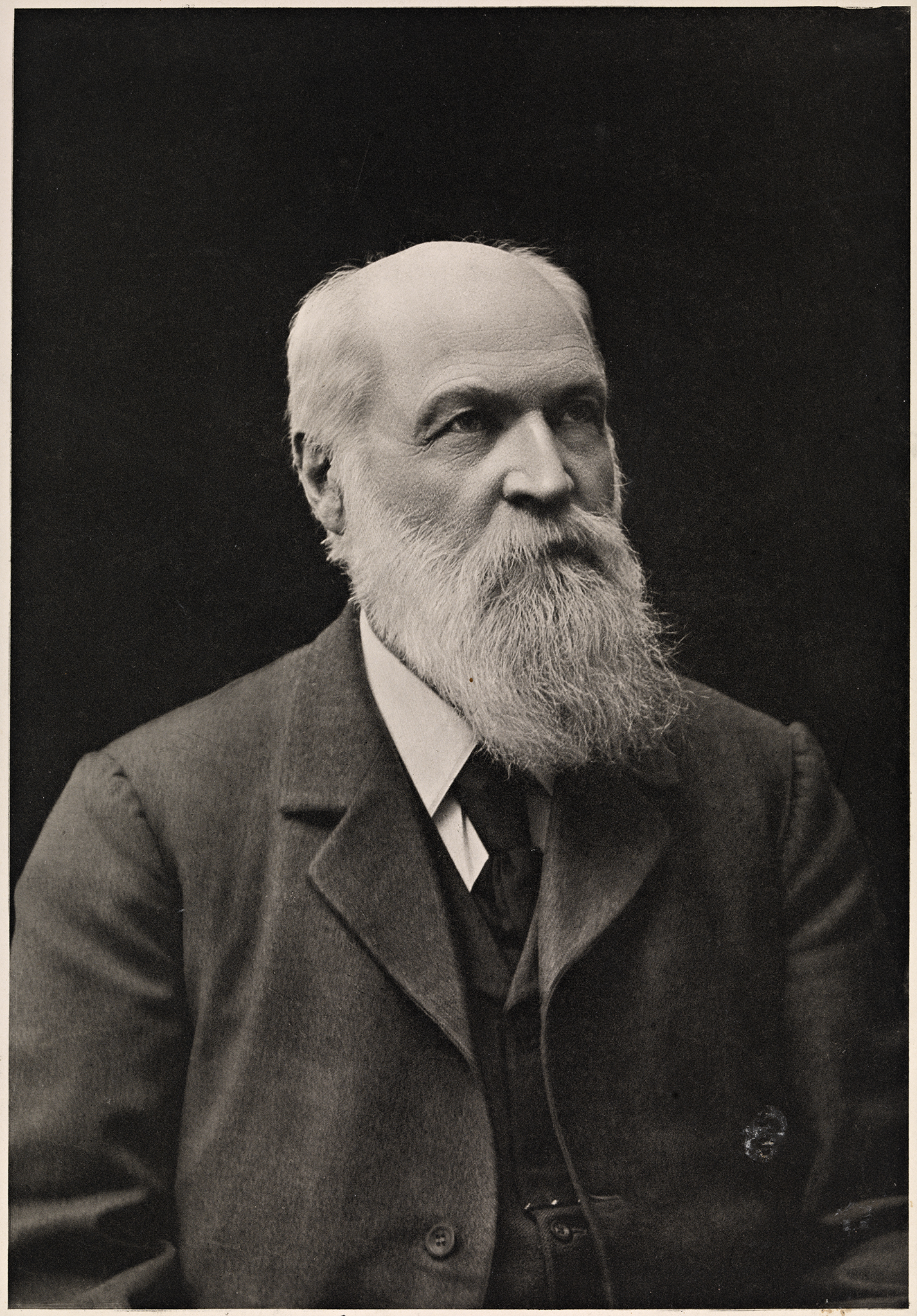
Scottish–Norwegian shipwright Colin Archer designed the ship

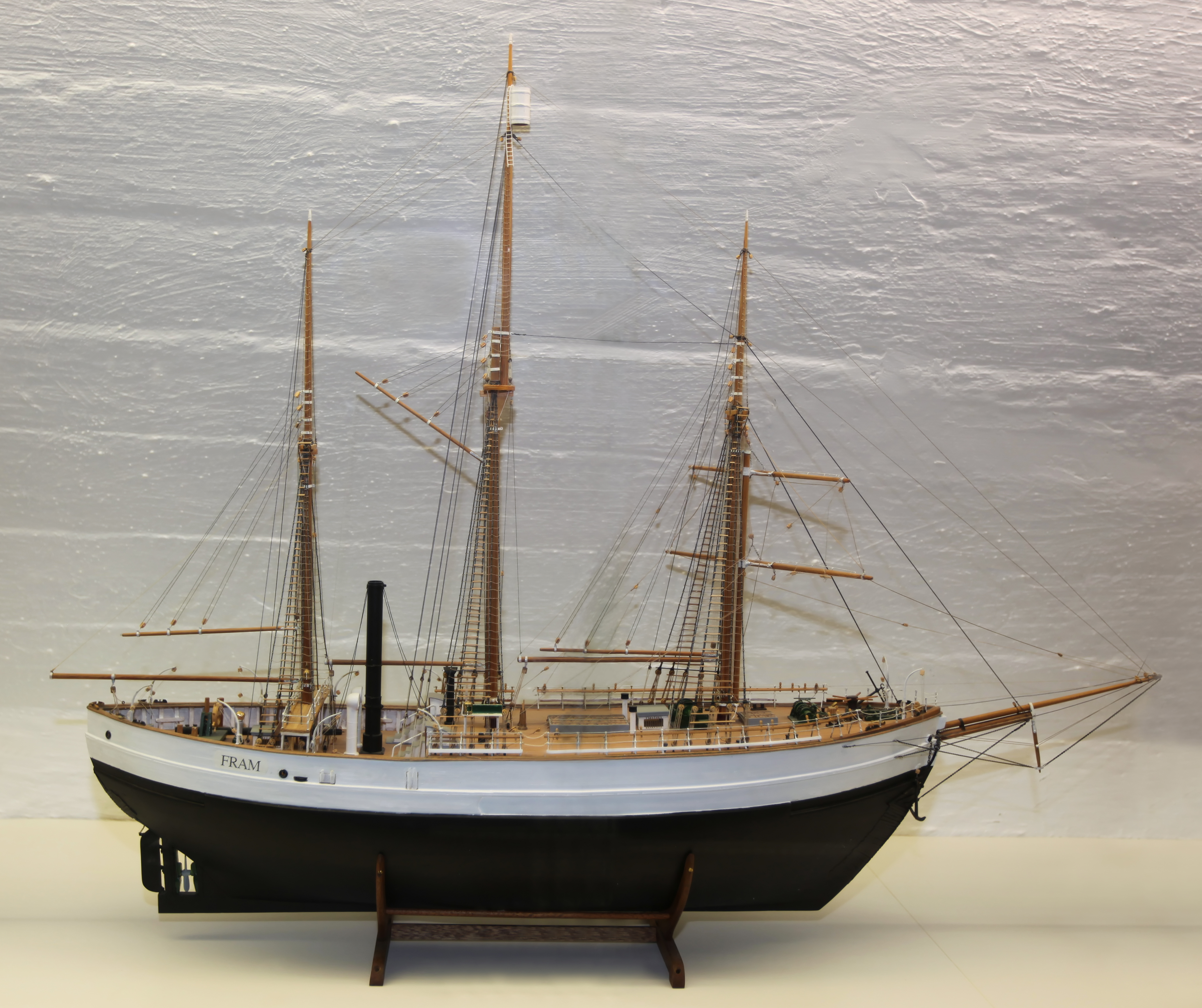
Fram model

- Fram Island (Ostrov Frama), an island close to the Komsomolskaya Pravda Islands, Laptev Sea
- Fram Islands, a group of islands off the coast of Antarctica
- Fram mesa, a plateau in Antarctica
- Fram Formation, a rock formation on Ellesmere Island in northern Canada known for being where Tiktaalik roseae was discovered
- MS Fram, a cruise ship which tours polar regions
- Framheim (literally "Home of the Fram"), Amundsen's Base at the Bay of Whales in Antarctica during his quest for the South Pole
- Fram Rupes, an escarpment on Mercury
- Fram crater, a small crater on Mars, visited by the Mars Exploration Rover Opportunity in 2004
- Fram Basin, the deepest point in the Arctic Ocean
- Fram Strait, a passage from the Arctic Ocean to the Greenland Sea and Norwegian Sea, between Greenland and Spitsbergen
- Fram, a play by Tony Harrison, premièred at the National Theatre London, 2008
- In Arthur Ransome's children's book, Winter Holiday, the children use the name Fram for their Uncle Jim's houseboat, trapped in the ice on the lake which becomes the inspiration for some of their adventures
- The Adventures of Fram, the Polar Bear (Romanian: Aventurile lui Fram, ursul polar), a children's book written by the Romanian author Cezar Petrescu which was also made into a TV series in Romania
- Fram2, a 2025 SpaceX mission on the Crew Dragon spacecraft, and the first crewed spaceflight to pass over the Earth's poles
- FramSat-1, a 2026 CubeSat, the first Norwegian satellite launched from Norwegian soil

== See also ==
- List of Antarctic exploration ships from the Heroic Age, 1897–1922
- List of museum ships
  - RRS Discovery, the only surviving Arctic exploration vessel besides Fram
