= Norwegian Museum of Cultural History =

Museum in Oslo, Norway

Coordinates: 59°54′24.88″N 10°41′9.45″E

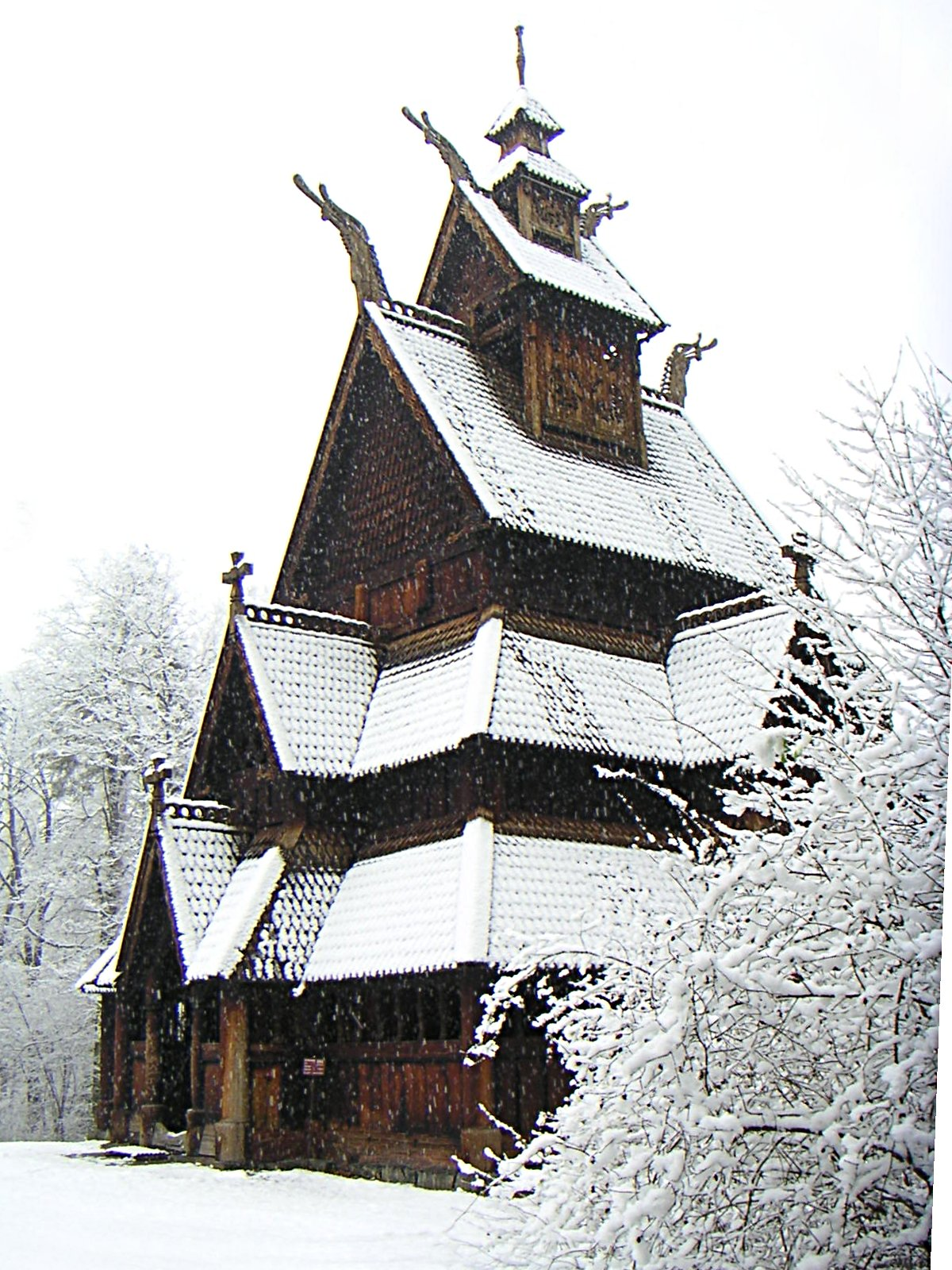
Gol Stave Church re-erected in 1885 in the open-air museum of Oscar II

Norsk Folkemuseum (Norwegian Museum of Cultural History), at Bygdøy, Oslo, Norway, is a museum of cultural history with extensive collections of artifacts from all social groups and all regions of the country. It also incorporates a large open-air museum with more than 150 buildings, relocated from towns and rural districts.

The Norwegian Museum of Cultural History is situated on the Bygdøy peninsula near several other museums, including the Viking Ship Museum; the Fram Museum; the Kon-Tiki Museum; and the Norwegian Maritime Museum.

== History ==
Norsk Folkemuseum was established in 1894 by librarian and historian Hans Aall (1869–1946). It acquired the core area of its present property in 1898. After having built temporary exhibition buildings and re-erected a number of rural buildings, the museum could open its gates to the public in 1901. In 1907, the collections of King Oscar II, on the neighbouring site, was incorporated into the museum. Its five relocated buildings, with the Gol Stave Church in the centre, is recognized as the world's first open-air museum, founded in 1881.

Hans Aall was the director until his death in 1946. Under his leadership the museum experienced a substantial growth of its area, staff, collections, buildings and number of visitors. Reidar Kjellberg (1904–1978) became Director of the museum in 1947 and remained museum director until he retired, in 1974. From 1990 until 2000, Erik Rudeng was the director. The director since 2020 has been Nina Refseth.

Among the museum's more significant buildings are the 13th-century Gol Stave Church, which was incorporated into the Norsk Folkemuseum in 1907. The Gol Stave Church is one of five medieval buildings at the museum, which also includes the 14th-century Rauland farmhouse (Raulandstua) and the 1865 tenement building relocated from 15 Wessels gate in Oslo. Seven of the nine flats show typical interiors from various periods of the 19th and 20th centuries, including a flat inhabited by an immigrant family from Pakistan as it was furnished in 2002. In 1951, the Sami collections in the Ethnographic Museum of the University of Oslo were transferred to the Norsk Folkemuseum.

The museum also possesses a large photographic archive, including a significant portion of the works of noted photographer Anders Beer Wilse (1865–1949). In 2004, the administration of the adjacent Bygdøy Royal Estate was transferred to the museum. Throughout its existence, research has focused on building and furniture, clothing and textiles, technical and social culture, agriculture, working memory and Sami culture.

== Gallery ==
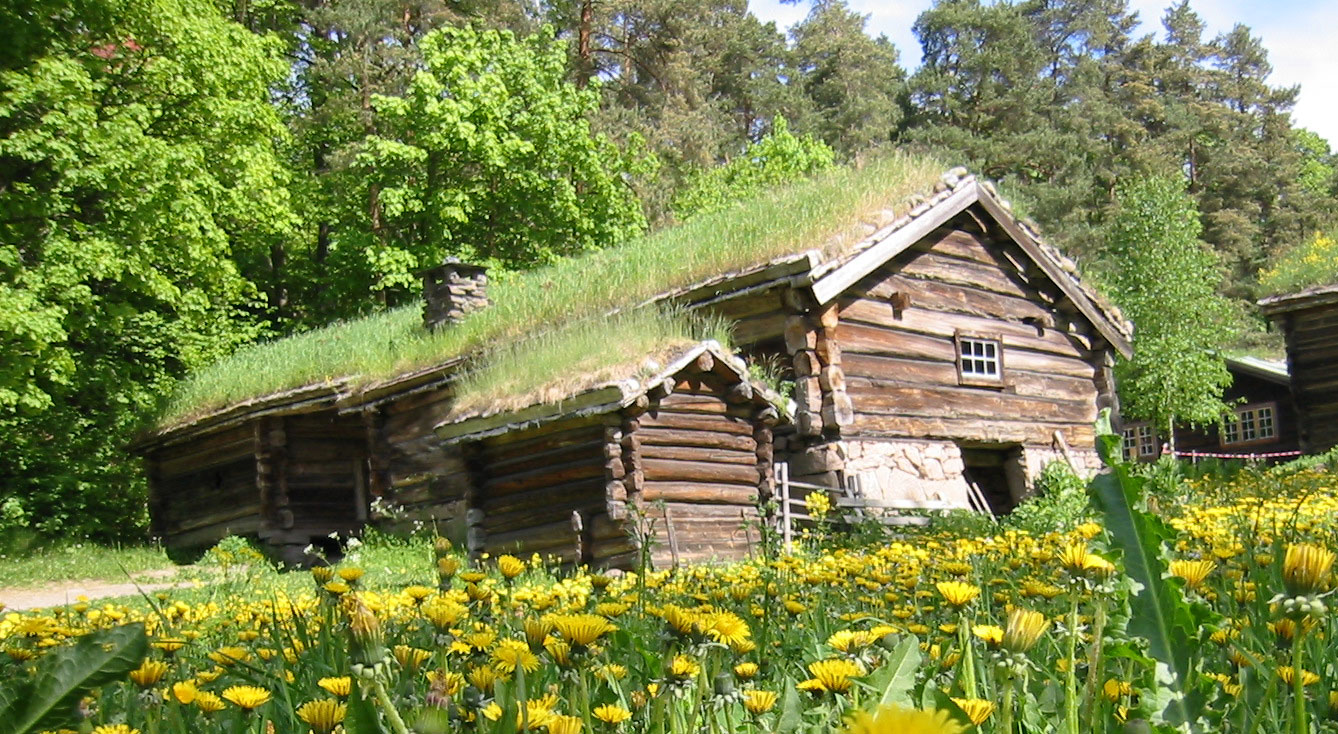
Log houses in the farmstead from Østerdal

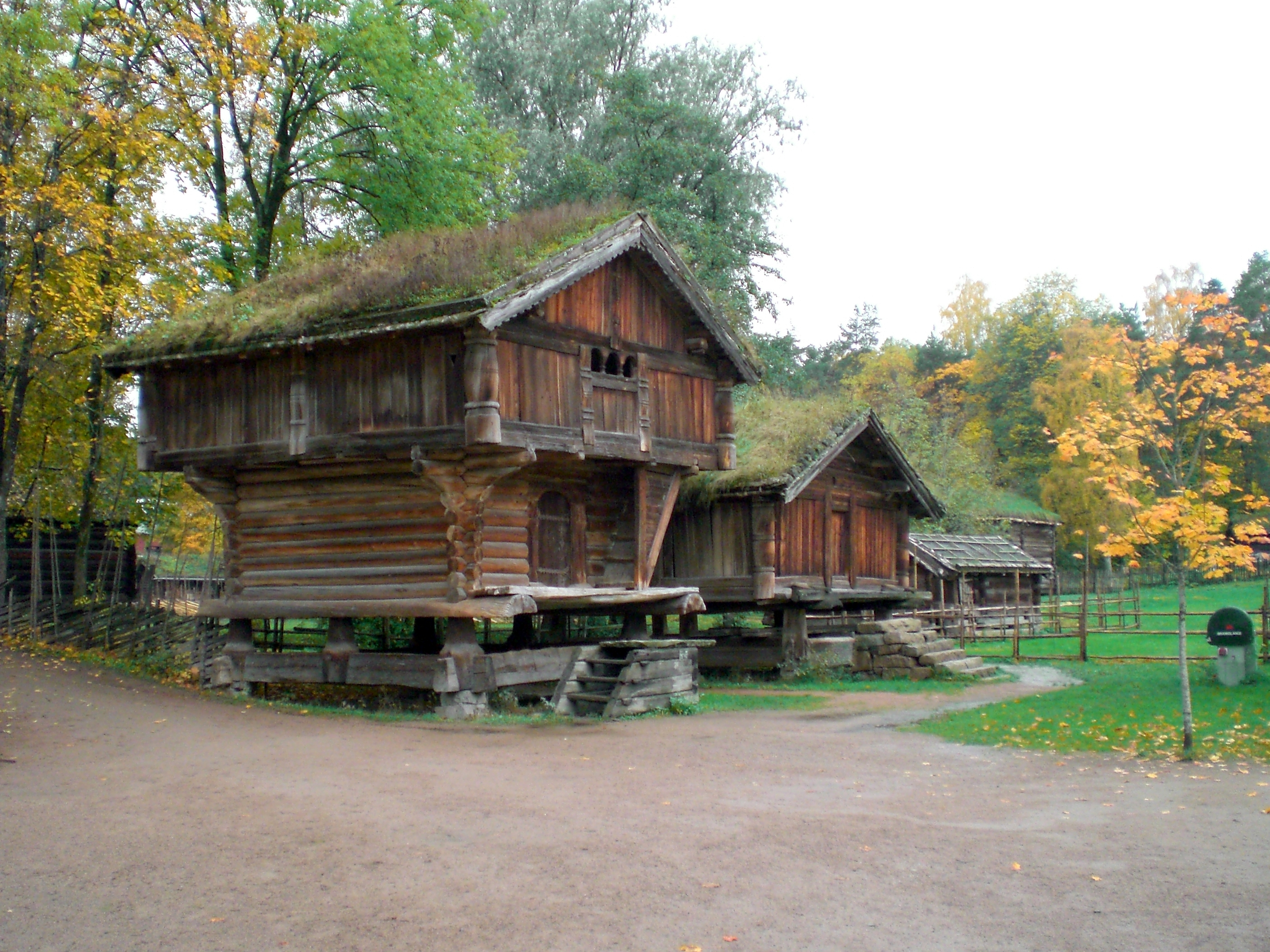
Historic buildings from Hovin and Gransherad in Telemark

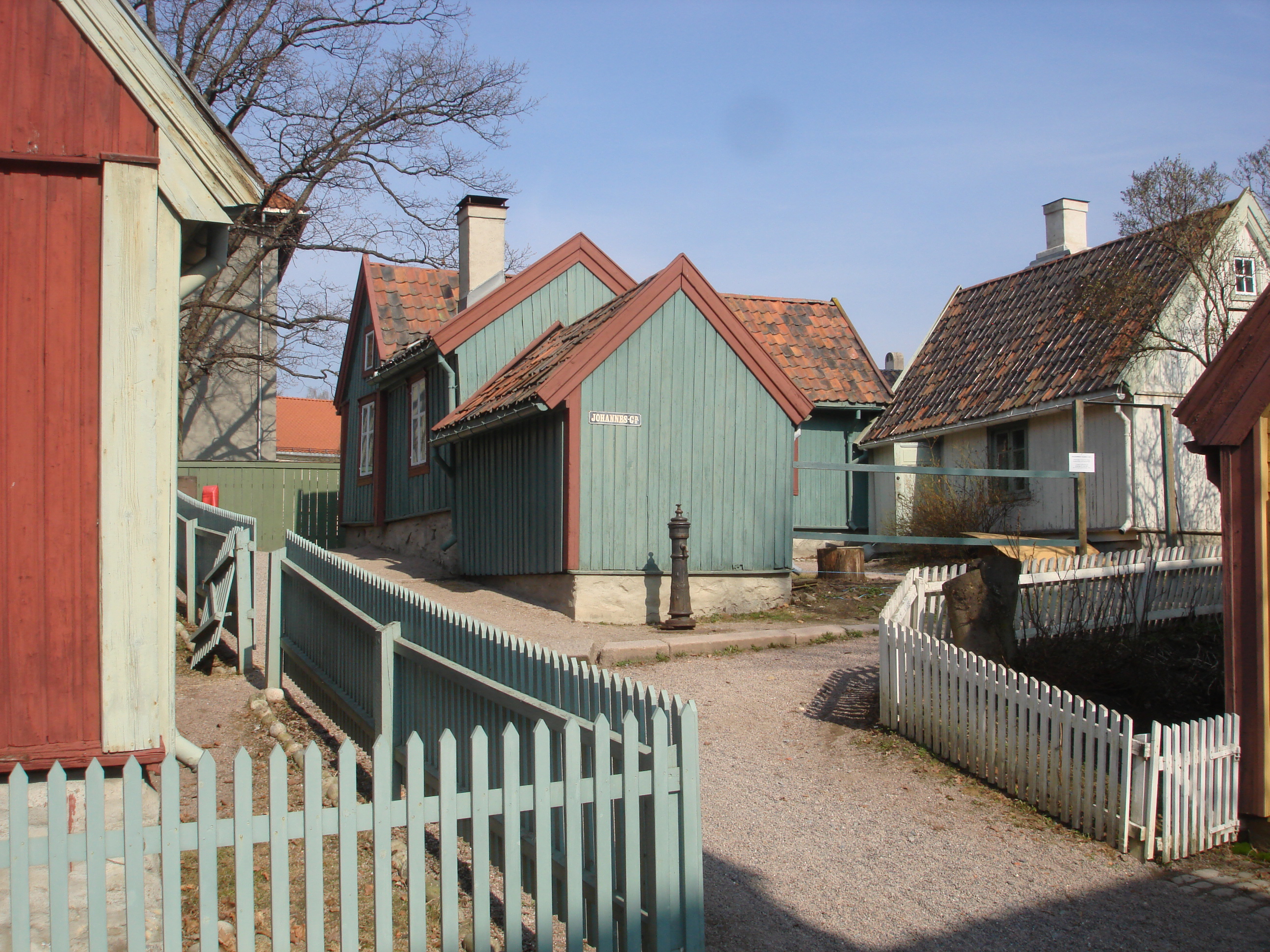
Working class houses from the former settlement of Enerhaugen in Oslo

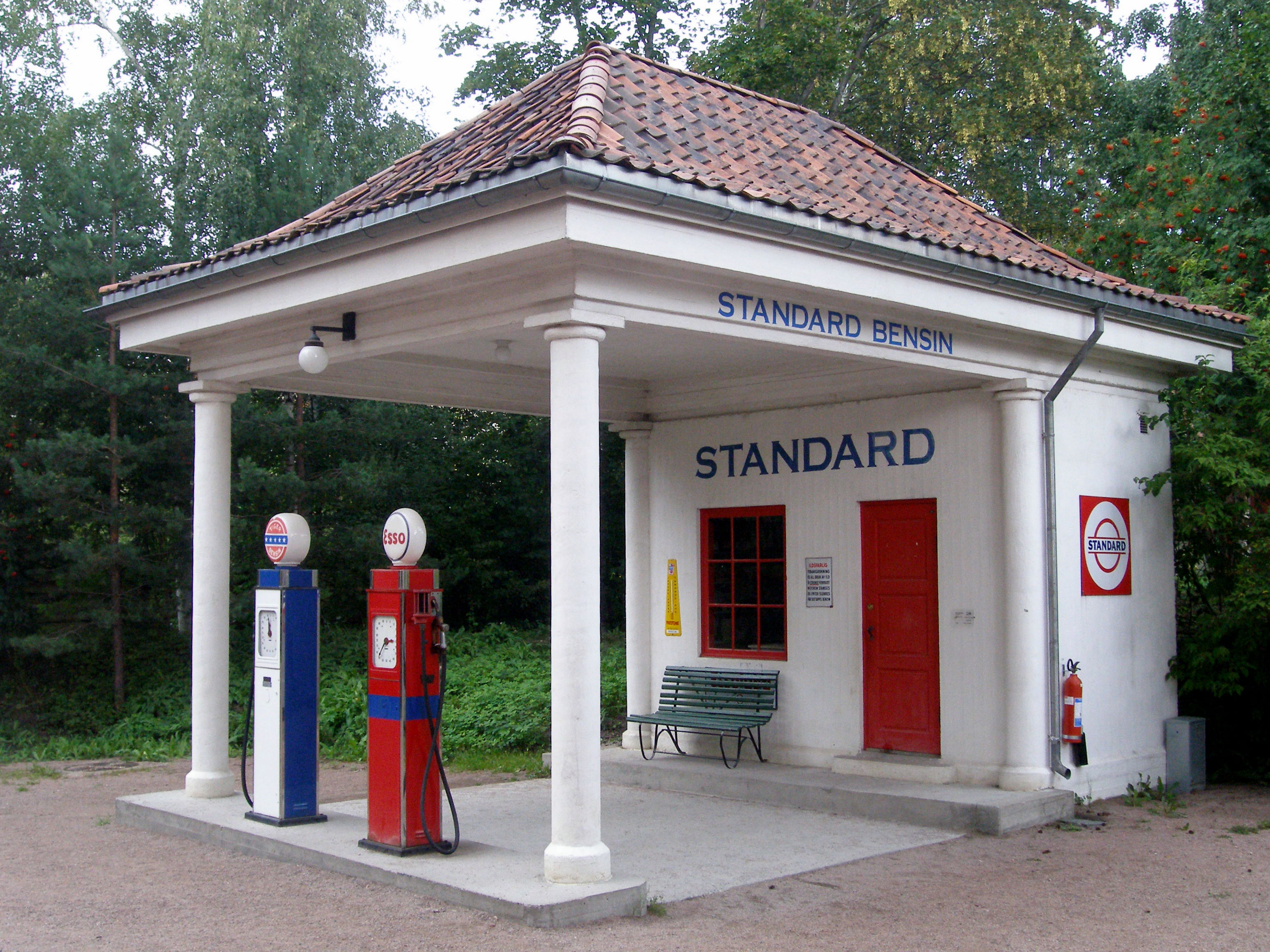
Standard Oil gas station of 1928 relocated from Holmestrand Municipality

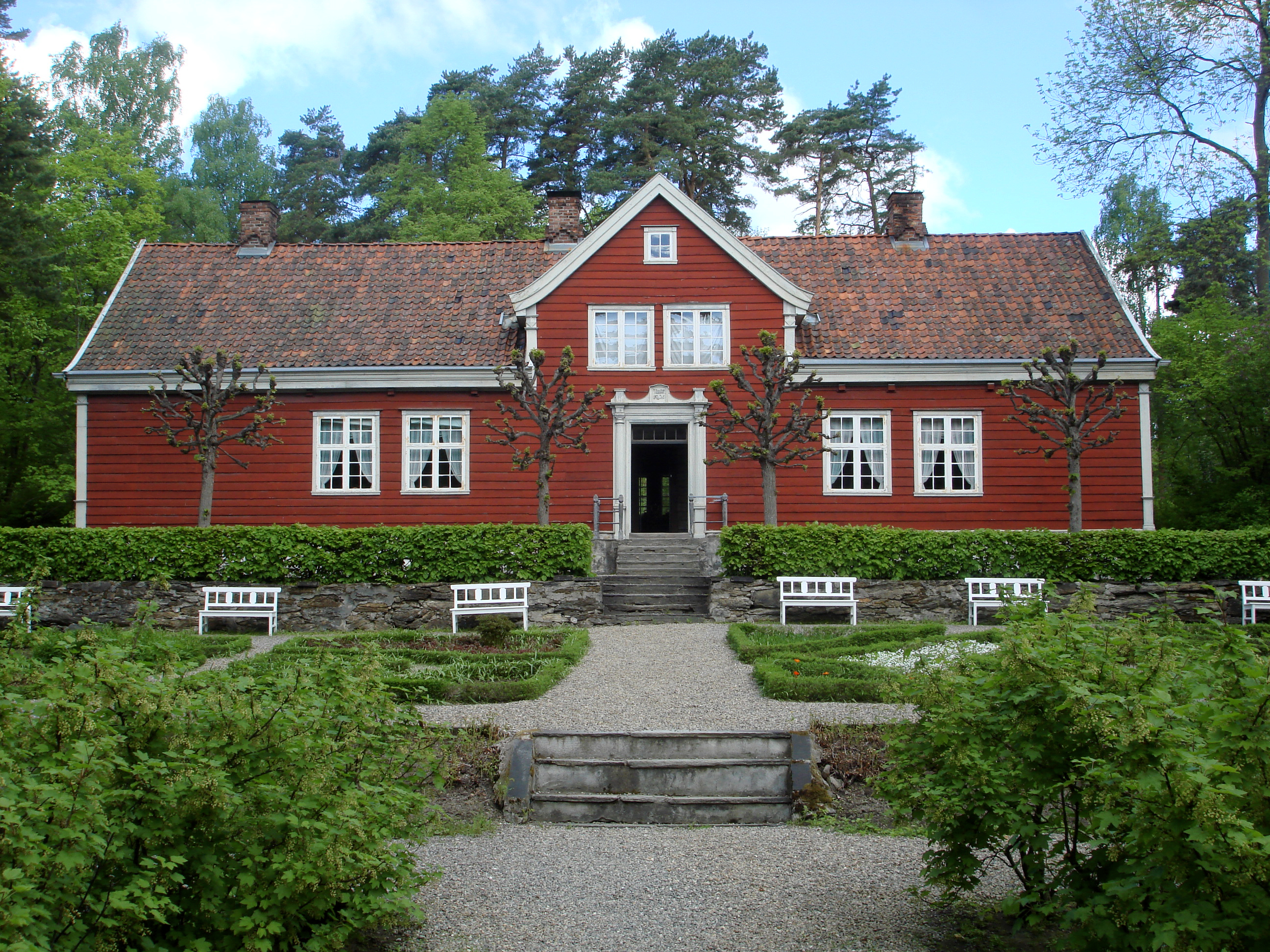
Vicarage from Leikanger Church

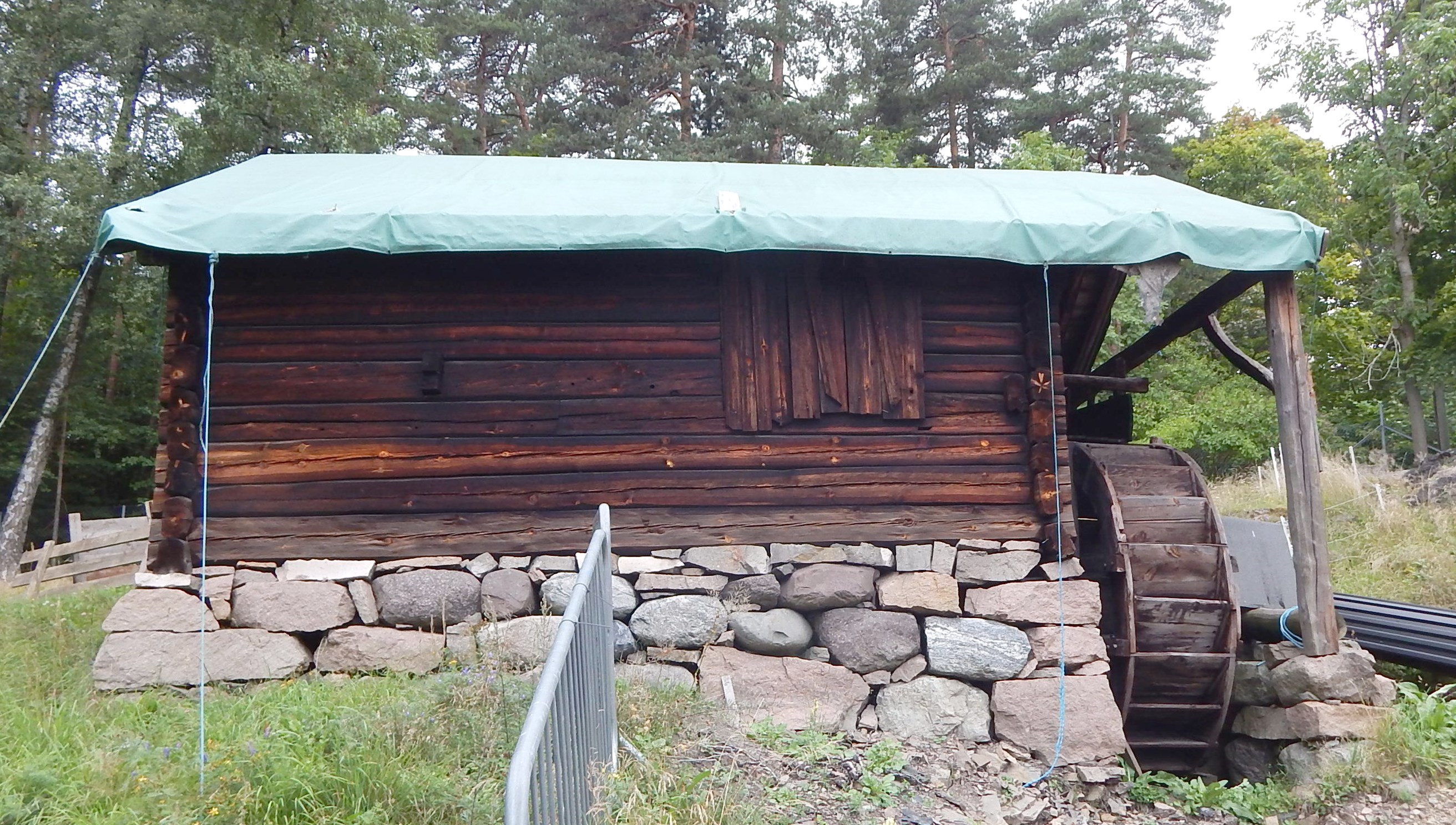
Stamp mill from Stordal

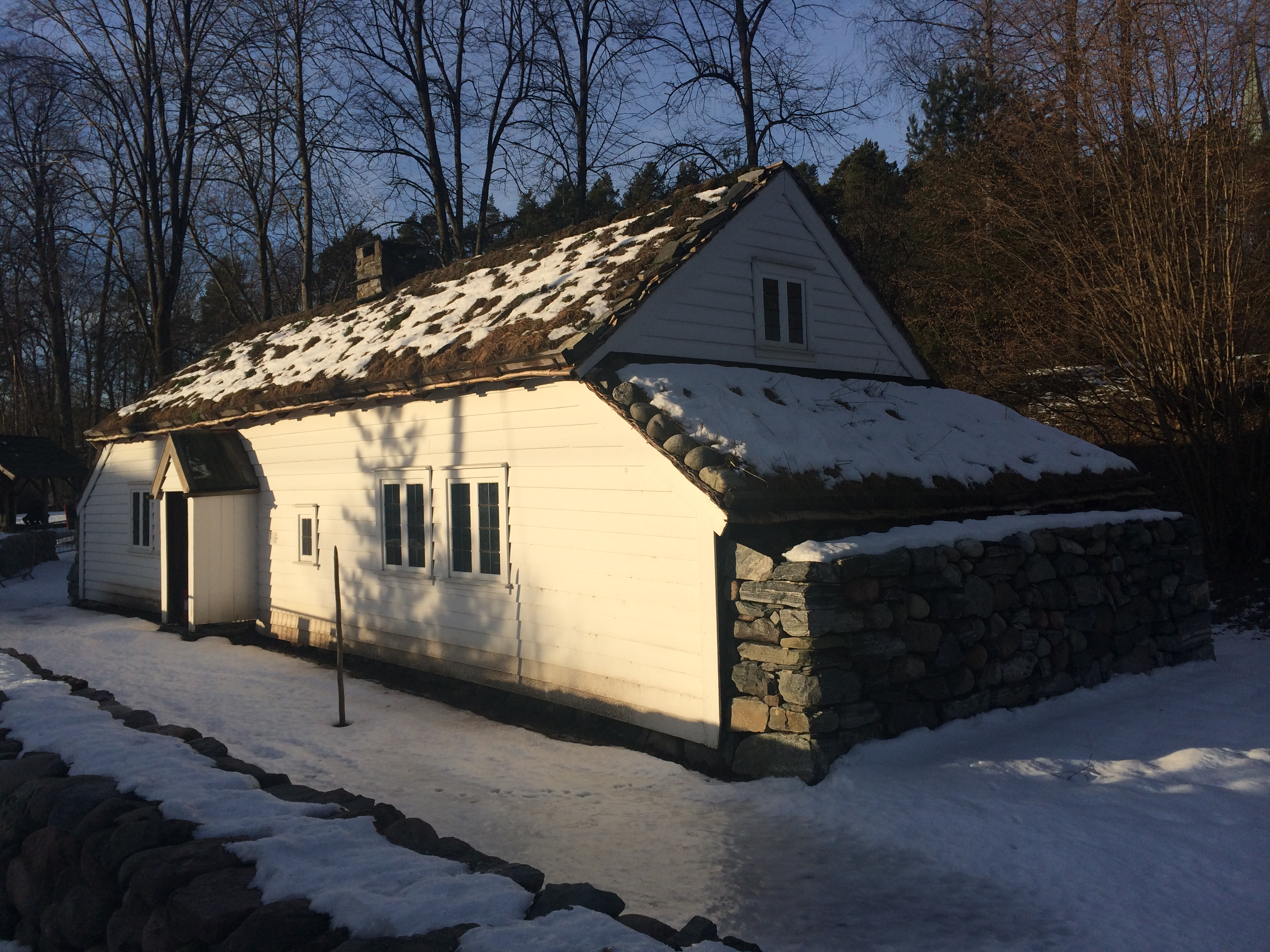
Typical 19th century house from Lista

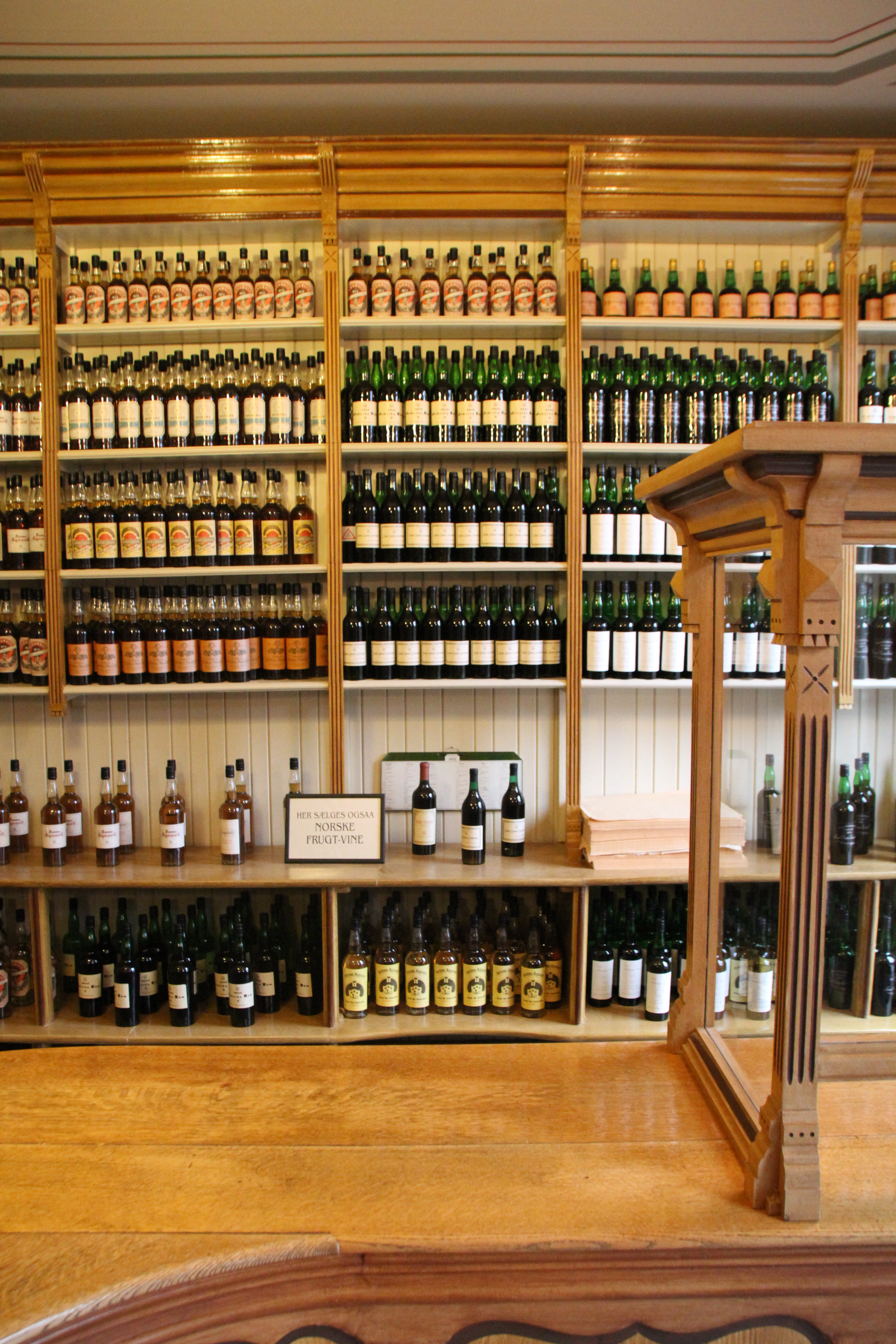
A Samlaget liquor store from Holmestrand (1904)

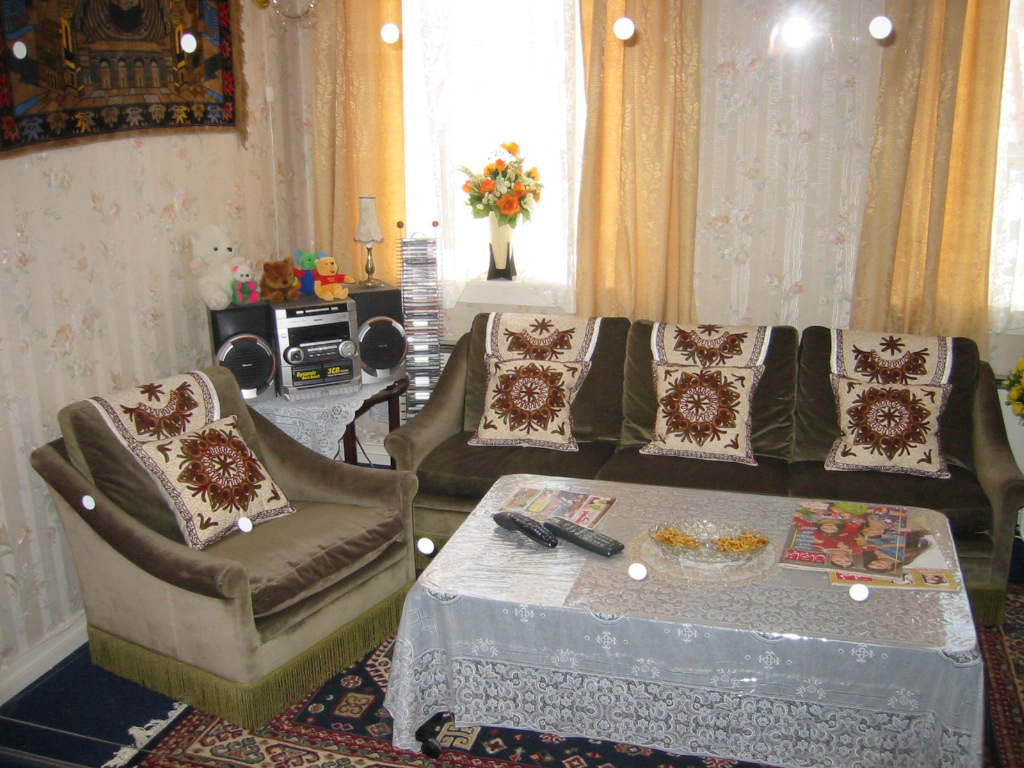
Pakistani home of 2002 in the tenement building from 1865.

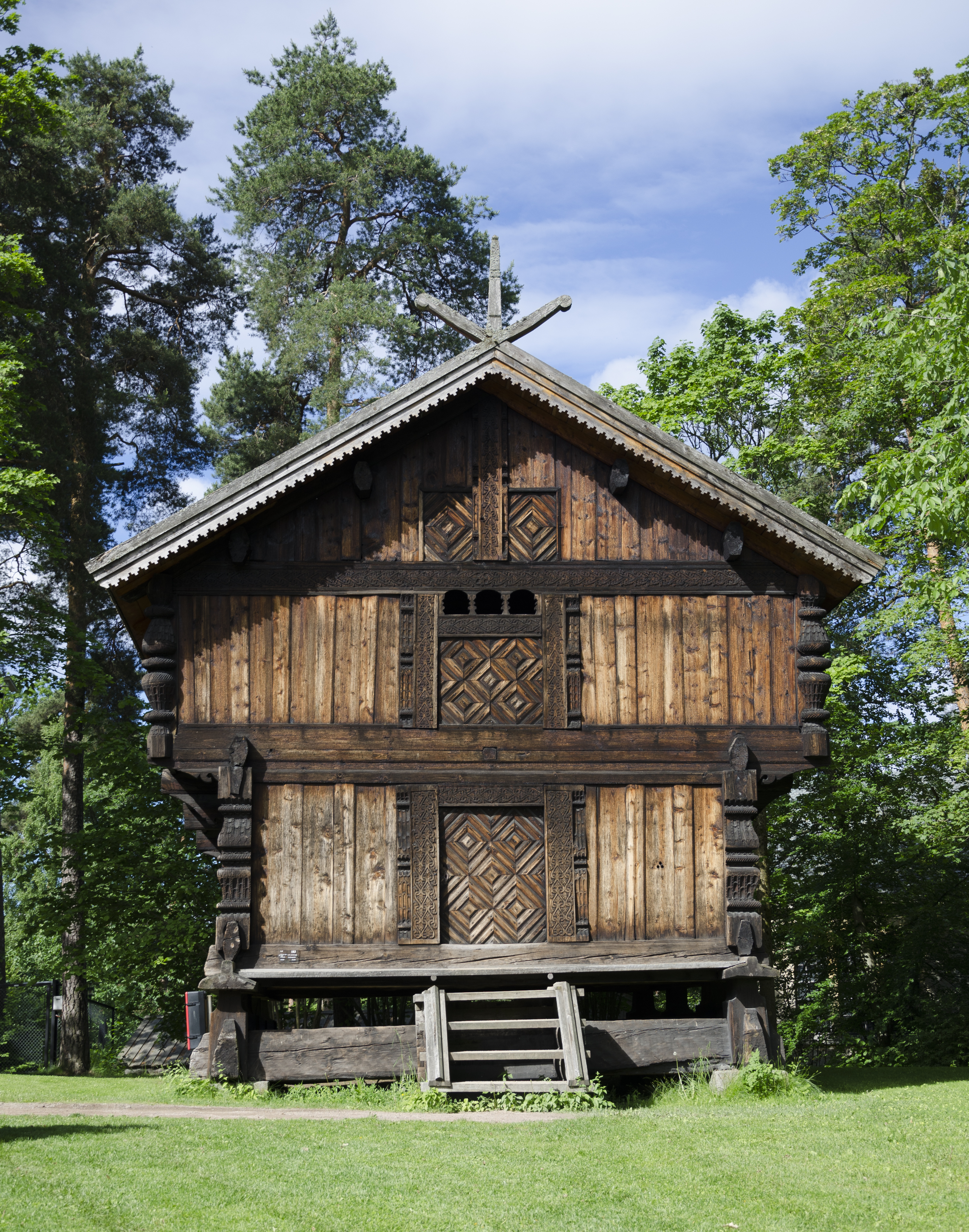
Loft from Telemark, built ca. 1750–60.

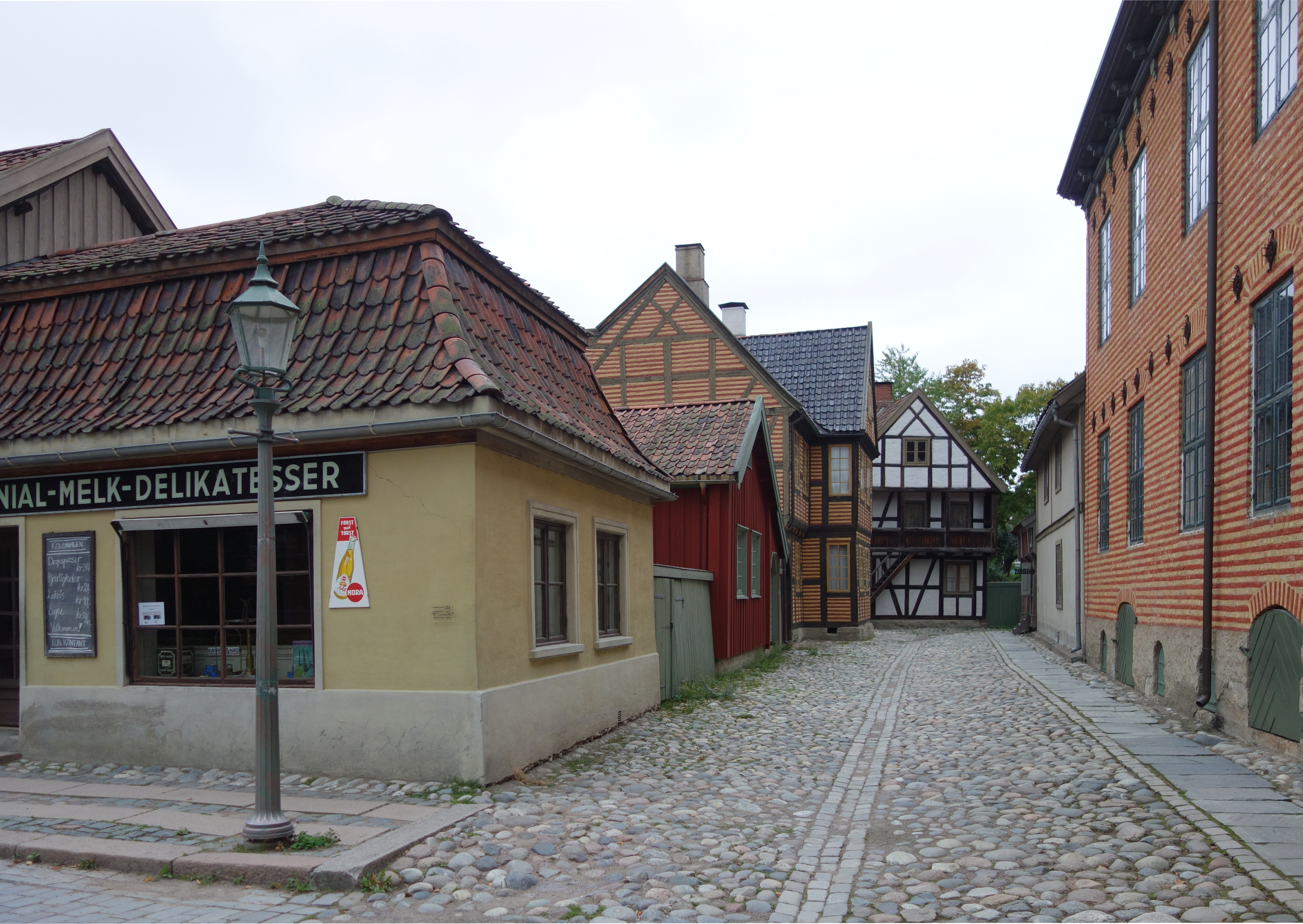
Street in the "Old Town" section of Norsk Folkemuseum

== Sources ==
- Hegard, Tonte Hans Aall – mannen, visjonen og verket (1994) ISBN 82-7631-023-0
- Tschudi-Madsen, Stephan, På nordmanns vis : Norsk folkemuseum gjennom 100 år (1993) ISBN 82-03-16715-2
