= Skarpsno station =

Former railway station in Oslo, Norway

Skarpsno
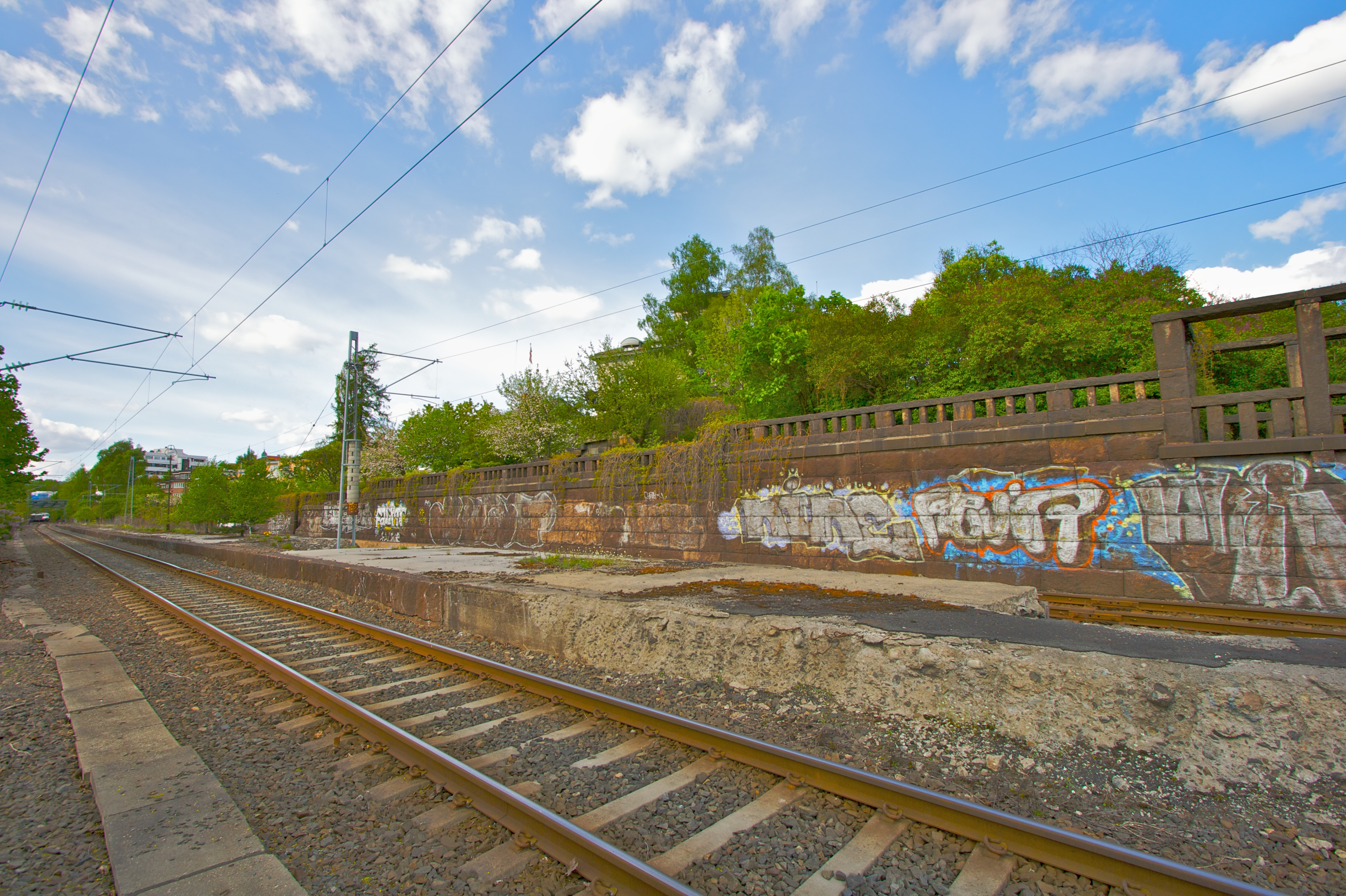
- The remnants of Skarpsno Station, May 2009

General information
- Location: Skarpsno, Oslo; Norway
- Coordinates: 59°54′54″N 10°41′56″E
- Owner: Norwegian State Railways
- Lines: Drammen Line (1882–1980); Skøyen–Filipstad Line (1980–89)
- Distance: 1.90 km (1.18 mi)
- Platforms: 1 island platform
- Tracks: 2

Construction
- Architect: Eivind Gleditsch

History
- Opened: 15 May 1882
- Closed: 28 May 1989
- Rebuilt: 1917
- Electrified: 30 August 1922
Location
- Location within Oslo Location within Norway

Skarpsno station (Norwegian: Skarpsno stasjon) was a railway station situated at Skarpsno in Oslo, Norway. The station was located 1.90 kilometres (1.18 mi) from Oslo West Station (Oslo V) along what was initially the Drammen Line and now is the Skøyen–Filipstad Line. Skarpsno was a local station served by the Oslo Commuter Rail and featured an island platform on an elevated segment.

The station opened on 15 May 1882, ten years after the Drammen Line was taken into use. It received a new station building and platform in 1917, designed by Eivind Gleditsch. The station was staffed until 1968. The Oslo Tunnel opened in 1980, rerouting most traffic away from Oslo V. Both stations closed on 28 May 1989 and the station was demolished in 1993. For a while it had a ferry services to Bygdøy.

== History ==
The plans from 1868 for the Drammen Line called for it to run along Frognerkilen to Pipervika, where it would terminate at Oslo West Station. A consequence of this was that the line would run straight through a fashionable residential area. For the residents, this caused the railway to hinder access to the waterfront, although they were permitted access through level crossings with gates. The Drammen Line opened on 7 October 1872, but Skarpsno Station was not opened until 15 May 1882. During the 1914 Jubilee Exhibition a 1.5-kilometre (0.93 mi) branch line was built from Skarpsno to Frogner, which carried a mixture of trains and trams.

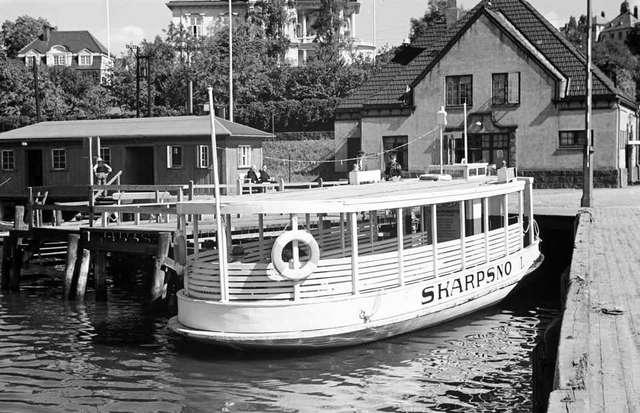
The ferry in front of the station in 1924

The line from Sandvika to Oslo was substantially upgraded between 1917 and 1922. The freight handling was moved from Oslo V to Filipstad and on 26 January 1916 a separate railway line opened from Skarpsno to there. Like many of the stations on the section, Skarpsno was rebuilt as an elevated railway. The tracks were raised, allowing the level crossings to be removed and the roads to run through underpasses. This involved the station being rebuilt so it received an island platform. Eivind Gleditsch at NSB Arktitektkontor designed a new station building, which opened in 1917.

From 27 February 1917 a passing loop was built at Skarpsno and standard gauge traffic was carried out on the northern track. A southern track was then built, which was used by narrow gauge trains. However, both were dual gauge. All–standard gauge operations commenced on 9 February 1920, although the dual gauge was not removed until 1922. Electric traction started operation on 30 August 1922. An interlocking system was installed in 1924.

From 13 December 1965 Skarpsno Station was remotely controlled from the signal box at Oslo V, and it was no longer staffed by a train dispatcher. Ticket sales continued until they were terminated on 1 March 1968. Following the construction of the Oslo Tunnel, which opened on 1 June 1980, services to Oslo V were reduced. Skarpsno was, along with Oslo V, the only station on the old part of the Drammen Line, which was renamed the Skøyen–Filipstad Line. Oslo West Station terminated services on 28 May 1989 and so did Skarpsno on the same day. The station building was demolished in 1993.

== Facilities ==
Skarpsno Station was located 1.90-kilometre (1.18 mi) from Oslo West Station, at an elevation of 5 metres (16 ft) above mean sea level. The station had an island platform accessible from below, as it was located on a segment of elevated railway. The station building, designed by Eivind Gleditsc, was in Baroque Revival architecture. Skarpsno Station was situated south of the neighbourhood of Skarpsno, between it and Frognerkilen. Traditionally located on the Drammen Line, that line is now part of the Skøyen–Filipstad Line.

== Service ==
Skarpsno was served by Oslo Commuter Rail trains. From 1922 they operated with a half-hour headway to Oslo West Station. Until 1962 there was an electric ferry service from Skarpsno, which operated across the fjord to Oscarshall on Bygdøy.

Preceding station		Following station
Skøyen	Skøyen–Filipstad Line	Oslo V
