= Skarpsno =

Neighborhood in Oslo, Norway

Coordinates: 59°54′59″N 10°41′56″E

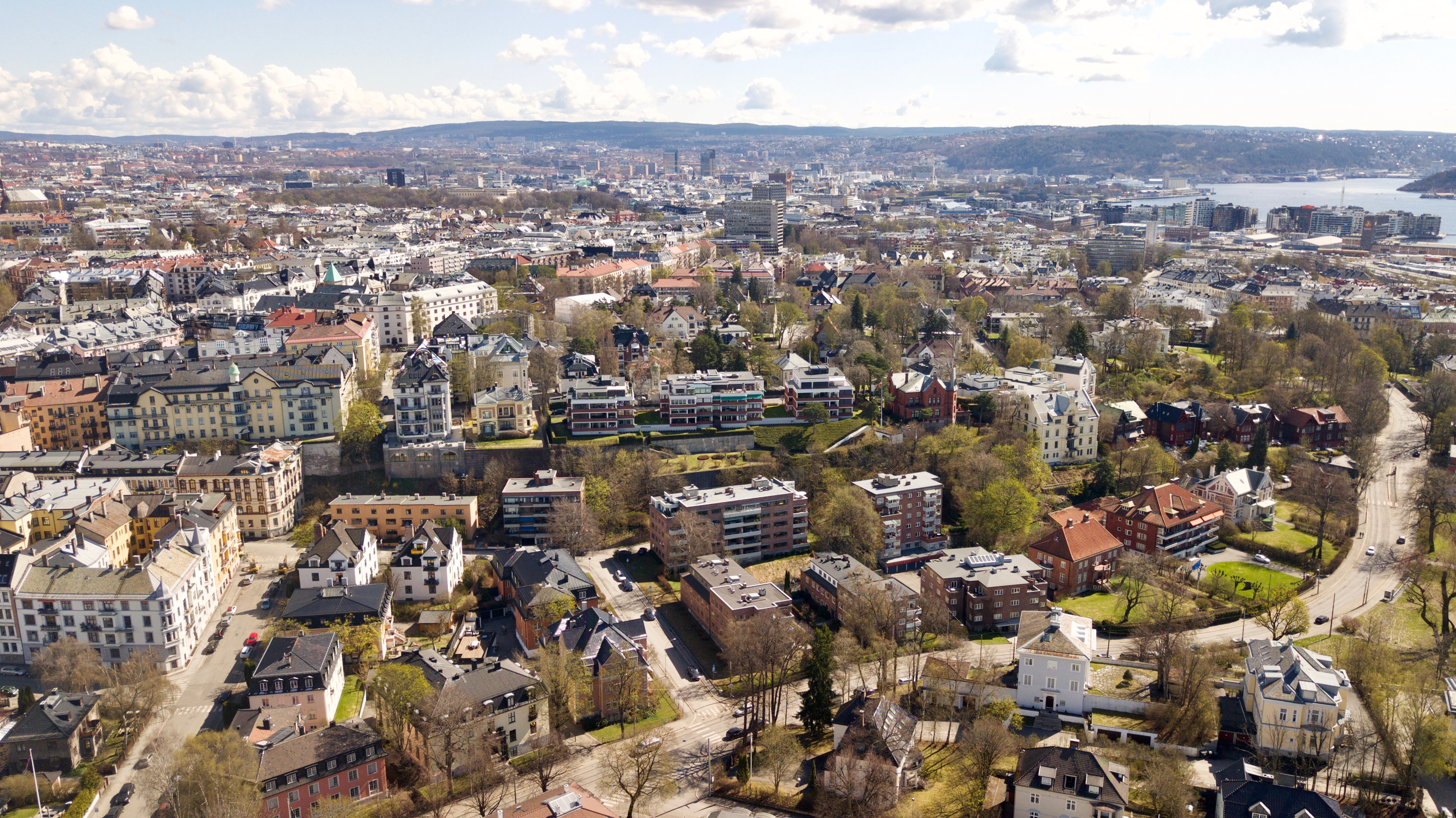
Aerial view of Skarpsno, Oslo, Norway

Skarpsno is a neighborhood in Frogner borough in Oslo, Norway. The area is located near Frognerkilen. Skarpsno was a former ferry landing site with traffic to Bygdøy, and a storage yard for timber. It is served by the tram station Skarpsno (station). The former railway station Skarpsno closed in 1973. The maritime section of the 1914 Jubilee Exhibition was located at Skarpsno.
