= Bestumkilen =

Bay in Norway

Coordinates: 59°55′0″N 10°40′1″E

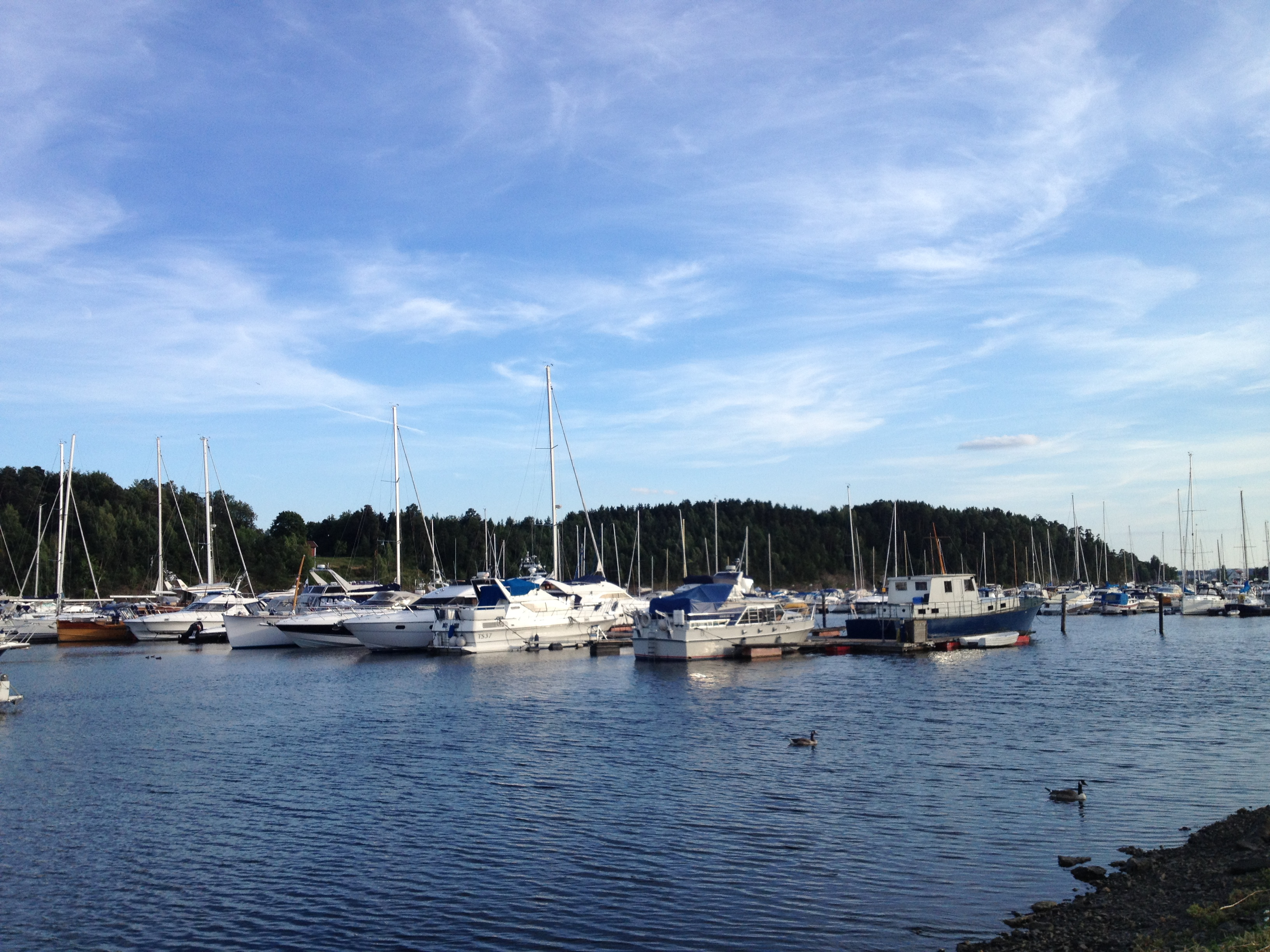
Bestumkilen with the marina. In the background: Bygdøy.

Bestumkilen is a bay in Lysakerfjorden in the inner Oslofjord area of Norway.

Located west of the Bygdøy peninsula and east of Vækerø, it is bordered by the islet Killingen in the southwest and the mouth of the river Hoffselva at Sjølyst in the northeast. It was formerly known, together with Frognerkilen, under the name Ladegaardsfjordene. This stems from older times, when Bygdøy was an island, named Ladegaardsøen. Bygdøy later became a peninsula due to post-glacial rebound, separating Bestumkilen from Frognerkilen. Propositions to reconnect Bestumkilen and Frognerkilen through a canal were made in 1928 and 1937, but not carried out.

The rowing club Bestumkilen RK and the canoeing club Oslo KK are based in Bestumkilen. There is also a harbor for leisure boats.
