= Joachim Frich =

Norwegian landscape painter (1810–1858)

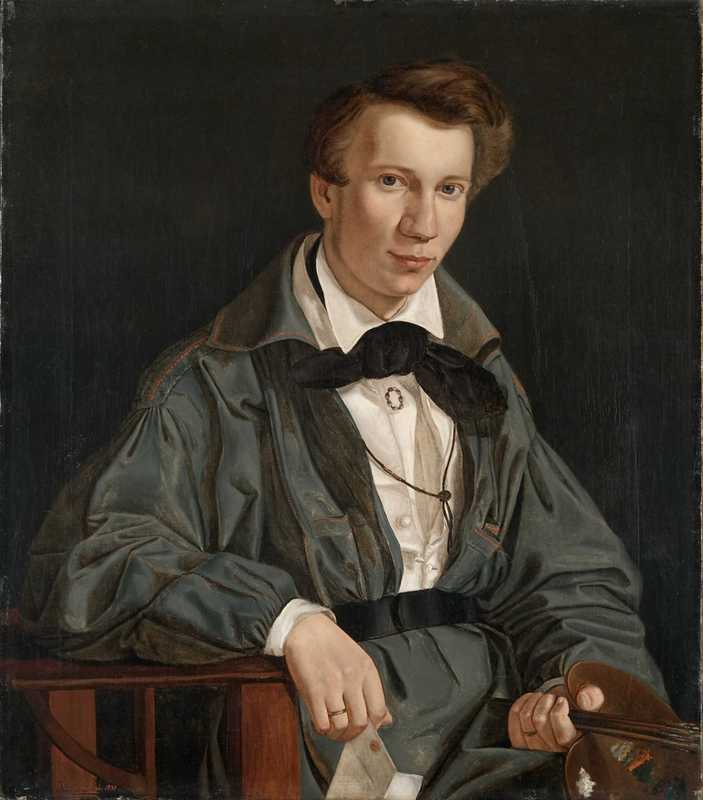
- Joachim Frich (c. 1830)
- Born: 24 July 1810; Bergen, Norway
- Died: 29 January 1858 (aged 47); Kristiania, Norway
- Occupation: Artist
- Years active: 1840–1850

Joachim Christian Geelmuyden Gyldenkrantz Frich (24 July 1810 – 29 January 1858) was a Norwegian landscape painter. He was associated with the Düsseldorf school of painting (Düsseldorf-skolen).

== Biography ==
Joachim Frich was from Bergen, Norway. He was the son of David Frich (1782–1859) and his wife Gertrude Barclay (1782–1838). He received his first training in Bergen with Lyder Sagen and Carl Peter Lehmann (1794–1876). He studied at the Art Academy in Copenhagen under Christoffer Wilhelm Eckersberg, Johan Ludwig Lund and Johan Frederik Møller from 1834 to 1836. He advanced to Gipsskolen, where he was a student from 1834 until 1835. He then went to the Dresden Art Academy of Art (Kunstakademie Düsseldorf) in 1836, where he was a pupil of Johan Christian Dahl from 1836 to 1837. From 1837 to 1839, he stayed in Munich, where he was influenced by the landscape paintings of Carl Rottmann.

He then settled in Christiania (now Oslo) and in 1841 he became a teacher of the Royal School of Drawing. He also became a member of the board of the National Gallery in Christiania. In 1844 Frich was one of the founders of the Society for the Preservation of Ancient Norwegian Monuments (Foreningen til Norske Fortidsmindesmerkers Bevaring). In 1846 and 1855 he undertook study trips to Düsseldorf, whose school of painting influenced him artistically. He also undertook annual trips, visiting Sweden, the Netherlands and Belgium.

In 1850, he completed a series of six large decorative landscape paintings for the dining room in Oscarshall palace on Bygdøy. He also completed illustrations for Norge fremstillet i tegninger, a series of books produced by Norwegian publisher and author, Christian Tønsberg.

== Gallery ==
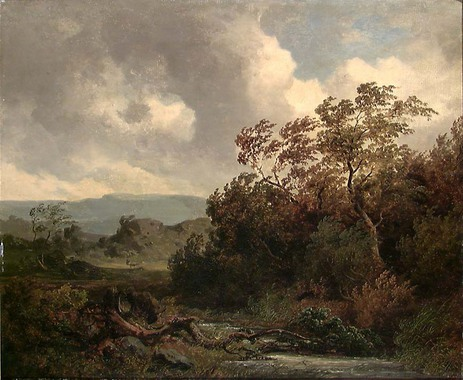
Høstlandskap (1848)

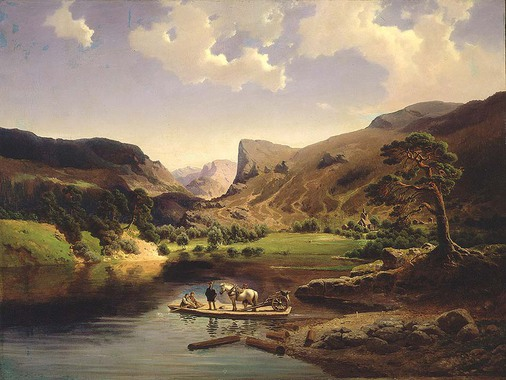
Fra Hallingdal (1849)

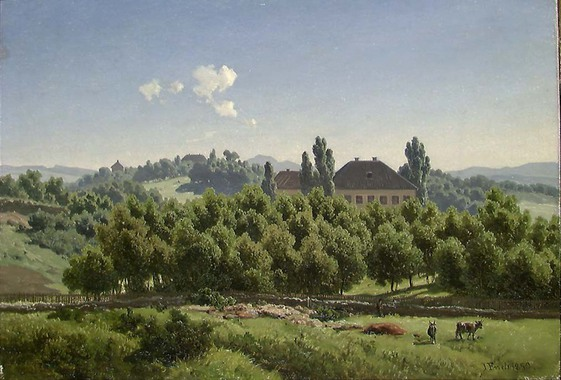
Bakkehuset Pilestredet (1850)

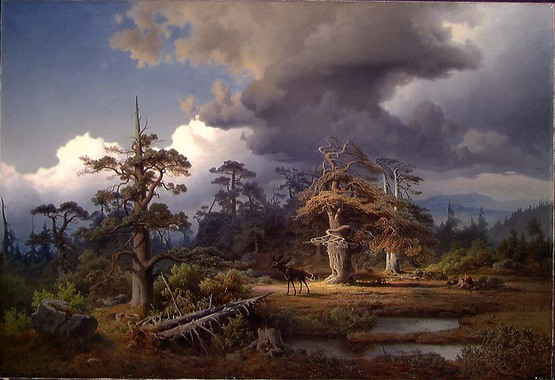
Fra øvre Telemark (1852)

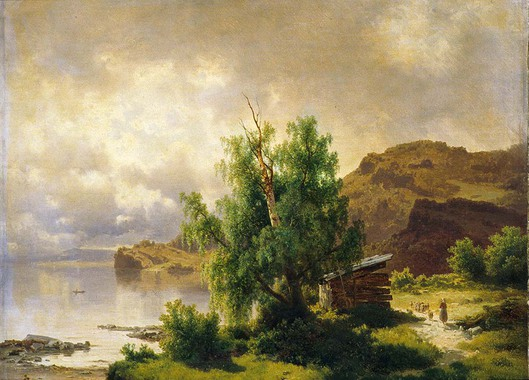
Fra Holsfjorden, Ringerike (1856)

== Other sources ==
- Noss, Aagot (1973) Joachim Frichs draktakvarellar (Det Norske Samlaget) ISBN 978-82-521-0193-5
