= Royal Norwegian Yacht Club =

Yacht club in Oslo, Norway

Coordinates: 59°54′30″N 10°41′53″E

Kongelig Norsk Seilforening
- Emblem

- Burgee

- Ensign
- Short name: KNS
- Founded: 1861
- Location: Bygdøy, Frognerkilen, Oslo, Norway
- Commodore: Nils Klippenberg
- Website: http://www.kns.no

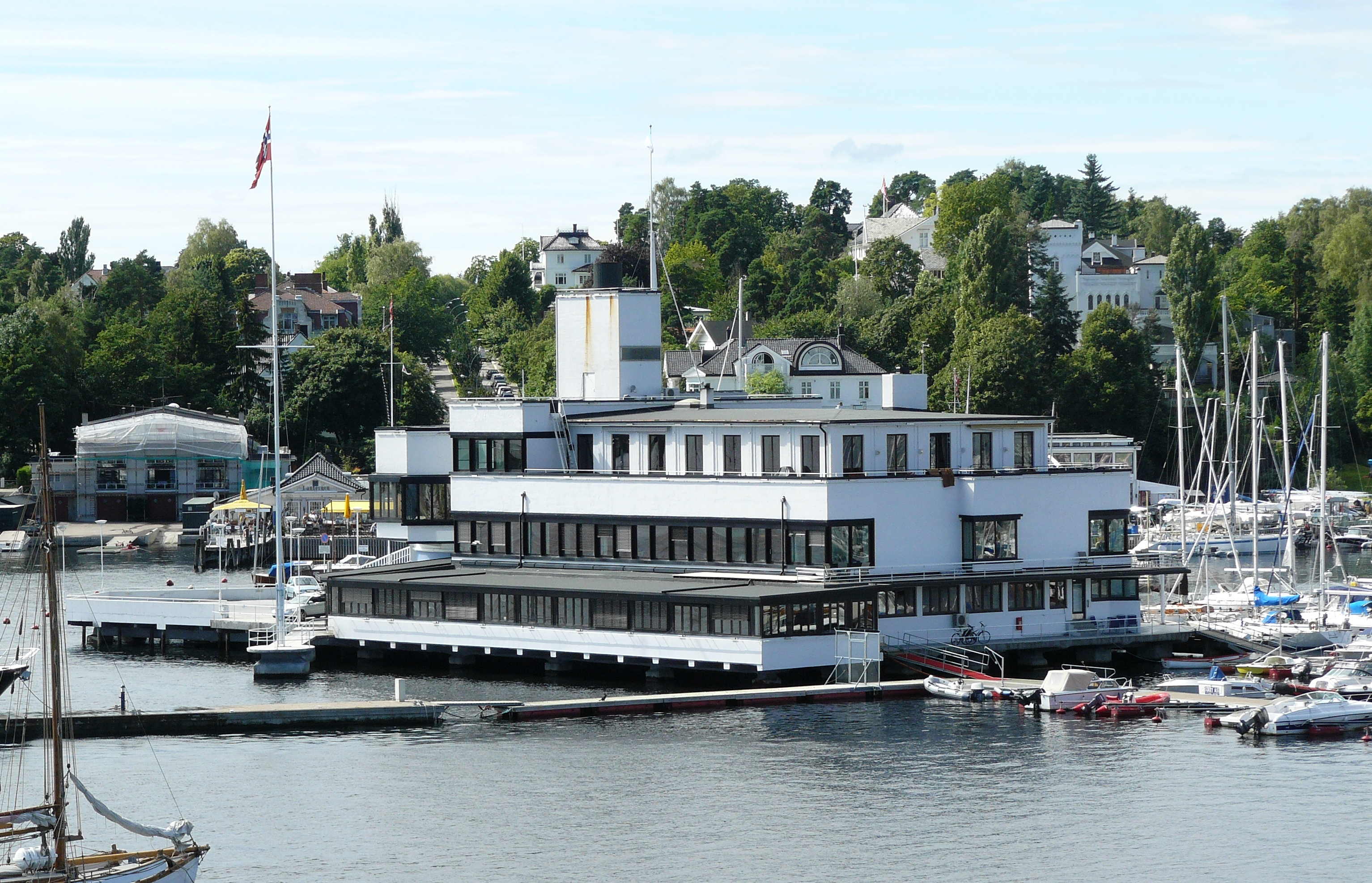
Clubhouse of Kongelig Norsk Seilforening, "Dronningen" (The Queen)

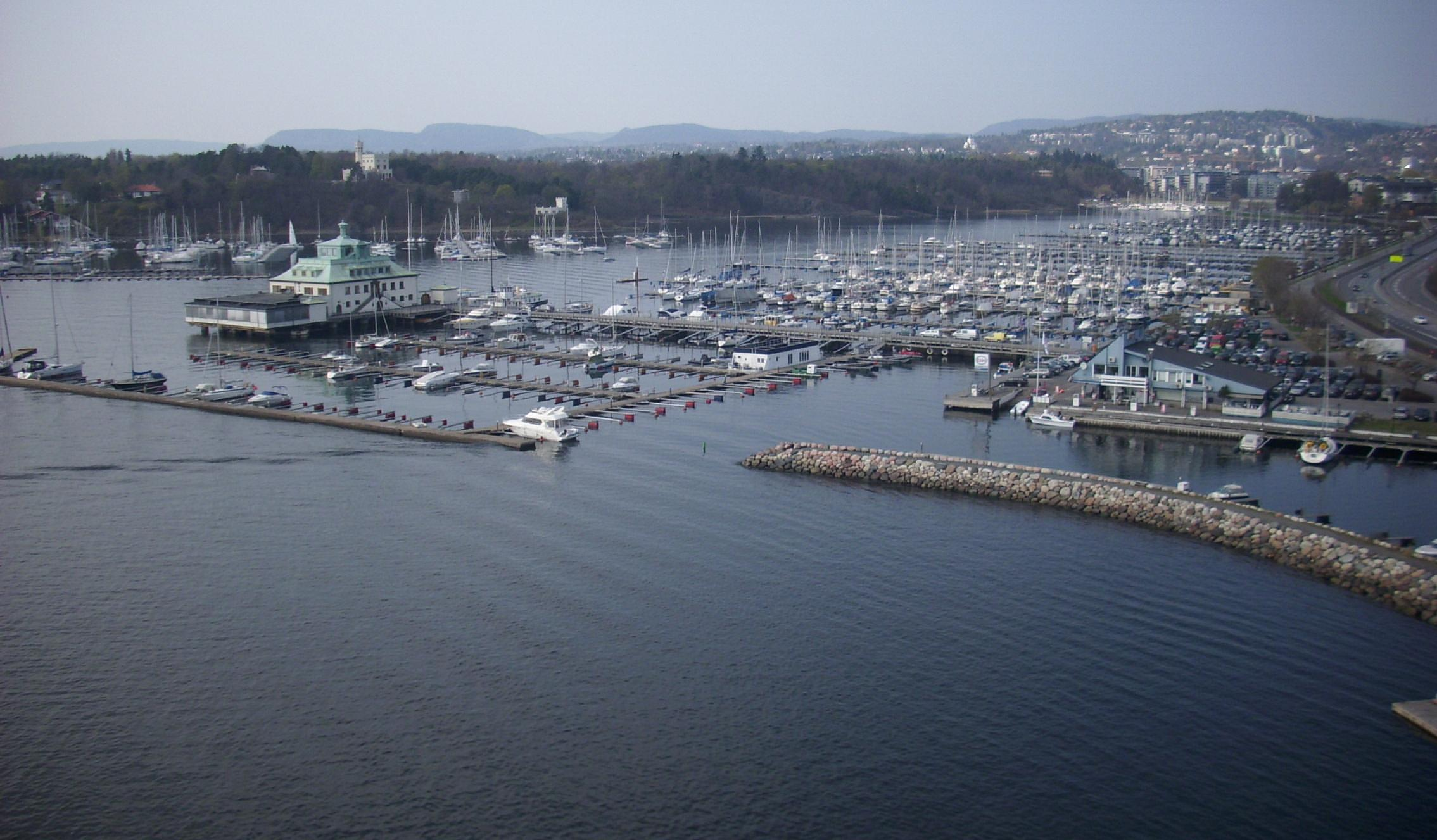
Frognerkilenbucht mit Jachthafen in Oslo

The Royal Norwegian Yacht Club (Norwegian: Kongelig Norsk Seilforening, KNS) is a yacht club in Oslo, Norway. The club was founded in 1883 as country-wide organisation with affiliated local yacht clubs. In 1884, it was granted the right for members to fly the naval Ensign of Norway with the Royal cypher on a centrally placed white field. In 1970, it was reorganized as local club for the Oslo area, under a new nationwide federation of yacht clubs (Norges Seilforbund). To date, the club has some 4,000 members.

== Clubhouse ==
The club premises are at Bygdøy in Frognerkilen, where the clubhouse is named "Dronningen" ('The Queen').

== Regatta ==
The Royal Norwegian Yacht Club traditionally arranges the big Norwegian regatta called "Færderseilasen" every year, on the second weekend in June.

== See also ==
- List of International Council of Yacht Clubs members
