= Carl Peter Lehmann =

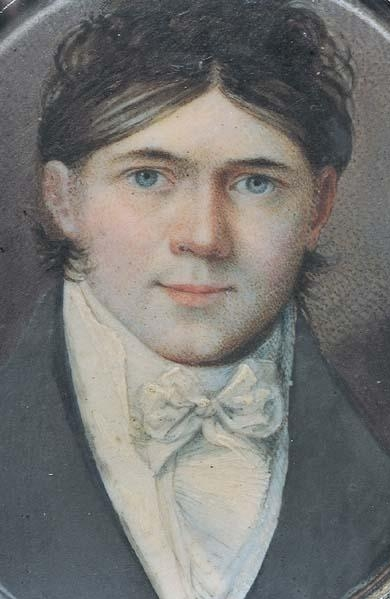
Self-portrait

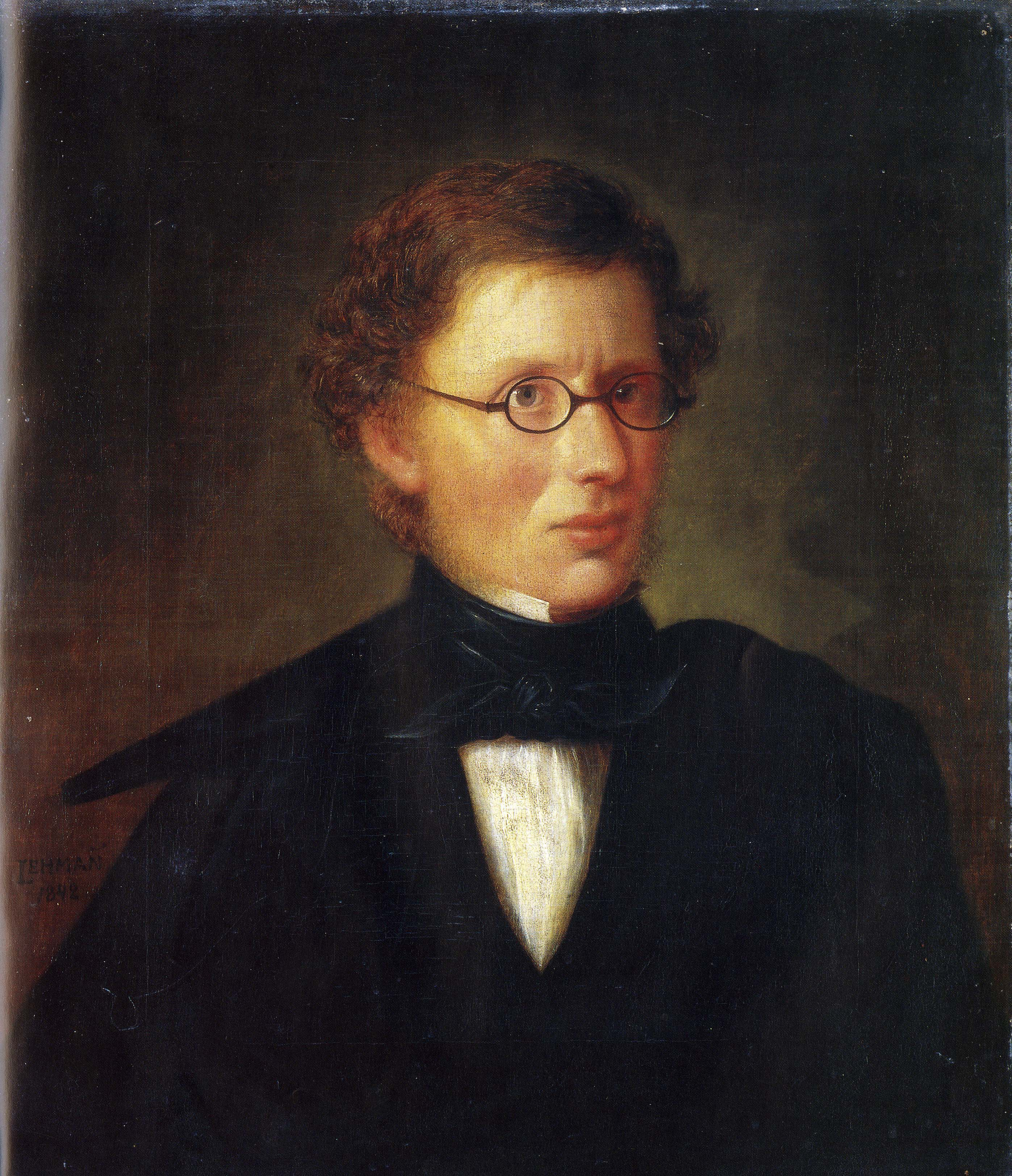
Portrait of the architect, Hans Linstow

Carl Peter Lehmann (10 October 1794, Copenhagen - 3 September 1876, Sigtuna) was a Danish-Swedish portrait painter who also worked in Norway.

== Biography ==
His father was a musician with a travelling theatrical troupe and he apparently worked as a handyman, although some sources also describe him as an acrobat. His artistic talent was discovered when he painted decorations for the troupe's performances.

In 1817, after marrying a dancer named Sophie Pershey, he left the troupe to set up his own painting school in Bergen and applied for citizenship there. This was granted in 1820 and he operated his school until 1826. His students there included Knud Baade and Joachim Frich. From 1819 to 1825, he concentrated on landscapes and historical scenes. His first exhibition in Sweden came in 1822. After Johan Georg Müller died that same year, Lehmann took over his position as a decorative painter for Det Dramatiske Selskab. Three years later, he organized his own exhibition and promoted it by advertising in the local newspapers.

In 1826, the landscape painter, Johan Christian Dahl, made his now-famous painting trip through Norway. He was apparently very critical of Lehmann's work. This prompted Lehmann to begin producing portraits instead, while planning a move to Stockholm. As it turned out, he received so many orders that he had to postpone the move. By 1827, when he finally arrived there, he may have painted as many as 600 portraits.

He continued to travel, visiting Finland and Russia. In 1842, he was back in Norway, apparently working as a daguerrotypist in Stavanger. The following year, he exhibited a daguerreotype machine in Bergen. He finally settled in Sigtuna sometime in the late 1850s. At that point, he returned to landscapes and began painting scenes from mythology. It has been estimated that he painted over 4,800 portraits altogether.

His works may be seen at the Nationalmuseum, Göteborgs konstmuseum and the Norsk Folkemuseum in Bygdøy, Oslo.
