= Embassy of Indonesia, Oslo =

Embassy of Indonesia, Oslo Kedutaan Besar Republik Indonesia di Oslo Indonesias ambassade i Oslo

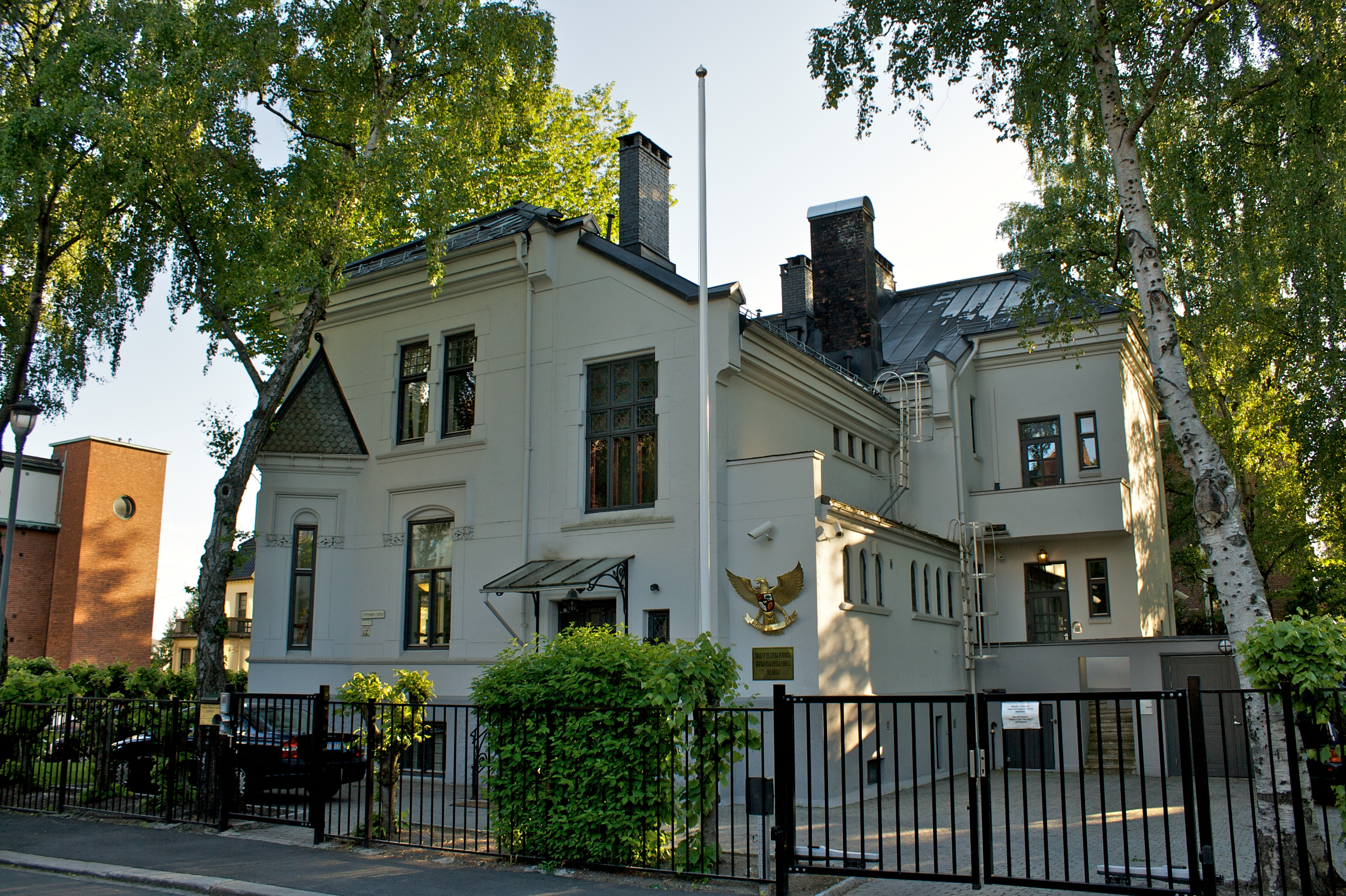
- Location: Oslo, Norway
- Address: Fritzners Gate 12, 0244 Oslo, Norway
- Coordinates: 59°54′59.36″N 10°42′17.39″E
- Ambassador: Todung Mulya Lubis
- Jurisdiction: Norway; Iceland
- Website: kemlu.go.id/oslo/en

The Embassy of Indonesia, Oslo (Indonesian: Kedutaan Besar Republik Indonesia di Oslo; Norwegian: Indonesias ambassade i Oslo) is the diplomatic mission of the Republic of Indonesia to the Kingdom of Norway. The embassy is also accredited to Iceland. Diplomatic relations between Indonesia and Norway started in 1951, while diplomatic relations and the embassy's accreditation to Iceland started in 1983.

Indonesia has had a diplomatic mission in Oslo since 1950. However, the mission was closed in September 1960. Between 1960 and 1966, the Indonesian embassy in Copenhagen, Denmark was accredited to Norway. Between 1966 and 1970, the Indonesian embassy in Stockholm, Sweden was accredited to Norway. Then between 1975 and 1981, the embassy in Copenhagen was again accredited to Norway. In 1981, the Indonesian government reopened its diplomatic mission in Oslo at the level of an embassy.

The chancery is located at Fritzners Gate 12, 0244 Oslo. It is located in an area of Oslo called Gimle Hill and is set between the American Lutheran Church and the Czech embassy. The building used by the embassy was built in 1902 and was designed by Bernhard Steckmest. Prior to this location, the embassy was located at Gange-Rolvs Gate 5, which is now the Afghanistan embassy.

The current ambassador is Todung Mulya Lubis who was appointed by President Joko Widodo on 20 February 2018.

== See also ==
- Indonesia–Norway relations
- List of diplomatic missions of Indonesia
- List of diplomatic missions of Norway
