= Huk, Norway =

Beach on Bygdøy, Norway

Coordinates: 59.896°N 10.675°E

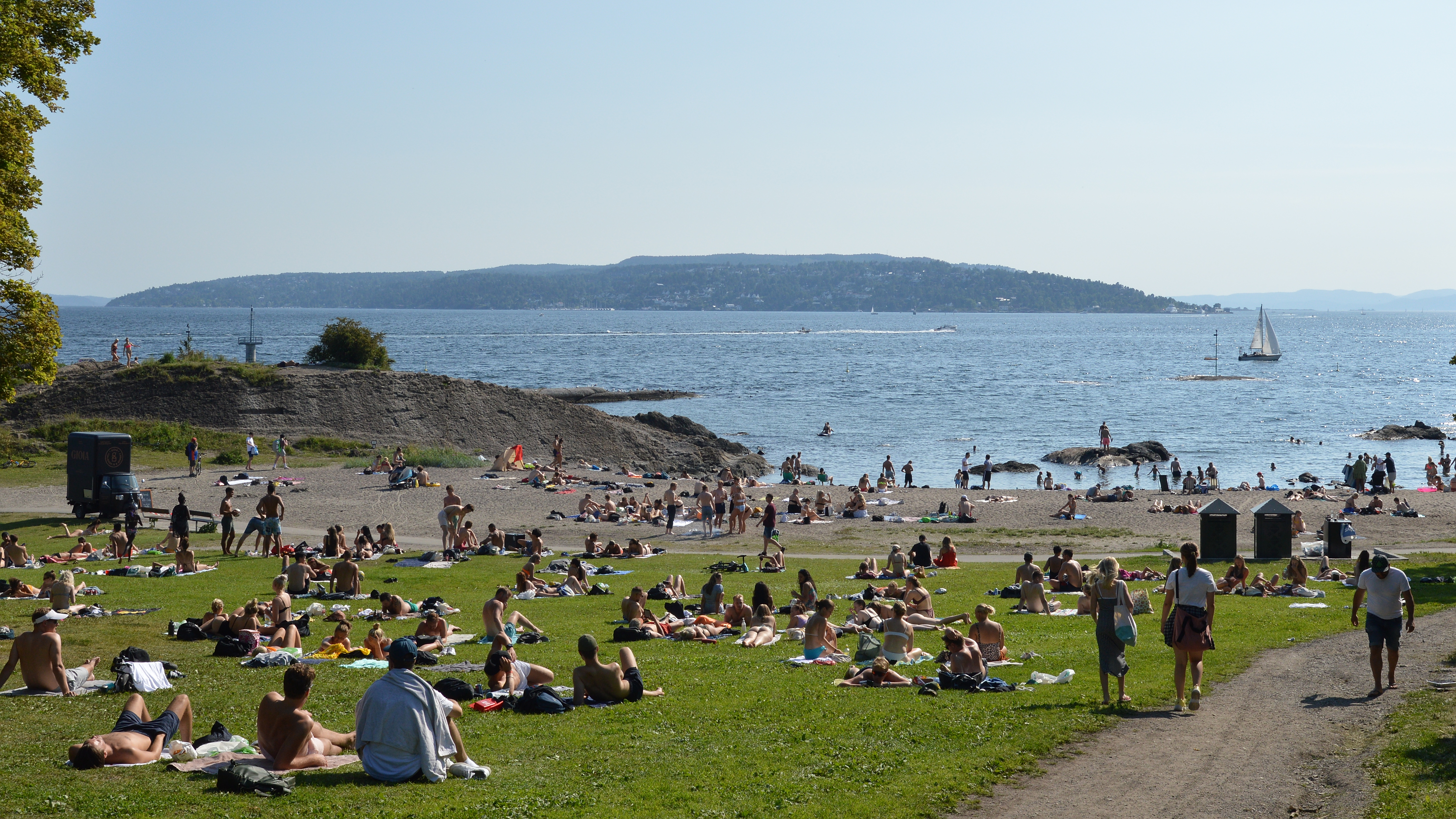
The public beach, 2020

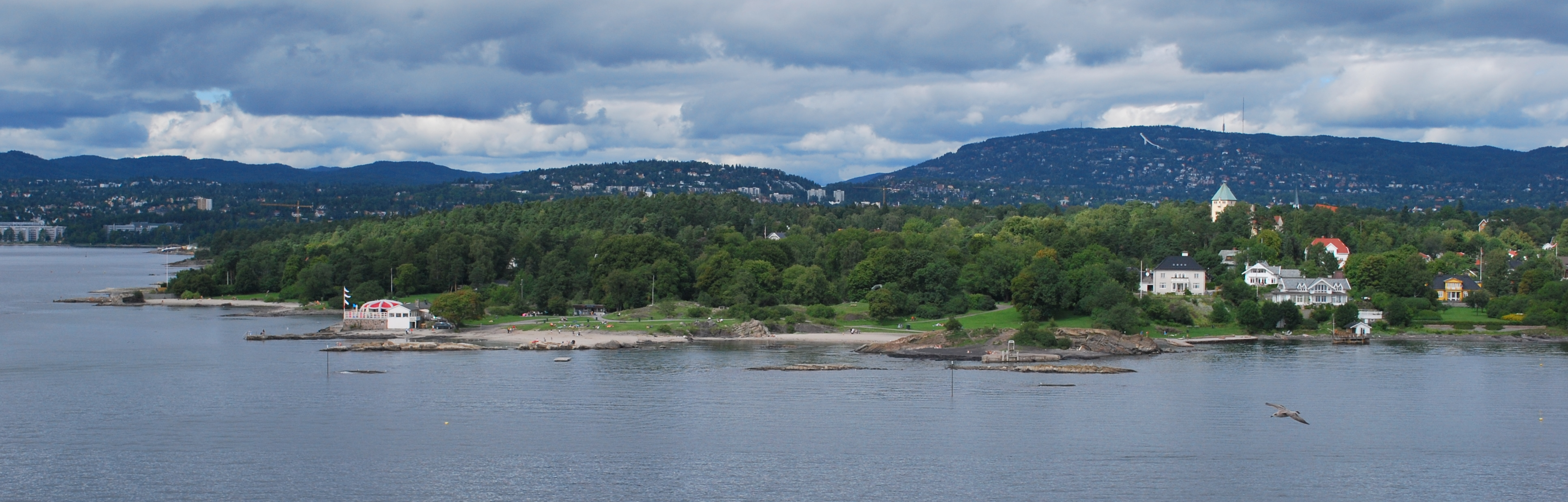
Huk as seen from the Oslofjord, 2008. Naturist beach left, the main beach and the new beach to the right

Huk is a parkland and a sandy beach (Hukodden) at the furthest south of the Bygdøy peninsula west of the city center of Oslo, Norway.

The area was acquired by Aker municipality in 1921. The bathing beach is divided into a regular public beach and a naturist beach area. The naturist beach is on a shank northwest of Hukodden, formerly the garden of the brush manufacturer Jordan.

Jens Stoltenberg's second government bought in 2005 a villa with shoreline bordering the public beach at Huk, and in 2006 opened a new public beach there. The villa was later resold but the shoreline is still open for all.

Just off the beach area are sculptures, Large Arch (1963–1969) by Henry Moore and Icarus (1965) and Døhlen by Anne Sofie Døhlen (1967).

The area is accessible by bus number 30 from central Oslo.
