= Gimle, Oslo =

Neighborhood in Oslo, Norway

Coordinates: 59°54′59″N 10°42′21″E

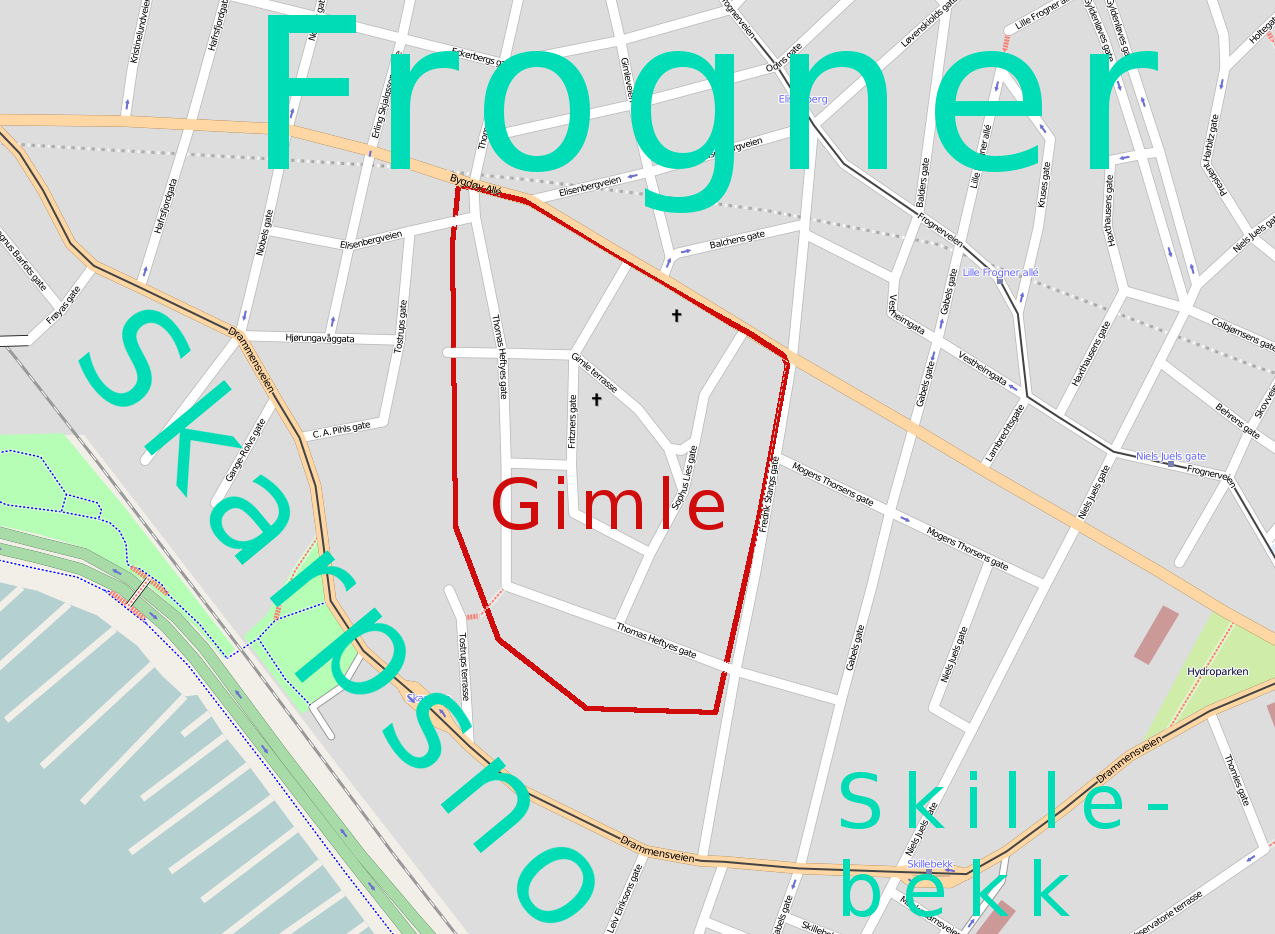
Gimle (in red) within Frogner

Gimle is an exclusive neighbourhood within the borough Frogner in Oslo, Norway. It is noted for its many embassies and as of 2014, had set a record for the most expensive property sold in Norway. The area was historically part of Frogner Manor. Most of Gimle consists of the Gimle hill, with good views of the rest of Frogner and Skarpsno. Gimle is located to the west of Frederik Stangs gate and to the south of Bygdø allé, and to the south-west of Thomas Heftyes gate.

== Embassies ==
- Embassy of Indonesia (Fritzners gate)
- Embassy of the Czech Republic (Fritzners gate)
- Embassy of Slovakia (Thomas Heftyes gate)
- Embassy of Austria (Thomas Heftyes gate)
- Embassy of the United Kingdom (Thomas Heftyes gate)
- Embassy of Finland (Thomas Heftyes gate)
- Embassy of Hungary (Sophus Lies gate)
