= Knud Baade =

Norwegian painter (1808–1879)

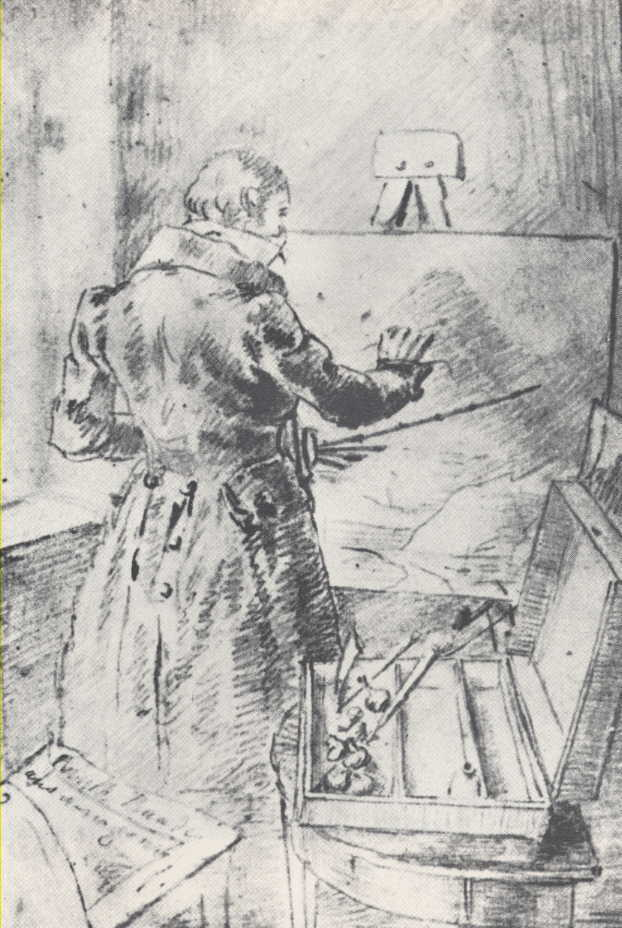
Knud Baade at his easel, drawn by Caspar David Friedrich (c. 1836–38)

Knud Baade (28 March 1808 – 24 November 1879) was a Norwegian painter, mostly of portraits and landscapes. He was particularly known for his moonlight paintings which are characterized by strong and dramatic contrasts between light and shadow.

== Biography ==
Knud Andreassen Baade was born in Skjold (a village in present-day Vindafjord Municipality in Rogaland county), Norway. He was the son of Andreas Baade (1775–1852) and Johanne Margarethe Magnus (1788–1851). While still a boy he moved to Bergen with his family.

He began his artistic education at the age of fifteen, under the Danish-Swedish painter, Carl Peter Lehmann (1794-1876). In 1827 he went to Copenhagen, where he studied at the Royal Danish Academy of Fine Arts for about three years, until financial difficulties forced him to move to Christiania (now Oslo) and take up portrait-painting. When, however, his father became a magistrate in Sogn, he followed his family to the parish of Solvorn in Luster. The mountains, fjords and rocky bays offered ample subjects for his work. He also traveled northward to Trondheim and as far north as Bodø (town) in search of material for his pictures.

In 1836 he was persuaded by the well-known landscape painter, J.C. Dahl to go to Dresden, where he studied for three years. There that he met Caspar David Friedrich and was strongly influenced by him. He returned to Norway in 1839 due to a disease in his eyes. In 1846 he moved to Munich, where he soon earned a reputation as a landscape painter, producing views of his native country and the scenes around its coasts, mostly depicted with moonlight effects. Though but an invalid, he worked at Munich continually until his death there in 1879.

Baade was painter to the Court of Sweden, and a member of the Royal Swedish Academy of Arts. He painted some fine portraits, especially in younger years, including portraits of his parents (1836). In addition to several trips to Sogn and Hardanger, Baade traveled widely in Germany. He also painted landscape scenes from Bavaria, Saxony, Tyrol and Switzerland. He is represented in the National Museum of Art, Architecture and Design with 52 paintings.

== Gallery ==
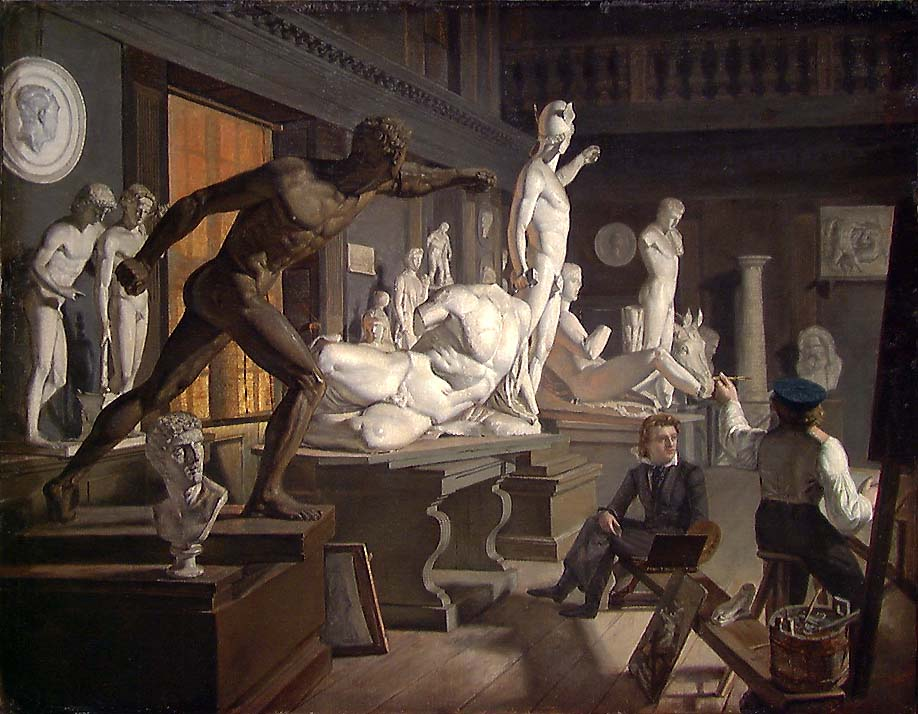
From the Kunstakademiet in Copenhagen

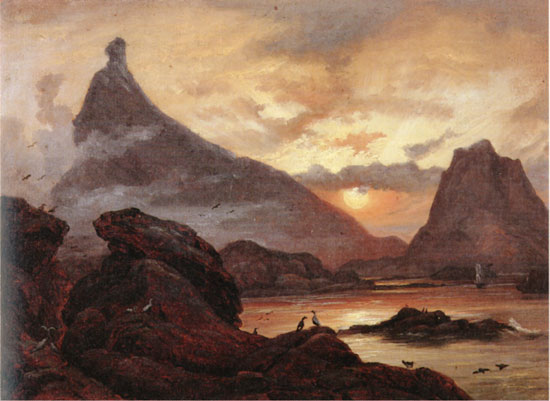
Hestmona

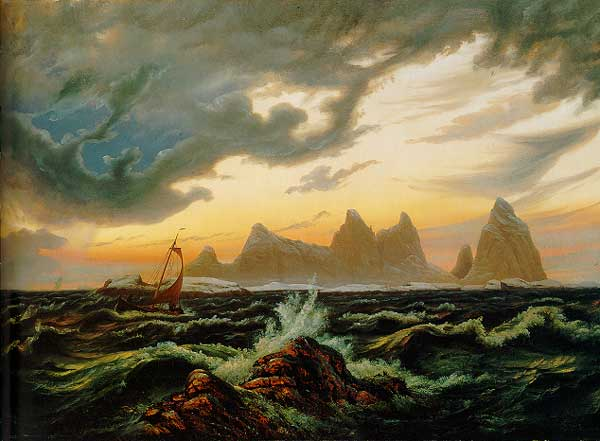
Træna Island in Nordland

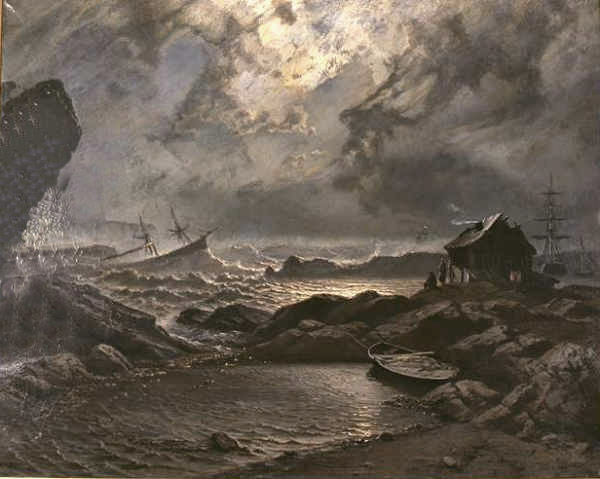
Stormy Night

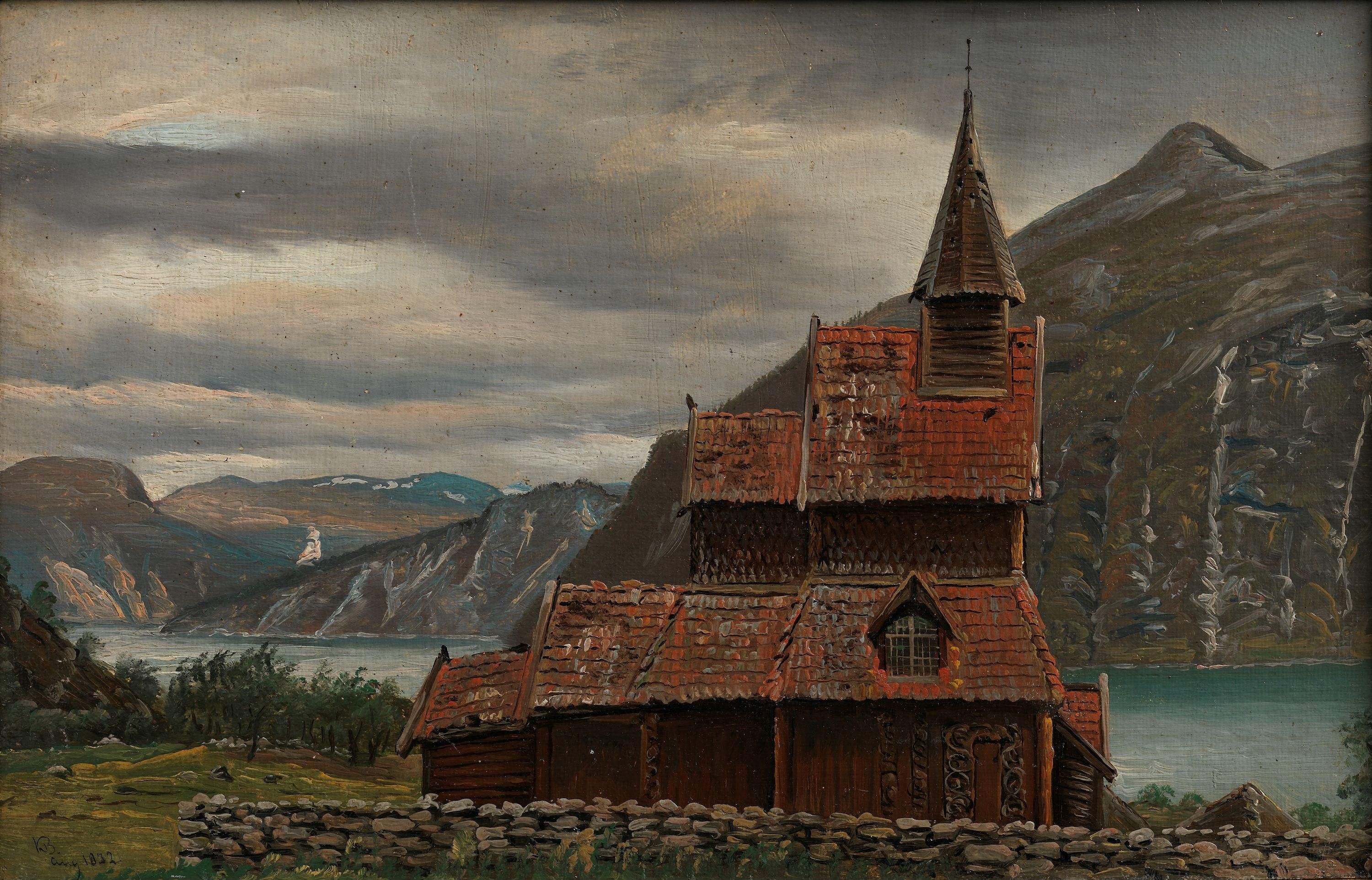
Urnes Stave Church in Song

== Selected works ==
- Oslo. National Gallery. Wood at North Kyst
- London. Victoria and Albert Museum.The Wreck
- Munich. Pinakothek. Scene from Norse Mythology
- Stockholm. Nationalmuseum. Ship by Moonlight

== Bibliography ==
- Knut Ljøgodt (2012) Moonlight Romantic: Knud Baade (1808-1879) (Oslo: Orkana Forlag) ISBN 978-82-8104-211-7
