= Christian Tønsberg =

Norwegian publisher and author

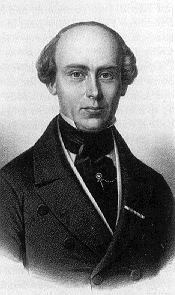
Christian Tønsberg

Nils Christian Tønsberg (7 December 1813 – 6 February 1897) was a Norwegian publisher and author. Christian Tønsberg became one of the larger Norwegian publishers and was best known for illustrated books about Norway.

== Background ==
Nils Christian Tønsberg was born in Bergen, Norway. He was the son of a ship manager Johan Christian Tønsberg (1788–1830) and Anne Marie Dahl (1788–1837). From the age of 14 he was employed at the office of town clerk and justice secretary and worked as a secretary for several municipal commissions. In September 1834 he was assistant at the Recorder of Bergen. He enrolled in law studies at the University of Christiania graduating with the cand.jur. degree in 1845.

== Career ==
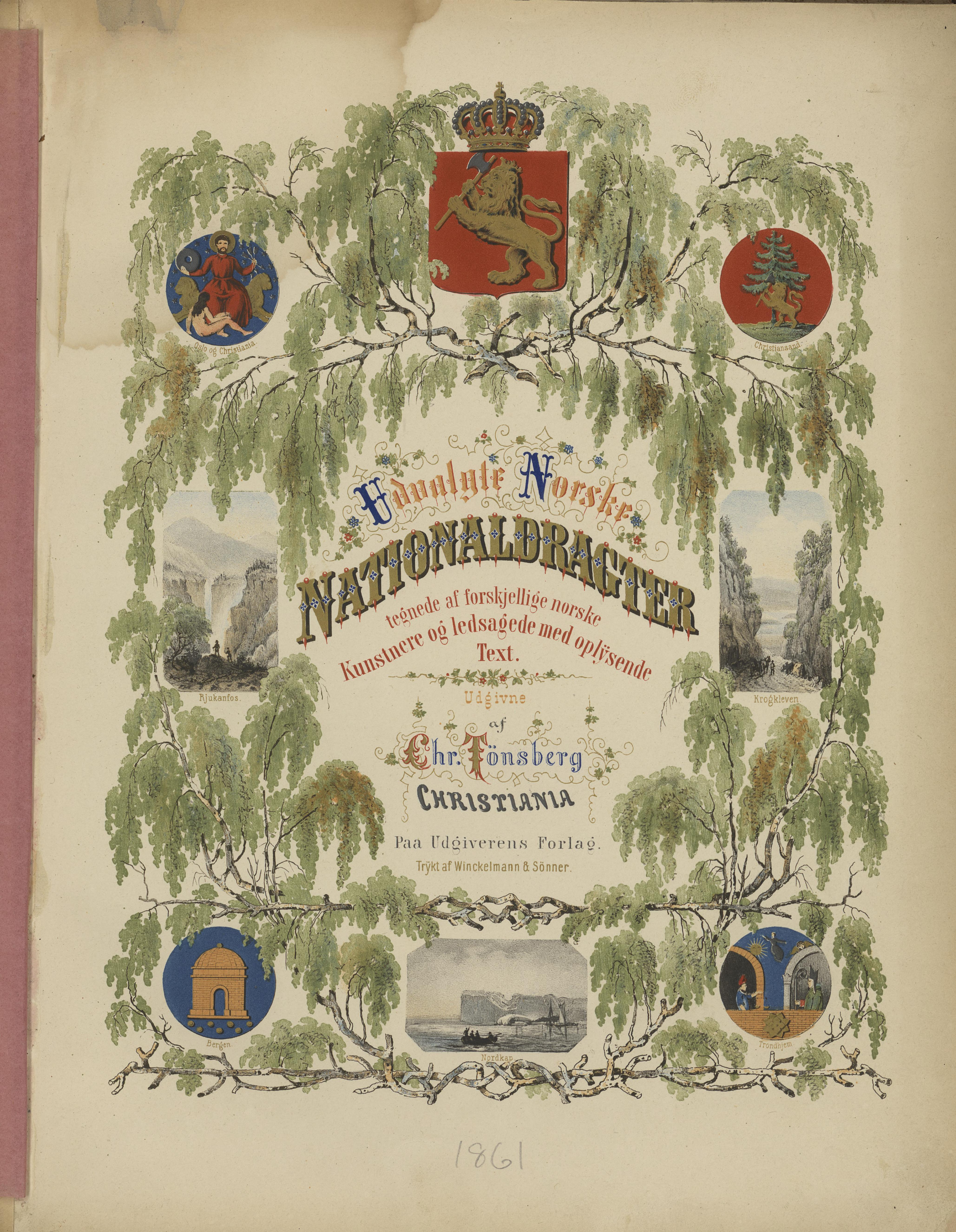
Udvalgte norske Nationaldragter

Tønsberg was employed as clerk in the Treasury Department, working in the office of several Supreme Court lawyers. Tønsberg also served as consul for several countries: Kingdom of Bavaria, Grand Duchy of Mecklenburg, Colombia, Liberia and Romania. Additionally he managed estates, auction and estate sales.

When the publishing company of Guldberg & Dzwonkowski was dissolved in 1844, Tønsberg assumed a large part of the publisher's legal literature. Tønsberg had met Henrik Wergeland in Bergen in 1832 and later became one of the writer's best friends and his main support. He arranged to published Hasselnødder in 1845. At the time of Wergeland's death the following year, he was asked to manage his estate and take care of the widow. He also published works of Andreas Munch, Mauritz Hansen, Magnus Brostrup Landstad, Rudolf Keyser, Nicolay Nicolaysen and Ludvig Daae among others. He was among the founders of the Norwegian Booksellers Association in 1851.

Tønsberg became strongly influenced by the National Romantic period and was eager to establish a co-operation between the different art forms. The illustrations were drawn by some of the most famous of Norwegian artists including Peter Christen Asbjørnsen among others. Tønsberg continued publishing similar books over the next years. He gathered and published the material in Norge fremstillet i Tegninger with Asbjørnsen in 1848. Tønsberg also published Bondeliv i Norge by Peter Andreas Munch and illustrated by Adolph Tidemand and Udvalgte Norske Nationaldragter illustrated by Johan Fredrik Eckersberg in 1861. Tønsberg continued with a limited publishing until 1891, by which time he was almost blind.

== Personal life ==
In 1835, he married Maren Dorthea Bødtker (1813-1893). He died 1897 in during Kristiania (now Oslo), Norway.

== Selected works ==
- Norge fremstillet i Tegninger (1848)
- Christiania og Omegn (1850)
- Norske Nationaldragter (1852)
- Berømte Nordmænd (1853–56)
- Norske Folkelivsbilleder (1854)
- Bondeliv i Norge (1861)
- Udvalgte norske Nationaldragter (1861)
- Norske Kunstner-Album (1873)
- Billeder af Norges Natur og Folkeliv (1875)
- Norsk Portræt-Galleri (1877)
- En Brudefærd i Hardanger (1879)

== Picture from Norge fremstillet i Tegninger ==
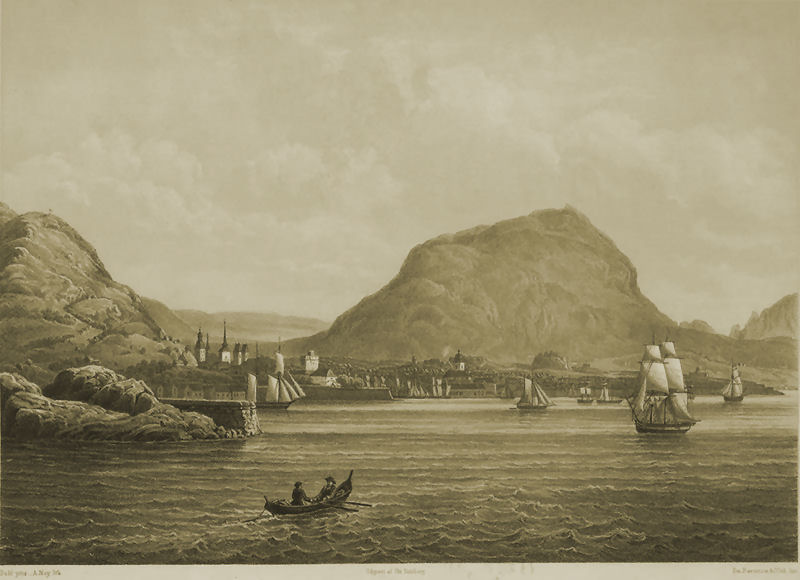
Bergen
Johan Christian Clausen Dahl

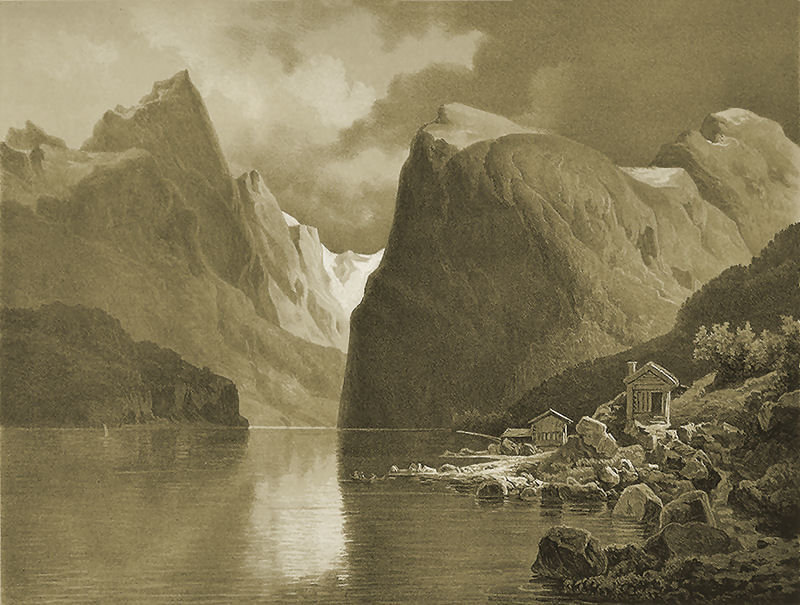
Nordangfjorden
Joachim Frich

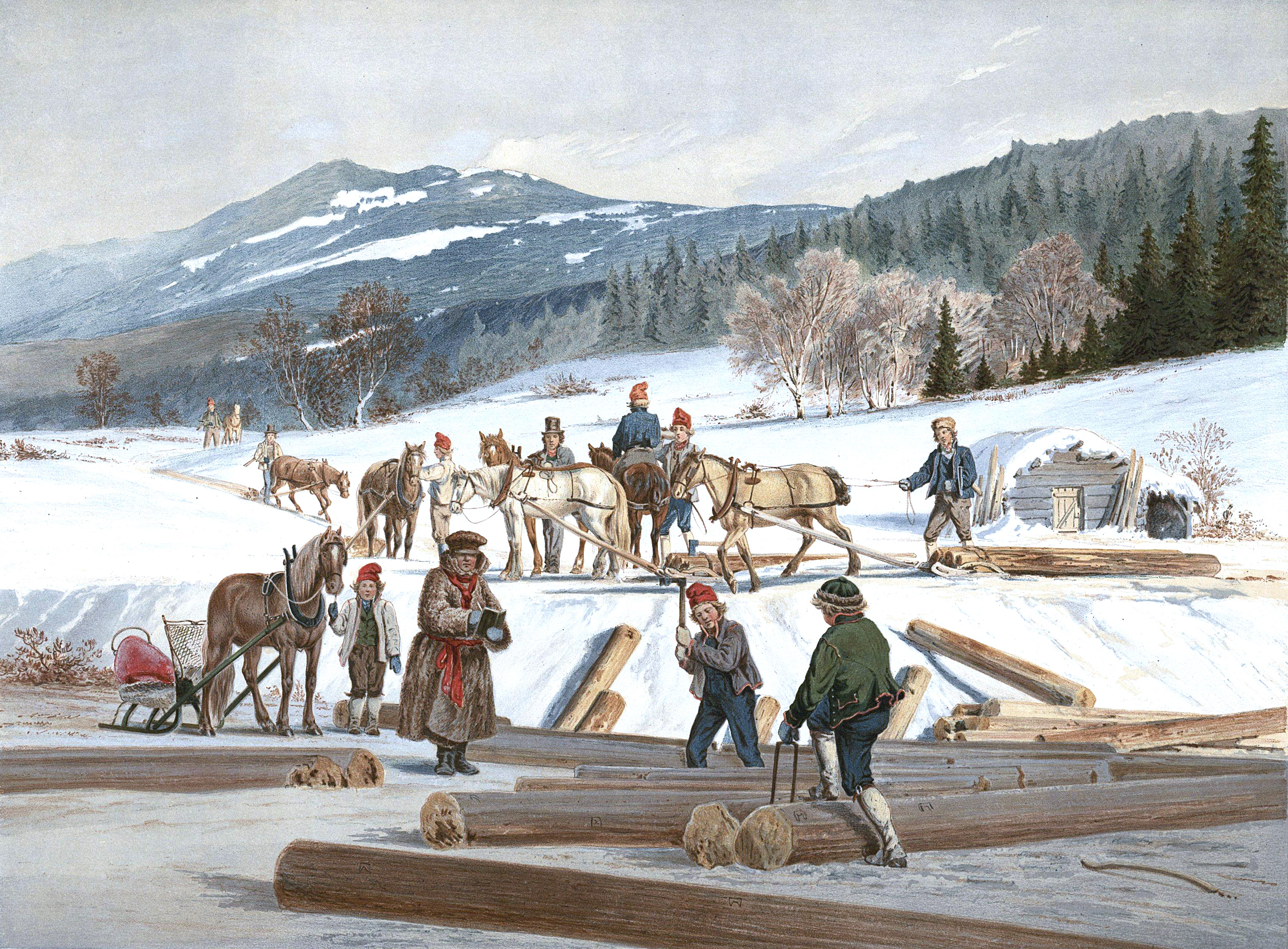
Bære og merking av polene
Johan Fredrik Eckersberg

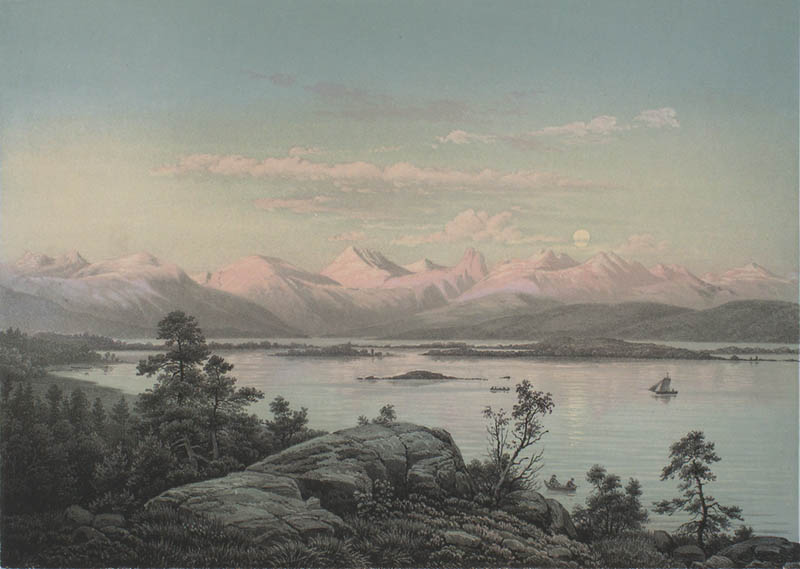
Parti af Moldefjord
Georg Saal

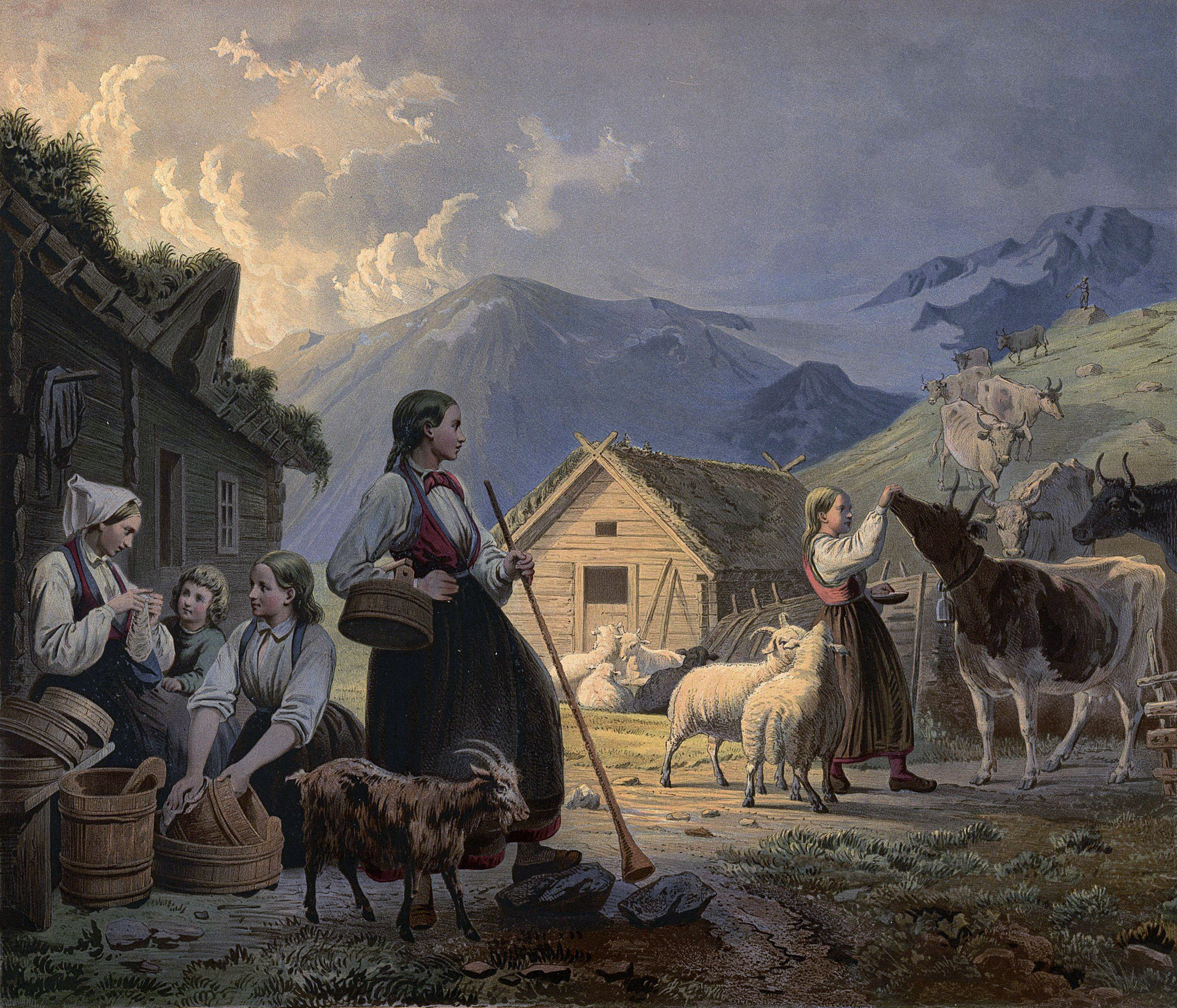
En Aften ved Sæteren
Knud Bergslien

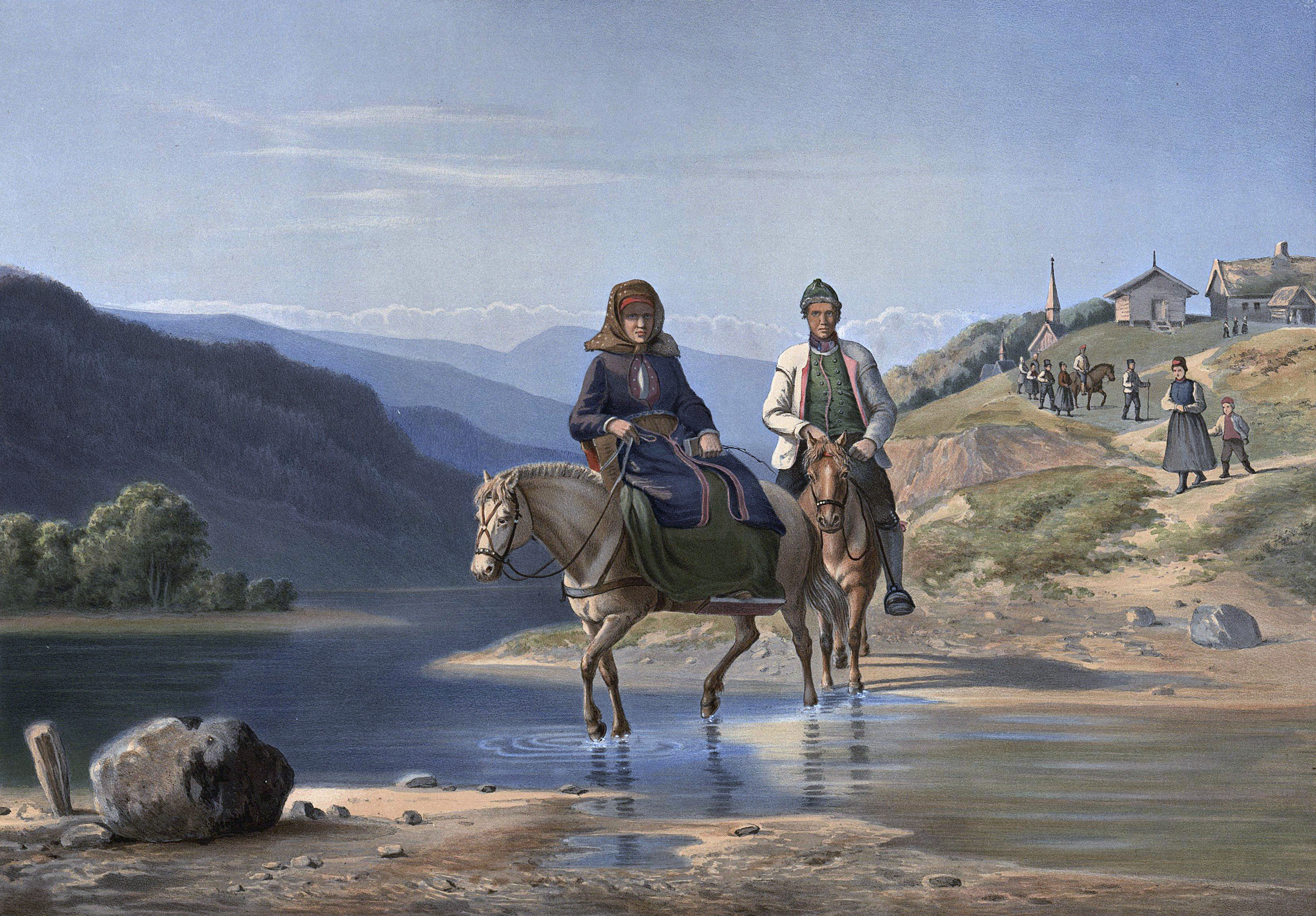
Hjemreisen fra Kirken
Adolph Tidemand
