= Oscarshall =

Palace in Oslo, Norway

Coordinates: 59°54′36.53″N 10°41′32.04″E

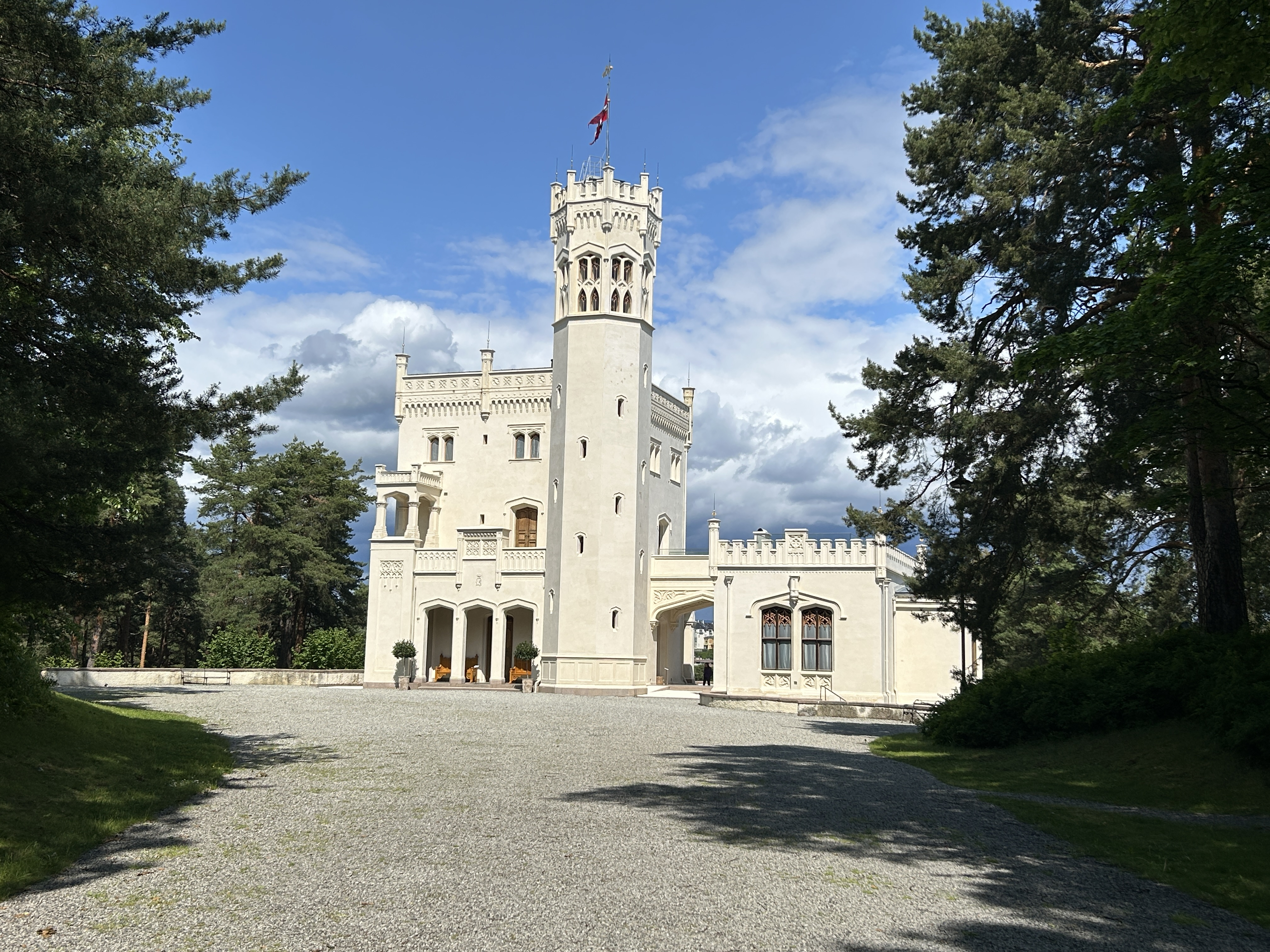
- Interactive map of the Oscarshall area

General information
- Architectural style: Gothic Revival architecture
- Location: Oslo, Norway
- Completed: 1852
- Client: King Oscar I

Technical details
- Structural system: White castle with one tall tower

Design and construction
- Architect: Johan Henrik Nebelong

Oscarshall is a maison de plaisance located in the small fjord Frognerkilen on Bygdøy in Oslo, Norway.

== History ==
The palace was built from 1847 to 1852 by the Danish architect Johan Henrik Nebelong on commission from King Oscar I and Queen Joséphine of Sweden and Norway. In 1881, King Oscar II opened the palace to the public as a museum.

The palace, with its secondary buildings and surrounding park, is considered to be one of the finest examples of neo-Gothic architecture in Norway and is one of the country's most important embodiments of the National Romantic style which was popular in Norway during the period.

The interior was wholly constructed and decorated by Norwegian artists and artisans. The walls of the dining hall are decorated with paintings by Joachim Frich, Adolph Tidemand, and Hans Gude while the decoration and furniture in the drawing room evokes the style of the old Norwegian guildhall.

Oscarshall was sold by King Carl IV to the Norwegian part of the state in 1863. The palace was almost given a new role when it was decided in 1929 that Oscarshall would become the new residence of Crown Prince Olav and Princess Märtha. These plans were never realised, however, as both financial problems and political opposition arose. The situation was later solved when Fritz Wedel Jarlsberg sold his estate, Skaugum, to the royal couple. Today, Oscarshall is the property of the state and is placed at the disposal of the Norwegian monarch.

== Open to the public ==
Between 2005 and 2009, Oscarshall underwent a total renovation and restoration, bringing colours and furniture back to its original style from 1859. The renovation completed, Oscarshall was once again open to the public.

The palace is now open for guided tours during the summer season. In 2013, Queen Sonja opened the Queen Joséphine Gallery on the grounds of Oscarshall. The gallery exhibits graphic prints and featured prints by Her Majesty herself during its first season.

== Additional images ==
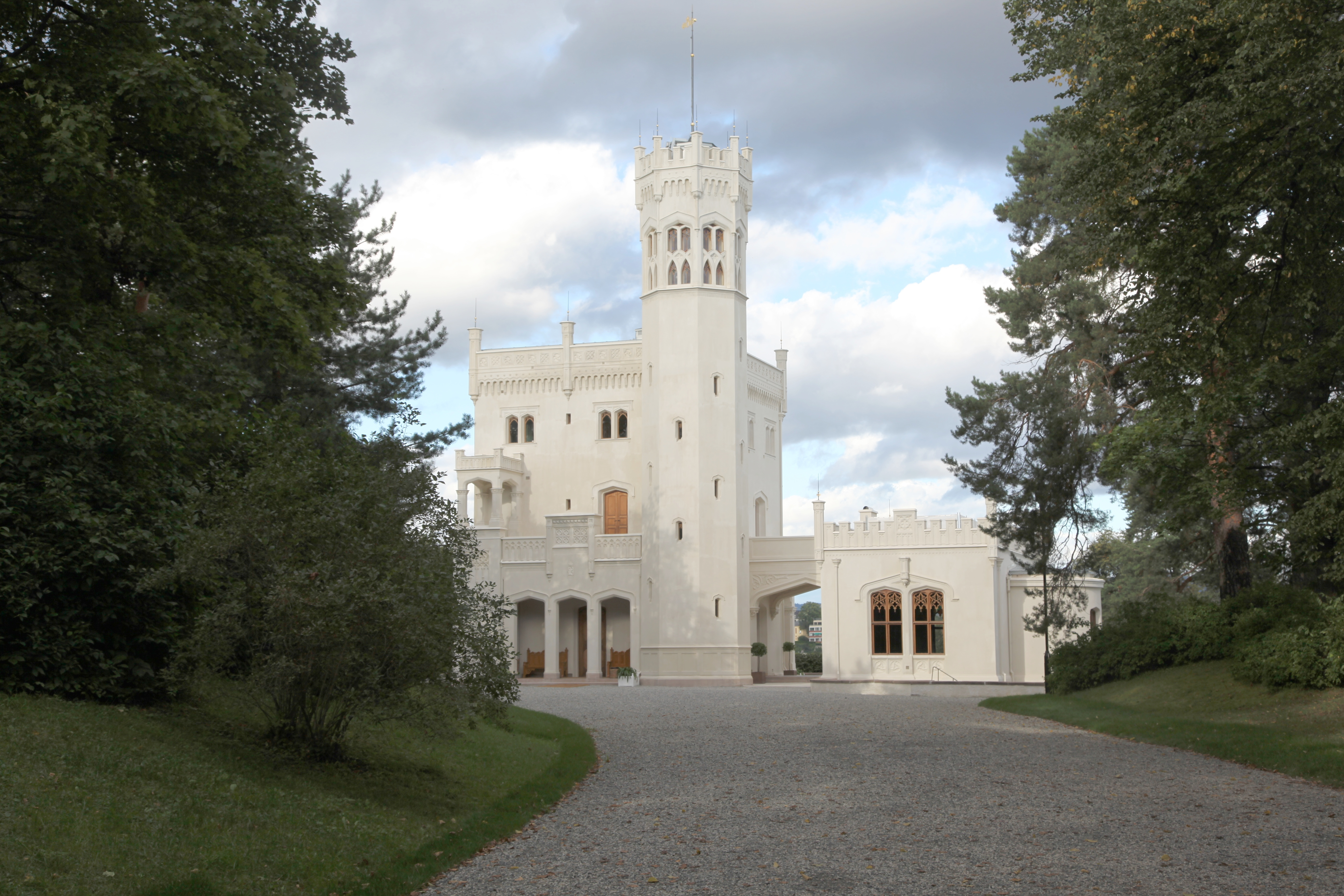
Oscarshall Castle

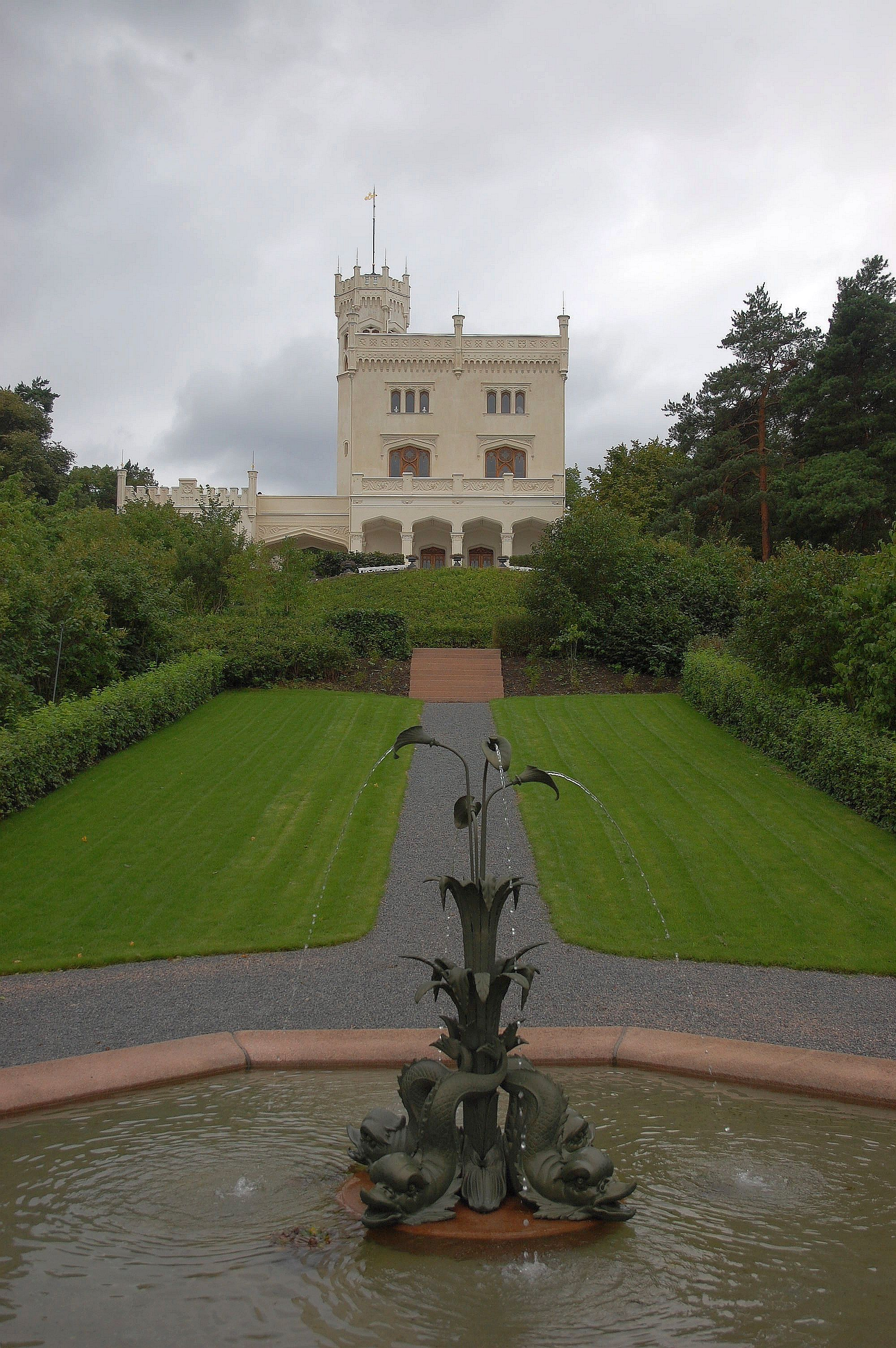
Oscarshall Castle, front with garden and fountain

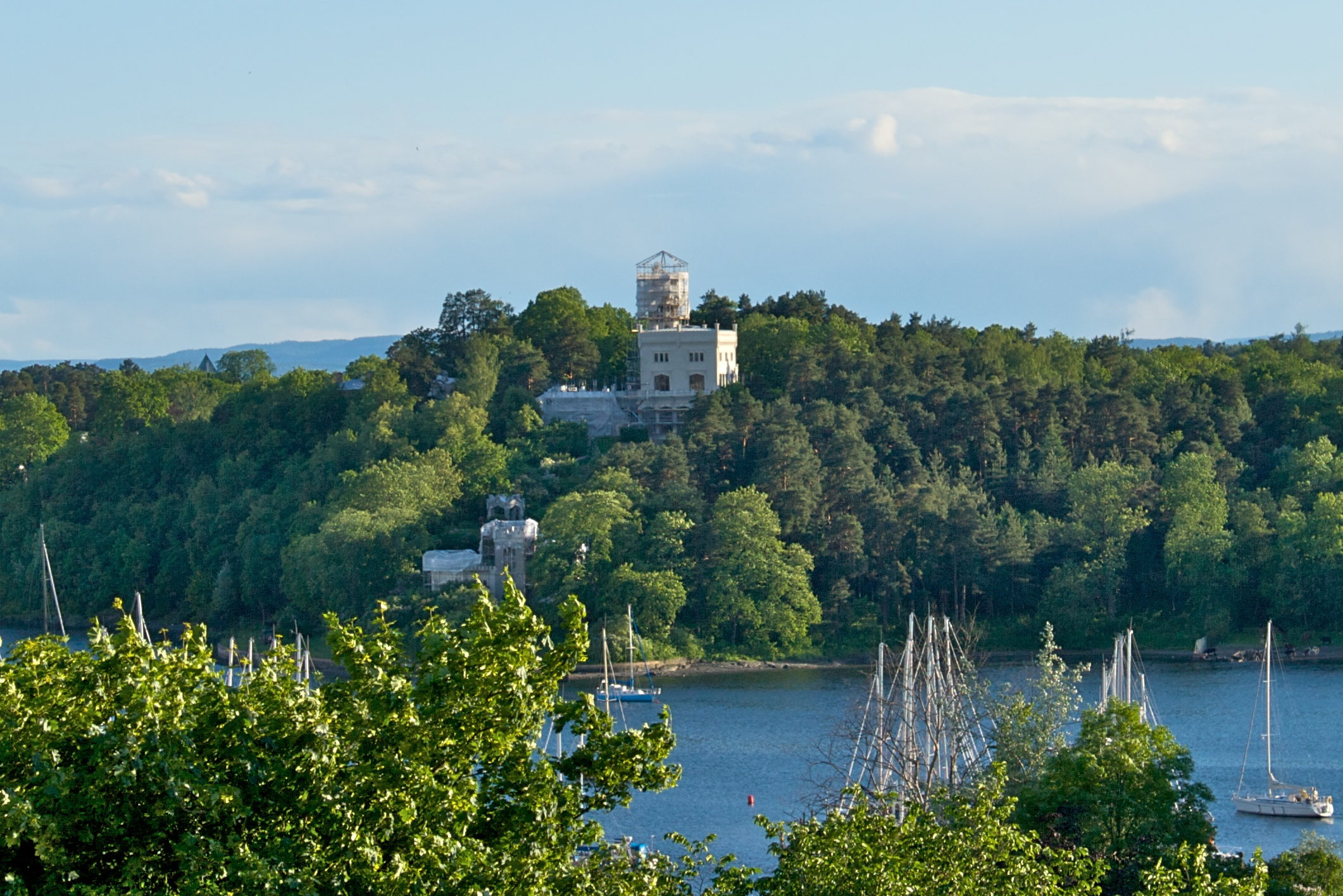
Oscarshall with surroundings seen from Gimlehøyden

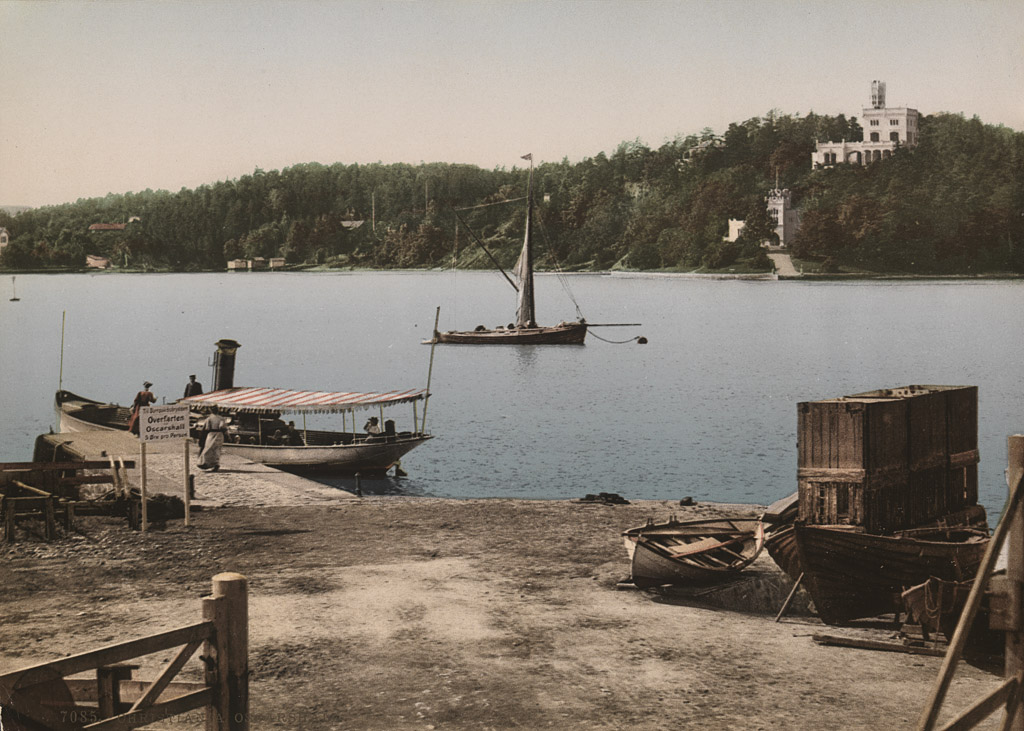
Oscarshall and Frognerkilen on photochrome from the 1890s

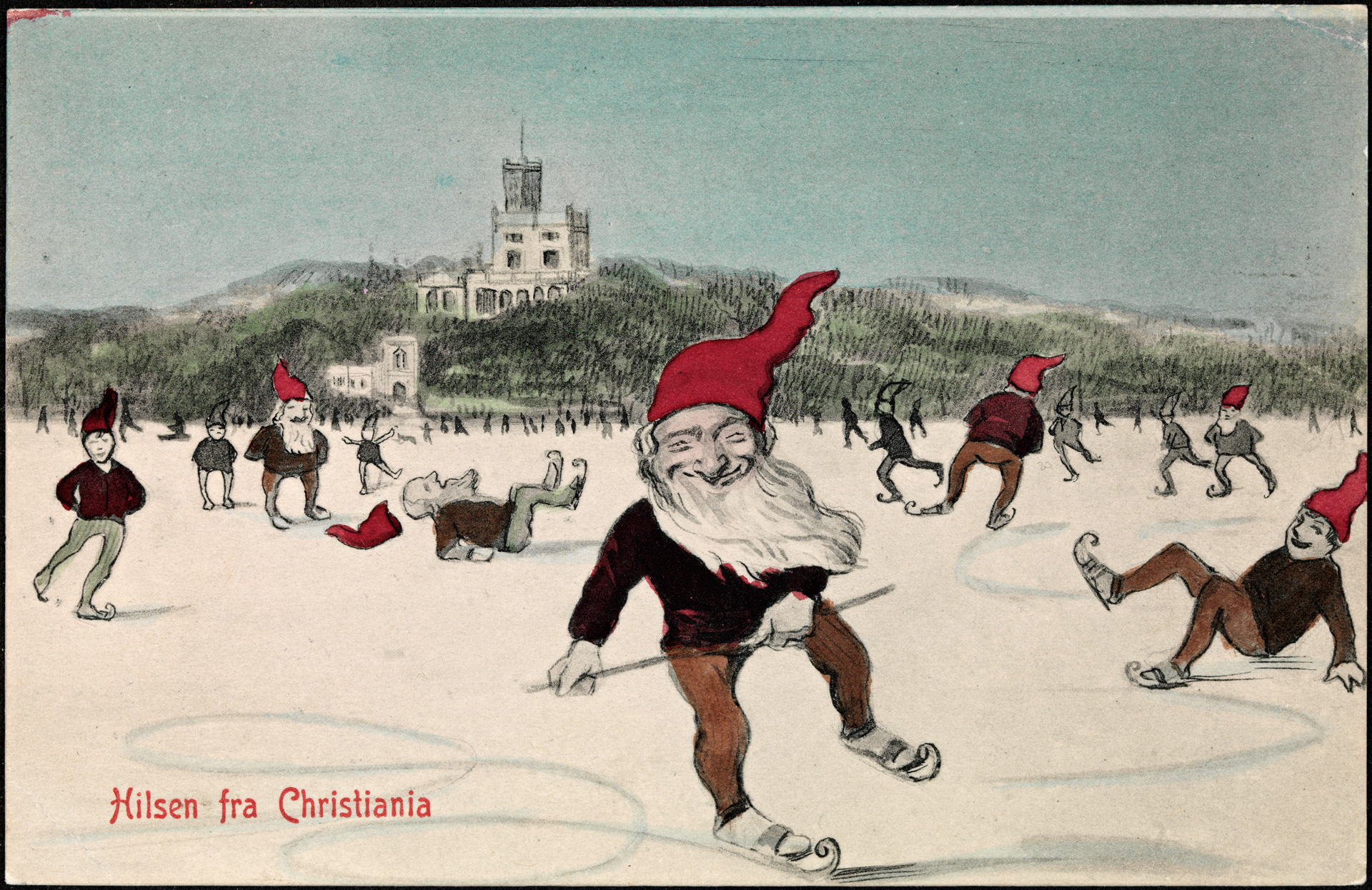
«Hilsen fra Christiania»; Skating nisser in Frognerkilen in Oslo with Oscarshall in the background.

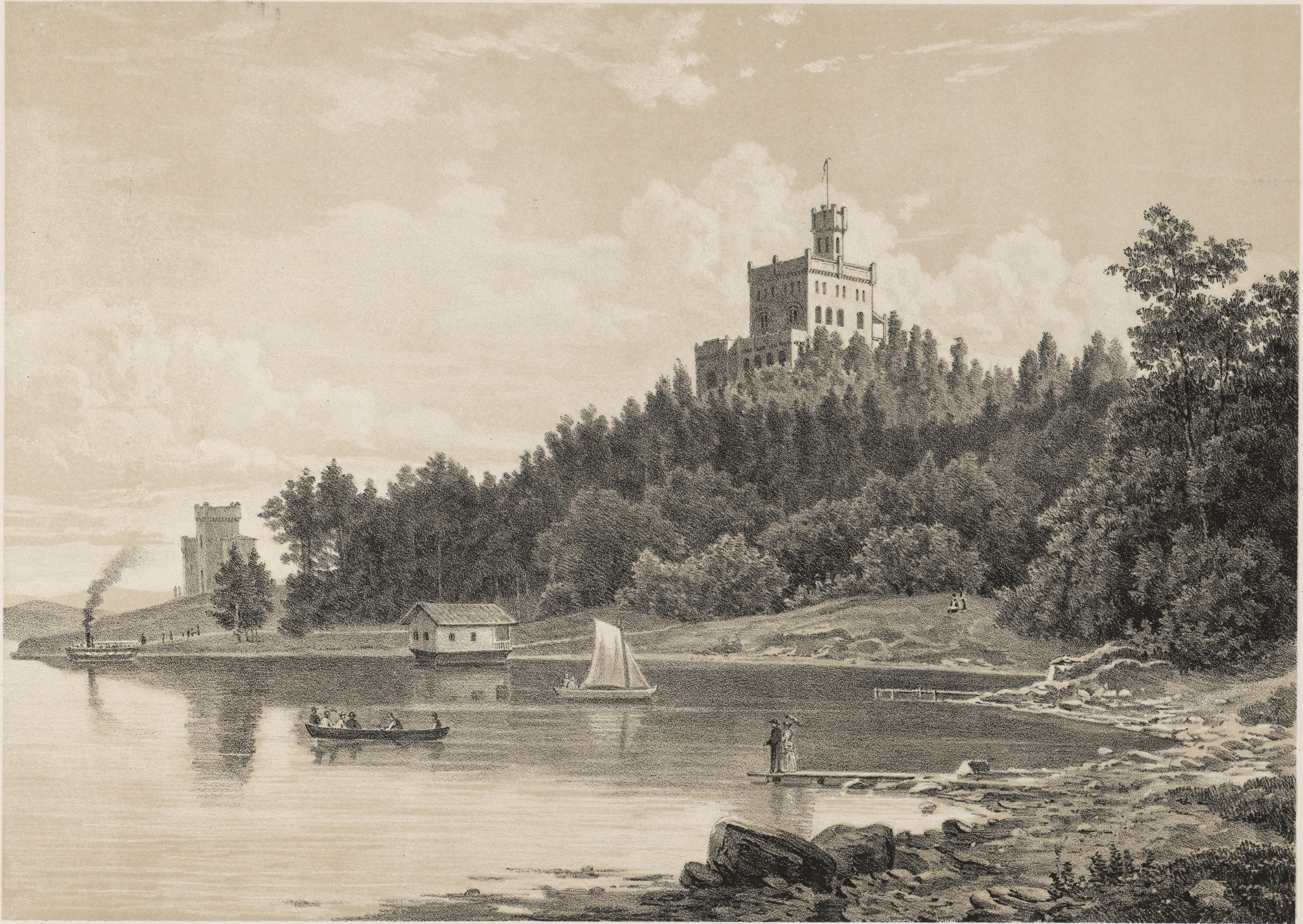
Oscarshall; from the poster work "Norge fremstillet i Tegninger" from 1899.

== Related reading ==
- Hjelde, Gunnar; Oscarshall – lystslottet på Bygdøy, Oslo 1978
- Neubert. Poul J.; «Artikkel om Lystslottet Oscarshall» i Architectura (DK) 2006, (utgis av "Selskabet for Arkitekturhistorie")
- Nina Høye: Oscarshall. Oslo, Cappelen Damm, 2009 ISBN 9788202303822
- Trond Norén Isaksen: Det undersköna Oscarshall – hoffliv på sommerslottet i 1855. Byminner, nr. 3–2010, side 2–11
