= Indonesia–Norway relations =

- Indonesia: Norway

Diplomatic mission
- Embassy of Indonesia, Oslo: Embassy of Norway, Jakarta

Indonesia and Norway established diplomatic relations on 25 January 1950. Since then, Indonesia and Norway has been cooperating in areas, such as climate and energy, democracy and human rights, international political issues and trade. Both nations has agreed to establish a strategic partnership against poverty and climate change, and also in promoting democracy and tolerance. Indonesia has an embassy in Oslo, while Norway has an embassy in Jakarta.

There has been an increase of people to people contact between the two nations, as well as the humanitarian response to the December 2004 Indian Ocean tsunami, which claimed the lives of 84 Norwegians. In 2013, there was a significant increase of Indonesian tourists visiting Norway, and every year there are more than a thousand Norwegian students that visit Bali to study Balinese culture.

== History ==
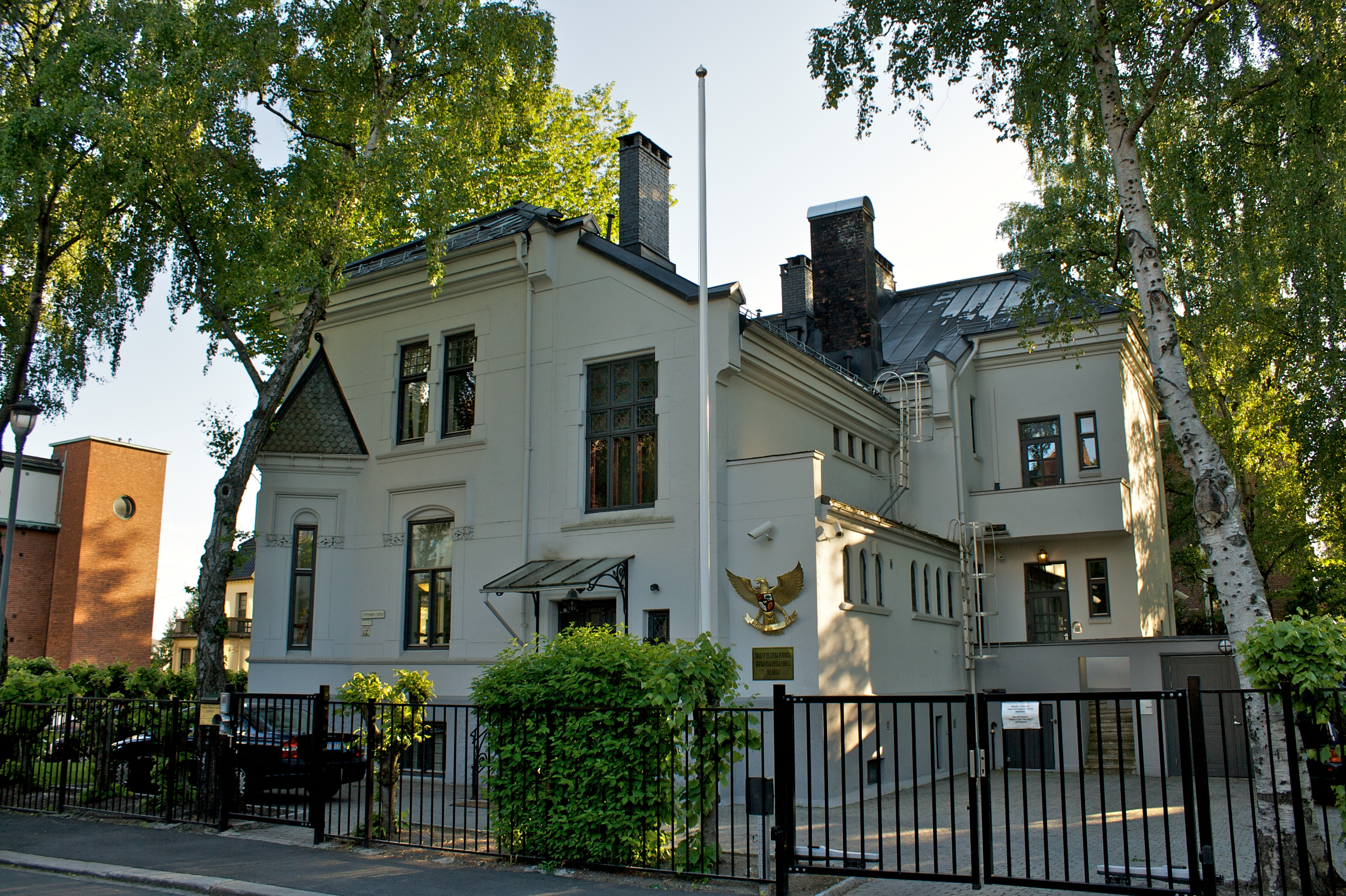
The Indonesian Embassy in Oslo

The bilateral relations between Indonesia and Norway started early, even before the formation of the Indonesian Republic. Back in 1906, a Norwegian honorary consulate general was established in Batavia (now Jakarta), Dutch East Indies. After the Indonesian National Revolution, Norway is the first country in the world to recognize Indonesia's sovereignty, followed promptly with the establishment of diplomatic relations on January 25, 1950, through accreditation from Norwegian embassy in Bangkok. Indonesia opened its mission in Oslo in 1950, but was then closed in September 1960. On April 27, 1971, a resident Embassy of Norway was formally established in Jakarta. Indonesia reciprocated by establishing their embassy in Oslo in 1982.

== Economic relations ==
The economic relations between Indonesia and Norway are particularly focussed in energy, marine and fishery sectors. The value of bilateral trade reached US$353.79 million in 2010, US$309.52 million in 2011, and US$321.88 million in 2012. Indonesian export to Norway includes clothing, footwear, furniture, communication devices, optical device and spices. While Norwegian exports to Indonesia mainly are Norwegian salmon, that in 2012, Indonesia imported 4,000 tons of them. In Indonesia, Norway has invested various sectors includes fisheries, paper, chemical, and metal industries, construction, trade and repair, transport, storage and communications, and real estate sectors. So far Norway has invested $650 million in Indonesia. As of 2014, there were about 20 Norwegian companies present and operating in Indonesia.

== Environmental cooperation ==
In 2011, President Susilo Bambang Yudhoyono issued a two-year moratorium on new forestry permits for peat and primary forests after the government of Norway promised $1 billion in conservation assistance.

== High level visits ==
President Susilo Bambang Yudhoyono visited Norway in 2006 and in May 2010. While Prime Minister Jens Stoltenberg came twice to Indonesia in 2007. In November 2012, Norwegian Crown Prince Haakon Magnus and Crown Princess Mette-Marit visited Indonesia.

== See also ==
- Foreign relations of Indonesia
- Foreign relations of Norway
