= Queen Joséphine Gallery =

Art gallery in Oslo, Norway

Coordinates: 59°54′35″N 10°41′33″E

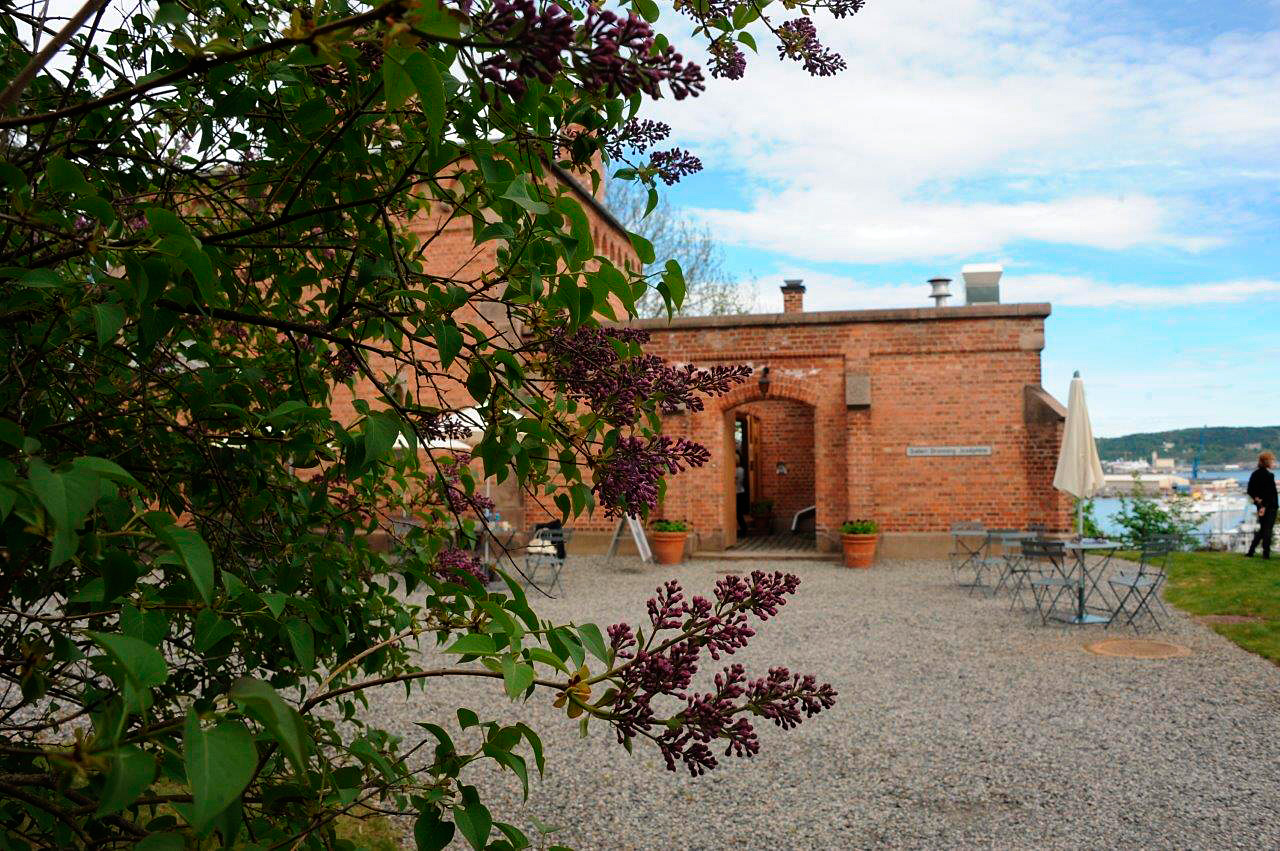
The gallery is situated in the grounds of Oscarshall, Oslo.

The Queen Joséphine Gallery (Galleri Dronning Joséphine) is situated on the grounds of Oscarshall at Bygdøy in Oslo, Norway.

Queen Joséphine Gallery was named in honor of Queen Josephine, wife of King Oscar I of Sweden. Oscarshall summer palace was completed in 1852 and named after King Oscar I. The Swedish Royal Family art collection at Oscarhall constitutes the basis for the fine art collection contained at the gallery. Queen Joséphine Gallery was officially opened by Queen Sonja on 13 June 2013. Its main focus is on graphic prints / paper based art.

== Exhibitions ==
- 2013: During the first season, the gallery featured prints made by Queen Sonja, Kjell Nupen, Ørnulf Opdahl and Tiina Kivinen.
- 2014: The second season exhibition shows 65 new works by Olav Christopher Jenssen.
