= Færderseilasen =

Regatta held on second weekend in June

Færderseilasen, also called Færder'n, is a regatta that is held on the second weekend in June by the Royal Norwegian Yacht Club.

The regatta starts in Oslo for ordinary sailboats and in Son for old yachts. The fastest of the sailboats sail around Færder Lighthouse. The endpoint is in Tønsberg since 2017, after many years finishing at Horten. Smaller boats turn around at Hollenderbåen or Medfjordbåen. The regatta is open for any member of a Yacht Club, and boats are placed in classes according to their sailing potential. The trip from Oslo to Færder to Horten is about 83 nautical miles long.
