= Frognerkilen =

Bay in the inner Oslofjord of Norway

Coordinates: 59°54′43.77″N 10°41′42.22″E

Frognerkilen is a bay in the inner Oslofjord of Norway, east of the Bygdøy peninsula.

Its name stems from the neighbourhood Frogner, a name which was taken from a farm. It was formerly known, with Bestumkilen, under the name of Ladegaardsfjordene. This stems from older times, when Bygdøy was an island, named Ladegaardsøen. Bygdøy later became a peninsula due to post-glacial rebound, separating Bestumkilen from Frognerkilen. Propositions to reconnect Bestumkilen and Frognerkilen through a canal were made in 1928 and 1937, but not carried out. It was an important shipping port for timber in the 17th and 18th centuries, but today a large part of the bay is used as a harbour for leisure boats.

During the winter, Frognerkilen was used as a venue for harness racing—from 1875 to the 1920s—as well as speed skating in the pioneer days before 1900. A skating competition between Axel Paulsen and Renke van der Zee from the Netherlands on Frognerkilen in 1885, when van der Zee challenged Paulsen for his title "amateur champion of the world", attracted approximately 30,000 spectators. Kristiania Skøiteklub had Frognerkilen as its competition arena until Frogner stadion was opened in 1901.

Frognerkilen was also a popular site of boat sports. The rowing club Christiania RK had its headquarters at the mainland, in a locality known as "Kongen" ('The King'), whereas the Royal Norwegian Yacht Club had its headquarters at the opposite shore of Frognerkilen, in a locality known as "Dronningen" ('The Queen'). Frognerkilen was formerly trafficked by ferry; one ferry sailed between the railway station at Skarpsno and Oscarshall at Bygdøy, and the other sailed between Skillebekk and Kongen. Also, Frognerkilen was probably the site where Fiskerlivets farer, depicting perils at sea, was filmed. Released in 1908, it is considered to be the Norwegian drama film.

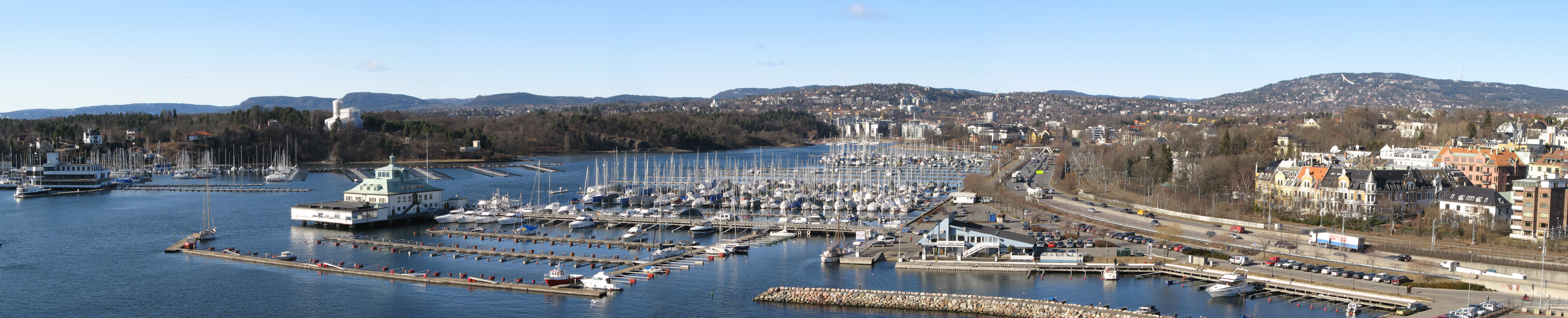
Frognerstranda seen from Filipstad. Dronningen is the building seen in the extreme left, Kongen is slightly to the right. The forested area to the left, near the waterside, is Bygdøy. The European route E18 runs along the shore. Also, Holmenkollen ski jump is barely visible, in the background near the upper-right corner.
