= Bygdøy =

Fashionable residential areas in Norway

Coordinates: 59°54′25″N 10°40′49″E

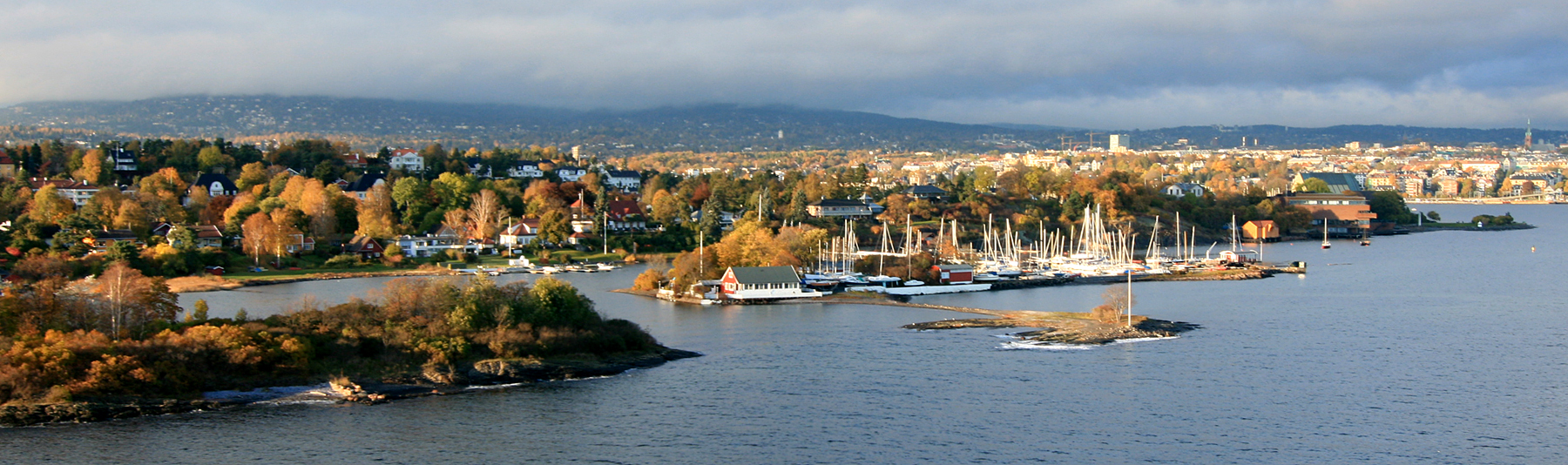
Bygdøy

Bygdøy or Bygdø is a peninsula situated on the western side of Oslo, Norway. Administratively, Bygdøy is part of the borough of Frogner. It historically was part of Aker Municipality and became part of Oslo in 1948.

Bygdøy is a popular recreation area and is among the most fashionable residential areas in Norway, where the most expensive properties in the entire country are found. Bygdøy is also the home of five national museums as well as a royal estate. Wealthy families of Christiania acquired country houses in Bygdøy during the 18th and 19th centuries; by the 19th century Bygdøy had become a favourite of the wealthy in the capital region and was exclusively settled by the wealthy and their servants.

== Tourism ==
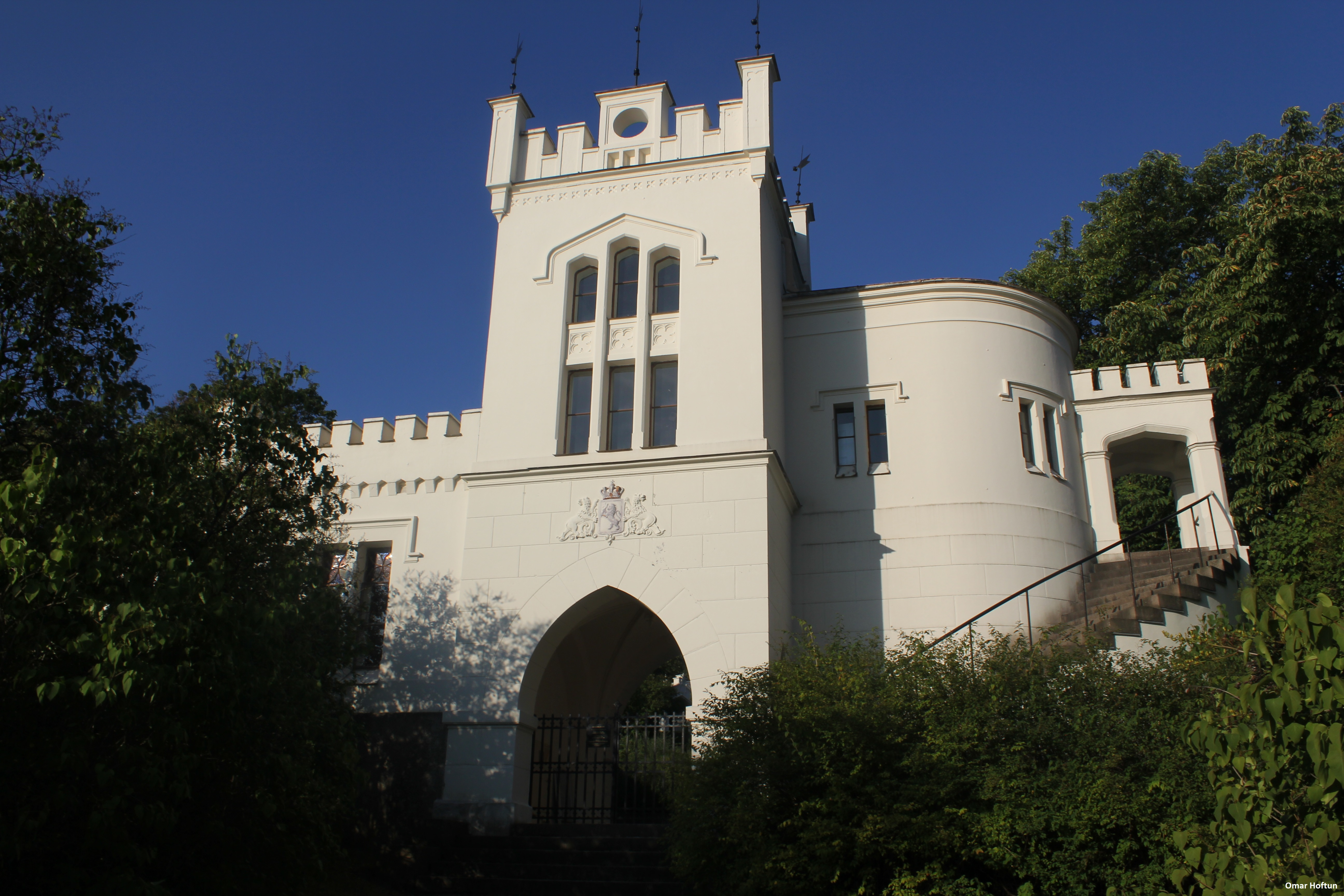
Oscarshall

Bygdøy has parks and forests, and beaches including the Huk ordinary and nudist beaches. In 1885 there were only 111 houses at Bygdøy; today most of the huge gardens are split into smaller patches of land, making Bygdøy largely a residential zone but retaining a profile of upscale demographics. Bygdøy Royal Estate (Bygdøy kongsgård), the official summer residence of the King of Norway, and Oscarshall, site of the Queen Joséphine Gallery, are also located here. Large parts of the area such as the Bygdøy Royal Estate are protected from development.

In the aftermath of the 2004 Indian Ocean tsunami, a memorial for the victims of the catastrophe was initiated by the Norwegian government. The memorial is located on the western shore of Bygdøy and was officially unveiled by HM King Harald V on 19 October 2007.

== Museums ==
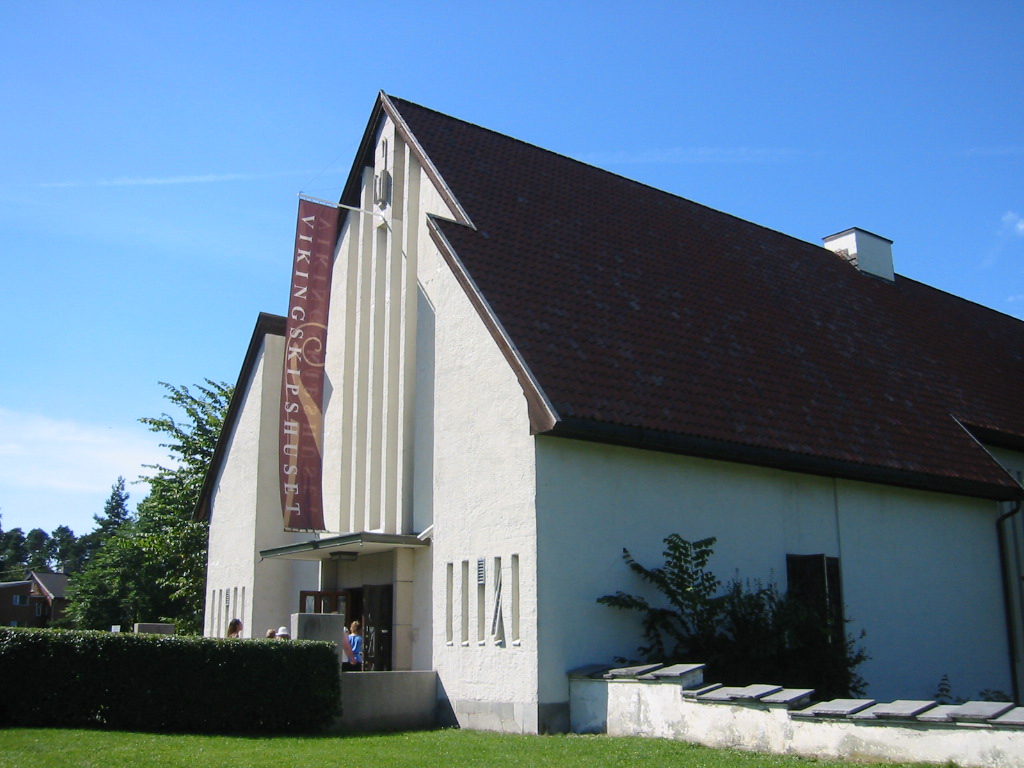
Viking Ship Museum

Bygdøy is the site of five museums:

- Kon-Tiki Museum (Kon-Tiki Museet) – houses exhibits from the expeditions of Thor Heyerdahl
- Norwegian Museum of Cultural History (Norsk Folkemuseum) – an open-air museum with buildings, relocated from towns and rural districts
- Viking Ship Museum (Vikingskipshuset) – houses the Oseberg ship, Gokstad ship and Tune ship
- Norwegian Maritime Museum (Norsk Maritimt Museum) – exhibits on coast culture and maritime history
- Fram Museum (Frammuseet) – site of the ship Fram used by Roald Amundsen

== Etymology ==
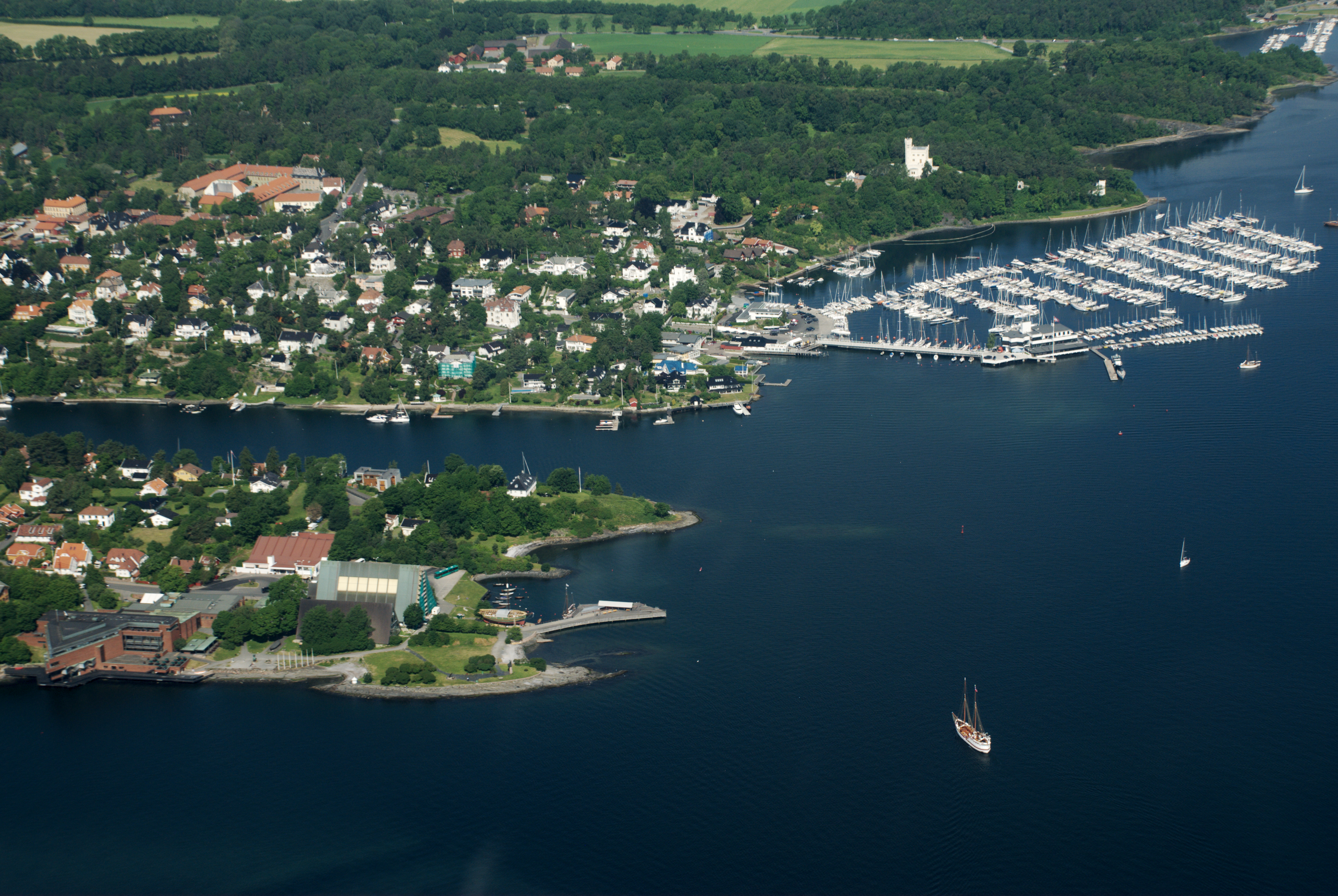
Aerial view of the eastern part Bygdøy

The name is from Norse times (Bygðey). The first element is bygð 'built district' (area with houses and population) – in Norse times this was the only inhabited island in the inner part of Oslofjord. The last element is ey 'island'. (Bygdøy was originally an island, but it became a peninsula because of post-glacial rebound.)

The island belonged to the Cistercian monastery at Hovedøya, but it was confiscated by the Crown in 1532. The name was then changed to "Ladegaardsøen". The first element in this new name was "ladegård" meaning "farm to give a manor (here Akershus fortress) income". The last element "-øen" is the Danish finite form of "ø" or "island". The old name was revived in 1877. It was first spelled "Bygdø", but from 1918 officially spelled "Bygdøy". However, the name Bygdø is preferred by many of its inhabitants and other West End inhabitants.

== Transportation ==
Bygdøy is accessible by bus, as the Oslo Public Transport Administration's bus line n.30 runs every 10 minutes from Nydalen via Sentrum and Nationaltheatret. Between April and October, the neighborhood can also be reached by the local public ferry departing from Aker Brygge every 30 minutes. Cars are allowed and there is a modest parking lot in front of the Kon-Tiki Museum.
