= HAV Eiendom =

HAV Eiendom AS
- Company type: Subsidiary
- Industry: Real estate
- Founded: 7 April 2003
- Headquarters: Oslo, Norway
- Area served: Bjørvika
- Owner: Oslo Port Authority
- Number of employees: 13 (2025)

HAV Eiendom AS is a stock-based company that is responsible for the urban redevelopment of the Bjørvika area of Oslo, Norway. Owned by the Oslo Port Authority, the former owner of the Bjørvika area, the company's goal is to "participate in the urban development of the Bjørvika area through development, rental, management, purchase and sale of real estate in the Bjørvika area". HAV Eiendom also has ownership interests in companies that run similar businesses and own 66 percent of Bjørvika Utvikling AS, which owns 100 percent of Bjørvika Infrastruktur AS. The company is also a minority owner of housing development in Bjørvika. The company was founded on 7 April 2003, in order to create a sustainable fjord city in Bjørvika and to make value for Oslo, the harbour, and society.

The foundation was dependent on a change in the law in acts relating to harbors and fairways (§ 23).

The company owns most of the real estate in Bjørvika, though parts have been sold to Statsbygg to build the Oslo Opera House. As of 2009, the company retains 15.6 hectares (39 acres) of land, and is able to develop 570,000 square metres (6,100,000 sq ft) of real estate. This includes the possibility of 5,000 apartments, in addition to commercial buildings and several of the countries largest cultural institutions, including the Stenersen Museum, the Munch Museum and Oslo Public Library. About 20,000 jobs will be located to Bjørvika. Most of the development will begin after 2010, when the Bjørvika Tunnel opens and the European Route E18 north of Bjørvika, including Bispelokket, is removed. The development of Sørengautstikkeren, a peninsula that sticks out form Bjørvika, has been sold to a private company, Sørenga Utvikling.

Along with Oslo S Utvikling, that will develop real estate on property owned by Bane NOR Eiendom in the north of Bjørvika, HAV Eiendom owns Bjørvika Utvikling. This company is responsible for overall planning and the development of infrastructure and public areas in Bjørvika. Since 2003 HAV Eiendom has given their owner Oslo Porth Authority 900 million Norwegian kroner in dividends, used to develop modern and more sustainable harbor activities.

With 900,000 square meters (9,600,000 sq ft) floor area of which 400,000 square meters (4,300,000 sq ft) is living space - which equals 5000 apartments - the zoning plan opens for building in the area of Bjørvika. Clemenskvartalet and C6 is amongst the housing projects that HAV Eiendom is developing in Bjørvika. In 2022 HAV Eiendom will present the new plans for developing Grønlikaia for approval. The plans consist of developing more than 200,000 square meters (2,100,000 sq ft) – primarily for apartments. In addition, the aim is to open a one-kilometer new seafront for the public.

HAV Eiendom has and will continue to develop more projects for industries in Bjørvika. This includes office spaces, hospitality, and other service provisions like Fiskebrygga, Sadelmakerhullet, and Sukkerbiten. HAV Eiendom will also build a primary and secondary school, Bjørvika school, scheduled for completion in 2023.

The development of HAV Eiendom’s properties in Bjørvika will extend over several years. The progress is coordinated with Oslo Porth Authority’s adopted plan on moving the port operations away from the area.
