= Sentrum, Oslo =

Coordinates: 59.9111°N 10.7333°E

Bydel Sentrum
- Borough
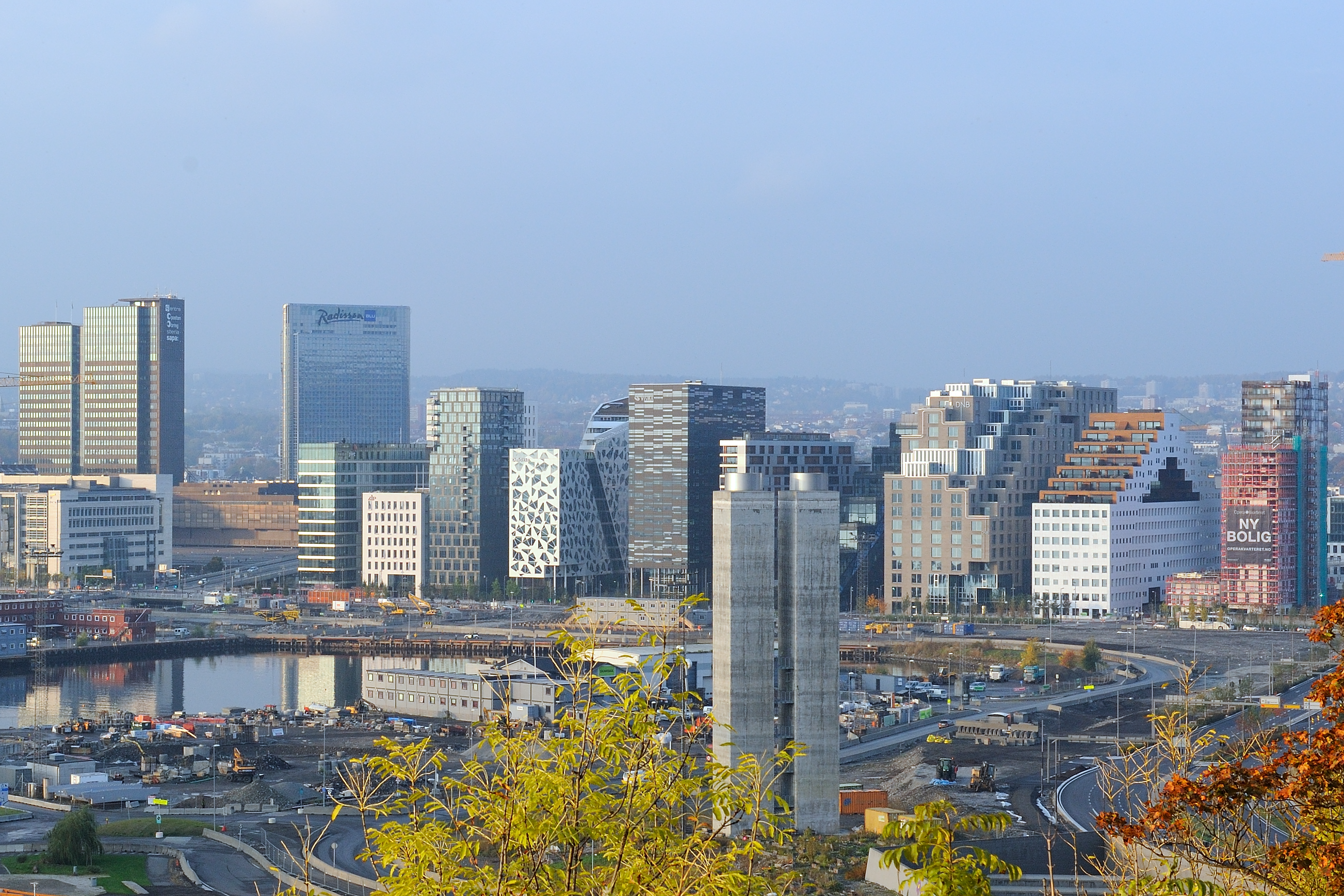

- Coat of arms

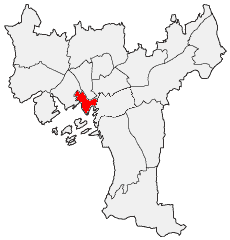
- Country: Norway
- City: Oslo

Area
  - Total: 1.8 km^{2} (0.69 sq mi)

Population (2020)
  - Total: 1,471
  - Density: 817/km^{2} (2,120/sq mi)
- Time zone: UTC+1 (CET)
  - Summer (DST): UTC+2 (CEST)
- ISO 3166 code: NO-030116
- Website: oslo.kommune.no

Sentrum, meaning city-centre, is located on the southeast side of Oslo near the inner Oslofjord.

The district is dominated by high rises like Postgirobygget and The Plaza. Oslo's Central Station is located on the eastern side of the borough. Sentrum consists of Bjørvika which has a history as Oslo's main harbour. The area is now being rebuilt with modern high rises consisting of the Barcode and also several student apartments, schools and museums. Sentrum is not a borough with an administration. It is partially administered by St. Hanshaugen, and in part directly by the city council. The borough St. Hanshaugen takes care of health and social services.

== Waterfront ==
The waterfront near what was once a harbour is now a cultural centre and where the Oslo Opera House is located. An artificial island is being constructed together with an artificial beach near the Opera. The Munch Museum which replaced the museum at Tøyen is located on the right side of the Opera House. Several canals are built in the apartment district east of the upcoming Munch Museum.

== The Centre ==
The tallest buildings in the city are located in the innermost part of Sentrum. Spektrum is located here. Spektrum is one of the major staging facilities in Oslo. Sentrum is located near the Plaza. Several media companies are located here. Various magazines and companies such as Aftenposten, which offices are located in Postgirobygget and TV Norge. An entrance to the Oslo Central Station is located here and Oslo Bus Terminal is being rebuilt and currently serves at the main bus terminal in the city. Oslo City is a large shopping mall located near Spektrum. It is a large mall and currently the third largest mall in the Oslo district.
