= Barcode Project =

Office building precinct in Oslo, Norway

Coordinates: 59°54′28″N 10°45′34″E

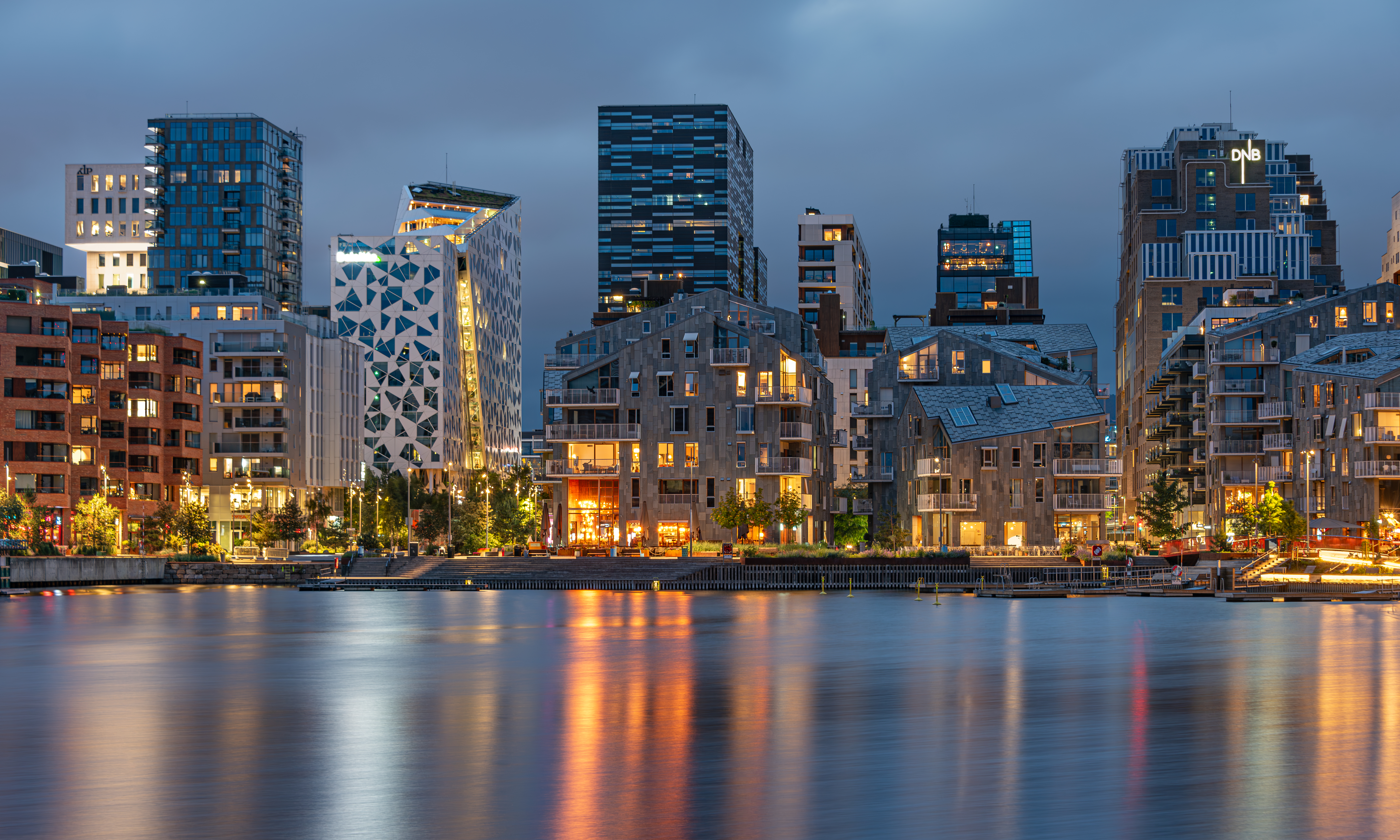
Barcode buildings seen from Sørenga, June 2026

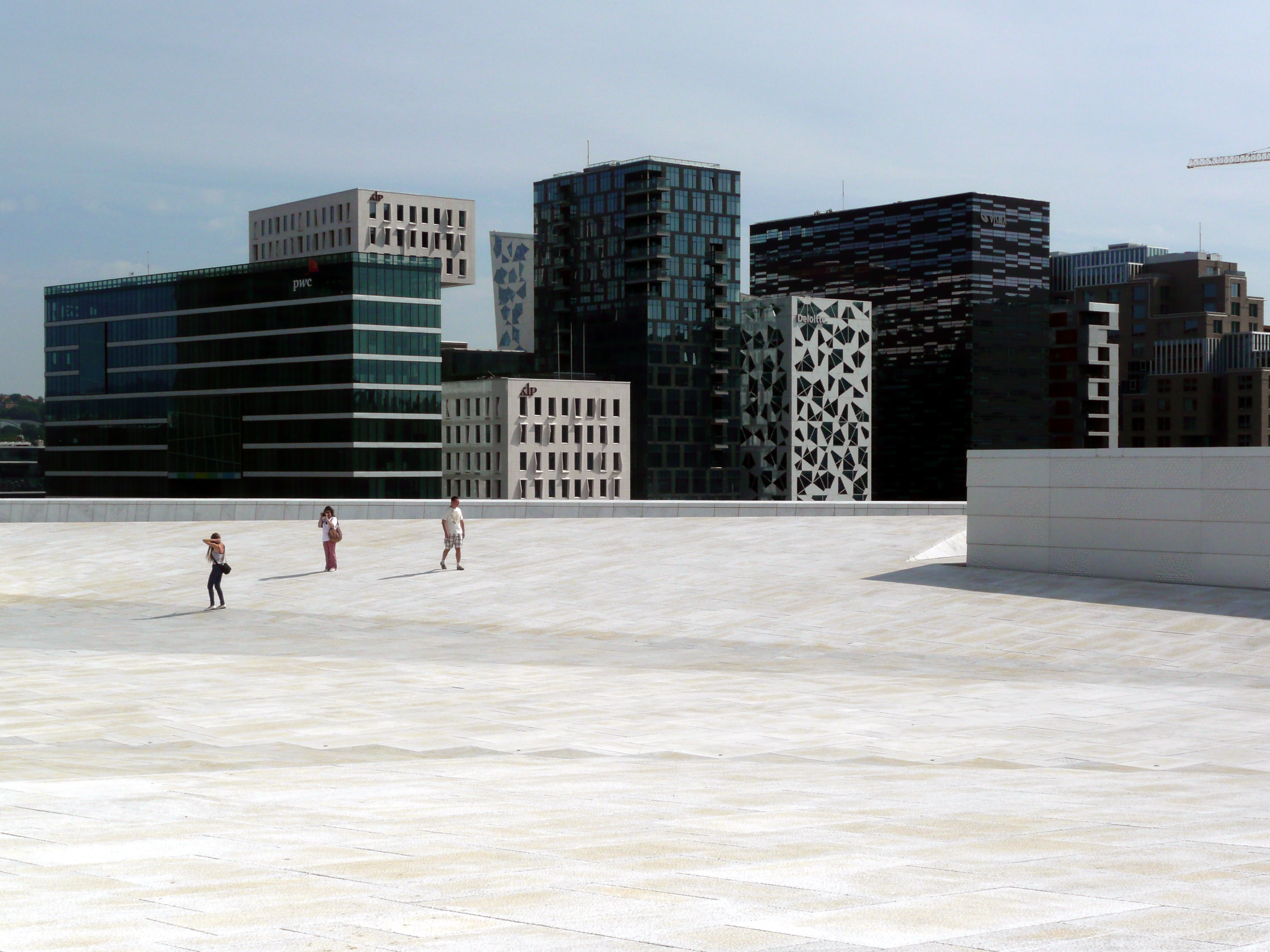
As seen from the roof of the Oslo Opera House. The outline of the district is reminiscent of a barcode.

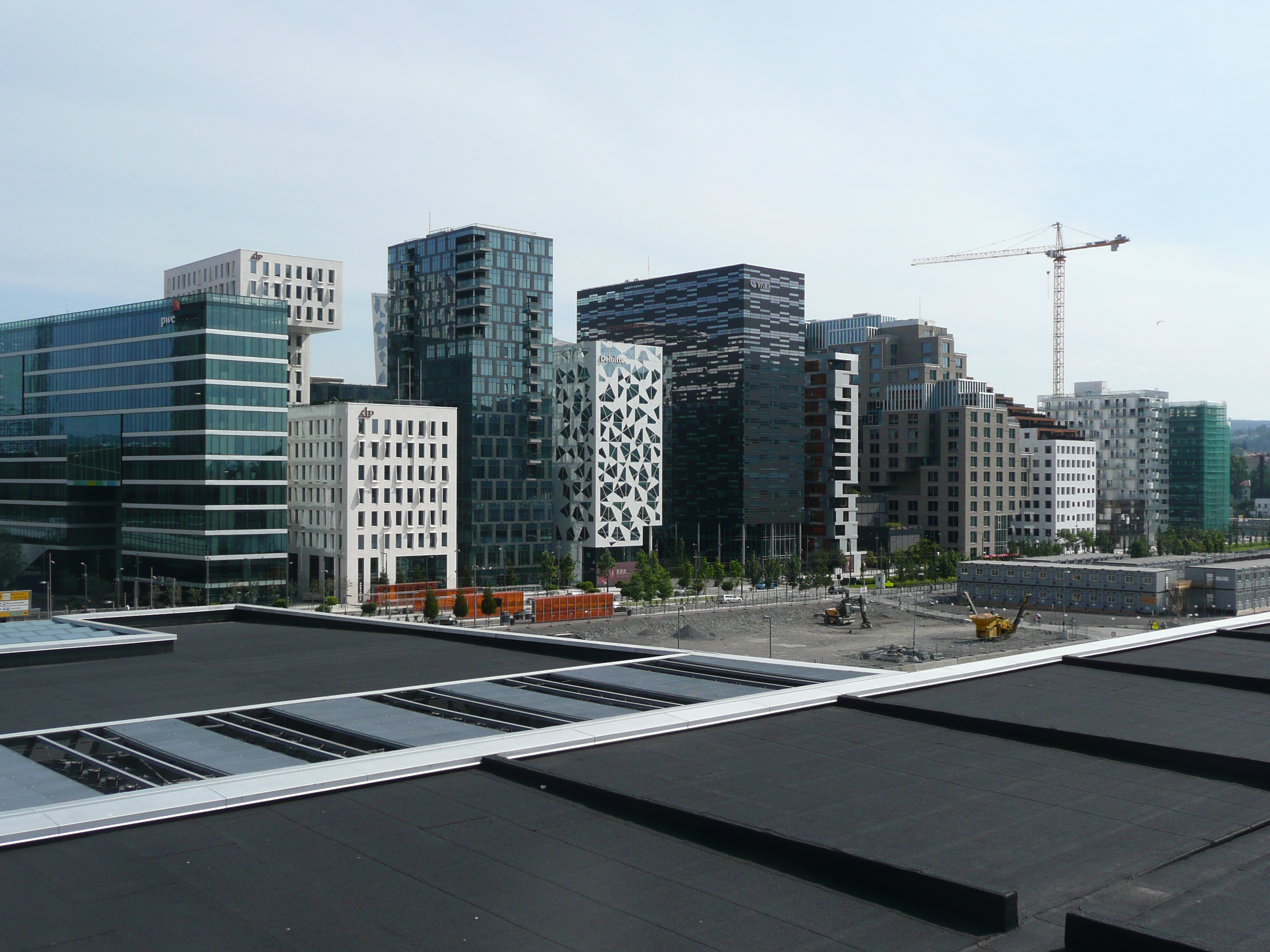
The Barcode buildings in 2015

The Barcode Project is a section of the Bjørvika portion of the Fjord City redevelopment on former dock and industrial land in central Oslo. It consists of a row of new multi-purpose high-rise buildings, that was completed in 2016. The developer is marketing the project as "The Opera Quarter." There has been intense public debate about the height and shape of the buildings.

== Land ownership and responsibility for development ==
Oslo S Utvikling AS (abbreviated OSU) is responsible for the development of the Barcode. OSU is a subsidiary of Entra Eiendom AS (government property management organization), Linstow Eiendom (privately owned) and ROM Eiendom AS (the Norwegian State Railways' property management arm).

== Location ==
The Barcode buildings are between Dronning Eufemias gate (Queen Eufemia's Street), which will be the main east–west thoroughfare in the Bjørvika neighborhood and is a stretch of what is currently Bispegata, and Trelastgata (Timber Street, a new street that during planning was also called Sporgata, Track Street), which will run alongside the rail lines to Oslo Central Station on the northern edge of the development. A line of apartment buildings will be between Dronning Eufemias gate and the Oslofjord, where the new Oslo Opera House has already been built.

== Planning and description ==
The Barcode buildings occupy areas B10 through B13 of the general plan for the Bjørvik neighborhood that was adopted by the Oslo City Council in 2003—in the Bispevika section, east of the mouth of the Akerselva River. The general plan was based on an international competition to plan the new Bjørvika, which was won by Dark Architects (of Oslo), a-lab, and MVRDV (of Rotterdam).

The general plan specified five high-rise buildings, the tallest in area B11, closest to the Station Common (a new public square and bridge giving access to Central Station), rising to 100 m above sea level ("contour 100") and having approximately 24 floors. The other towers were specified to be lower in height: 70 m in area B13, 78 m in B10, and 81 m in B12. The buildings were described as a geometric system of volumes based on penetrating strips of empty space. The building plan for the Barcode buildings was approved by the city in March 2008 with few changes from the 2006 proposal.

The Barcode has been planned as a row of different buildings with views between them. The unbuilt spaces between the buildings are to be at least 12 m wide. Several of the buildings will have fewer floors facing the fjord than the railway. The buildings are long and narrow (for example, DnB building B is 21 m wide and 105 long). The stated purpose of choosing such dissimilar building forms is to avoid a massive wall between the fjord and the buildings behind the Barcode, and that the Barcode principle, with segmented construction, will contribute to openness, light penetration, and transparency in the built-up area. The buildings will have a shared basement, entered from Trelastgata.

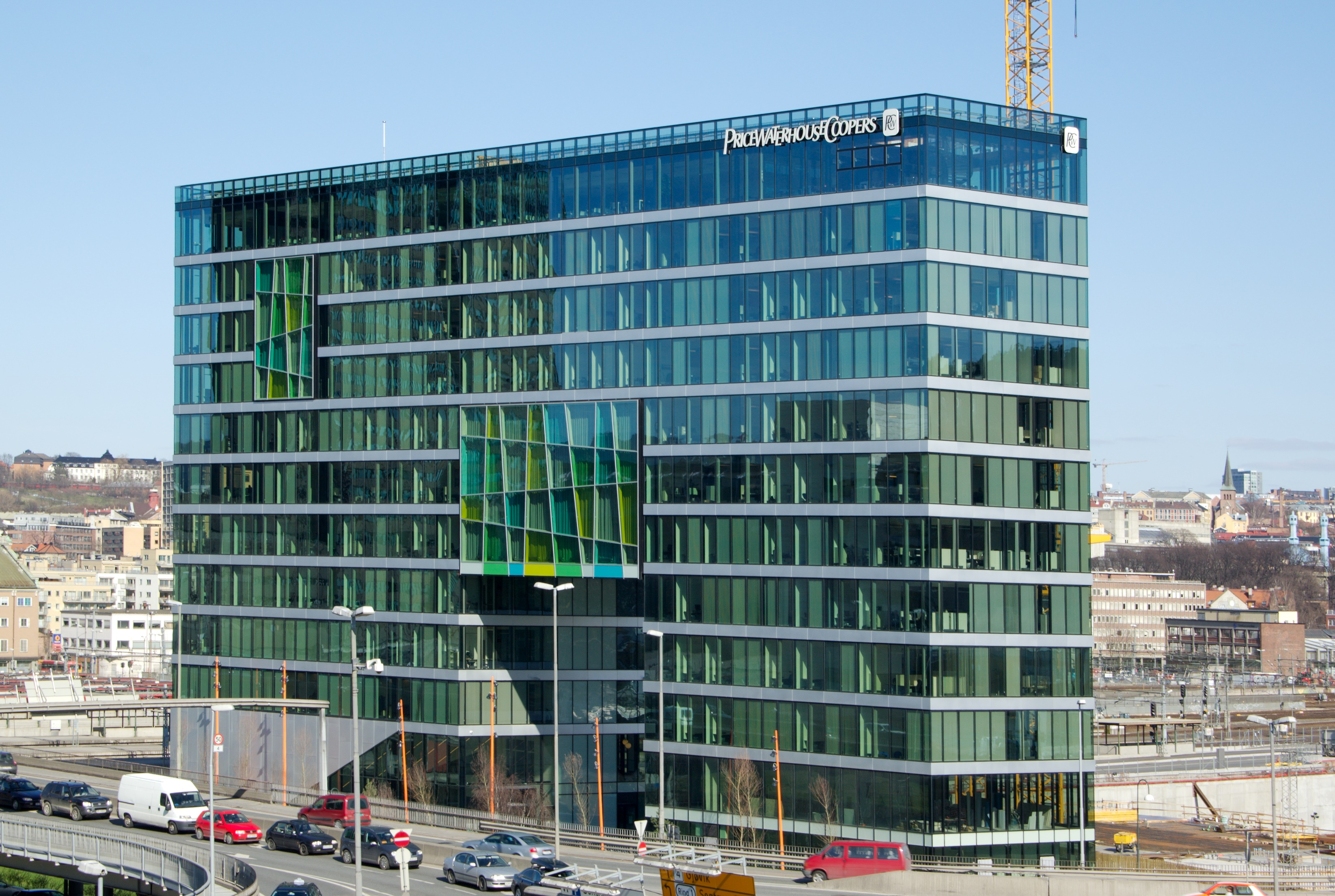
PriceWaterHouseCoopers Building, 2008

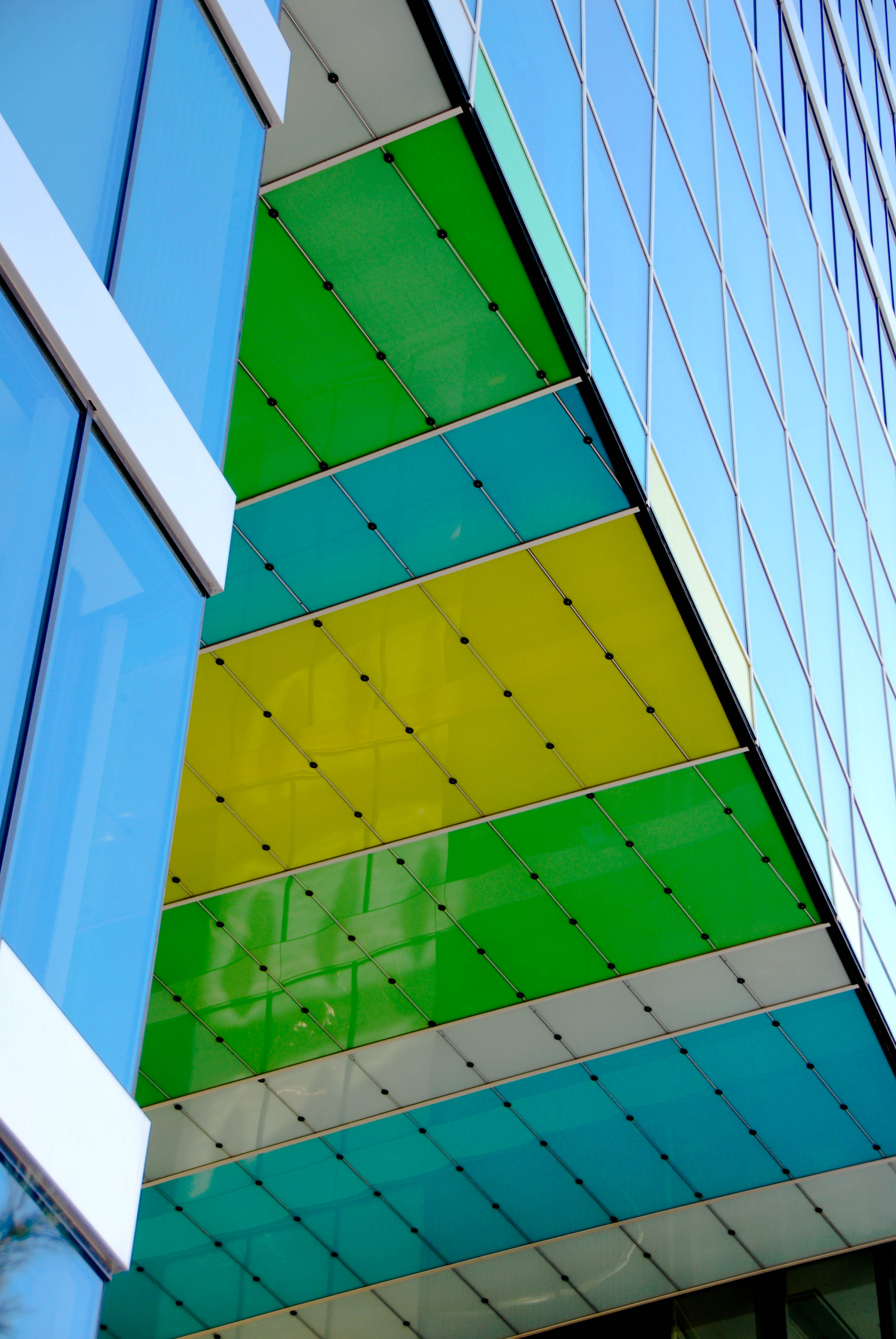
Closeup of PWC Building

The Barcode buildings are, from west to east:

1. PriceWaterhouseCoopers (PWC) Building. 18 floors. Architects: a-lab. 12 floors. A glass structure of simple form with a central entrance five storeys high affording views through the building, and 3-storey voids within the building visible from the exterior. The first Barcode building to be completed. In April 2008 a-lab won the "Europe 40 under 40" prize in part on the basis of this design.
2. Kommunal Landspensjonskasse (KLP) Building. 2 overlapping segments in contrasting materials and of differing shapes separated by a column of glass, varying between 8 and 18 floors. 31,700 sq. m. Architects: Solheim & Jacobsen (SJ). The western tower will contain 54 luxury apartments and the eastern the KLP offices. The building will have 5 roof surfaces, 3 of which will be gardens, the other two passive planting.
3. Deloitte Building. 16,950 sq. m. Architects: Snøhetta. This building will be between the KLP Building and the Station Common and will provide services associated with the station, probably including restaurants, on its lowest floors. It will be tall and narrow and the surface realized half in glass, half in dense elements. Its form was inspired by a calving glacier and it was initially referred to as "the Glacier."
4. Visma Building. Three office towers joined by two columnar glass atria, varying between 12 and 17 floors. 20,800 sq. m. Architects: Dark Arkitekter. The cladding is to make it hard to read the number of floors from the exterior, a so-called "pixel facade."
5. DnB NOR Building. Architects: MVRDV, Dark Arkitekter and a-lab. Three buildings linked by a below-ground "street" area, with restaurants and other shared areas on the first and second floors. Building A: 37,000 sq. m., architect: MVRDV and co-architects Dark Arkitekter. The center building and the new headquarters of the financial company. Offices will be grouped around voids and the exterior cladding will be 6-meter square "pixels." Building B: 22,500 sq. m. Architect: a-lab. The eastern building, on the longest site, will be set back behind a plaza on Dronning Eufemias gate and have offices on the lower floors, apartments with terraces on the upper floors. Building C: 14 floors, 13,000 sq. m. Architect: Dark Arkitekter. The western DnB NOR tower will be stepped, with a restaurant, bar, and terrace on the top floor accessible from Dronning Eufemias gate. The building will be clad in glass reflective panels tilted at slightly differing angles to reflect different fractions of the surrounding scenery. To open 2012.

The Barcode buildings are to include 145,000 sq. m. of work spaces (of approximately 410,000 in Bjørvika as a whole), providing 10,000 jobs. As of May 2010, the number of apartments in the Barcode is unclear, but possibly around 450. Approximately 20% of the space is to consist of about 380 apartments, projected to house some 2,000 people. The first apartments (in the KLP Building) were occupied in May 2010. The 12,000 sq. m. of retail space is planned to include numerous boutiques, brasseries and art galleries.

== Public debate ==
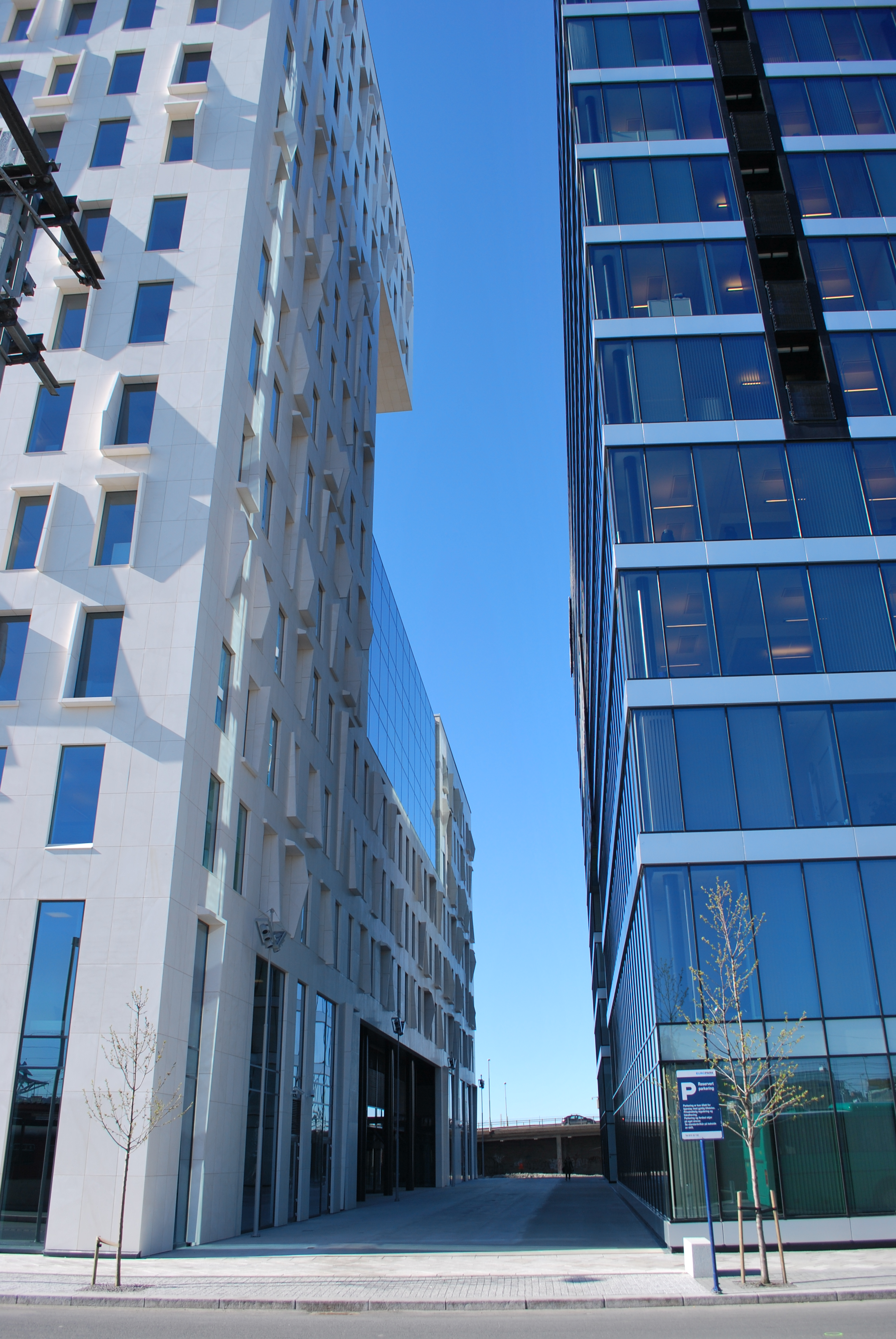
PWC Building (right) and KLP Building (left), seen from Trelastgata

Some are enthusiastic about the fresh architecture, the "champagne apartments," and the unmatched opportunity to reshape the urban landscape and relieve pressure on a rapidly growing city without diminishing existing green space. However, there has been widespread criticism of the heights and designs of the Barcode buildings, both from architects and from citizens of Oslo. The Barcode has been described as a barrier between the fjord and the rest of the city that will destroy Oslo's character as an open, low-rise city with a lot of green space and cast a permanent shadow on adjacent neighborhoods for the benefit of a rich few. The architecture has been described as chaotic, as part of a trend of spectacular buildings, which within a few years will be seen as having disfigured the city. In addition to the disruption of the very large building site, the project has been described as hostile to the urban life of the city: unbalanced in favor of private business space and with too few shopping and eating opportunities for the public, and narrow, corridor-like passages between the buildings.

The project "is among the most protested ... ever in Oslo". A petition campaign in opposition to the building of the high-rises received over 30,000 signatures in 2007, and according to a survey by Aftenposten in December of the same year, 71% of the population of Oslo opposed the project. In 2008 a charrette was organized to find alternatives.

== Archaeological discovery ==
During work on the Barcode project, the remains of at least nine wrecked ships were uncovered, up to 18 m long and provisionally dated to the first half of the 16th century. This is the largest collection of historical shipwrecks found in Norway. The Barcode site, like the rest of the Bjørvika neighborhood, was underwater until the mid-19th century. Approximately 1,100 clay pipes, Chinese porcelain, and other artefacts were also found. The Norwegian Maritime Museum has a selection on exhibit.
