= Sørengautstikkeren =

Neighborhood in Oslo, Norway

Coordinates: 59.9024°N 10.754°E

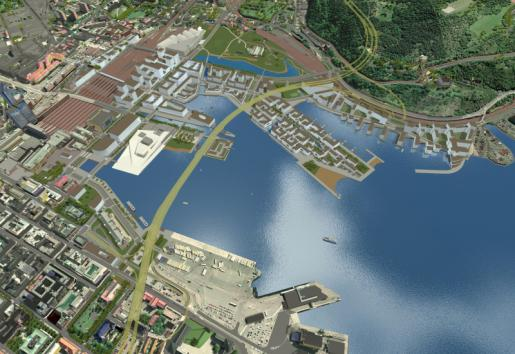
Illustration of the tunnel

Sørengautstikkeren is a neighborhood in the borough Gamle Oslo in Oslo, Norway. It is an artificial peninsula that sticks out into the Oslofjord form Bjørvika and Sørenga. It is part of the Port of Oslo, but will be redeveloped as part of the Fjord City urban redevelopment program, after the Bjørvika Tunnel is completed in 2010, and the European Route E18 will run under the area. Until then, it is used as a container port, a quay for cruise ships and as a storage area for earth and bulk. The quay is 880 metres (2,890 ft) long.

The redevelopment is organized by Sørenga Utvikling and HAV Eiendom, a subsidiary of the Port of Oslo. The area was sold from the port to Sørenga Utvikling for 940 million kr. Sørenga Utvikling is owned by Backe Prosjekt, USBL, Oslo Areal, and financial investors. Four architect companies, LPO arkitekter, Jarmund/Vigsnæs, Arkitektselskapet Kari Nissen Brodtkorb and MAD, will each receive two blocks to design. Forty-seven companies had offered bids in the contest. The four companies will cooperate to create a common identify for the buildings. Construction will start in 2009, and will be completed by 2011 or 2012. The area is planned to feature 950 new apartments, plus some commercial areas, including some stores. The Sørenga area will have 100,000 square metres (1,100,000 sq ft) of buildings. The apartments will be among the most expensive in the country, as they are located within walking distance of the city core.
