= Bispelokket =

Road interchange in Oslo, Norway

Coordinates: 59.9080°N 10.7553°E

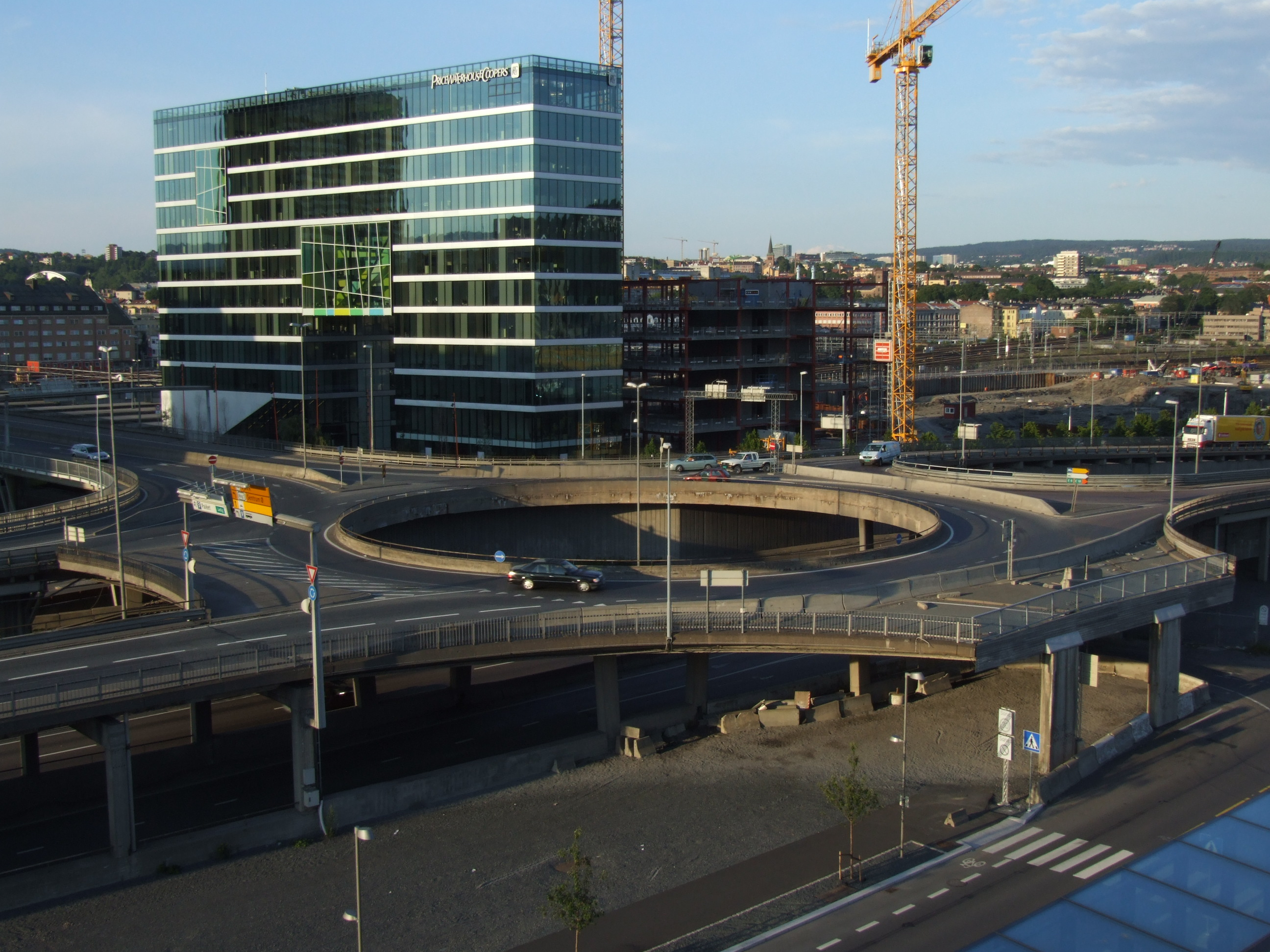
Bispelokket

Bispelokket (literally "bishops lid") was a Norwegian three-level stack interchange roundabout in Bjørvika, Oslo. European Route E18 and Norwegian National Road 162 (until 2010: National Road 4) jointed at this point, which also served as the official traffical centre of the city. The new roundabout at Postgirobygget is from October 31, 2011, the new traffical centre of Oslo.

Bispelokket gradually opened between 1966 and 1968, and was visited by at the most 140,000 vehicles a day until Bjørvikatunnelen was introduced as a complete tunnel system in 2010 and the amount declined to 40,000. Bispelokket ceased to function as a roundabout on October 28, 2011, at 10 pm. The physical demolition was launched by the Norwegian prime minister Jens Stoltenberg, November 4, 2011, at 1:46 pm. As a complex road intersection, Bispelokket was not recognized as an aesthetical suitable landmark in the cityline of Oslo.

Sinsenkrysset is from October 31 the most visited Norwegian road intersection by 100,000 vehicles a day.

== Demolition ==
As a part of the Fjord City urban renewal project, Bispelokket (including all its ramps and the Nylandsvegen bridge) was demolished in 2012 to make way for the redevelopment of the Bjørvika waterfront into a business and residential area.
