= Grønlia =

Neighborhood in Oslo, Norway

Coordinates: 59.900°N 10.757°E

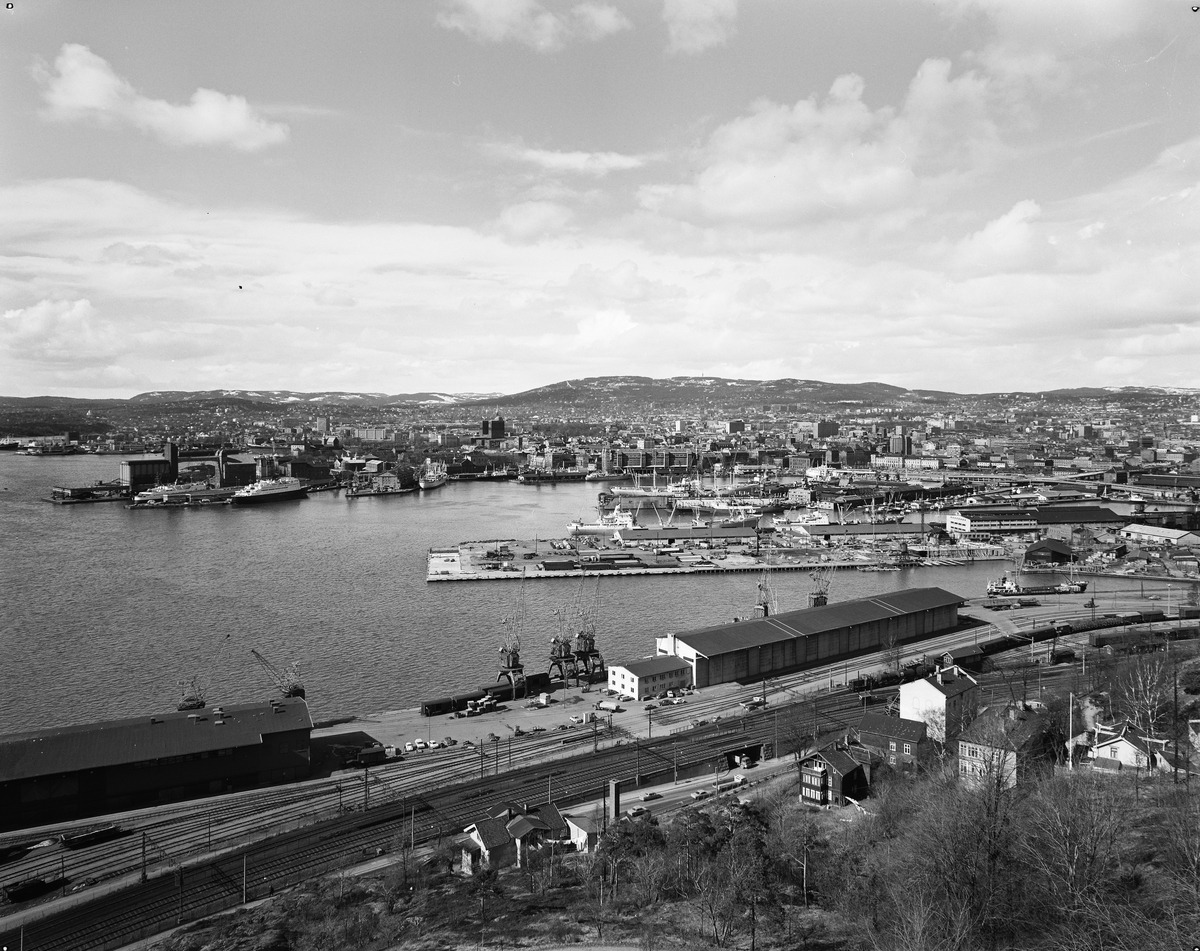
View of Grønlia

Grønlia is a neighborhood in the Oslo borough of Gamle Oslo. It is located below Ekebergåsen, along the Oslofjord, south of Sørenga, and north of Kongshavn.

The area is dominated by the Port of Oslo and railway tracks. As part of the Fjord City urban renewal program, the area will become a residential area.
