= Fjord, Norway =

Fjord, Norway may refer to:

- Fjord City, a project for urban renewal in the city of Oslo
- Fjord Municipality, a municipality in Møre og Romsdal county
- Fjords of Norway
- Norway also has numerous placenames that include the suffix "-fjord."
