= Postgirobygget =

Postgirobygget may refer to:

- Postgirobygget (building), a building in Oslo, Norway
- Postgirobygget (band), a Norwegian band
