= Fjord City =

Urban renewal project for the waterfront of Oslo, Norway

Coordinates: 59°54′30″N 10°45′14″E

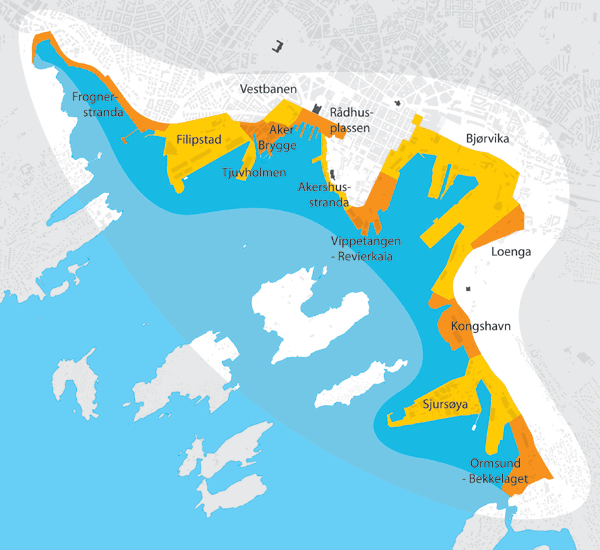
Map of the Fjord City

The Fjord City (Norwegian: Fjordbyen) is an urban renewal project for the waterfront part of the centre of Oslo, Norway. The first redevelopment was at Aker Brygge during the 1980s. Bjørvika and Tjuvholmen followed up during the 2000s, while the remaining parts of the Port of Oslo will be developed in the 2010s. The port will be relocated to Sørhavna. The planning is performed by the Oslo Waterfront Planning Office. Major investments in the area include a new Central Railway Station, an already completed Oslo Opera House, and the commercial buildings in the Barcode Project. Several large cultural institutions will be moved to Bjørvika, including moving the Oseberg Ship, Oslo Public Library, and the Munch Museum. The main barrier between the city and the fjord will disappear when European Route E18 is relocated to the Bjørvika Tunnel.

== Projects ==
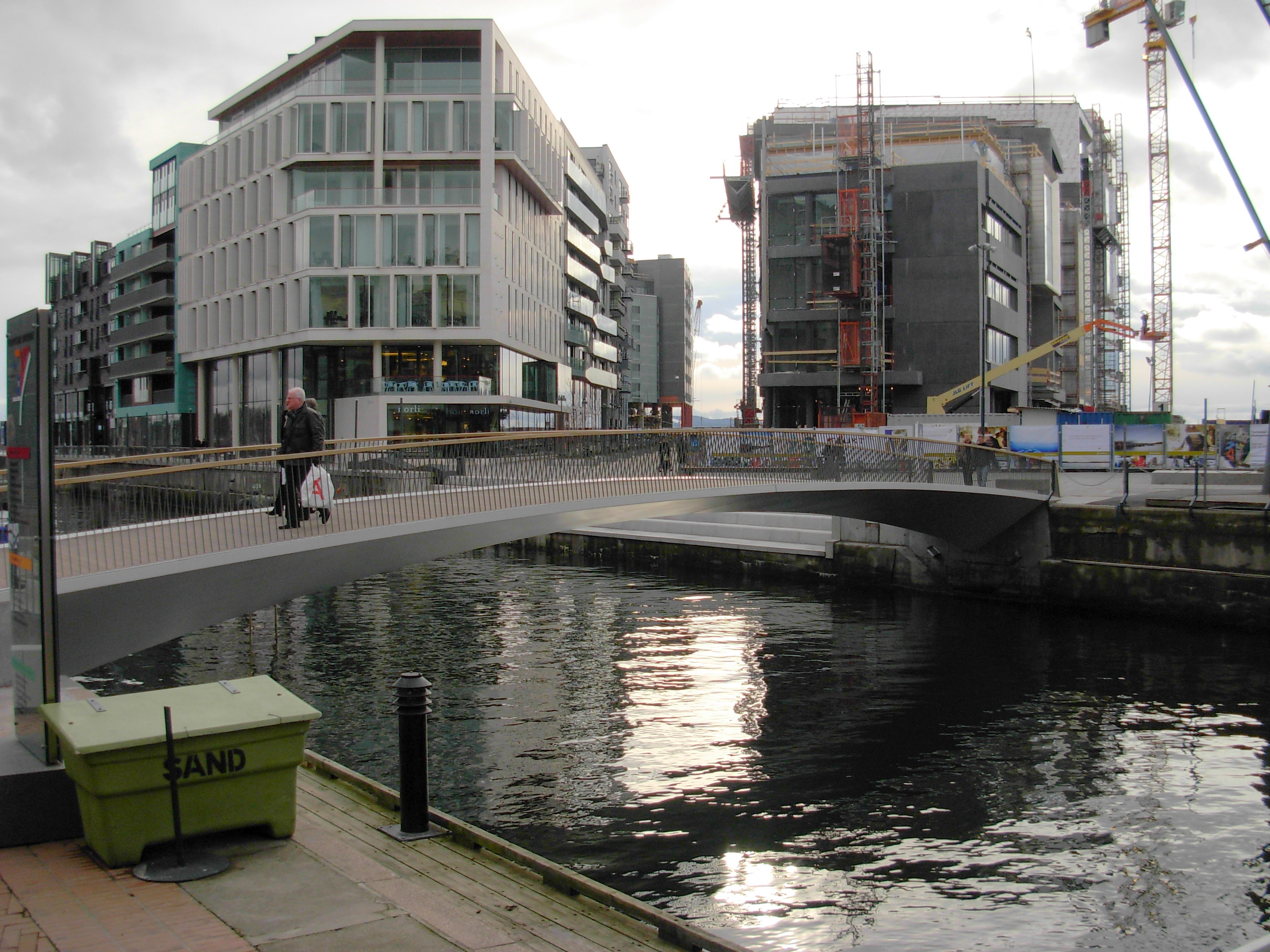
Tjuvholmen

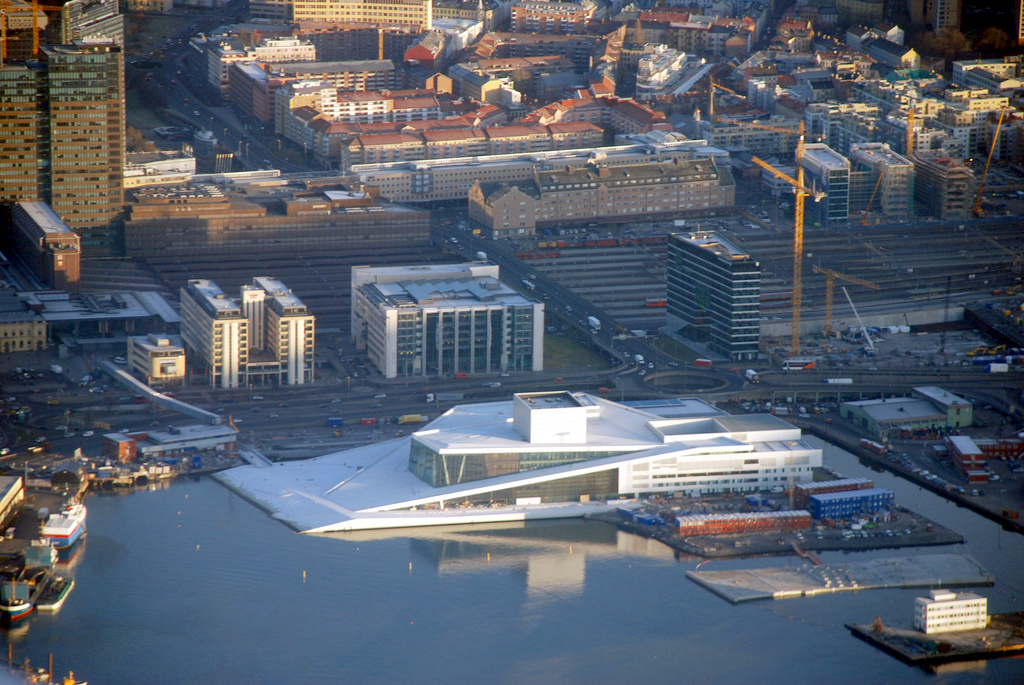
Bjørvika

Development of the Tjuvholmen commenced in 2008. This is a mixed residential and commercial area, and home to the Norwegian National Academy of Ballet.

Filipstad, a 32 hectares (79 acres) container port, will receive a 5 hectares (12 acres) park, and 450,000 square metres (4,800,000 sq ft) of buildings. 50% of the area will be housing, providing 2,200 apartments.

Aker Brygge, developed during the 1980s, is also a mixture of residential and commercial zones. It contains the corporate headquarters of several of Norway's largest companies, including DnB NOR, Aker, and Storebrand. Vestbanen rail terminal will host the National Museum of Art, Architecture and Design and the Nobel Peace Center.

The City Hall Square transport hub and Pipervika neighbourhood were renewed in the 1960s, when the surrounding slums were removed. In 1994, the main square became car-free, after the opening of the Festning Tunnel.

Vippetangen and Akershusstranda will receive little renewal, since the area features the national monument of Akershus Fortress.

Bjørvika harbour will be extensively renovated following European Route E18 being moved to the Bjørvika Tunnel. This will free up large areas, and a new main avenue, Dronning Eufemias gate, will be constructed. South of the street is the new Oslo Opera House (opened in 2008), and the area will also feature the Munch Museum, the Stenersen Museum and the Oslo Public Library. North of the street, there will be twelve skyscrapers. Oslo Central Station will be completely rebuilt, and only the tracks and platforms will be preserved.

Sørengautstikkeren, Loenga, and Grønlia were part of the port and railway infrastructure. Grønlia and Sørenga will lose the port facilities, and will mainly be zoned as residential areas. Loenga will retain some railway infrastructure.

Kongshavn, Sjursøya, Ormsund, and Bekkelaget were previously planned as part of the Fjord City, but have been removed from the plans and will continue to be part of the port.

== Transport ==
The main transport link to Fjord City will be the Oslo Tramway. The first part was opened in 1995, when the Vika Line was built to serve Vika, Aker Brygge, and The City Hall Square. After 2014, the plan is to reroute the Ekeberg Line via Dronning Eufemias gate, and a new tram line will be constructed around Vippetangen.

Filipstad and Vippetangen will continue as ports for cruiseferries. Oslo Fergene will continue to operate their water buses from Vippetangen and Rådhusbrygga. Nesodden–Bundefjord Dampskipsselskap will continue to operate from Aker Brygge.

European Route E18 will be moved into tunnels. The first part, the Festning Tunnel under The City Hall Square and Vippetangen, opened in 1990. The Bjørvika Tunnel opened in 2010, and connects to Mosseveien and the Ekeberg Tunnel.
