= Bane NOR Eiendom =

Subsidiary of Bane NOR

Bane NOR Eiendom AS
- Company type: Subsidiary
- Industry: Real estate
- Founded: 2001
- Headquarters: Oslo, Norway
- Area served: Norway
- Key people: Jon-Erik Lunøe (CEO)
- Revenue: ▲NOK 723 million (2009)
- Number of employees: 95
- Parent: Bane NOR
- Website: banenoreiendom.no

Bane NOR Eiendom (Rail NOR Property) is a subsidiary of Bane NOR responsible for managing the commercial sections of the company's real estate. With headquarters in Oslo, the company manages 740,000 square metres (8,000,000 sq ft) of space. The vast majority of this is in or in connection with railway stations. The company owns all of the railway stations in Norway.

Rom Eiendom was established in 2001 as Rom Eiendomsutvikling, with the responsibility to manage all NSB real estate not related to operations. In 2001, the management was outsourced to Aberdeen Property Investors. The present name change came as a result of the management being insourced back to the corporation in 2006. In 2007, NSB Eiendom, which owned operational real estate, was merged into Rom. Within the portfolio of Rom are large sections of the real estate at Bjørvika in Oslo and Brattøra in Trondheim, both part of the ports in the cities, which are being transformed through urban redevelopment projects. Rom owns about 70 lots with a potential for 2 million square meters (20 million ft^{2}) of building space.

On May 2, 2017, the ownership of Rom Eiendom was transferred to Bane NOR as part of a national rail reform plan, and the company was rebranded as Bane NOR Eiendom. As a result, properties formerly belonging to the Norwegian National Rail Administration and Bane NOR were transferred to Bane NOR Eiendom.
