= Sørenga =

Historical neighborhood in Oslo, Norway

Coordinates: 59.905°N 10.7657°E

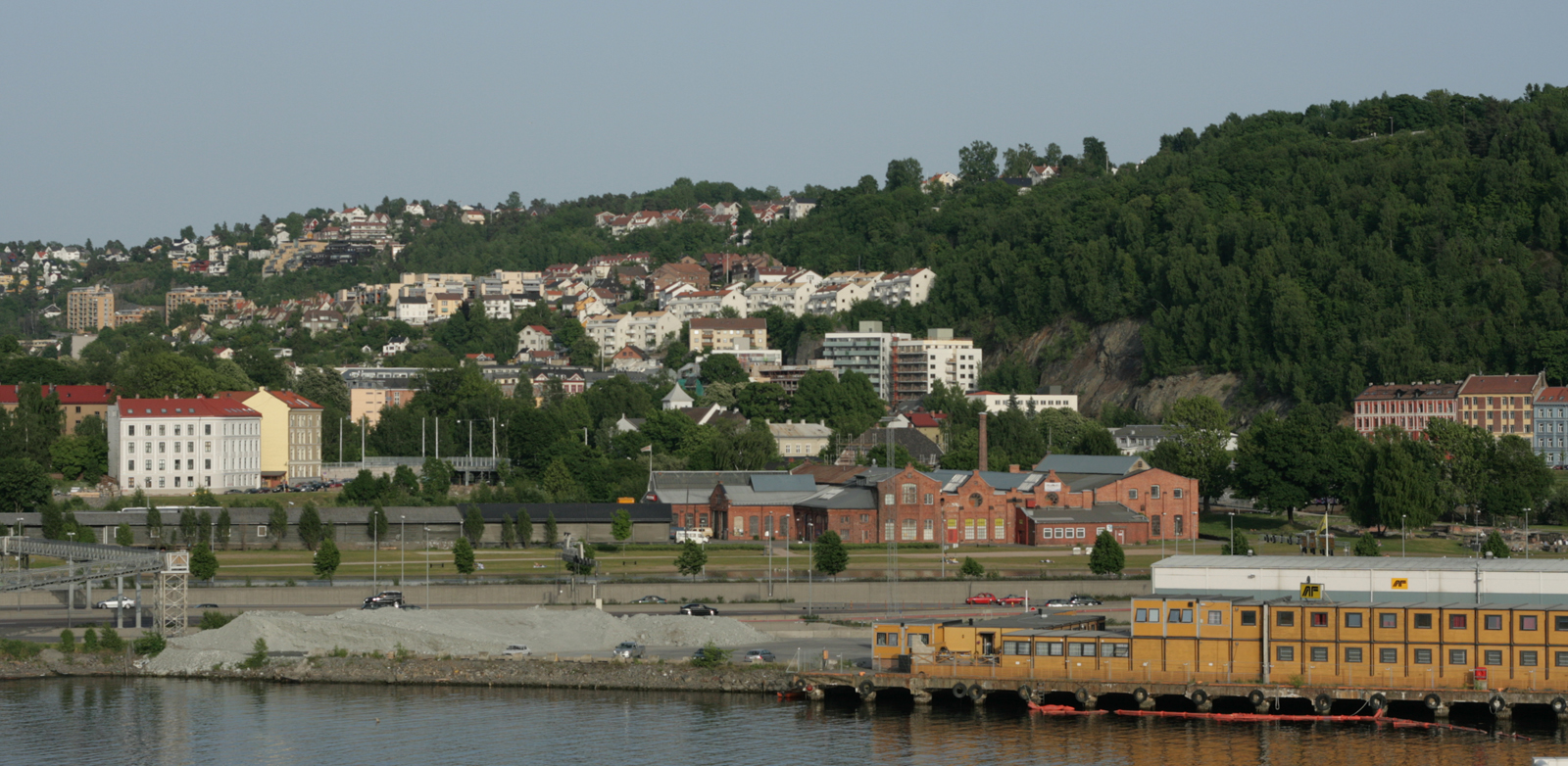
Sørenga

Sørenga is a neighborhood in Gamlebyen in Oslo, Norway. It is located east of Bjørvika, west of Vannspeilet, south of the street Bispegata and Oslo torg, and west and north of the Alna River. South of the area the Sørengautstikkeren runs out into the Oslo Fjord.
