= Bjørvika =

Neighborhood in Oslo, Norway

Coordinates: 59°54′26″N 10°44′57″E

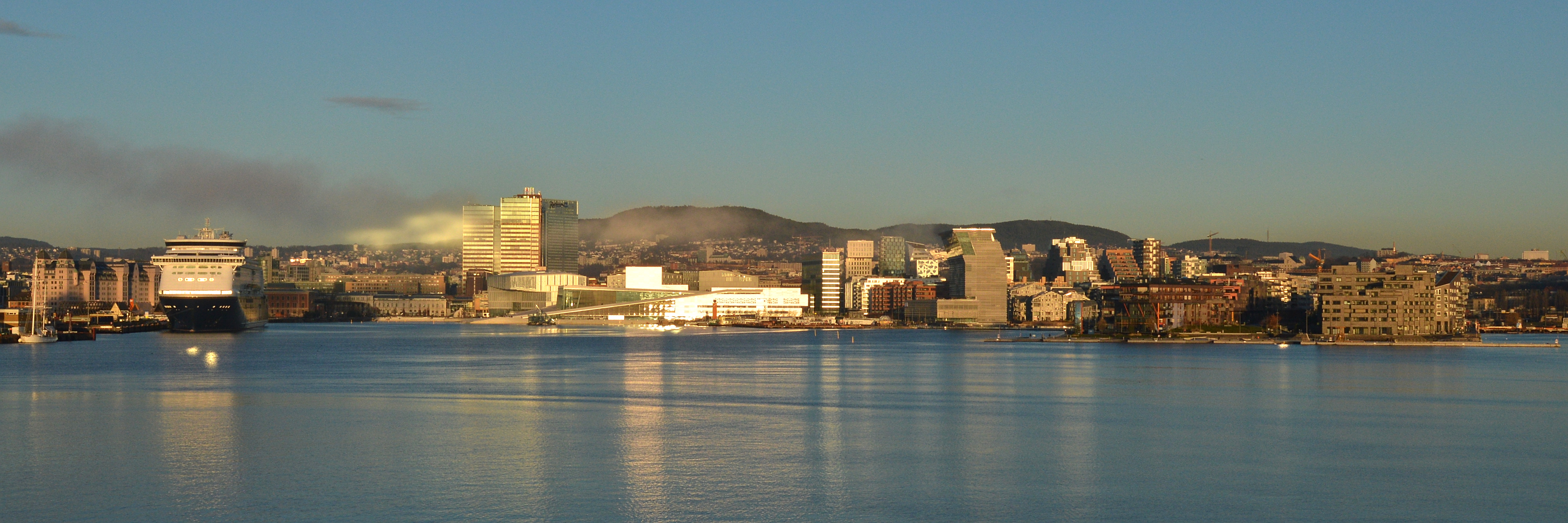
Panorama view of Bjørvika, December 2020, with the Oslo Opera House at its center

Bjørvika is a neighborhood in the Sentrum borough of Oslo, Norway. The area is an inlet in the inner Oslofjord, situated between Gamlebyen and Akershus Fortress. It serves as an outlet for the river Akerselva. Since the 2000s, it has been undergoing urban redevelopment, being transformed from a container port. When completed, the Bjørvika neighborhood will be a new cultural and urban center in Oslo. The multi-purpose medium-rises of the Barcode Project dominates the skyline to the north; to the east the residential area of Sørenga is under construction. The National Opera is located at Bjørvika, and both the Oslo Public Library and the Munch/Stenersen museum are situated in this neighbourhood, the latter replacing the old Munch Museum in 2020.

== Name ==
The Norse form of the name was Bjárvík. The first element is the genitive of býr, "town, city" (modern Norwegian by); the last element is vík, "inlet, bay."

== History ==
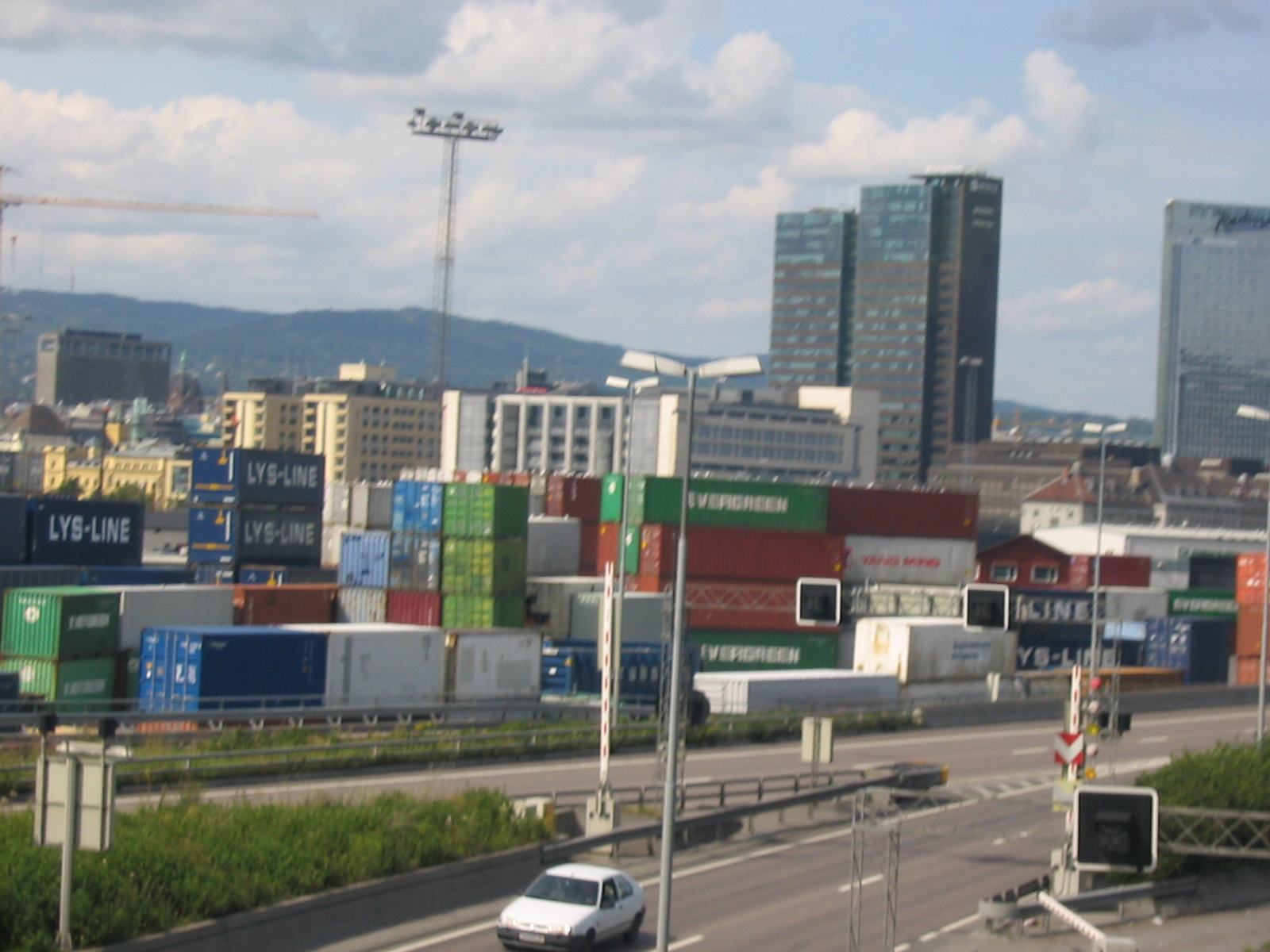
Bjørvika has traditionally been a port

Oslo was first established in the 11th century in the area around where the Alna River flows into the Oslofjord, due to the strategic location both with regard to transport, trade and military. The place became the seat of a bishop in 1100. By 1300, the population had reached about 3000. Construction of Akershus Fortress started in 1299. At the time, the city was mainly made of wooden buildings, and had six churches, three monasteries and two manors: one for the king and one for the bishop. The city declined during the 15th and 16th century. Following the reformation in 1537, the economic base of the city fell away, and the city was repeatedly struck by fire.

Following the 1624 fire, King Christian IV ordered a new city plan, and changed the name of the city from Oslo to Christiania, in his own honor. A square city grid was introduced, and the first brick buildings were built. The city grew as an important port for lumber export, and the Bjørvika area east of the city developed with port facilities. By 1801, the city had 8900 residents.

From 1814, Christiania became the capital of Norway, which had regained partial independence from Denmark and entered a union with Sweden. Industrialization started in 1840, initially along the Aker River. The population grew rapidly, and new infrastructure was built. Commercial activities increased, and in 1854 the railway station was opened, connecting Christiania to Lake Mjøsa via the Hoved Line. In 1835, the population was 18,000; by 1890, it had reached 151,000. From 1878, the Oslofjord was kept permanently open with icebreakers. By 1900, Kristiania was the leading shipping city in the nation, and among the most important in the world.

In 1960, sales of cars exploded following the deregulation of sales. A new road system through Bjørvika was opened in 1970. Ten years later, the Oslo Tunnel connected the city's two railway networks together. Starting in the 1960s, containerization and automation became leading trends in the development of the port technology. The steady construction of new roads and port facilities created a physical and visual barrier that hindered Oslo from having access to the waterfront. European route E18 took up 1.8 kilometres (1.1 mi) of waterfront, until the Bjørvika Tunnel opened in May 2010.

Archaeological findings

Archaeologists discovered six medieval ships at least 500 years old in April 2019 in the modern Bjørvika district in connection with urban refinement and the construction of a high-speed railway. The ships date back the 1300s-1600s. The project manager and archaeologist of the Norwegian Maritime Museum, Elling Utvik Wammer, noted that the findings are unique in Norway and called them "an archaeological fairytale". The last ship found here in ten meters long is reportedly a cargo ship of the 16th century. Another archaeologist Marja-Liisa Grue supposes that it could be used to carry stones to nearby Akershus Fortress. The archaeologist team believe that the findings will light upon the great city fire of 1624 and the little-known period named Reformation in Norway history.

== Fjord City ==
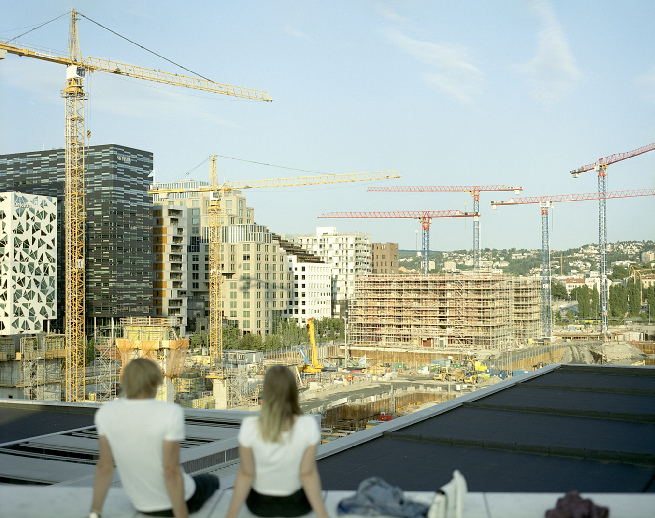
View of Bjørvika, August 2017, from the roof of the Oslo Opera House, Barcode Buildings on the left

Bjørvika is being redeveloped as part of the Fjord City plans for the Oslo waterfront. In 2010, the Bjørvika Tunnel was completed, and in 2012, Bispelokket and the rest of the remaining E18 was removed. A new avenue, Dronning Eufemias gate, is constructed along the current route of Bispegata. It will serve as a main route for public transport, and the Ekeberg Line of the Oslo Tramway is planned to be rerouted along the avenue in 2018/2019. The area is just south of Oslo Central Station, and can also be reached via the Oslo T-bane at Jernbanetorget.

HAV Eiendom, a subsidiary of the Oslo Port Authority, is responsible for developing the area. When finished, it will have 4–5,000 apartments and about 20,000 jobs. In addition, several major cultural institutions will be located in Bjørvika. It is estimated that 30,000 people will travel to the neighborhood each day.

In 2008, the Oslo Opera House opened at Bjørvika. Costing 3.3 billion kr and built by Statsbygg, it was designed by Snøhetta. Bjørvika was preferred as a location over Vestbanen. The opera is 38,500 square metres (414,000 sq ft) in size and has a large, slanting roof open to the public. In 2008, the Norwegian Parliament also decided to build the Munch Museum, the Stenersen Museum and the Oslo Public Library at Bjørvika to form a new cultural center.

Between Dronning Eufemias gate and the central station are twelve medium-rise buildings, up to 22 stories tall. These have officially been christened the Barcode Buildings. The first, the offices of PricewaterhouseCoopers, was completed in 2007. The last building was completed in 2016. The height of the buildings created a heated debate.

== Sports ==
Bjørvika SK is the local sports club established in 2009. They currently field a soccer team that plays in the Oslo Fotballkrets 8 division.

== Economy ==
The head office of Avinor is located in Bjørvika, on the sea side of Oslo Central Station.

== Gallery ==
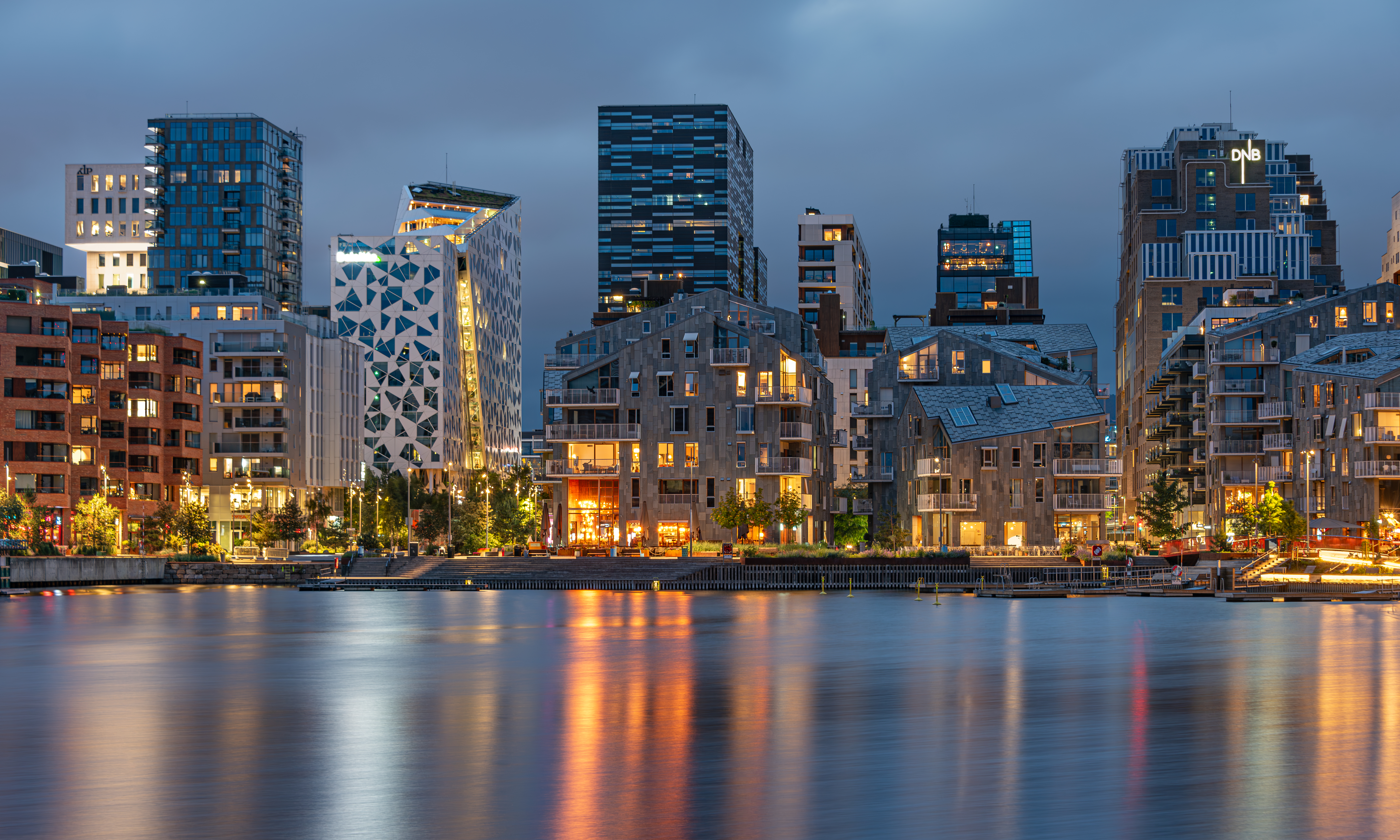
Night view of the Barcode buildings

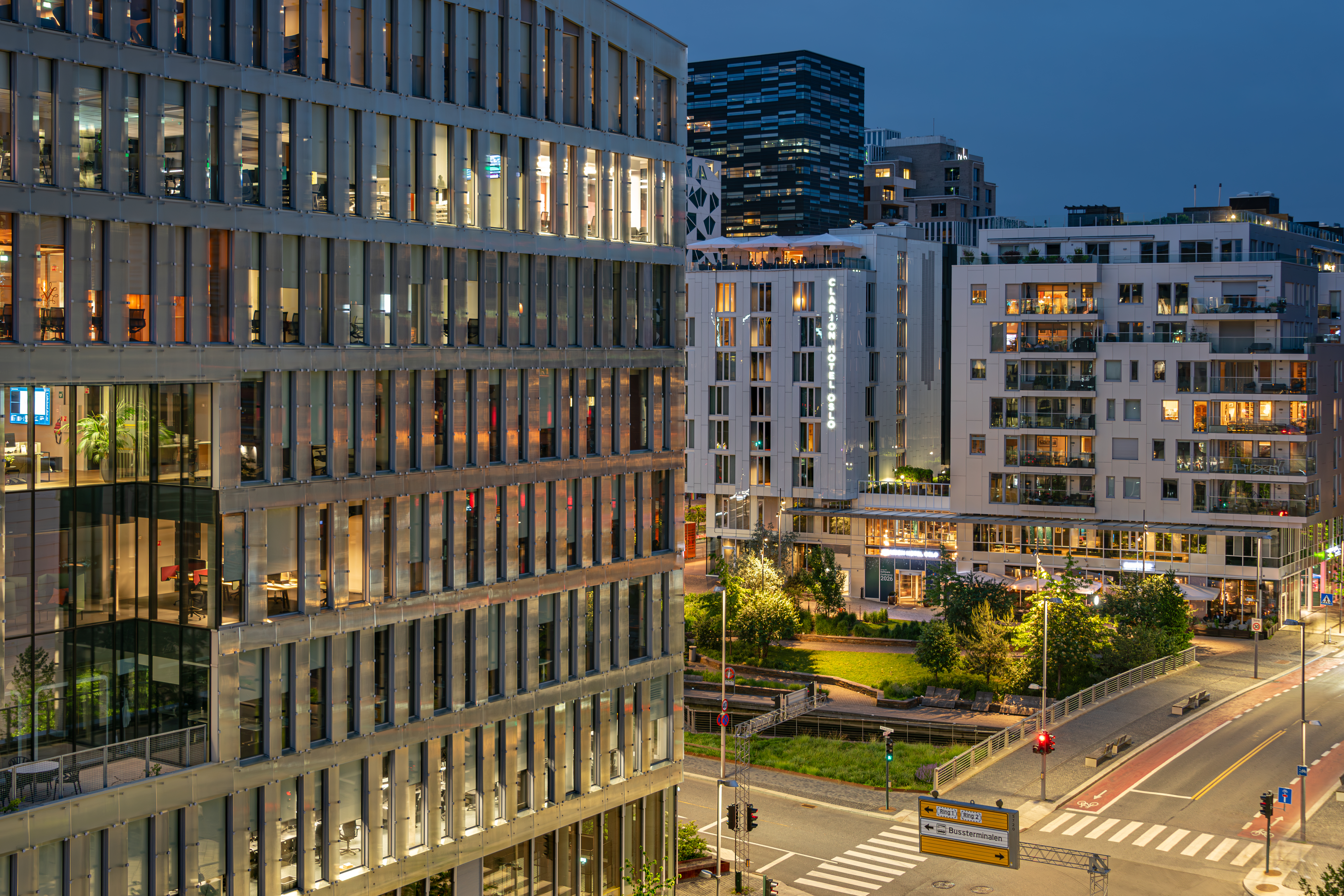

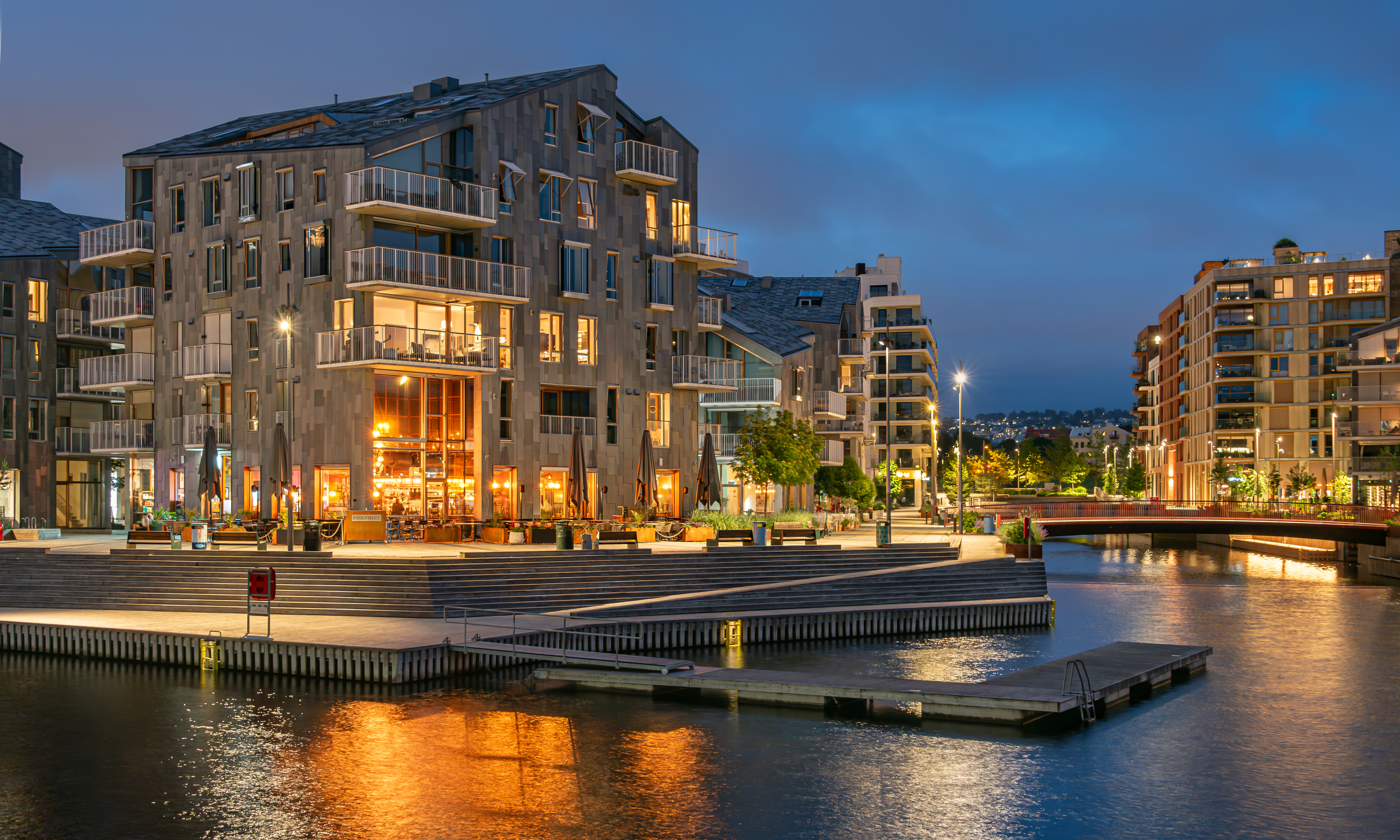

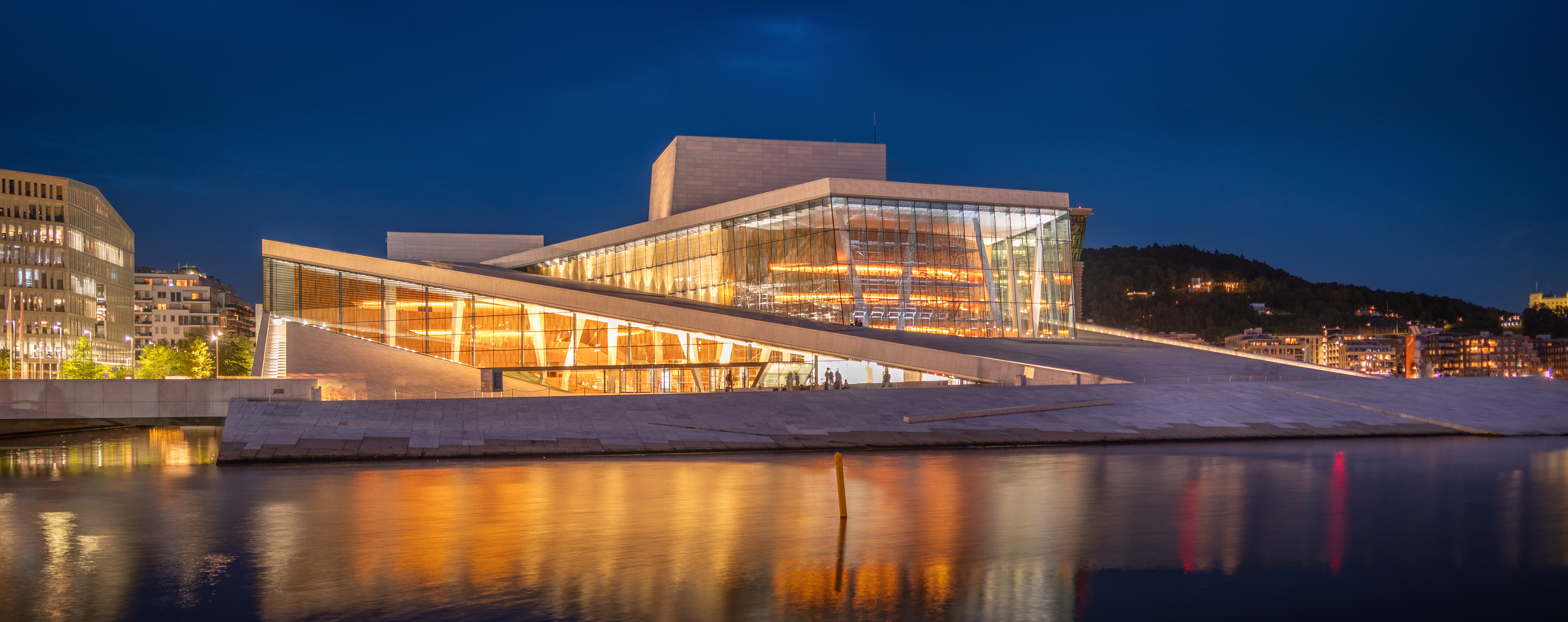
Oslo Opera House

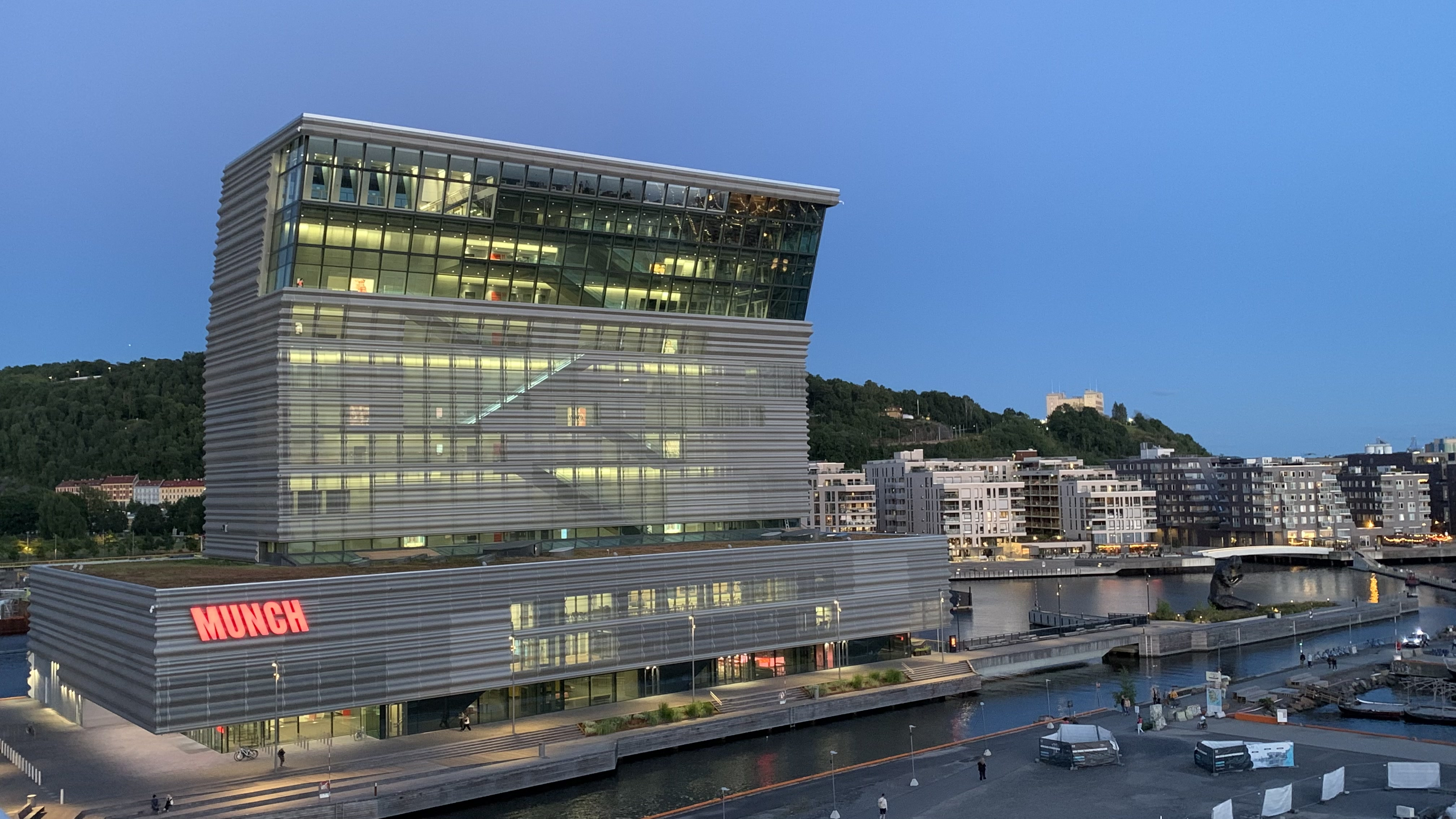
The Munch Museum in 2022

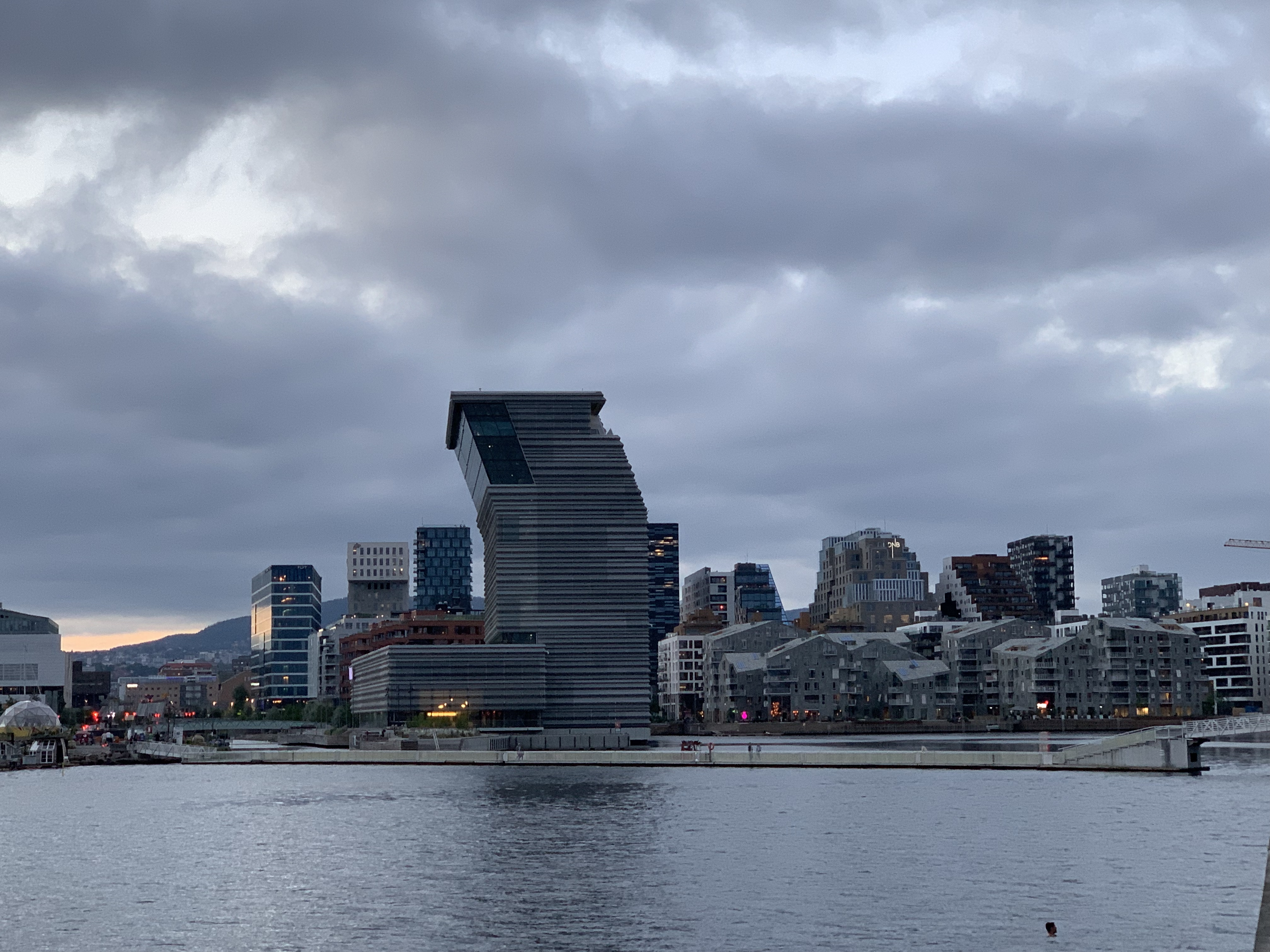
2021

== See also ==
- Bjørvika tram stop
- Bjørvika Tunnel
