= Posthuset (building) =

High-rise building in Oslo, Norway

Coordinates: 59°54′42.17″N 10°45′14.38″E

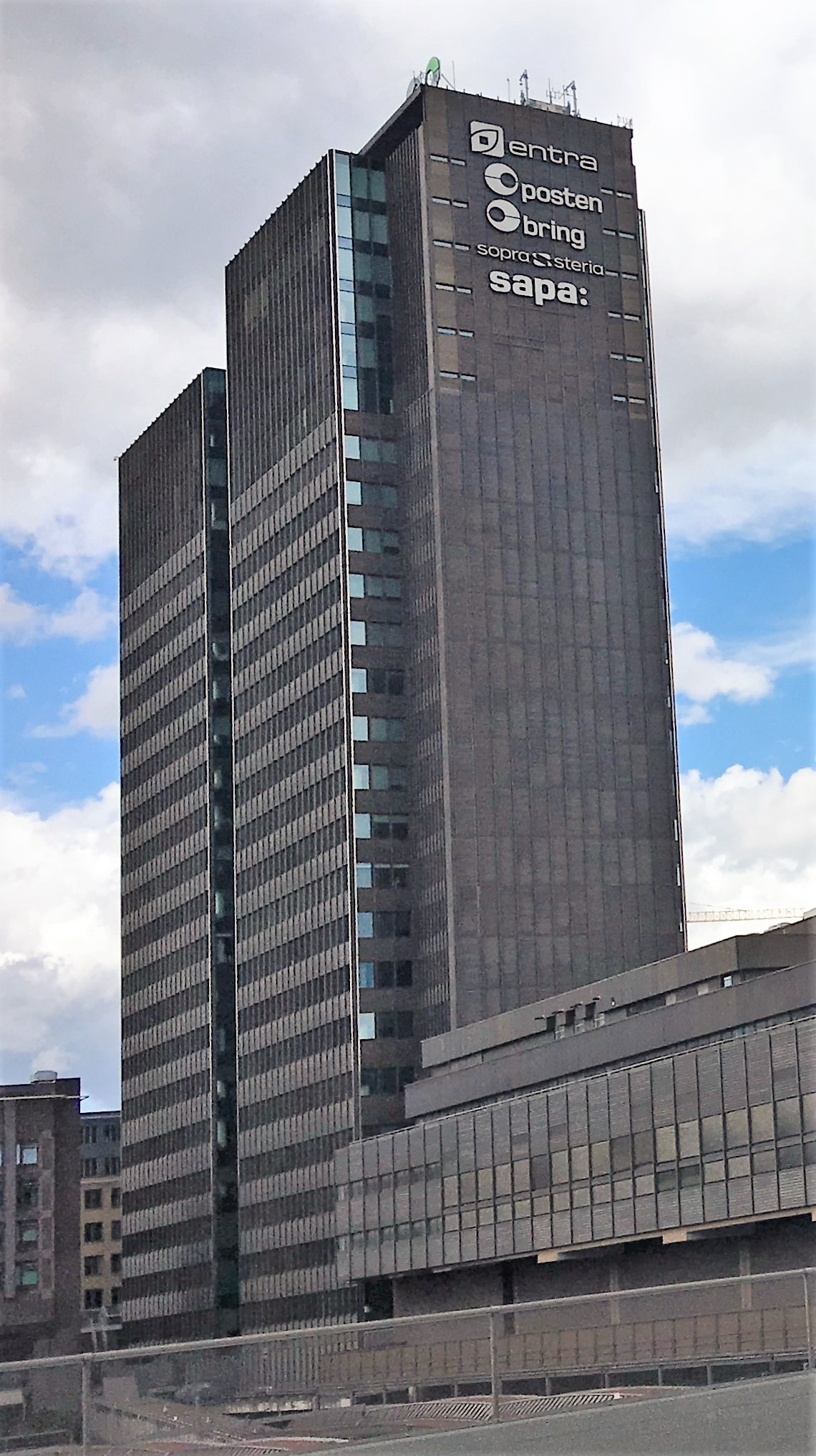
Postgirobygget in Oslo

Posthuset (known until 2000 as Postgirobygget) is a commercial building located at Biskop Gunnerus' gate 14 in the city center of Oslo, Norway.

The building was designed by Norwegian architect Rolf Christian Krognes and first constructed in 1975. It has 26 floors and at 111 meter in height, is the second tallest building in Oslo. In 2003, the building was thoroughly revamped: seven floors were added and the building was split in two towers. After the revamp, Aftenposten newspaper moved into the building.

Posthuset is the property of the Norwegian state-owned real estate company, Entra Eiendom AS. The building serves, among other things, as the home office for the Norwegian postal service, Posten Norge.
