= Entra =

Norwegian real estate company

Entra ASA
- Company type: Allmennaksjeselskap
- Traded as: OSE: ENTRA
- Industry: Real estate
- Headquarters: Norway
- Area served: Norway
- Key people: Sonja Horn (CEO); Erik Selin (chair)
- Revenue: ▲NOK 1,510 million (2011)
- Operating income: NOK 987 million (2011)
- Number of employees: 177 (2019)

Entra ASA is a Norwegian real estate company, headquartered in Oslo, Norway.

== Operations ==
The company was founded in 2000 when all commercial real estate owned by the state through Statsbygg was transferred to Entra. The company manages 1.2 million square meters in 128 buildings.

Entra's main purpose is to provide premises to meet central government needs and to operate on commercial principles. In addition, Entra is also able to serve municipal and private customers. Entra has about 175 employees and is based in Oslo.

== Management ==
Chief executive officer from 2008 to 2012 was Kyrre Olaf Johansen. In 2012 Rune Olsø was hired as acting chief executive, later on a permanent basis, but he resigned after a short time. Anne Harris became acting chief executive throughout the year.

Chief executive officer from January 2013 is Klaus-Anders Nysteen.
