= Oslo Opera House =

National opera theatre in Norway

Coordinates: 59°54′25″N 10°45′13″E

The Norwegian Opera and Ballet
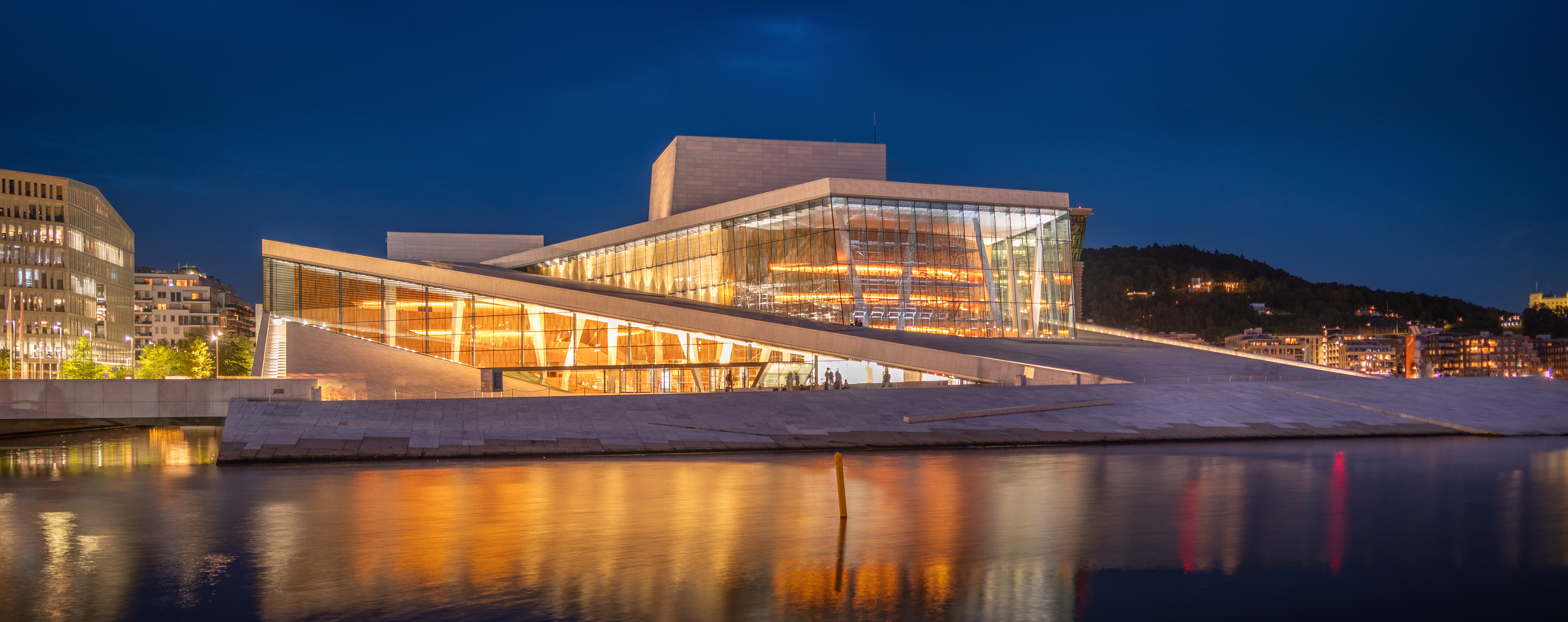

General information
- Type: The arts complex
- Architectural style: Contemporary
- Location: Oslo, Norway
- Completed: 2007
- Opened: 12 April 2008
- Client: Norwegian Directorate of Public Construction and Property
- Owner: Oslo Municipality

Technical details
- Structural system: Flat "iceberg" shape with inclined, white lines

Design and construction
- Architect: Snøhetta
- Awards: World Architecture Festival Cultural Award in 2008 and European Union Prize for Contemporary Architecture in 2009.

Website
- www.operaen.no

The Oslo Opera House (Norwegian: Operahuset) is the home of the Norwegian National Opera and Ballet, and the national opera house in Norway. The building is situated in the Bjørvika neighbourhood of central Oslo, at the head of the Oslofjord. It is operated by Norwegian Directorate of Public Construction and Property, the government agency which manages property for the Norwegian government. The structure contains 1,100 rooms in a total area of 49,000 m^{2} (530,000 sq ft). The main auditorium seats 1,364 and two other performance spaces can seat 200 and 400. The main stage is 16 m (52 ft) wide and 40 m (130 ft) deep. The angled exterior surfaces of the building are covered with marble from Carrara, Italy and white granite and make it appear to rise from the water. It is the largest cultural building constructed in Norway since Nidaros Cathedral was completed circa 1300.

== History ==
In 1999, after a long national debate, the Norwegian legislature decided to construct a new opera house in the city. A design competition was held and, of the 350 entries received, the judges chose that of the Norwegian architectural firm Snøhetta. Construction started in 2003 and was completed in 2007, ahead of schedule and 300 million NOK (~US$52 million) under its budget of 4.4 billion NOK (~US$760 million). The gala opening on 12 April 2008 was attended by His Majesty King Harald, Queen Margrethe II of Denmark and President Tarja Halonen of Finland and other leaders. During the first year of operation, 1.3 million people passed through the building's doors.

The Opera House won the culture award at the World Architecture Festival in Barcelona in October 2008 and the 2009 European Union Prize for Contemporary Architecture.

== The building ==
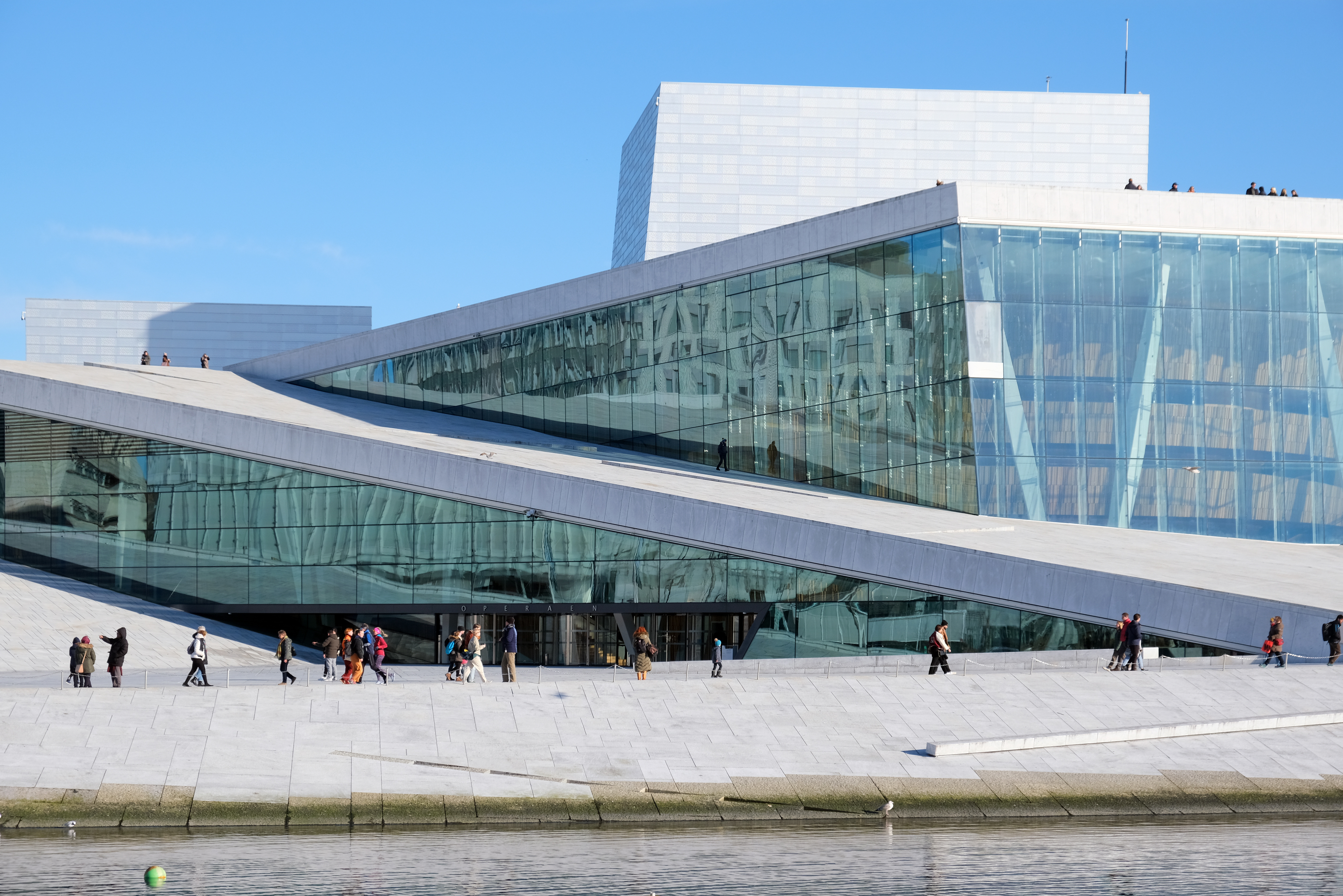
Exterior of Oslo Opera House

The roof of the building angles to ground level, creating a large plaza that invites pedestrians to walk up and enjoy the panoramic views of Oslo. While much of the building is covered in white granite and La Facciata, a white Italian carrara marble, the stage tower is clad in white aluminium, in a design by Løvaas & Wagle that evokes old weaving patterns.

The lobby is surrounded by 15 m (49 ft) tall windows with minimal framing and special glass that allows maximum views of the water. The roof is supported by thin angled columns also designed not to interfere with views.

Interior surfaces are covered in oak to bring warmth to spaces in contrast to the coolness of the white exterior. The main auditorium is a horseshoe shape and illuminated by an oval chandelier containing 5,800 handmade crystals. Seats include monitors for the electronic libretto system, allowing audiences to follow opera libretti in Norwegian and English in addition to the original language.

== Art ==
Several art projects were commissioned for the interior and exterior of the Opera House. The most notable is She Lies, a sculpture constructed of stainless steel and glass panels by Monica Bonvicini. It is permanently installed on a concrete platform in the fjord adjacent to Opera House and floats on the water moving in response to tides and wind to create an ever-changing face to viewers. The work was unveiled by Her Majesty Queen Sonja on 11 May 2010.

A perforated wall panel which covers roof supports in the lobby was designed by Olafur Eliasson. It features hexagonal opening and is illuminated from below and behind to create the illusion of melting ice. Other artists involved in the construction include Kristian Blystad, Jorunn Sannes and Kalle Grude, who designed the shape of the pavers on the forecourt and roof; Bodil Furu and Trine Lise Nedreaas, who created a film and video project; Marte Aas, Talleiv Taro Manum, Tom Sandberg, Gerd Tinglum and Nina Witoszek Fitzpatrick, who created the art book Site Seeing; and Linus Elmes and Ludvig Löfgren, who created the foundation stone.

The main stage curtain is the work of Pae White who designed it to look like crumpled aluminum foil. White scanned a crumpled piece of foil into a computer which translated the information to a loom that wove the curtain from wool, cotton and polyester to create a three-dimensional effect. The curtain was manufactured by the German-based theatrical equipment company Gerriets GmbH. The finished curtain measures 74 ft (23 m) wide and 36 ft (11 m) and weighs 1,100 lb (500 kg).

== Gallery ==
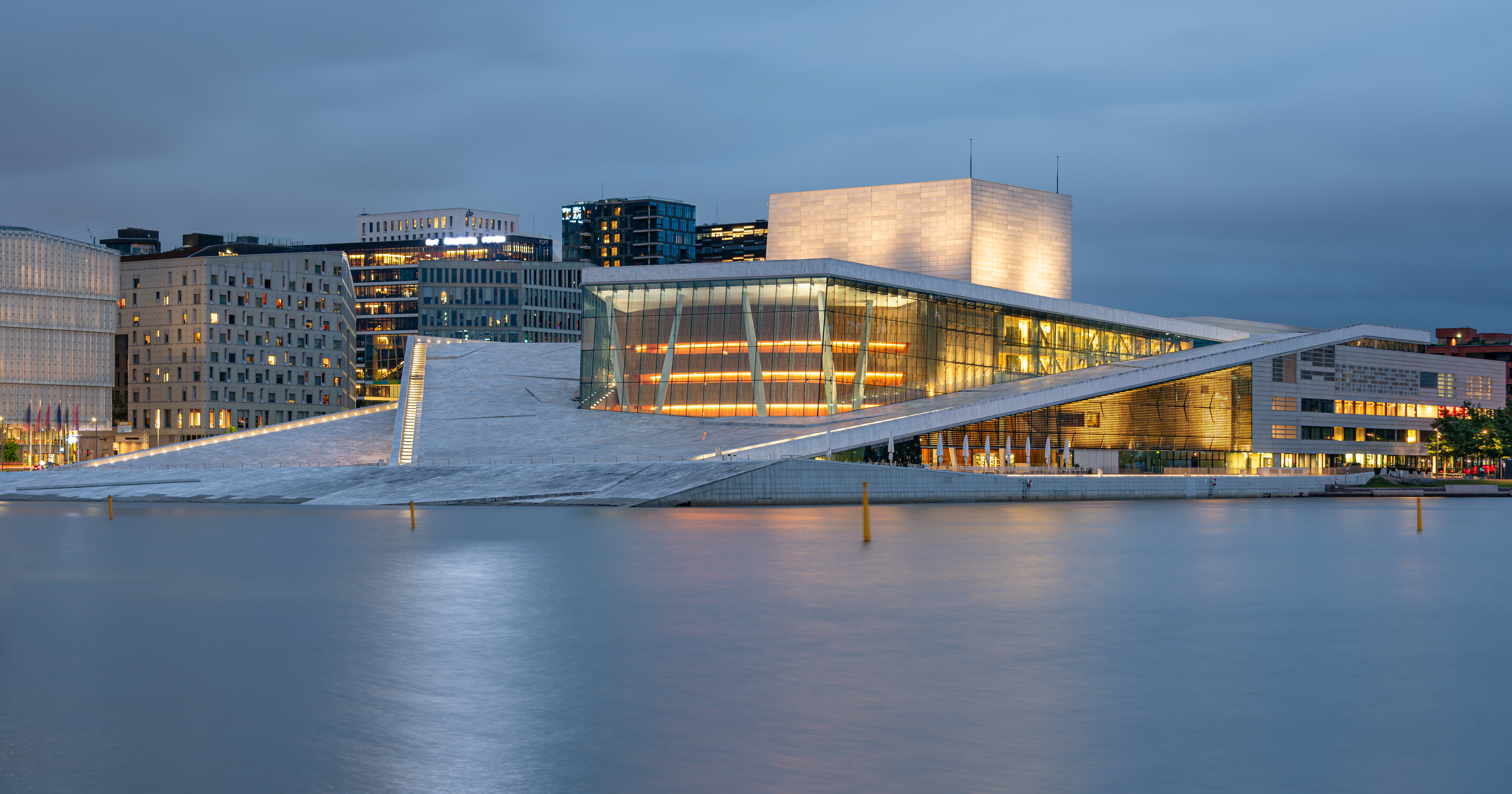

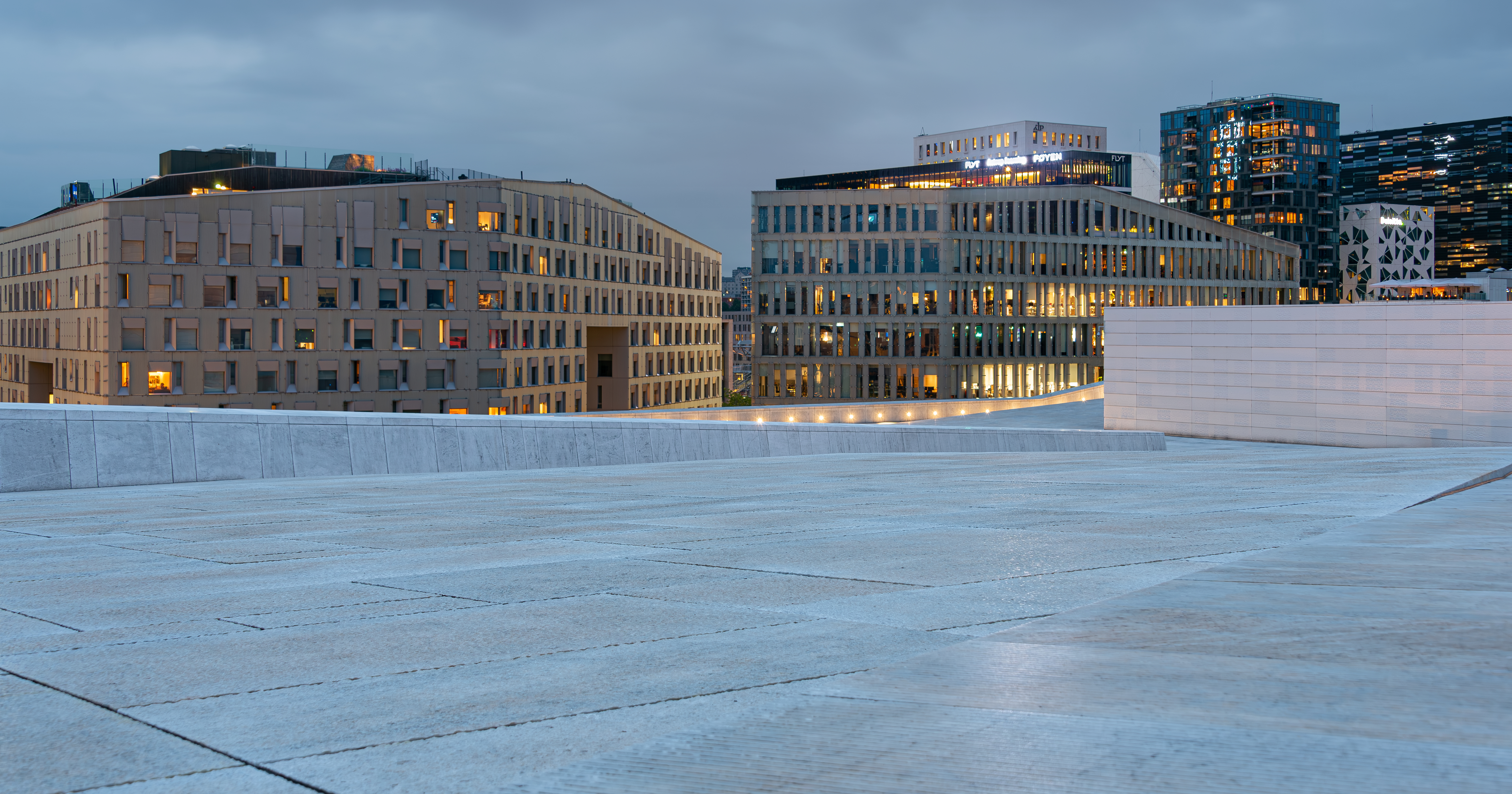

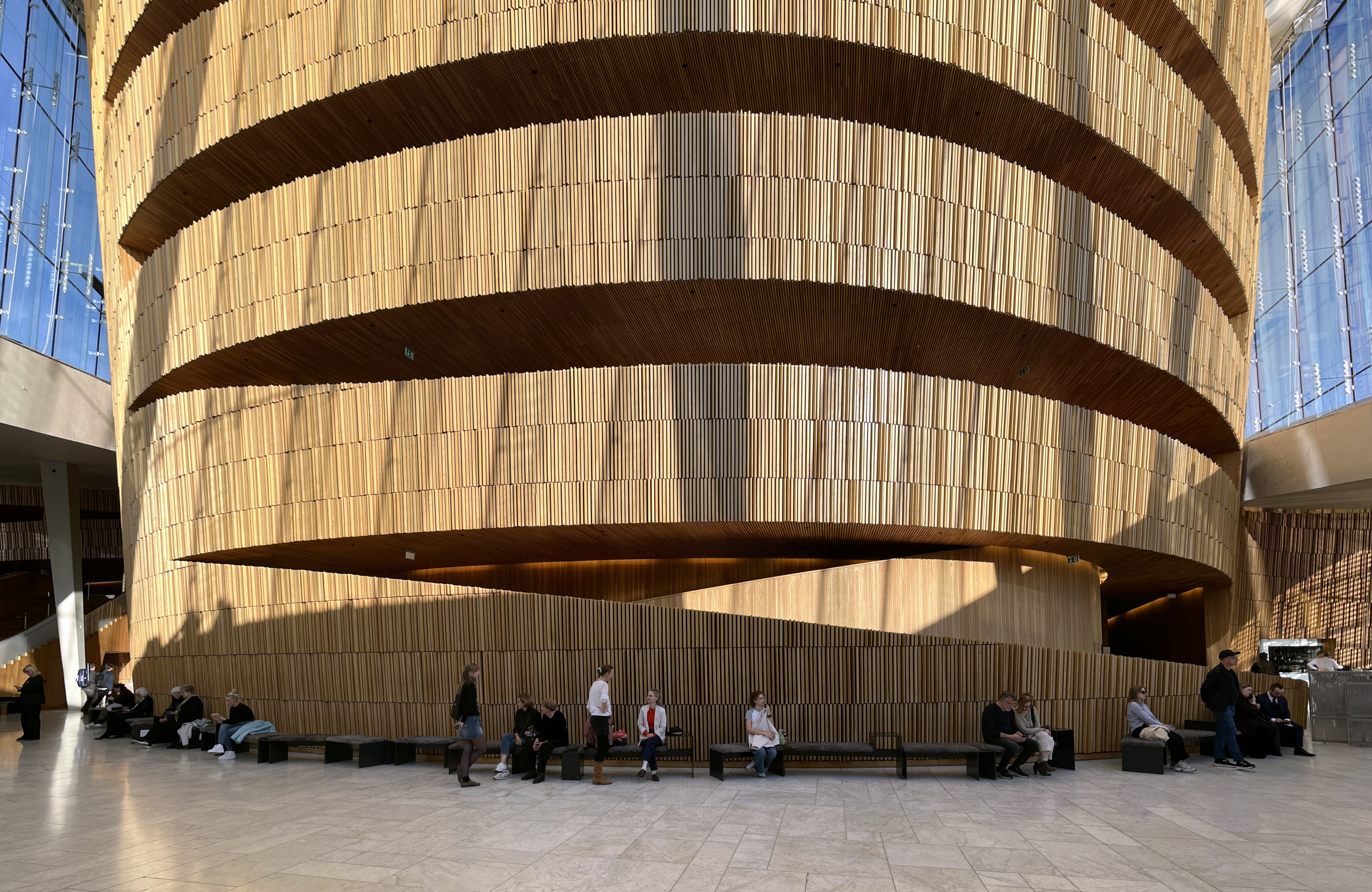
The lobby

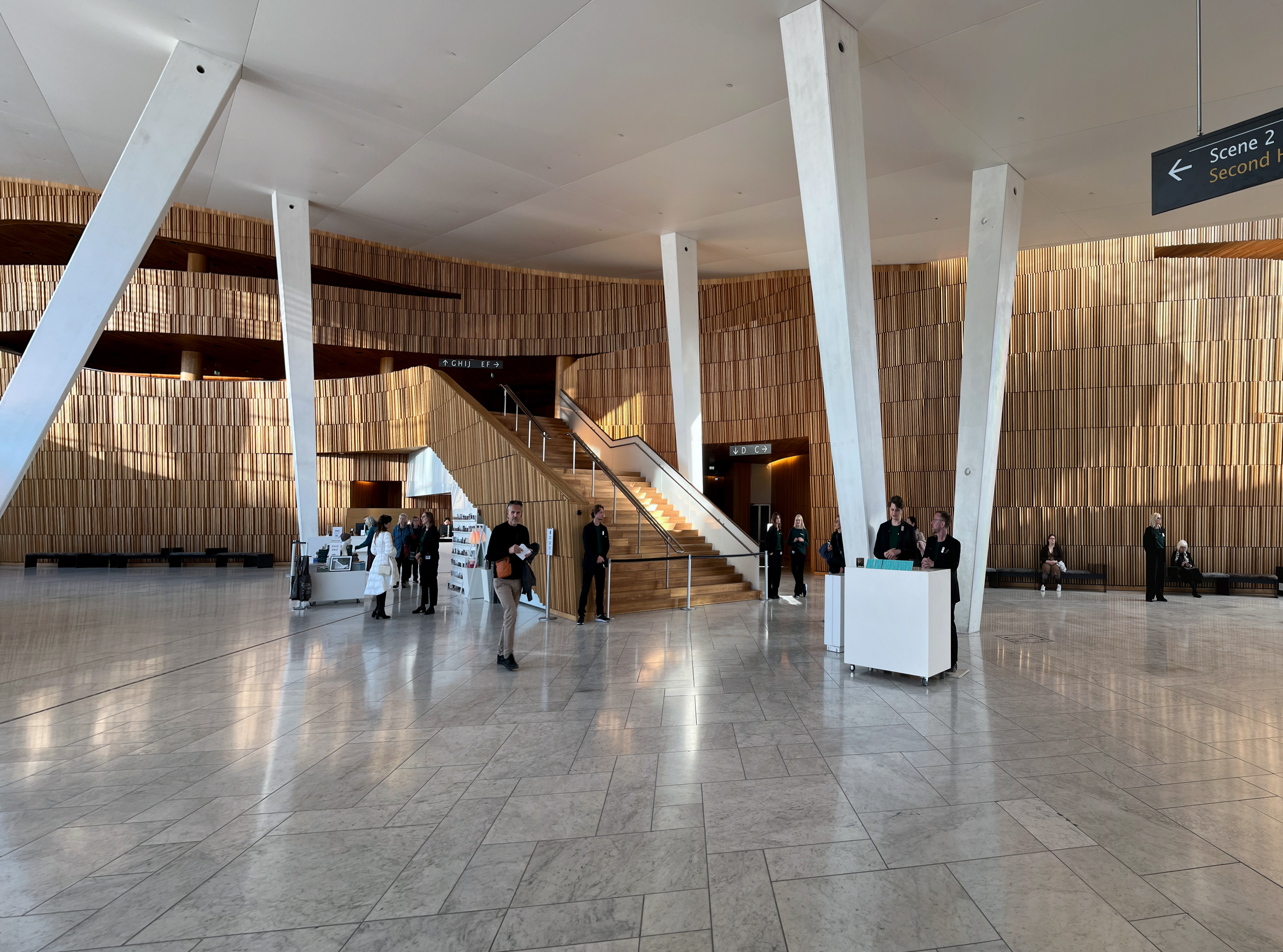

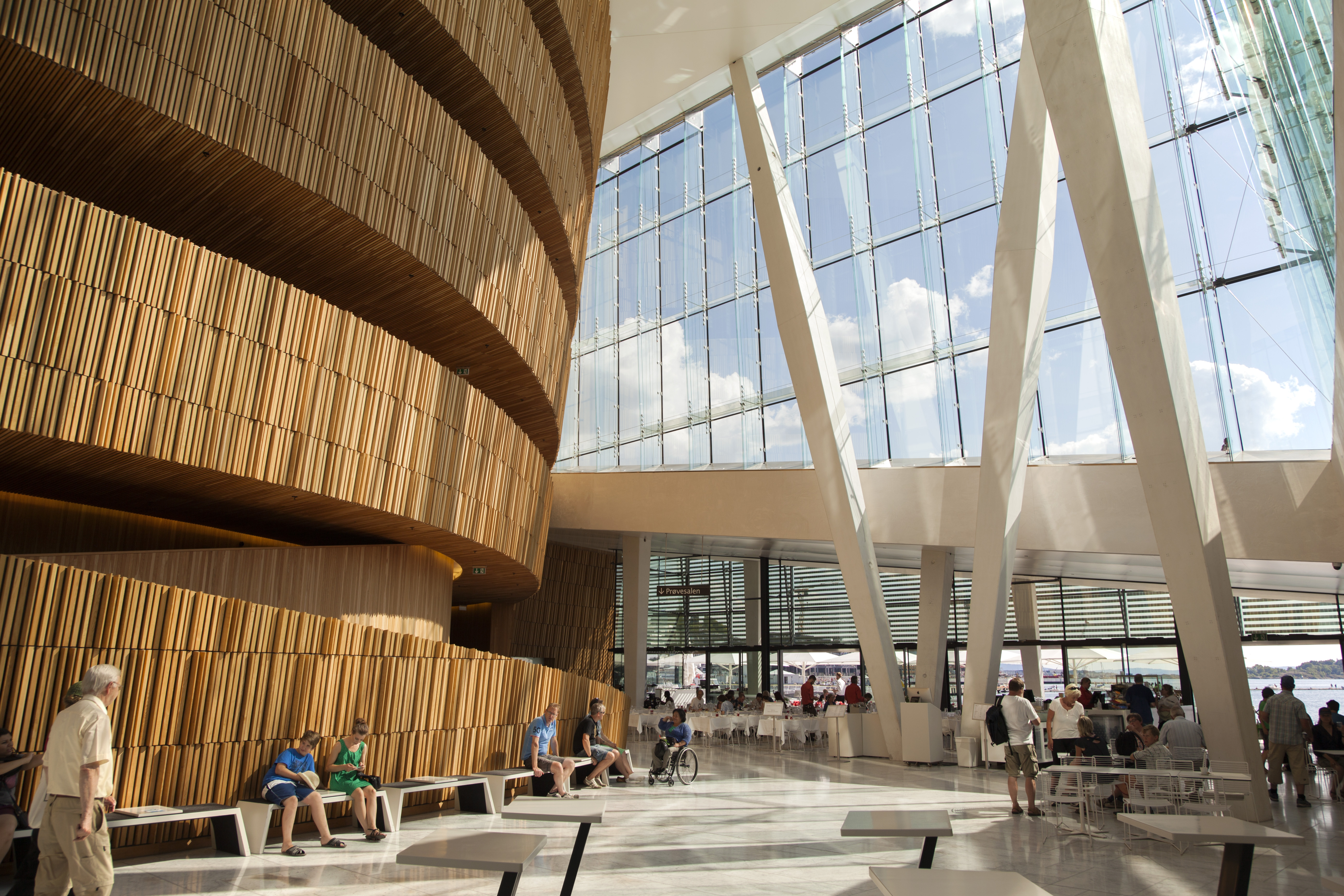

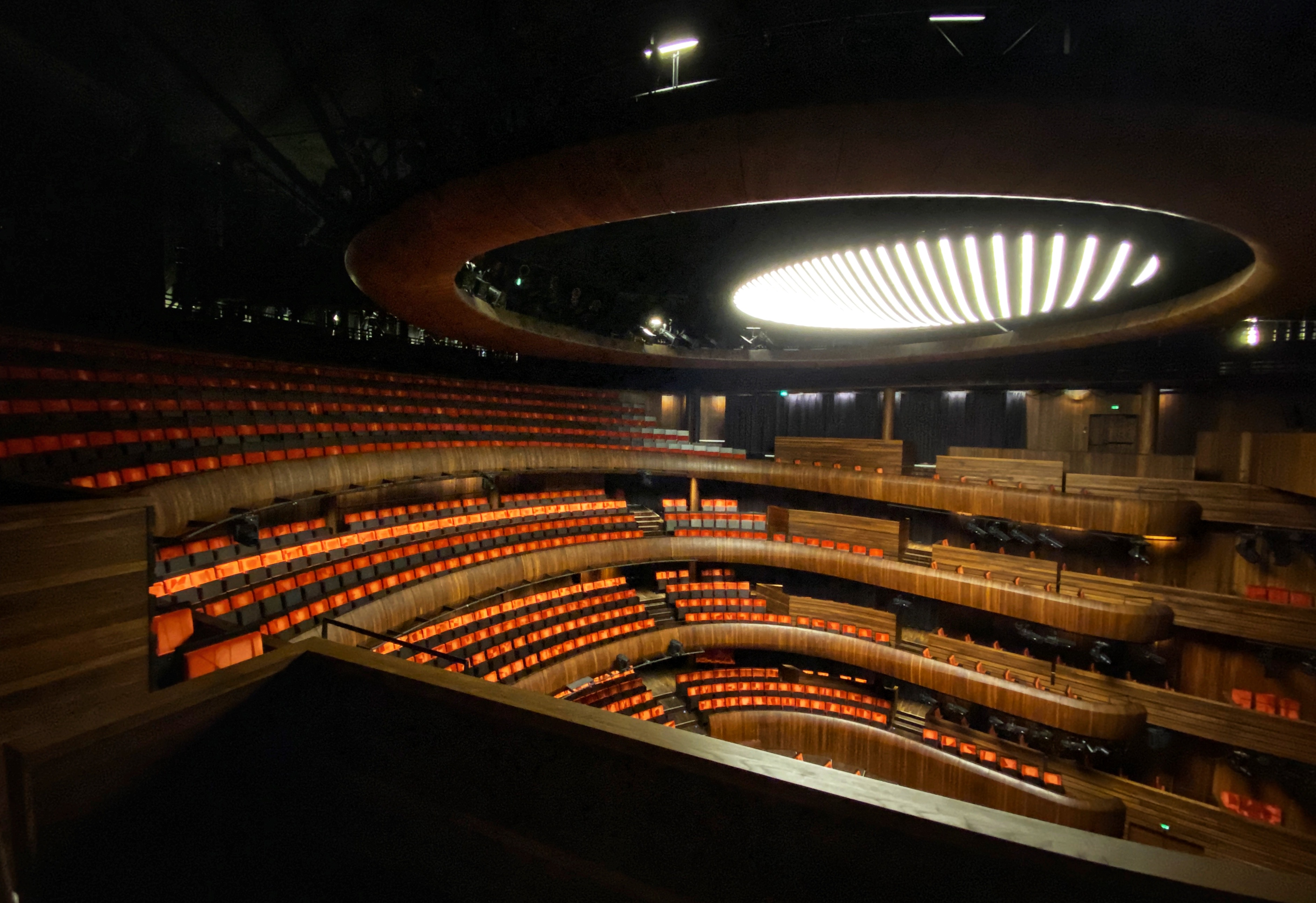
The main stage hall seen from the balcony. Walls, floors and balcony fronts are made of oak

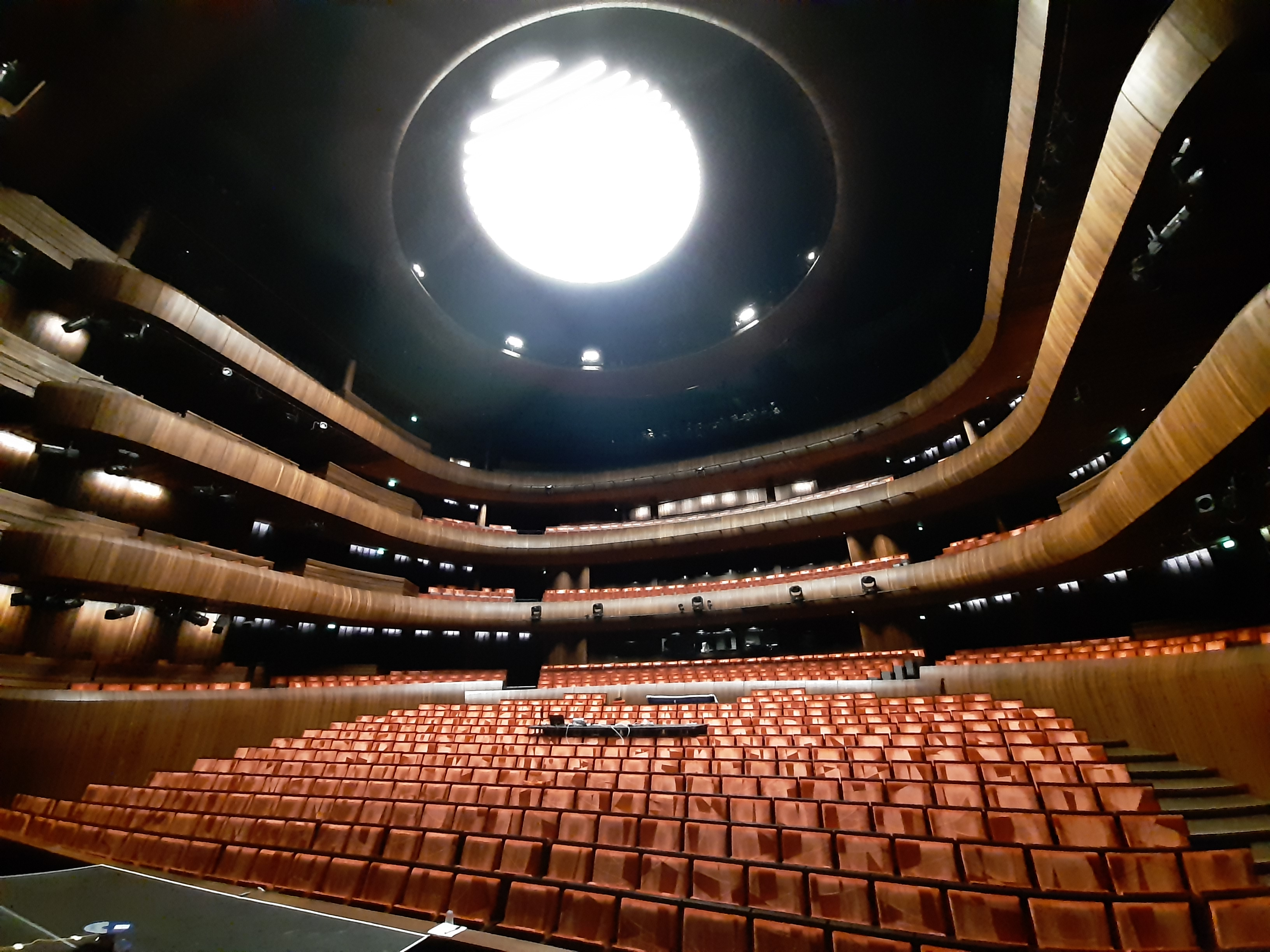

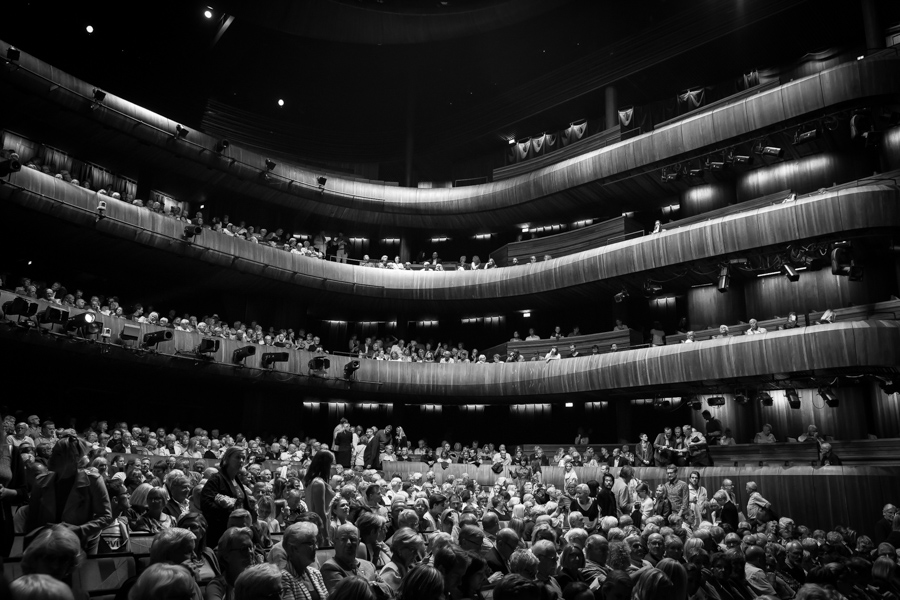

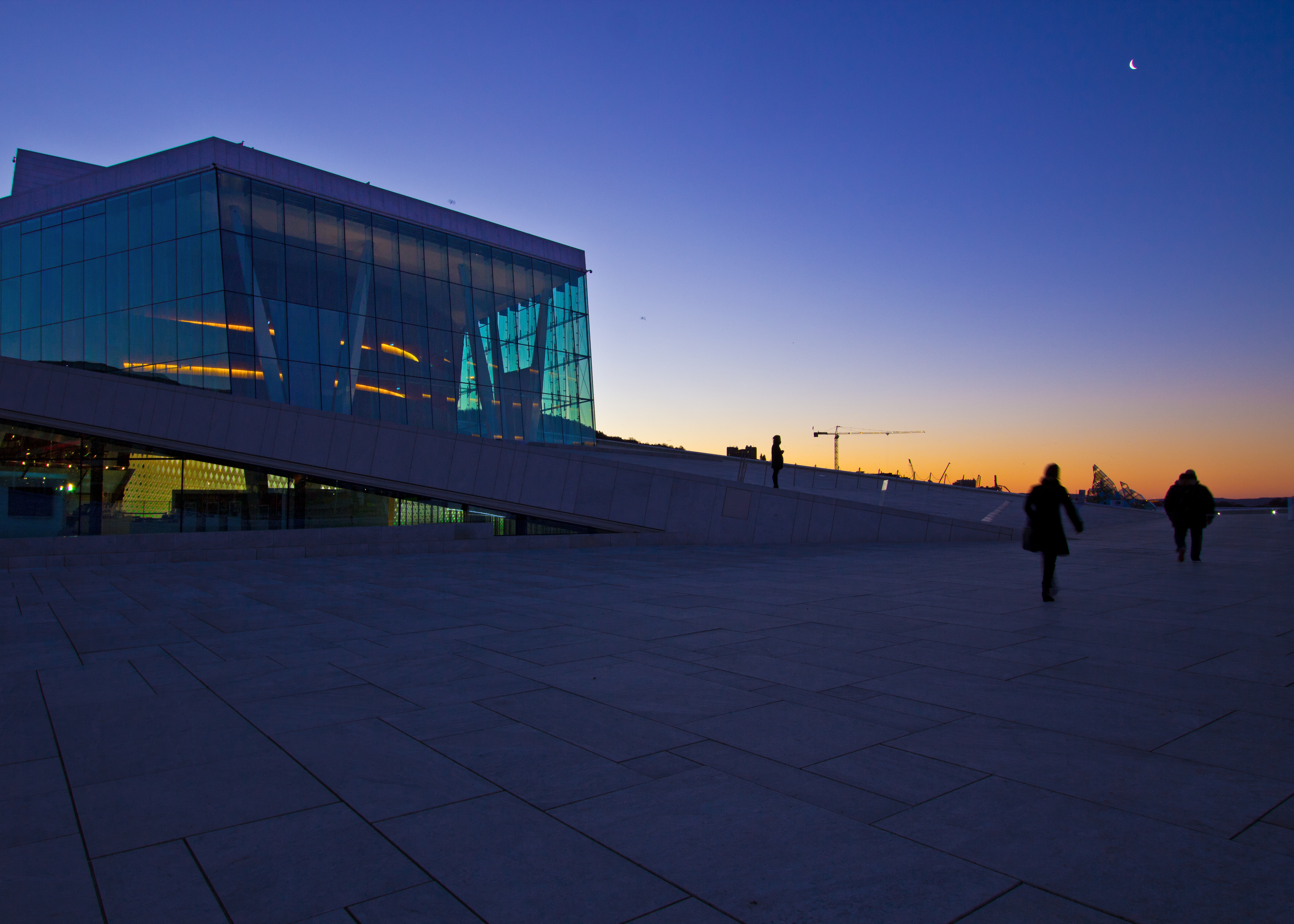
An early morning in November 2013

360° panorama of main auditorium
