= Norwegian Directorate of Public Construction and Property =

- Statsbygg

Agency overview
- Formed: 1816
- Jurisdiction: Government of Norway
- Headquarters: Oslo
- Employees: 860
- Annual budget: NOK 2,570 million (2006)
- Agency executive: Harald Vaagaasar Nikolaisen
- Parent agency: Ministry of Local Government and Regional Development
- Website: www.statsbygg.no

The Norwegian Directorate of Public Construction and Property (Norwegian: Statsbygg) is a Norwegian government agency that manages central parts of the real estate portfolio of the Government of Norway.

== Operation ==
The Norwegian Directorate of Public Construction and Property provides construction and property management services on behalf of the Norwegian Government. This includes 2.7 million square meters in 2,350 buildings, of which 115 are located abroad. The portfolio includes office buildings, heritage sites, campuses, operational facilities, and other buildings. The directorate also manages the Global Seed Vault in Svalbard. The agency has at any time about 200 construction projects under way, completing about 10 to 20 new structures each year. The directorate has 860 employees. The head office is situated on Bishop Gunnerus Street (Biskop Gunnerus' gate) in Oslo. There are regional offices in Porsgrunn, Bergen, Trondheim, and Tromsø.

Some parts of the public real estate are managed by other agencies, including railways, the military, and healthcare facilities. Part of the government portfolio, which is subject to competition, is managed by the limited company Entra Eiendom, which was demerged from the Norwegian Directorate of Public Construction and Property in 2000. The directorate is subordinate to the Ministry of Local Government and Regional Development (Kommunal- og distriktsdepartementet).

== History ==
The agency dates back to 1816, when King Charles II appointed Christian Ancher Collett as a consultant to manage the royal buildings around Christiania. In 1886 the agency was created by law as Statens bygnignsinspektorat (The state building inspectorate), later changing its name to Riksarkitekten. In 1959 the agency was reorganized as Statens bygge- og eiendomsdirektorat and from 1993 as Statsbygg. Since 1991 the directorate has had to compete with private companies to secure rental agreements with public institutions.
