= Rådhusplassen =

Square in Oslo, Norway

Coordinates: 59.9109°N 10.7326°E

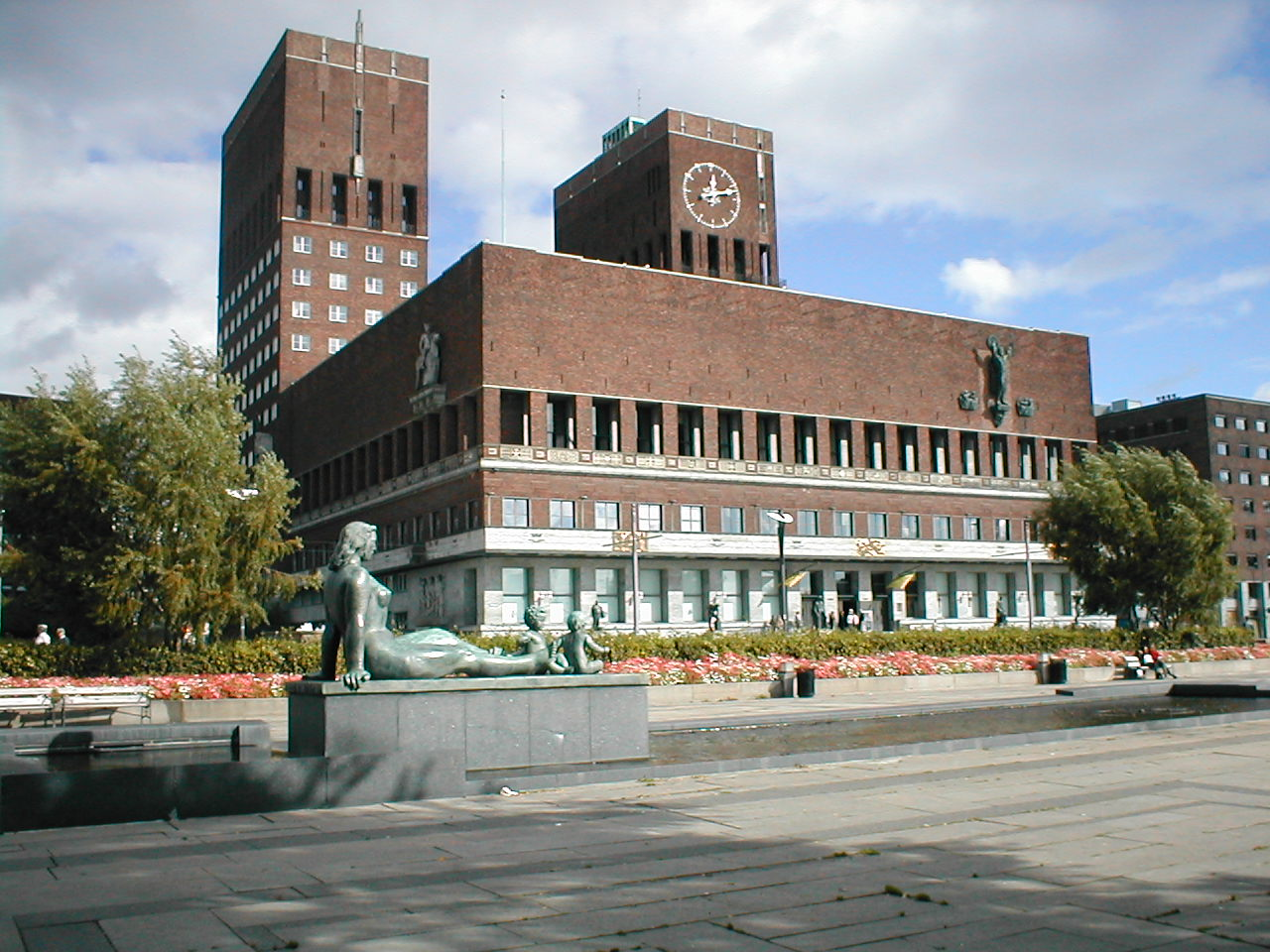
Part of the square in front of Oslo City Hall.

Rådhusplassen ("The City Hall Square") is a square located between Oslo City Hall and the Oslofjord in Vika, Oslo, Norway. Previously used as a road and part of European route E18, it has since 1994 served as a recreational area. North of the square stands the city hall, to the south the fjord, to the east Akershus Fortress and to the east the former Western Railway Station.

== History ==
Up until the 1920s, the area of Pipervika was dominated by common housing, and was seen by the contemporary elite as an area with low housing standard, poor hygiene and lack of moral standards. Plans for the new city hall started in 1915, and in 1921 the Parliament of Norway passed legislation allowing expropriation of parts of Pipervika to build a city hall and a square. An architectural competition announced in 1916 was won by the architects Arnstein Arneberg and Magnus Poulsson. Their plan involved paving the square with granite, and making it an urban open space, instead of a park.

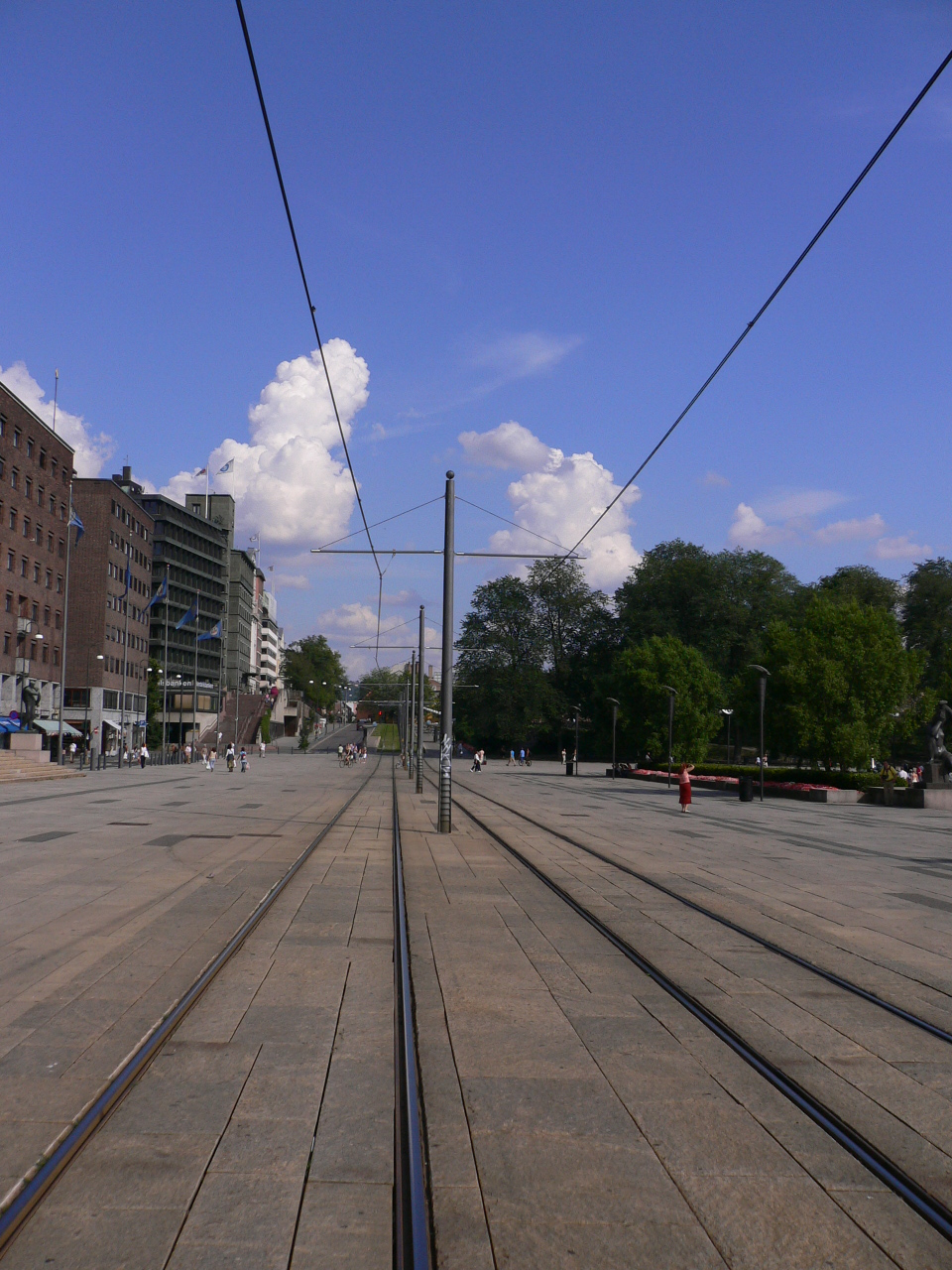
The Vika Line crosses Rådhusplassen.

Construction of the city hall, given the street address Rådhusplassen 1, started in 1931, and the square was named in 1934. In 1938, a competition for decoration of the area was launched, and won by Emil Lie and Per Hurum. They had made a design of classic sculptures and decorations, that would contrast with the modernistic building. The work started in 1941, but was not completed until 1960.

== Highway and tunnel ==
Since 10 October 1875, the square had been part of the Vestbanen Line of the Oslo Tramway. It remained until 1961. Also the Oslo Port Line opened on 13 November 1907. The square ended up as a six-lane highway that functioned as the main east–west road through Oslo, and was part of European Route E18. With the opening of the Oslo Tunnel that connected Oslo Central Station to the Drammen Line, the Port Line became redundant, and was removed in 1983. The idea to put the highway in a tunnel under the square was launched in the 1950s, and during the 1980s it was decided to build the Festning Tunnel. The city council voted on 5 April 1989 to make the square car-free. The car tunnel opened in 1990, but still 24,000 cars remained each day on the four-lane road.

During the summer of 1994, the square was made a car-free zone, and on 21 August 1995, the Vika Line opened. At Rådhusplassen is a tram stop with the name Rådhusplassen. It is served by tram line 12. Also at Rådhusplassen is the ferry quay used by Oslo Fergene for route 91 to Bygdøy.
