= Festning Tunnel =

Road tunnel in Oslo, Norway

- Interactive map of Festning Tunnel

Overview
- Line: European Route E18
- Location: Oslo, Norway
- Coordinates: 59.91°N 10.73°E
- Start: Bjørvika
- End: Filipstad

Operation
- Opened: 1990
- Owner: Norwegian Public Roads Administration

Technical
- Length: 1,800 m (5,900 ft)
- No. of lanes: 6
- Min elevation: −45 m (−148 ft)

The Festning Tunnel (Norwegian: Festningstunnelen) is a motorway tunnel on European Route E18 in the city center of Oslo, Norway. The tunnel has two tubes, with three lanes in each. It runs from Bjørvika, under Akershus Fortress, The City Hall Square and Vika to Filipstad. The tunnel is 1,800 metres (5,900 ft) and −45 m (−148 ft) elevation at the deepest.

The tunnel was previously also known as the Mountain Line (Fjellinjen) and the Oslo Tunnel (Oslotunnelen). The name Fjellinjen was since taken over by the company responsible for charging toll fees on the urban toll ring in Oslo. The tunnel changed its official name from the Oslo Tunnel to the Festning Tunnel in 1998 to avoid confusion with the railway tunnel with the same name. In 2008 and 2009, the electrical installation in the tunnel is being upgraded, financed through toll fees, costing 240 million kr.

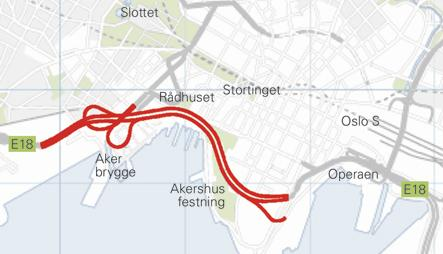
Map of the tunnel

In the west, the tunnel connects to Dronning Mauds gate with a cloverleaf intersection, and also has the intersection prepared for a future Slottspark Tunnel. In the east, it connects to Nylandsveien and Ring 1 at Bjørvika. In 2012, the Bjørvika Tunnel will be constructed below Bjørvika, and the new tunnel will connect directly with the Festning Tunnel.

The tunnel was built to remove traffic from The City Hall Square, the square in front of the Oslo City Hall, and allow better access to the waterfront from the city. After the tunnel opened in January 1990, cars remained on The City Hall Square until 1994. In 1995, the Vika Line of the Oslo Tramway was built across the square.
