= Opera Tunnel =

Tunnel system in Oslo, Norway

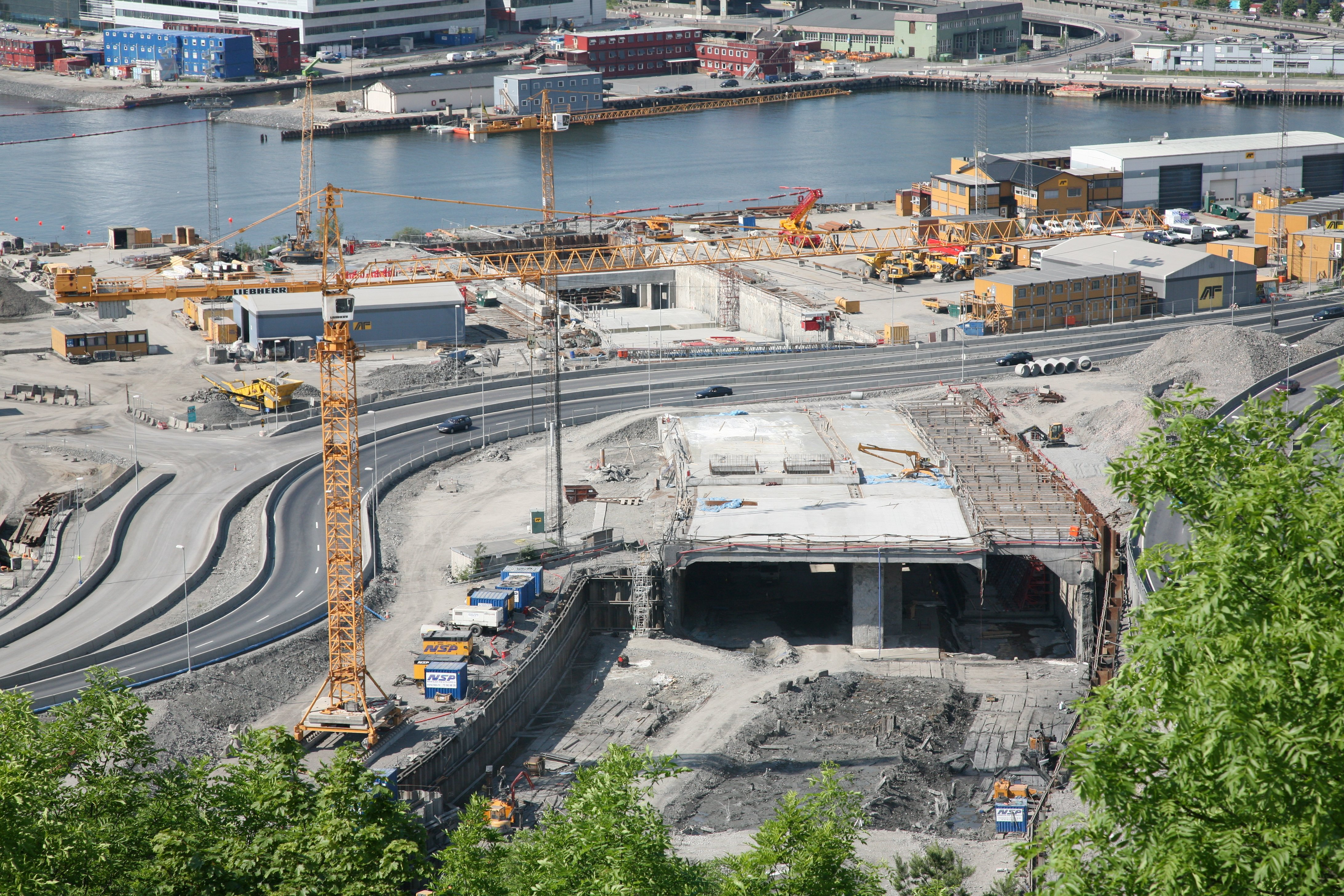
- Construction of the Bjørvika Tunnel in 2007; Credit: Hans A. Rosbach

Overview
- Location: Oslo, Norway
- Coordinates: 59.9056°N 10.7531°E
- Route: European route E6 and European route E18: Bjørvika Tunnel; Festning Tunnel; Ekeberg Tunnel; Svartdal Tunnel

Operation
- Opened: 20 September 2010

Technical
- Length: 5,767 metres (3.58 mi)

The Opera Tunnel (Norwegian: Operatunnelen) is a motorway tunnel system under Oslo city center between Filipstad in the west and Ryen in the east. The tunnel consists of four parts built at different times. From west to east are the Festning Tunnel and Bjørvika Tunnel, which are part of European route E18, and the Ekeberg Tunnel and Svartdal Tunnel, which make up a branch of European Route E6. Between the Bjørvika Tunnel and Ekeberg Tunnel is a 111-metre (364 ft) long stretch in the open. The signposted length is 5,767 m (3.58 mi) and the tunnels have a combined length of 15,938 m (9.903 mi).

== Opening of the tunnel ==
The tunnel was opened on 20 September 2010 when the Bjørvika Tunnel was opened and all of the tunnels were combined into the Opera Tunnel complex.

- Festning Tunnel opened in 1990.
- Ekeberg Tunnel opened in 1995.
- Svartdal Tunnel opened in 2000.
- Bjørvika Tunnel/the Opera Tunnel were officially opened by King Harald V 17 September 2010.

The name Opera Tunnel was chosen by a poll of the readers of the newspaper Aften.
