= Elisenberg station =

Railway station in Frogner, Norway

Coordinates: 59°55′7.22″N 10°42′27.86″E

Elisenberg

General information
- Location: Balchens gate Elisenberg, Frogner, Oslo; Norway
- Owner: Bane NOR
- Line: Drammen Line
- Platforms: 2

Construction
- Structure type: Underground
- Depth: approx. 30 metres (98 ft)

Other information
- Status: Never opened

History
- Opened: Never
Location

Elisenberg station (Norwegian: Elisenberg stasjon) is an unfinished railway station within the Oslo Tunnel on the Drammen Line in Oslo, Norway. The ghost station was partially built during the construction of the tunnel between 1971 and 1980, but has never been put into use. It is located between Nationaltheatret Station and Skøyen Station, at Elisenberg in Frogner. A 220-meter (720 ft) long center platform and part of the access way has been built, but never completed. While the station initially was not put into use because of lack of funds to complete it, it is now unlikely that it will ever be completed, as the need for a station has disappeared and an opening would need a large investment of funds.

== Facilities ==
Elisenberg is located approximately halfway between Nationaltheatret Station and Skøyen Station in the Oslo Tunnel of the Drammen Line. It is located under Balchens gate, near the tram stop with the same name. All that has been built at Elisenberg Station is the centre platform, which is 220 meters (720 ft) long and 11 meters (36 ft) wide, and a passageway across the south track. The tracks lay 30 meters (98 ft) below the surface.

The plans called for a two-track station which would be connected to the surface via elevators. At ground level, there would have been a vestibule with traveller facilities and ticket sales. The main entrance was to be from Balchensgate, with a secondary entrance from the street junction Elisenbergveien–Frognerveien.

== History ==
Planning of the Oslo Tunnel was officially initiated in 1938, as a way to connect the Drammen Line to Oslo East Station (Oslo Ø, now Oslo Central Station, Oslo S). The Station Committee of 1938, led by Axel Grenholm, recommended a route that would branch off from the existing line close to the then terminal station of Oslo West Station (Oslo V). Another committee, led by Oddvar Halvorsen, was established in 1960 to look at the matter again. It stated that the tunnel should be longer and intersect with the Drammen Line at a point between Skarpsno and Skøyen, and with a second station built at Frogner. The proposal was presented to Parliament on 4 November 1961, along with several other matters related to rail transport investments. Construction of the Oslo Tunnel and Elisenberg Station was passed unanimously.

A planning office was established in 1962, initially led by Erik Himle. The final plans for the route were passed by parliament in 1968, and construction started in 1971. The rationale for the building of the station was that Frogner was to be developed as a dense, commercial district. However, to cut costs with the Oslo Tunnel, it was decided that parts of Nationaltheatret would not be built yet, and that Elisenberg Station would not open until after the tunnel was completed. By 1978, the platform area had been built, but the access way had not. The investments cost 30 million Norwegian krone (NOK), 75 mill. of 1998 standard. The Oslo Tunnel opened, without Elisenberg Station, on 1 June 1980.

"I did not know there was a station here. But it does not seem wise to leave it unused, there has after all been put a lot of capital into it already."

— Sissel Rønbeck, former Minister of Transport, then member of Parliament in Aftenposten, 22 November 1989

During the mid-1980s, the plans for Elisenberg were again considered, after an initiative by Prime Minister Kåre Willoch who had been stuck in traffic congestion at Frogner. At the time, the cost estimate to open the station was NOK 105 million. The rail administration planned instead to build an additional, western entrance to Nationaltheatret Station, located near the roundabout between Parkveien and Henrik Ibsens gate (then Drammensveien), which would only cost 40 million NOK.

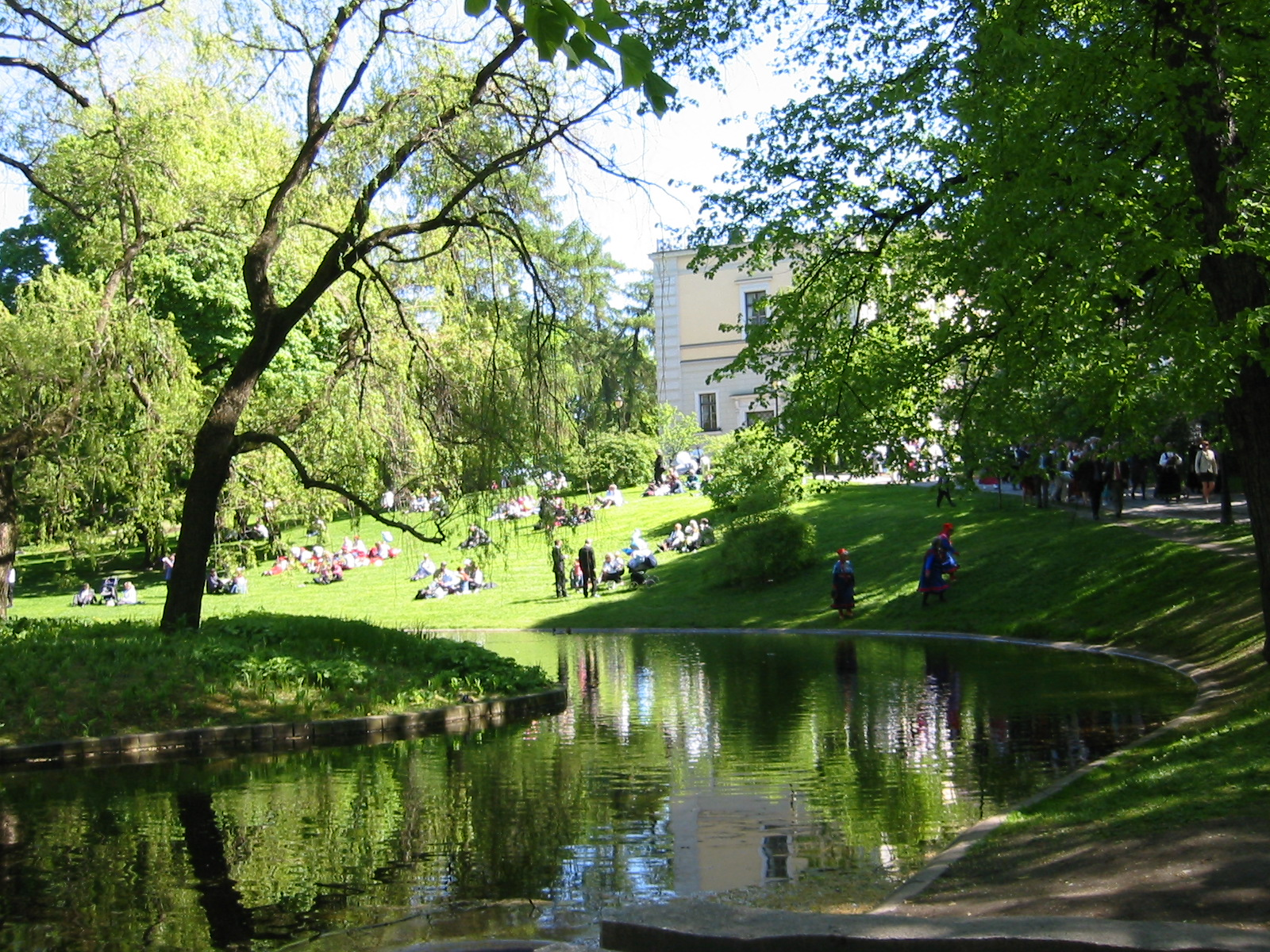
Many feared that the south-western corner of the Palace Park, named Queen's Park, would vanish

This entrance was expected to replace the need for Elisenberg Station, and was located in the middle of the Oslo Tunnel, between Nationaltheatret and Skøyen. Oslo Byes Vel and the Conservative, Red and Centre parties opposed the construction of the entrance, arguing that it would ruin the south-western corner of the Palace Park. The Conservative Party proposed building it further south, across Henrik Ibsens gate, either in Hansteens gate or in Parkveien near Oslo Commerce School, while the others wanted to open Elisenberg Station for traffic.

However, by then it had become clear that Frogner west of Solli plass would remain dominantly a residential area. The estimates showed that the station would capture few new riders and instead simply give a shorter walk for a small minority of those who used Nationaltheatret Station and Skøyen Station. With the upgraded Nationaltheatret Station, which opened in 1999, the capacity of the Oslo Tunnel increased from 16 to 24 trains per hour in each direction, because the station from then had four, rather than two, tracks. A similar upgrade would need to be done for Elisenberg Station, should it be taken into use, or the capacity of the tunnel would again be reduced. It is therefore highly unlikely that the station will ever be opened. In 1998, the readers of the Norwegian newspaper Aftenposten proposed making Elisenberg an emergency exit.

In 2008, one hundred million NOK were given from the state budget of Norway to make improvements to the Oslo Tunnel following a cable fire at Skøyen Station. The replacement of the overhead wires would be started close to Elisenberg Station.
