= Andreas Schaft =

Norwegian civil servant (1760–1826)

Andreas Jørgensen Schaft (1760–1826) was a Norwegian civil servant (Norwegian: zahlkasserer). He was married to Petronelle Nicoline Green, with whom he had the daughter Martine Elisabeth Schaft (1799–1843), who 8 May 1824 married the missionary Magnus Andreas Gjør (1801-1874).

In 1799, Schaft bought a square at Frogner in Oslo which he named Elisenberg after his daughter Elisabeth. In 1807, Schaft built the paddock manor Schafteløkken at Elisenberg.

He was a Knight of the Order of the Dannebrog. Zahlkasserer Schafts plass, a Frogner square, was named after him in 2003.
