= Bjørvika Tunnel =

Immersed tunnel in Oslo, Norway

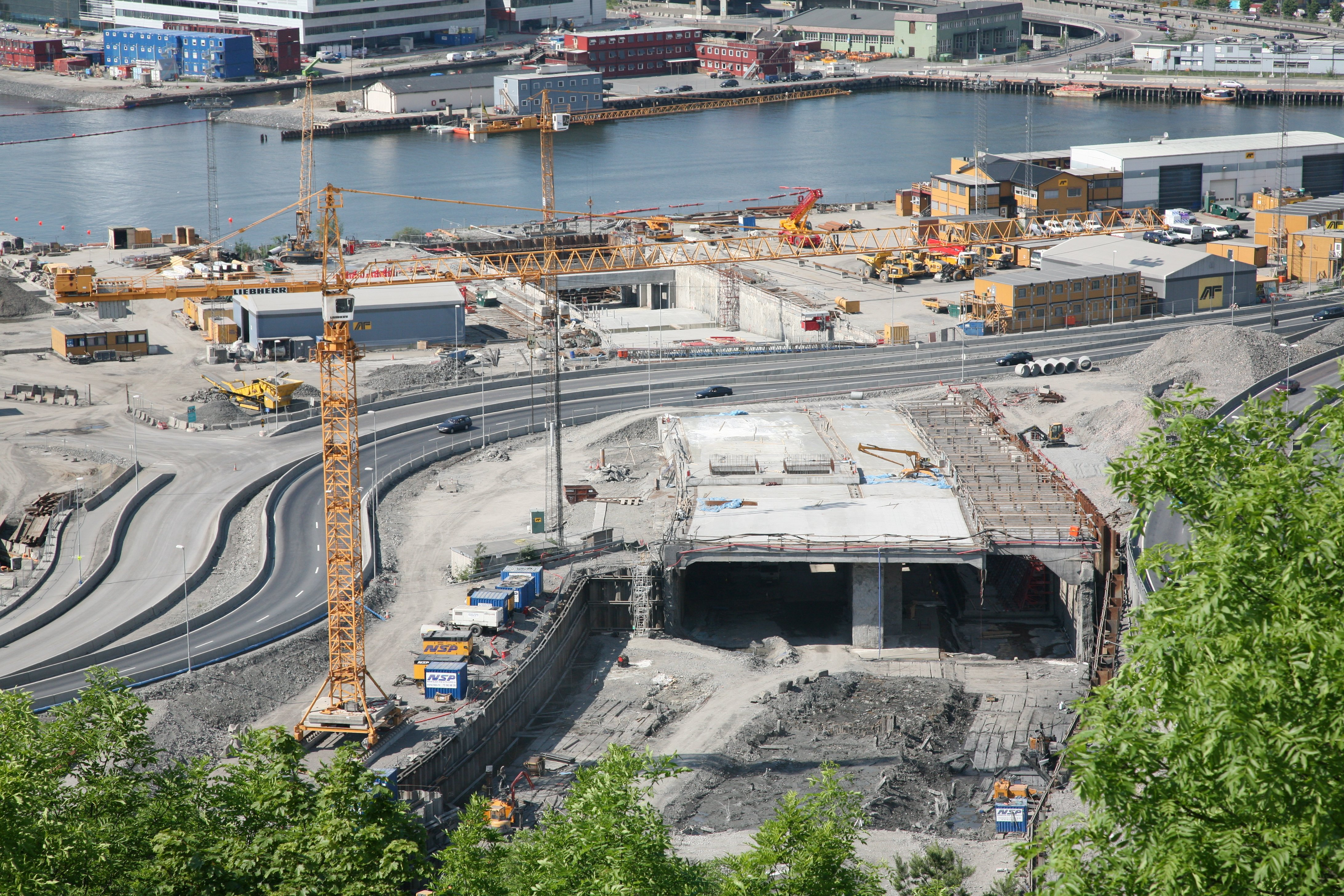

Overview
- Line: European Route E18
- Location: Oslo, Norway
- Coordinates: 59.9056°N 10.7525°E
- Start: Bjørvika
- End: Filipstad

Operation
- Opened: 2010
- Owner: Norwegian Public Roads Administration

Technical
- Length: 1,100 m (3,600 ft)
- No. of lanes: 6

The Bjørvika Tunnel (Norwegian: Bjørvikatunnelen) is a motorway immersed tunnel on European Route E18 in the city center of Oslo, Norway. The tunnel has two bores, with three lanes in each. In the west, it connects to the Festning Tunnel at Akershus Fortress and runs under the Bjørvika arm of the Oslofjord before ending in an intersection on the east shore, where it splits into Mosseveien (E18) and the Ekeberg Tunnel (National Road 190). The tunnel is 1,100 metres (3,600 ft) long, 675 meters of which run below sea level, and opened in September 2010. It was built by the Norwegian Public Roads Administration. The Bjørvika Tunnel is part of the Opera Tunnel complex which is the name of the interconnected system of tunnels between Ryen and Filipstad. The Bjørvika Tunnel is the first immersed tunnel in Norway.

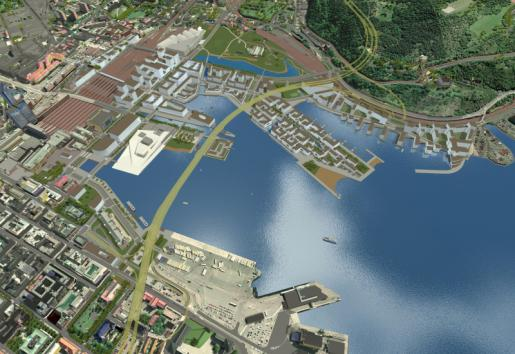
Illustration of the tunnel

The tunnel's cost was estimated to be around 4.6 billion kr, and was financed through Oslo Package 1, with part of the funding coming from the city's toll ring. The project includes an additional 8.0 kilometres (5.0 mi) of roads, 5.7 kilometres (3.5 mi) of pedestrian and cycle paths and 3.5 kilometres (2.2 mi) of bus lanes. The project will create a 6.0 kilometres (3.7 mi) continuous tunnel from Framnes (at the Kiel ferry terminal) to Ryen. The connection with the Festning Tunnel will require a 100 metres (330 ft) sinking of the latter, and it will have a basement built under it.
