= Elisenberg =

Neighborhood in Oslo, Norway

Coordinates: 59°55′15.09″N 10°42′10.96″E

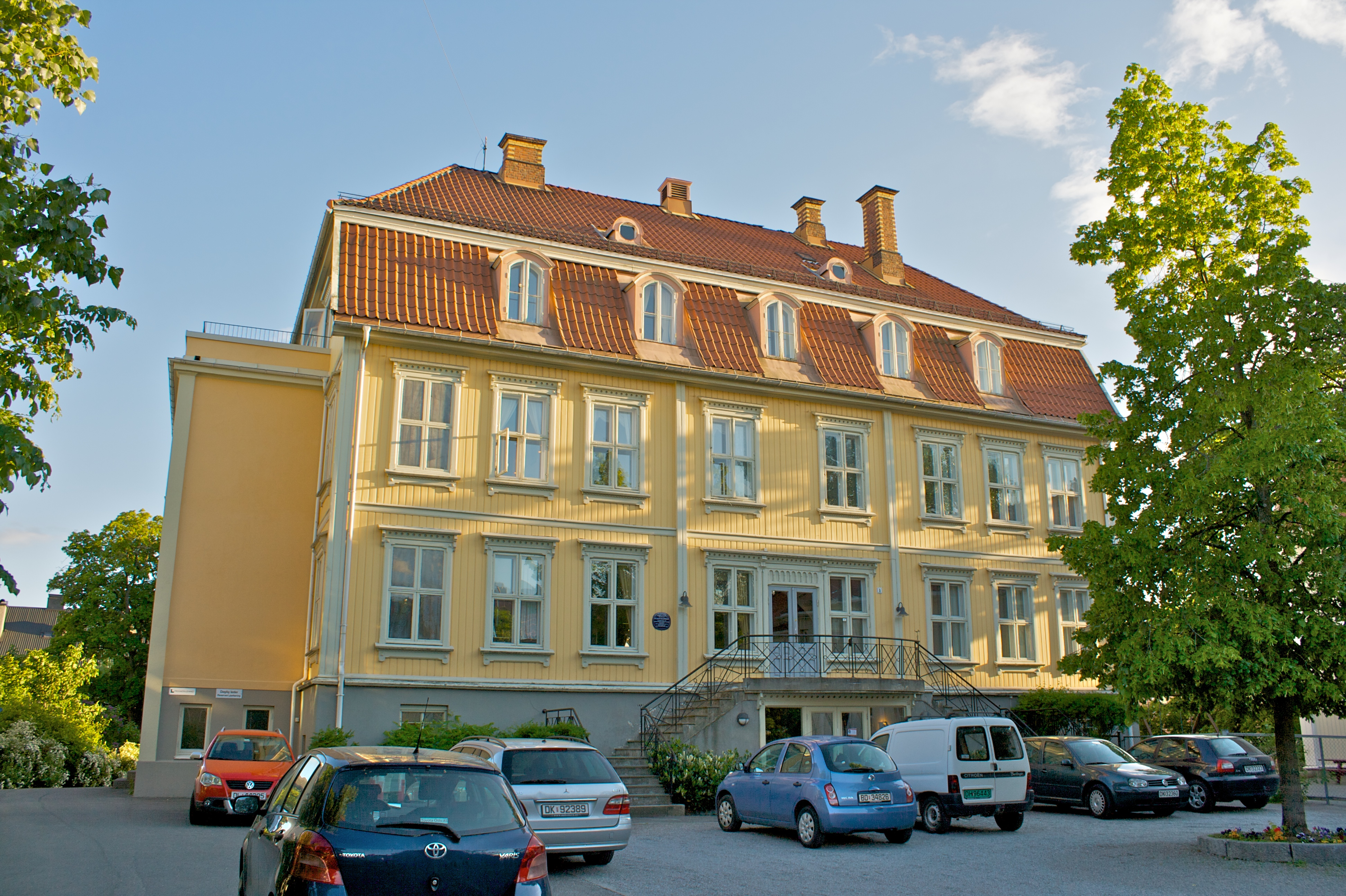
Schafteløkken

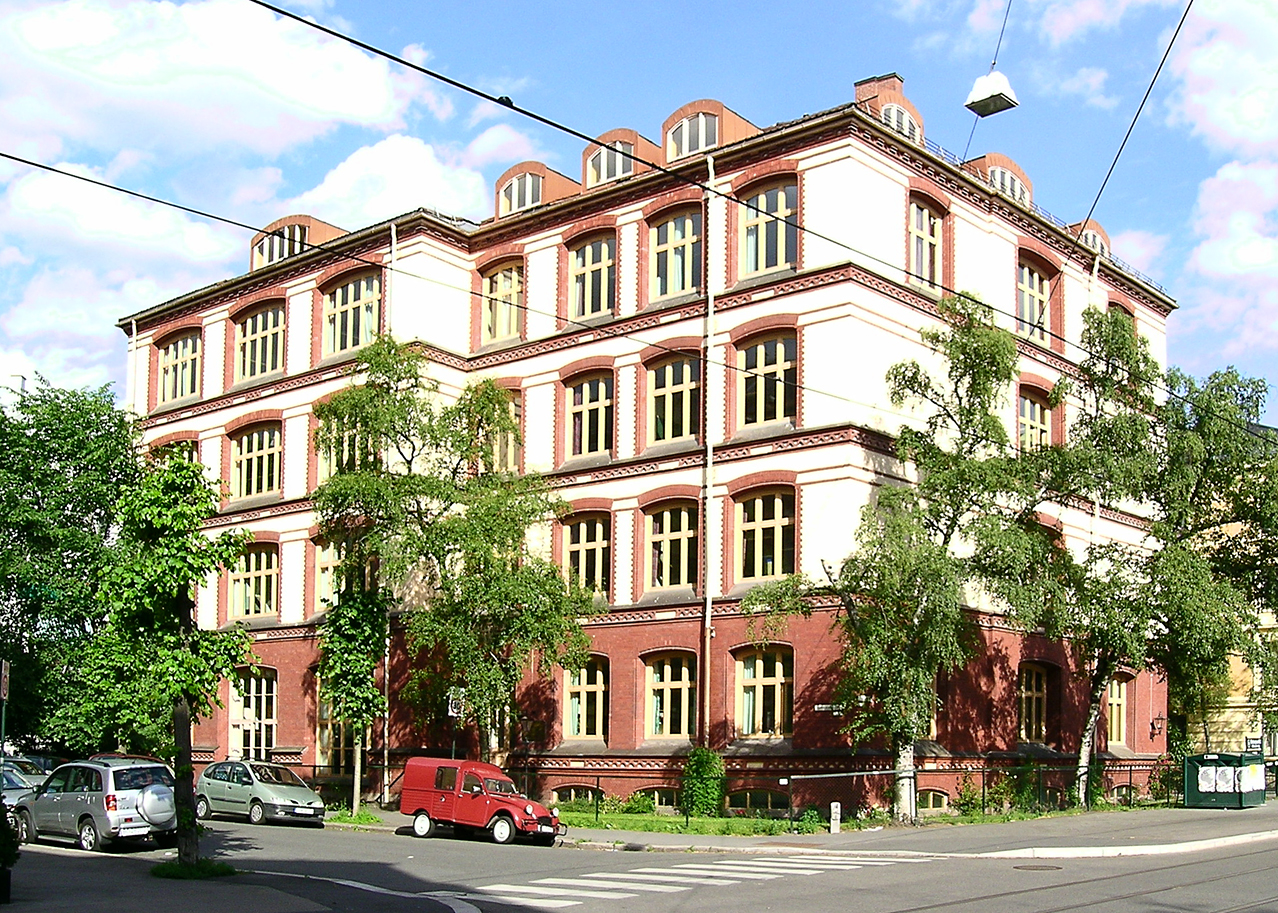
Bjørknes

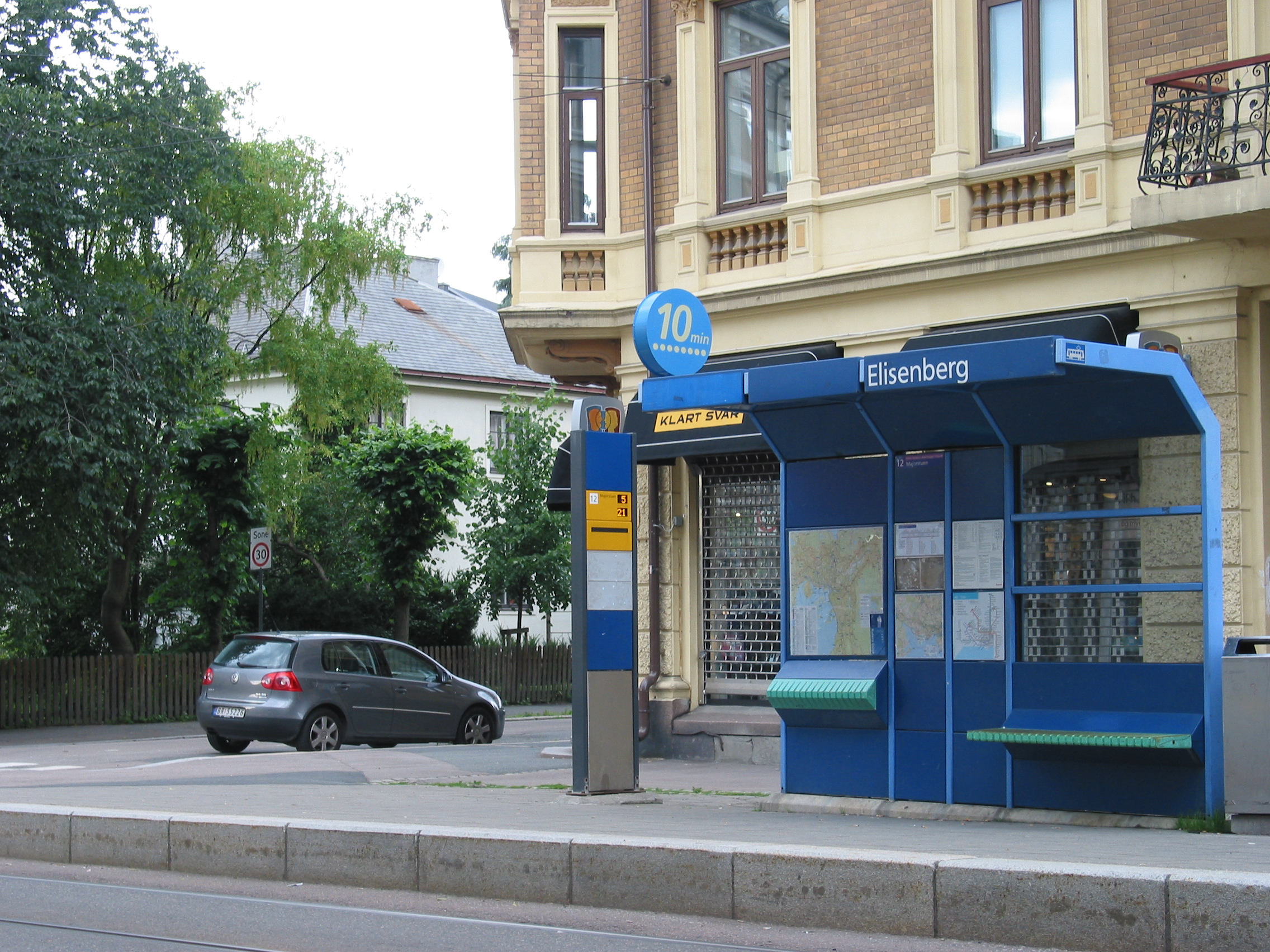
Elisenberg tram halt

Elisenberg is a neighborhood in the Frogner borough in Oslo, Norway.

It is defined as an area between the streets Elisenbergveien, Frognerveien, Bygdøy allé and Kristinelundveien. The borough grew up around the paddock manor Schafteløkken, divided from Frogner farm and bought by Andreas Schaft in 1799. He later named the paddock Elisenberg after his daughter. The property was bought by Fredrik Glad Balchen, who ran an institute for the deaf-mute between 1857 and 1891. A corporation named Elisenbergløkkens Aktieselskab was involved when the area was built-up from the 1890s, mostly with four-storey apartment blocks. It also acquired the street Elisenbergveien in 1896, which later became publicly owned. In 1910 Schafteløkken was bought by the congregation in Frogner Church. They wanted to tear the manor down in the 1970s and 1980s, and replace it with other housing, but were stopped.

Elisenberg School is a defunct school. The first school with this name was instituted in 1958, when the municipality took over an old school from 1895, whose last name was Vestheim School. In 1969 Elisenberg School was closed. The building was taken over in the same year by Oslo Husflidskole ("Oslo Handicraft School"), founded 1967. In 1976 this school changed its name to Elisenberg Upper Secondary School. It went defunct in 1990, and the building was taken over by Bjørknes School and College.

The neighborhood is served by the Oslo Tramway station Elisenberg on the Frogner Line. It was also supposed to be served by the underground railway station Elisenberg Station on the Drammen Line, but this station was never finished and has never been taken into use.
