= Oslo Concert Hall =

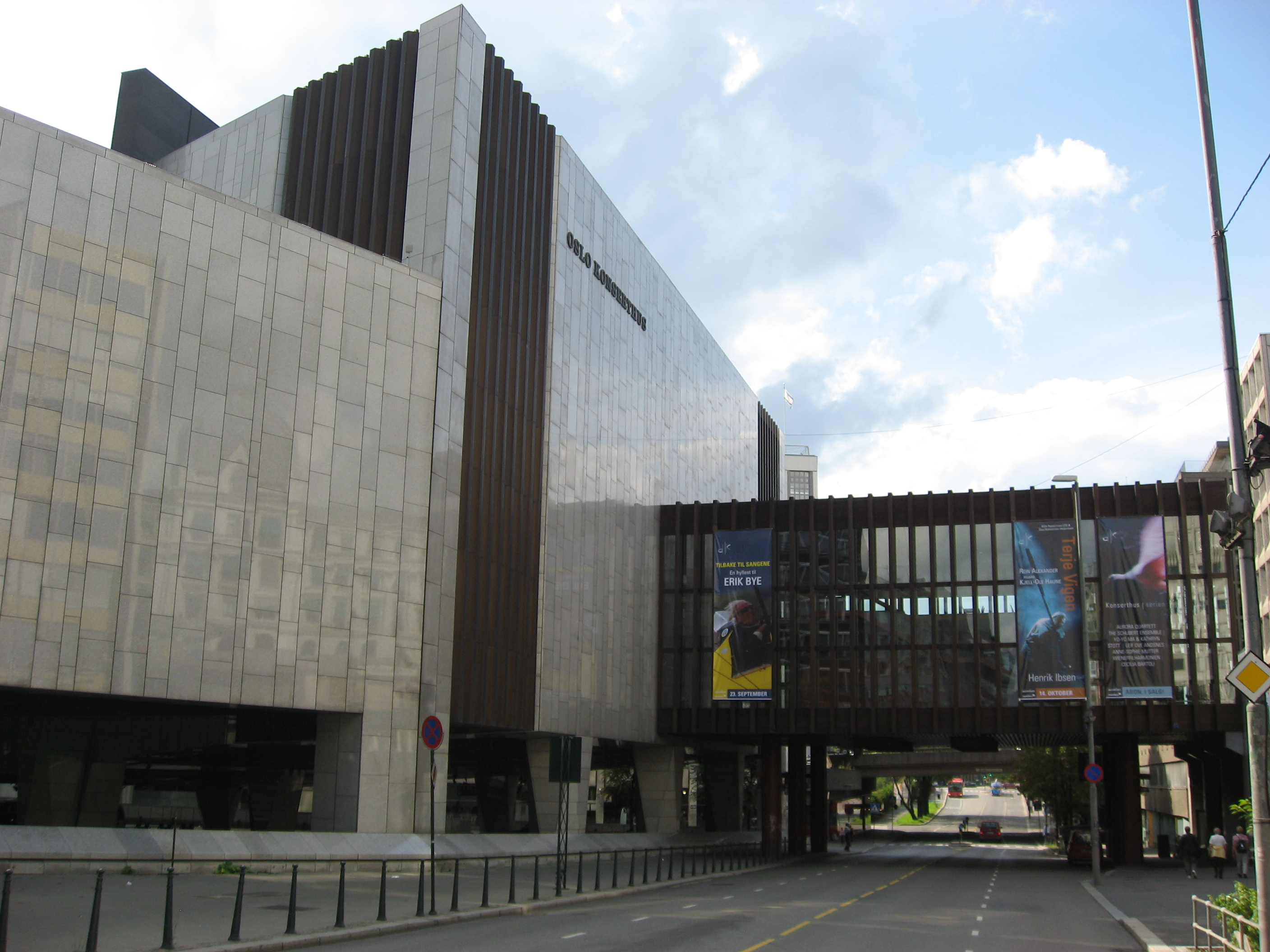
- Interactive map of the Oslo Concert Hall area

General information
- Location: Vika, Oslo, Norway
- Coordinates: 59°54′47″N 10°43′47″E
- Inaugurated: 22 March 1977

Design and construction
- Architect: Gösta Åbergh

Other information
- Seating capacity: 1,404

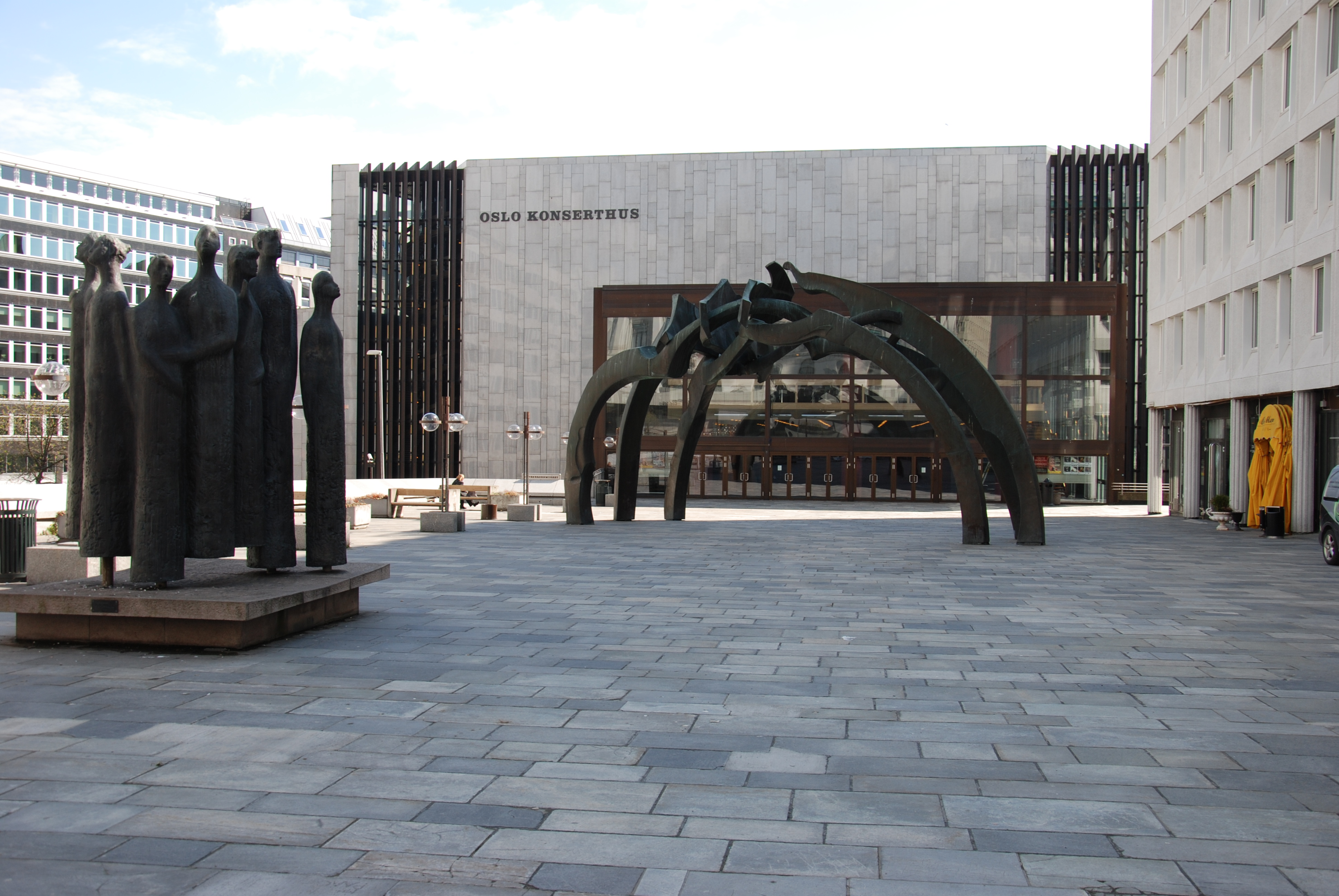
Oslo Concert Hall

Oslo Concert Hall (Norwegian: Oslo Konserthus) is a concert hall located in Vika, a part of Oslo city centre in Norway. It is the base of the Oslo Philharmonic Orchestra (Oslo-Filharmonien), but it also aims to be one of the premier music venues for the general musical and cultural life of Norway, offering a broad variety of musical styles from classical, world music, and popular entertainment by both Norwegian and international artists and groups. It presents more than 300 events yearly and receives more than 200,000 visitors.

== History ==
For a long time, Oslo lacked a proper concert hall, and the Oslo Philharmonic did not have a regular hall for their rehearsals. Sometimes the rehearsals could be on different locations every day through the same project.

=== Construction ===
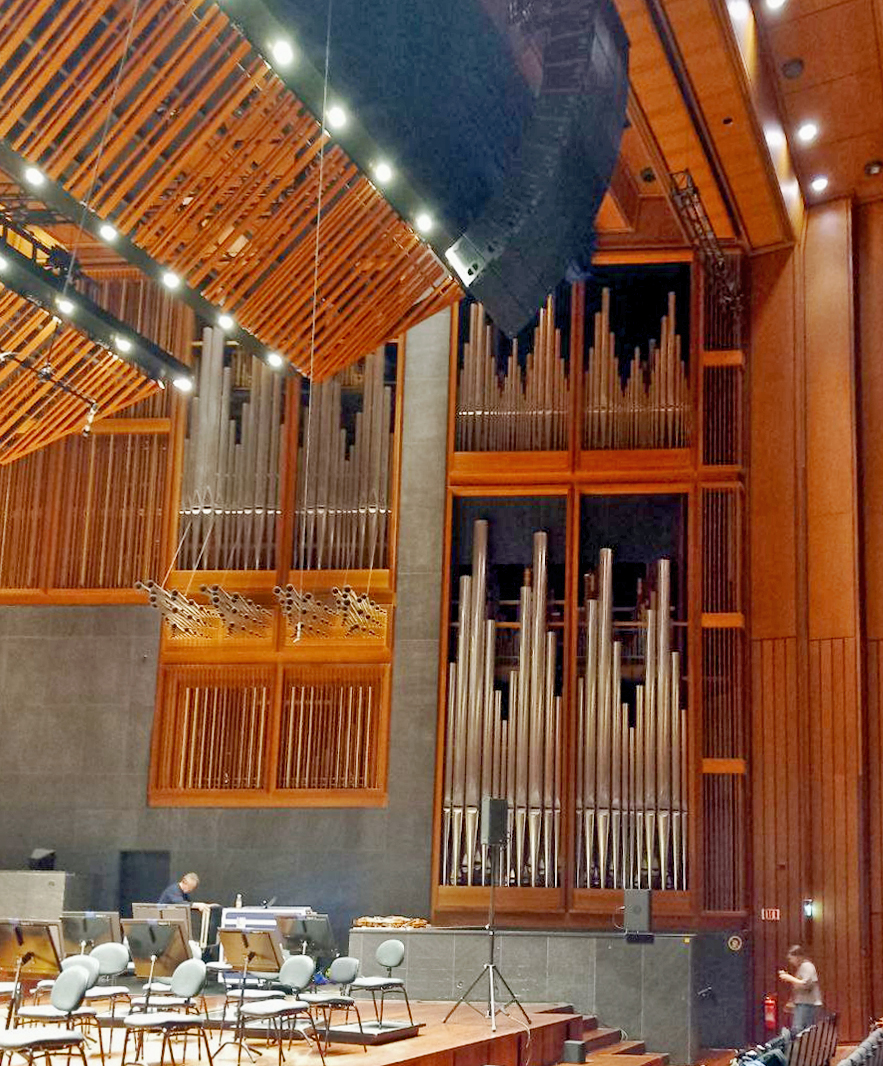
Oslo Concert Hall pipe organ

After decades of debate and delay, an architectal competition was arranged in 1955 and final drafts for the concert hall were presented in 1965, based on Gösta Åbergh's winning proposal. Oslo Konserthus AS was founded in October 1966 and, on 22 March 1977, the concert hall was finally opened. In September the same year, a specially build organ (with 7000 pipes) from Göttingen, Germany was installed. It was the largest organ in Norway until 2014.

== Building ==
The building consists of two concert halls, several meeting and practise rooms, large foyers and bars, a box office and an office wing. The main hall has a maximum capacity of more than 1,404 and the small hall has 266.

The foyers can be used as exhibition areas, and the bars have a capacity of serving up to 1,400 people. Also the open area in front of the hall and the premises below belong to Oslo Konserthus AS. The Stenersen Museum (Stenersenmuseet), with its café Diorama, are located in the latter.

In 2000 Mariss Jansons, then conductor of the Oslo Philharmonic Orchestra, resigned his position after disputes with the city over the poor acoustics of the hall.
