= Villa Filipstad =

19th-century Norwegian building

Coordinates: 59.9107°N 10.7186°E

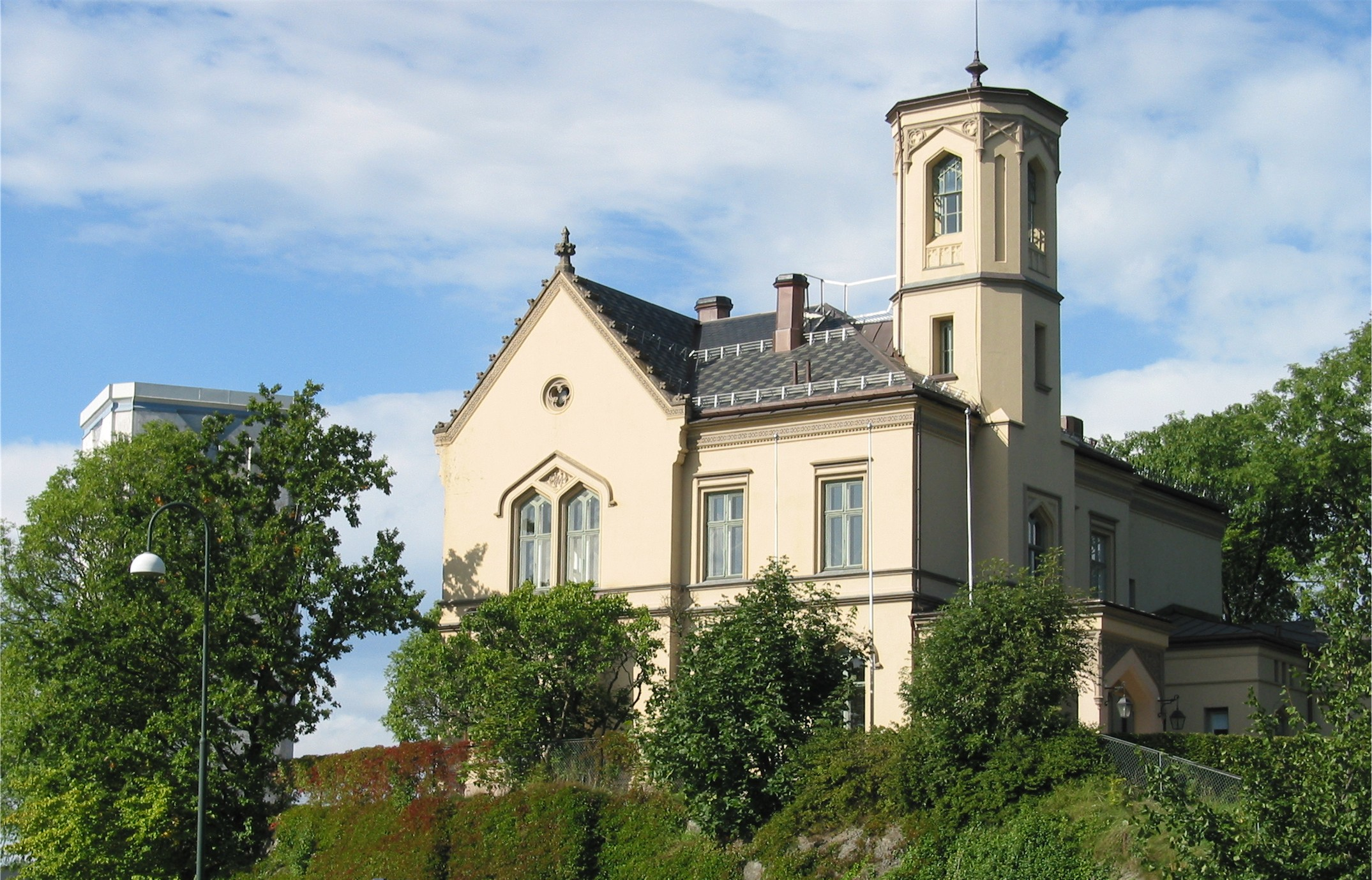
- Villa Filipstad
- Interactive map of the Villa Filipstad area

General information
- Location: Oslo, Norway
- Construction started: 1860s
- Completed: 1864
- Client: Jørgen Haslev Heftye

Design and construction
- Architect: Georg Andreas Bull

Villa Filipstad is a notable building in the neighborhood Filipstad in Oslo, Norway. It is located at Munkedamsveien 62. The villa is very prominent in the terrain, being situated atop a crag. It is similar to, and can be viewed from, Oscarshall across Frognerkilen.

== History ==
It was commissioned by banker Jørgen Haslev Heftye, and was finished in 1864. The architect was Georg Andreas Bull (1829–1917).

Heftye's family had owned the property since 1805. His son Johannes Heftye later inherited it. From 1909 the property was owned by the state, specifically the Norwegian State Railways. They used it as the director-general's residence. After the reorganization of the State Railways, the property has been owned by Rom Eiendom, a subsidiary of Bane NOR responsible for managing the commercial sections of the company's real estate. Tenants in the later years include Norwegian Directorate for Public Libraries and, currently, the company Mantena, the former workshop unit of the Norwegian State Railways.
