= Skøyen–Filipstad Line =

Railway line in Norway

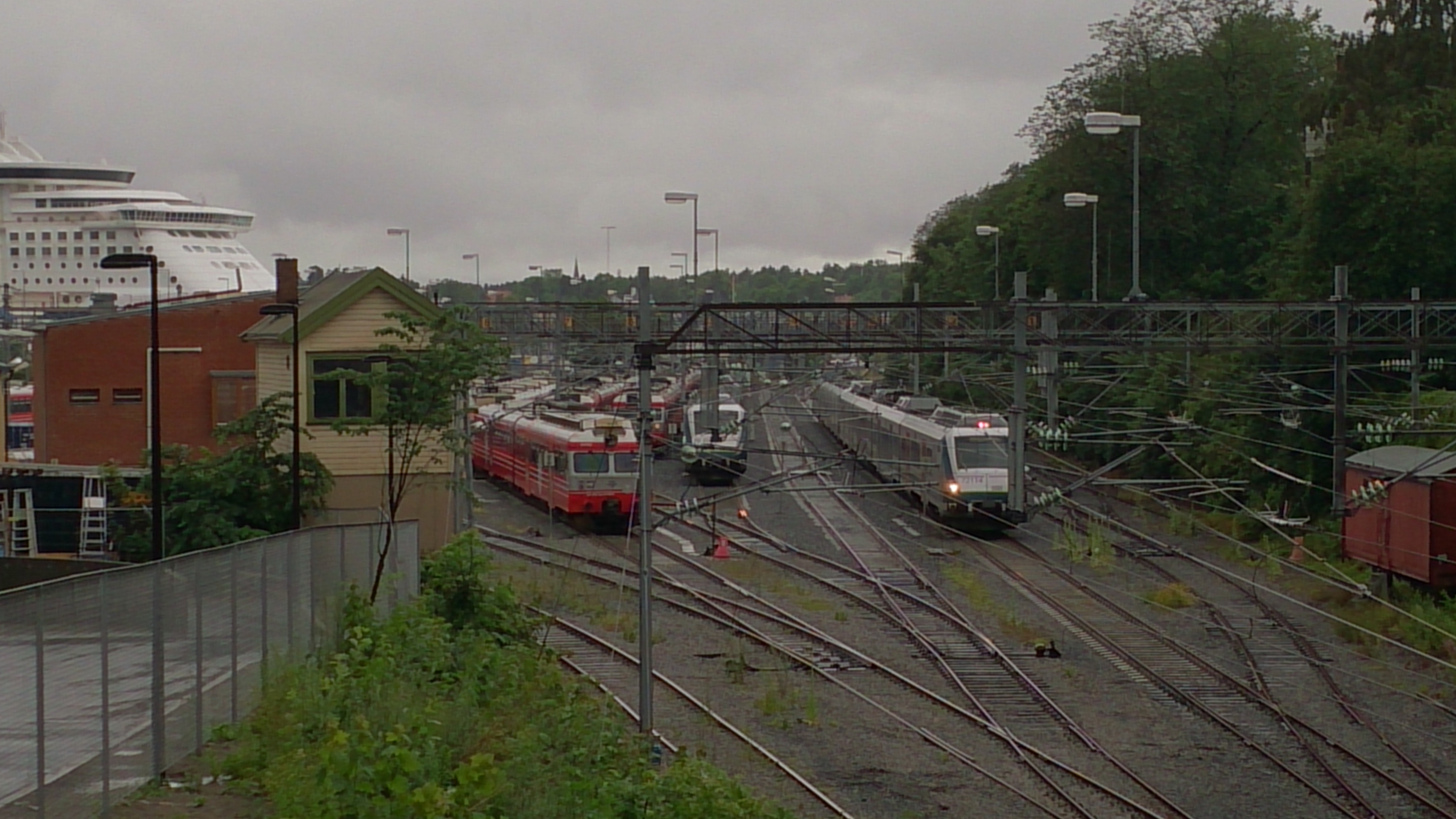
- The Termini at Filipstad

Overview
- Owner: Norwegian National Rail Administration
- Termini: Skøyen; Filipstad

Service
- Type: Railway
- System: Norwegian Railway
- Operator(s): CargoNet

History
- Opened: 1872

Technical
- Line length: 2 km (1.2 mi)
- Number of tracks: Double
- Character: Freight
- Track gauge: 1,435 mm (4 ft 8 1/2 in)
- Electrification: 15 kV 16.7 Hz AC

The Skøyen–Filipstad Line (Norwegian: Skøyen–Filipstadlinjen) is a 2-kilometer (1.2 mi) long railway line between Skøyen and Filipstad in Oslo, Norway. It is used for freight trains to Oslo Port.

== History ==
The line was built as part of the Drammen Line that opened in 1872, as a narrow gauge 1,067 mm (3 ft 6 in) railway. It was rebuilt to standard gauge in 1922 and at the same time electrified. Later the line was rebuilt to double track. The line consisted of the last two kilometers of the Drammen Line that terminated at Oslo West Station (Oslo V). In 1980, the Oslo Tunnel between Skøyen and Oslo Central Station opened and Oslo V was closed. The last stretch of the Drammen Line was then transferred to a pure freight line.
