= Oslo Port Line =

Railway line in Oslo, Norway

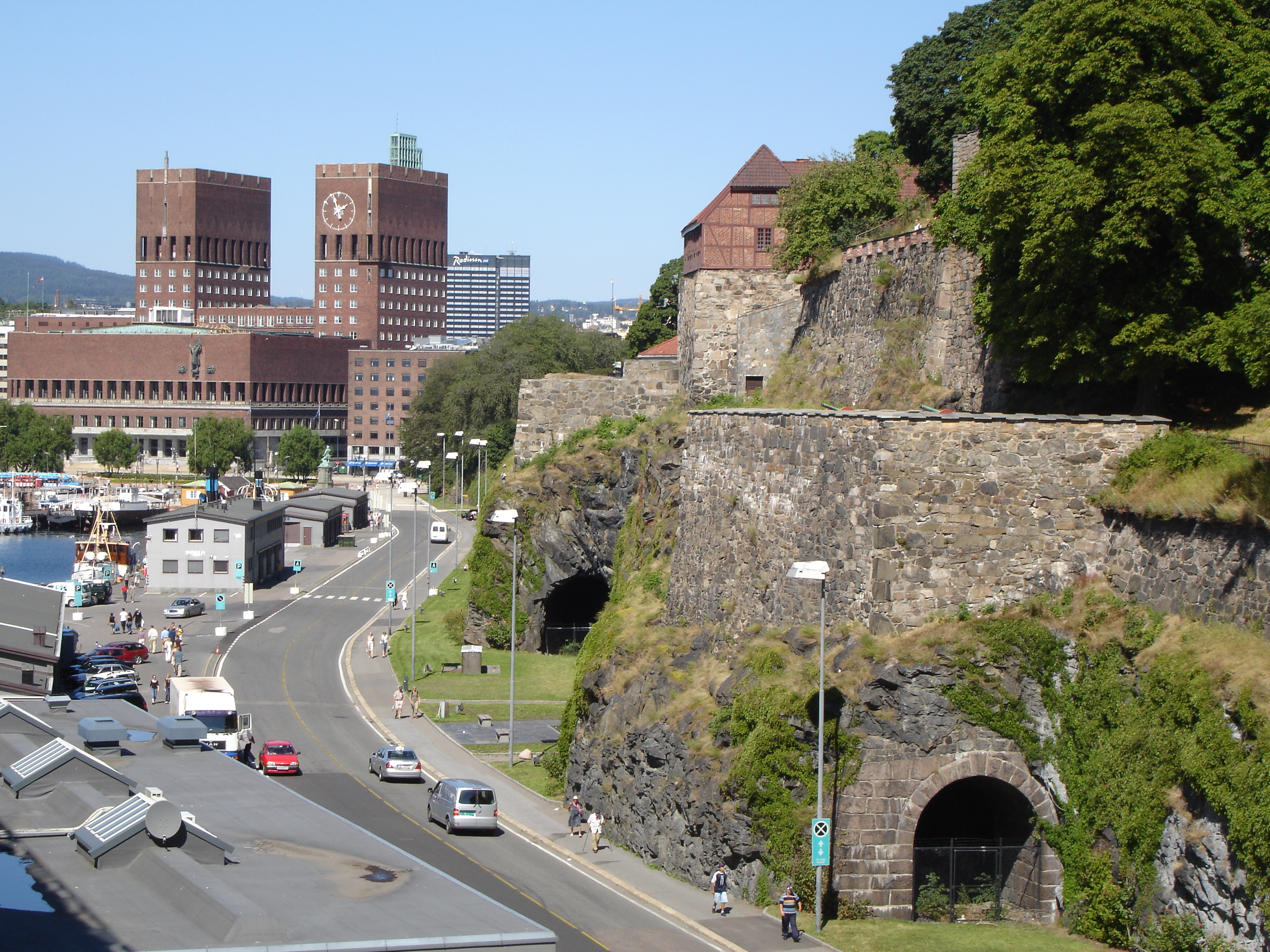
- Tunnels at Akershus Fortress

Overview
- Status: Abandoned
- Owner: Norwegian State Railways
- Termini: Oslo Ø; Oslo V
- Stations: 2

Service
- Type: Railway
- System: Norwegian Railway
- Operator(s): Norwegian State Railways

History
- Opened: 13 November 1907
- Closed: 1983

Technical
- Line length: 2.2 km (1.4 mi)
- Number of tracks: Single
- Character: Freight
- Track gauge: 1,435 mm (4 ft 8 1/2 in) standard gauge
- Electrification: No

The Oslo Port Line (Norwegian: Havnebanen i Oslo) is an abandoned Norwegian railway that went between the two main railway stations in Oslo, Oslo Østbanestasjon and Oslo Vestbanestasjon. The line was 2.2 kilometres (1.4 mi) long, 1,435 mm (4 ft 8 1/2 in) standard gauge single track, but not electrified.

The line enabled trains to travel between the two train stations, but the line was located in the streets, making it a delicate task and stopping traffic in the City Hall Square, the plaza in front of Oslo City Hall. The railway also connected to the port in Oslo, and using the new line it was possible to transfer cargo directly from the railway to ships. Only a few freight trains per day used the line and no passenger trains. Passengers who wanted to transfer between the two stations had to find alternate means of transportation. The line was opened on 13 November 1907, but closed in 1983, after the Oslo Tunnel between Skøyen and the new Oslo Central Station was opened in 1980.
