= Oslo Tunnel =

Railway tunnel between Olav Kyrres plass and Oslo Central Station

Coordinates: 59°54′N 10°43′E

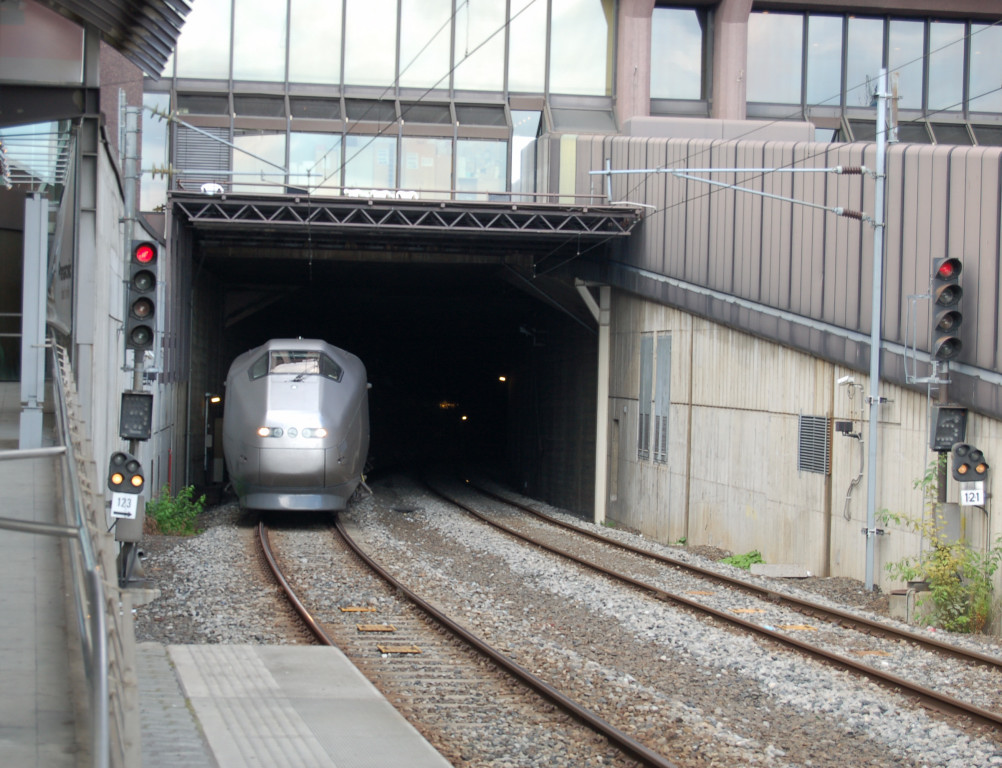
- Class 71 train exiting the Oslo Tunnel at Oslo Central Station
- Interactive map of Oslo Tunnel

Overview
- Line: Drammen Line
- Location: Oslo, Norway
- System: Norwegian railway
- Start: Oslo Central Station
- End: Skøyen Station
- No. of stations: 1

Operation
- Opened: 1 June 1980
- Owner: Bane NOR

Technical
- Line length: 3,632 m (2.257 mi)
- No. of tracks: Double
- Track gauge: 1,435 mm (4 ft 8 1/2 in)
- Electrified: 15 kV 16.7 Hz AC

The Oslo Tunnel (Norwegian: Oslotunnelen) is a 3,632-metre (2.257 mi), double-track, railway tunnel which runs between Olav Kyrres plass and Oslo Central Station (Oslo S) in Oslo, Norway. The tunnel constitutes the easternmost section of the Drammen Line and runs below the central business district of Oslo. It features the four-track Nationaltheatret Station, Norway's second-busiest railway station, where the Oslo Tunnels lies directly beneath the Common Tunnel of the Oslo Metro. At Frogner, the Elisenberg Station was built, but has never been used. The tunnel is the busiest section of railway line in Norway and serves all west-bound trains from Oslo, including many services of the Oslo Commuter Rail and the Airport Express Train.

Traditionally, Oslo had two stations, the larger Oslo East Station (or Oslo Ø, located at the spot of the current Oslo S) and Oslo West Station (Oslo V), which served the Drammen Line. This caused a physical barrier between the two parts of the railway network, only connected by the Oslo Port Line which ran partly in city streets. Formal planning of a central station and a tunnel connecting the Drammen Line to Oslo Ø started in 1938, and the final plans were approved in 1968. The Oslo Tunnel opened on 1 June 1980, and made it possible to close Oslo V in 1989. Nationaltheatret saw a major upgrade in 1999, when it was expanded to four tracks, and from 2008 to 2010, the tunnel saw a major technical upgrade. There are plans to build a second tunnel to increase train capacity west of Oslo.

== Route ==
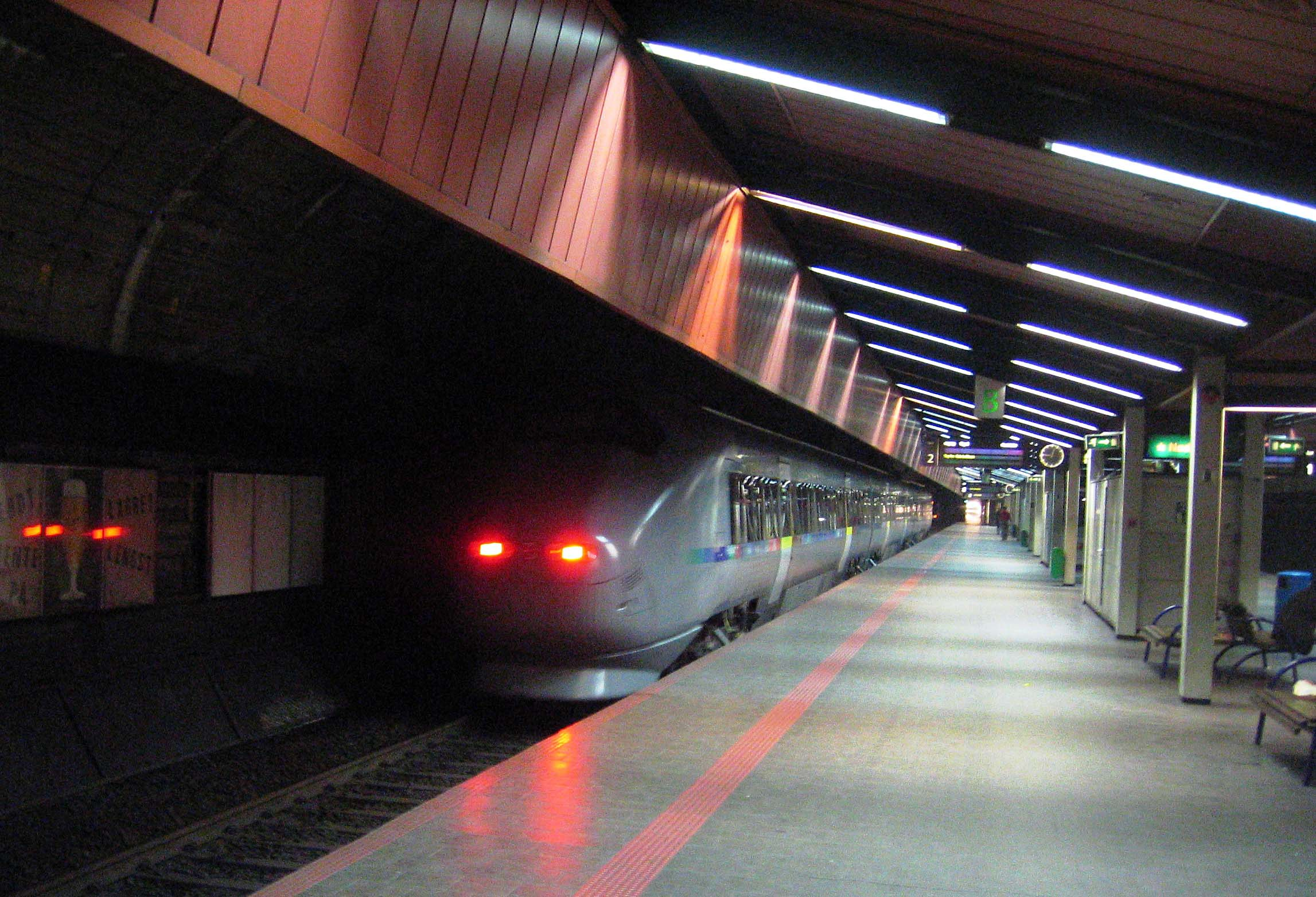
A Class 71 train at Nationaltheatret Station

The tunnel constitutes the easternmost 3,632 metres (2.257 mi) of the Drammen Line, and runs between Oslo S and Skøyen. At Oslo S, 12 of the 19 tracks (platforms 2 through 13) connect to the tunnel, which is shaped as a funnel, eventually merging the twelve tracks into two. The tunnel runs below some important heritage buildings in Oslo, including Basarhallene, the Parliament of Norway Building and Oslo Cathedral.

Nationaltheatret Station is the second-busiest railway station in the country, and is located below the Oslo Metro station with the same name. The station has four tracks and two 250-metre-long (820 ft) island platforms, serving the central business district of Oslo. Through this section, the line runs below the Common Tunnel of the Oslo Metro for 280 metres (920 ft). At this point, the line is 18 metres (59 ft) below the surface.

Elisenberg Station, located in Frogner, is partially built, including a 220-metre-long (720 ft) island platform and one of the entrances. The line follows Bygdøy allé and surfaces just west of Olav Kyrres plass. Immediately afterwards, the Skøyen–Filipstad Line merges into the Drammen Line. The next station along the line is Skøyen Station.

== Service ==
The Oslo Tunnel is the most heavily trafficked section of mainline railway in Norway. It has a theoretical capacity of 40 trains per hour in each direction, and an applied capacity of 24 trains per hour in each direction. In rush hour, there are up to 20 trains operating through the tunnel, with a capacity of 8,000 passengers per hour.

All eight lines of the Oslo Commuter Rail have some or all of their services operate through the tunnel, although many of these terminate at Skøyen. The Airport Express Train operates four hourly services through the tunnel and Vy operate regional trains along the Vestfold Line, and Go-Ahead Norge and Vy Tog operate intercity trains along the Sørlandet Line and Bergen Line through the tunnel. Freight trains along the Sørland Line operate through the tunnel, although only at night, while freight trains along the Bergen Line do not, instead using the Roa–Hønefoss Line.

== History ==
By the 1930s, Oslo had two main railway stations, Oslo East Station and Oslo West Station. The Drammen Line, consisting of commuter trains, and regional and intercity trains from the Sørland Line and the Vestfold Line, terminated at Oslo V. The Østfold, Trunk and Gjøvik Lines terminated at Oslo Ø. Between the two stations ran the Oslo Port Line, which in part ran in the city streets and was only used for a limited number of freight trains. Several plans had been launched to connect the two stations, with the most prominent being a line running west of Oslo and merging with the Gjøvik Line at Grefsen, and an elevated line from Oslo V to Tordensskiolds plass, in a tunnel under Akershus Fortress and again as an elevated line past Oslo Stock Exchange to Oslo Ø.

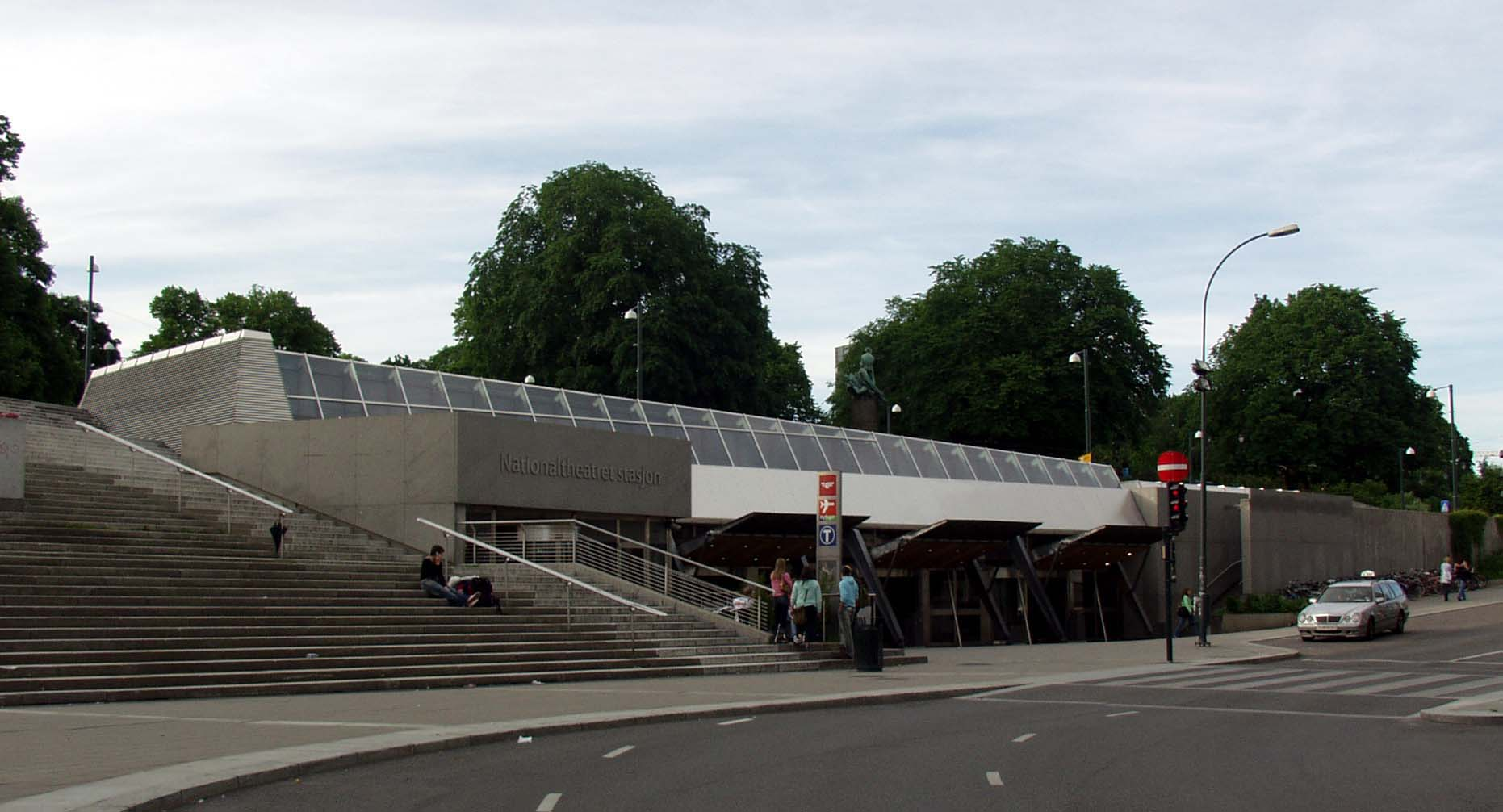
Entrance to Nationaltheatret from Ruseløkkveien

In 1938, the Station Committee of 1938 was established to look into a possible connection of the Drammen Line to Oslo Ø and extension of the railway station. Led by Axel Grenholm, the committee recommended one of two alternatives: either establish a branch from the Drammen Line and built a tunnel under the city center, in which all trains would terminate at Oslo Ø. The tunnel was proposed run from Lassons gate west of Oslo V to Fred. Olsens gate, with an intermediate station close to the location of Oslo V. The proposed tunnel would be 1,660 metres (1.03 mi) long and largely run through clay, making construction more difficult and expensive. Alternatively, a branch of Drammen Line should be built around the city and connect with the Gjøvik Line at Grefsen. Commuter trains would continue to run to Oslo V, while regional and intercity trains would run to Oslo Ø. The committee stated that it preferred the former suggestion.

In 1946, the Planning Office for Oslo Central Station, led by Fin Hvoslef, was established by the government. In 1950, they presented a new report, which recommended that a new route for the tunnel be considered to ease construction and increase safety. This was in part based on an engineering report from 1949, which had made the first detailed plans for the line. It was a compromise between the Norwegian State Railways' need for a line as straight as possible, and Oslo Municipality's demands that the construction should not be a risk to buildings in the area. The ground in Oslo consists of clay-filled grooves up to 30 metres (98 ft) deep. The area also contains alum shale, which expands when it comes into contact with air and water and can attack concrete, argillaceous schist, cracks with clay and water, and hard volcanic rocks.

Another committee, led by Oddvar Halvorsen, was established in 1960 to look at the matter again. Also it recommended a tunnel and a central station. However, it felt that the tunnel should be longer and intersect with the Drammen Line at a point between Skarpsno and Skøyen, and build a second station at Frogner. The proposal was presented to the Parliament of Norway on 4 November 1961, along with several other matters related to rail transport investments. Construction of the Oslo Tunnel and Oslo Central Station was passed unanimously.

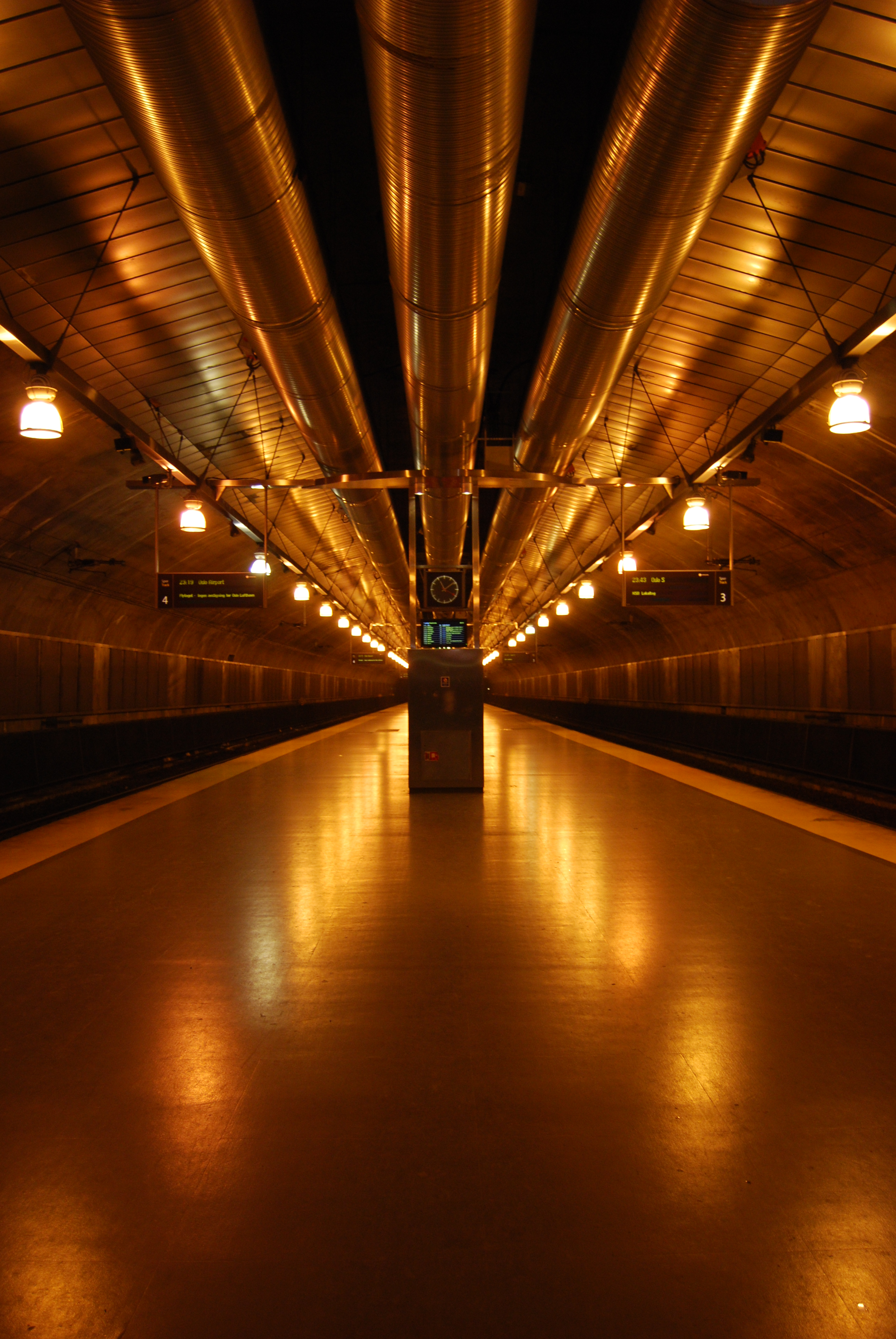
Eastbound platform at Nationaltheatret

Another planning office was established in 1962, initially led by Erik Himle. The final plans for the route were passed by parliament in 1968, and construction started in 1971. The main contractors were Ingeniør Thor Furuholmen, Dipl.ing. Kaare Backer, NSB, Jernbaneanlegget Oslo Sentralstasjon and Ingeniørbygg. Consultants included Ingeniørene Bonde & Co., Peer Qvam's arkitektkontor and the Norwegian Geotechnical Institute.

The tunnel was officially opened on 30 May 1980 by Minister of Transport and Communications, Ronald Bye, and officially taken into use on 1 June. When it opened, it was the eighth-longest railway tunnel in Norway, although since 2005 it has been the thirteenth-longest. The tunnel cost 625 million Norwegian krone (NOK), of which Oslo Municipality had paid NOK 170 million. At first, the tunnel was used by commuter trains from Lillestrøm to Drammen and Spikkestad, and trains from Eidsvoll and Årnes used the tunnel and turned at Skøyen. Oslo Central Station was taken into use on 26 November 1986. On 27 May 1989, Oslo West Station was closed and all traffic transferred to Oslo S.

In October 1997, construction of an upgraded Nationaltheatret Station started and was taken into use on 16 December 1999. The work expanded the station from two to four platforms, thus increasing the applied capacity for the whole tunnel from 16 to 24 trains per direction per hour. The expansion cost NOK 920 million, which included blasting 110,000 cubic metres (3,900,000 cu ft) of rock and pouring 33,000 cubic metres (1,200,000 cu ft) of concrete. The work resulted in 830 metres (2,720 ft) of new tunnel, a new entrance hall and art. The station was designed for 40,000 passengers daily.

In 2008, the old section of Nationaltheatret Station was renovated. Upgrades included new lighting, a new public address system, new escalators, a more powerful fire safety system, improved emergency exits and replacement of cables. The upgrade made the old section lighter, as it was previously painted in dark red, and visually similar to the new section. Between 2008 and 2012, the Norwegian National Rail Administration is performing a major upgrade to the section between Lysaker and Etterstad, including the Oslo Tunnel. Among the upgrades are axle counters, mounting of an overhead conductor rail, new switches, switch heaters at the tunnel openings and new tracks.

== Future ==
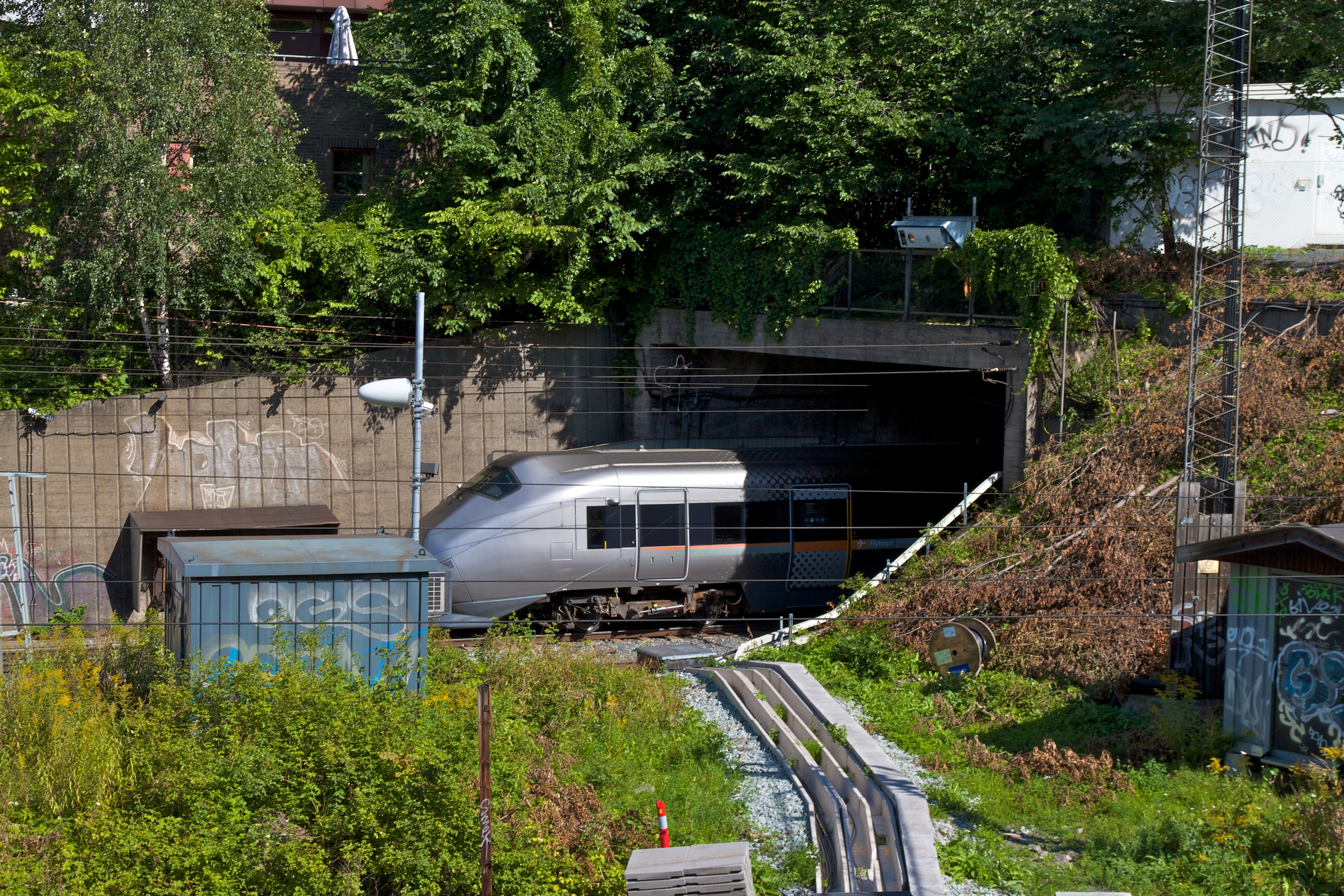
An Airport Express Train leaving the Oslo Tunnel's west end

The Oslo Tunnel is the largest bottle-neck in the railway system in Norway, and delays caused around the tunnel can spread throughout the whole network. The local rail lines have only one or two departures per hour, but more are desired in order to attract people who want to find departure times matching work hours. The now defunct National Rail Administration had stated that until 2040 at the earliest, it is unnecessary with more capacity through the West Corridor, i.e. running west of Oslo. This includes possible upgrades to the railway lines around Oslo, such as high-speed lines along the Østfold and Vestfold Lines, and to Lillehammer. In 2012, after the completion of the Asker Line, a new schedule plan has been proposed. NSB, the Airport Express Train and CargoNet have all asked for more slots through the tunnel than is available. One possible solution is to decrease the reserve capacity, thus increasing the capacity from 24 to 30 trains per hour per direction. However, the tunnel is already characterized as "critically overloaded".

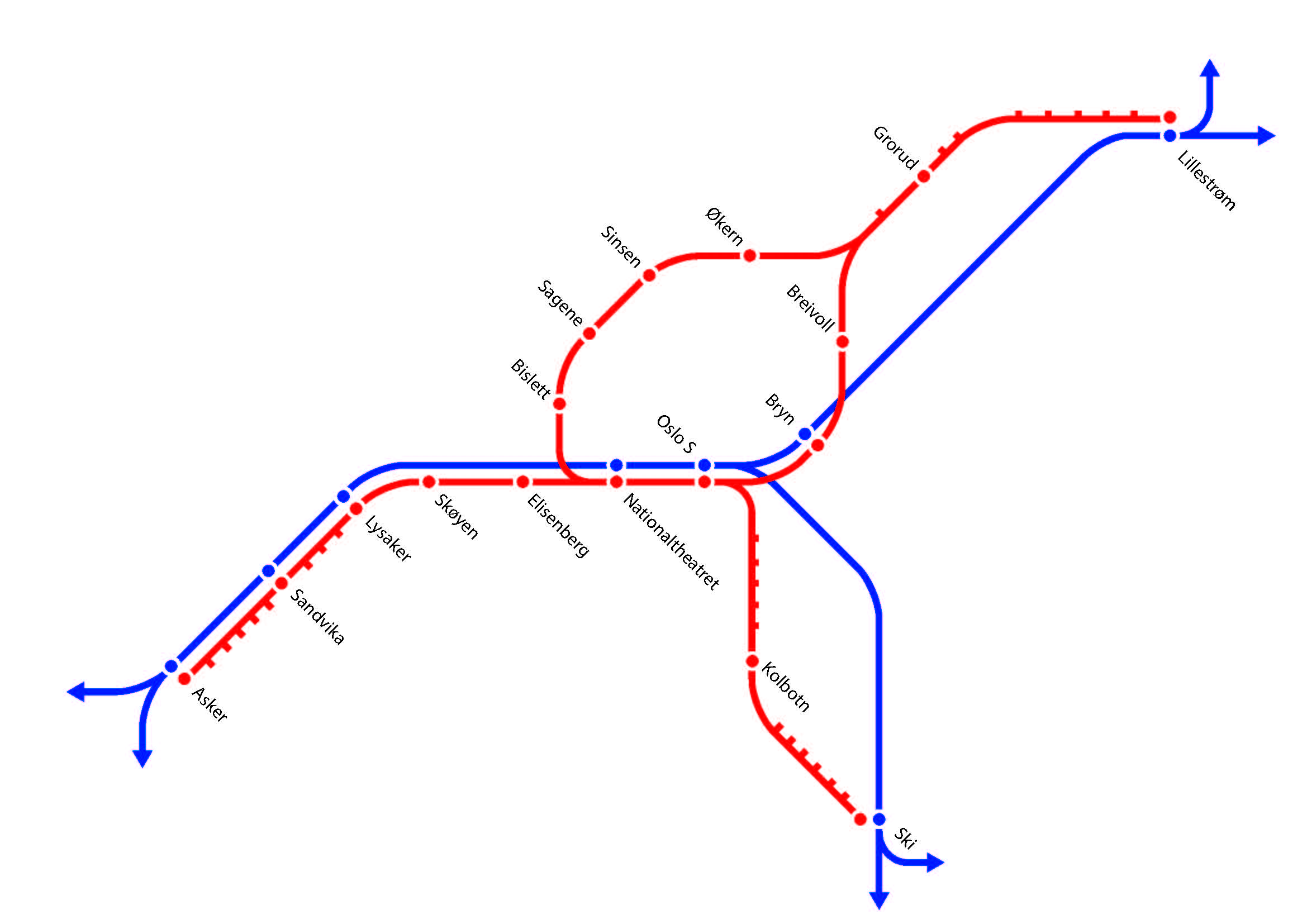
Potential second Oslo Tunnel route

Should a new tunnel be built, it would not necessarily run next to the Oslo Tunnel. One proposal from the National Rail Administration calls for a separate commuter train station to be built underground, at the location of Oslo Bus Terminal, within walking distance of Oslo S. This proposal involves the line connecting to the existing route before reaching Nationaltheatret. The lobby organisation Norsk Bane have called for a line to run further north, and serve Majorstuen, where there is a major metro and tramway hub. Norsk Bane also call for the tunnel to be built for higher speeds, and state that it is necessary to build high-speed rail to Bergen and Stavanger. Combined with a new line from Drammen to the tunnel, it would allow travel time from Drammen and Oslo to be reduced to 18 minutes.
