= 1943 Filipstad explosion =

Coordinates: 59.9083°N 10.7148°E

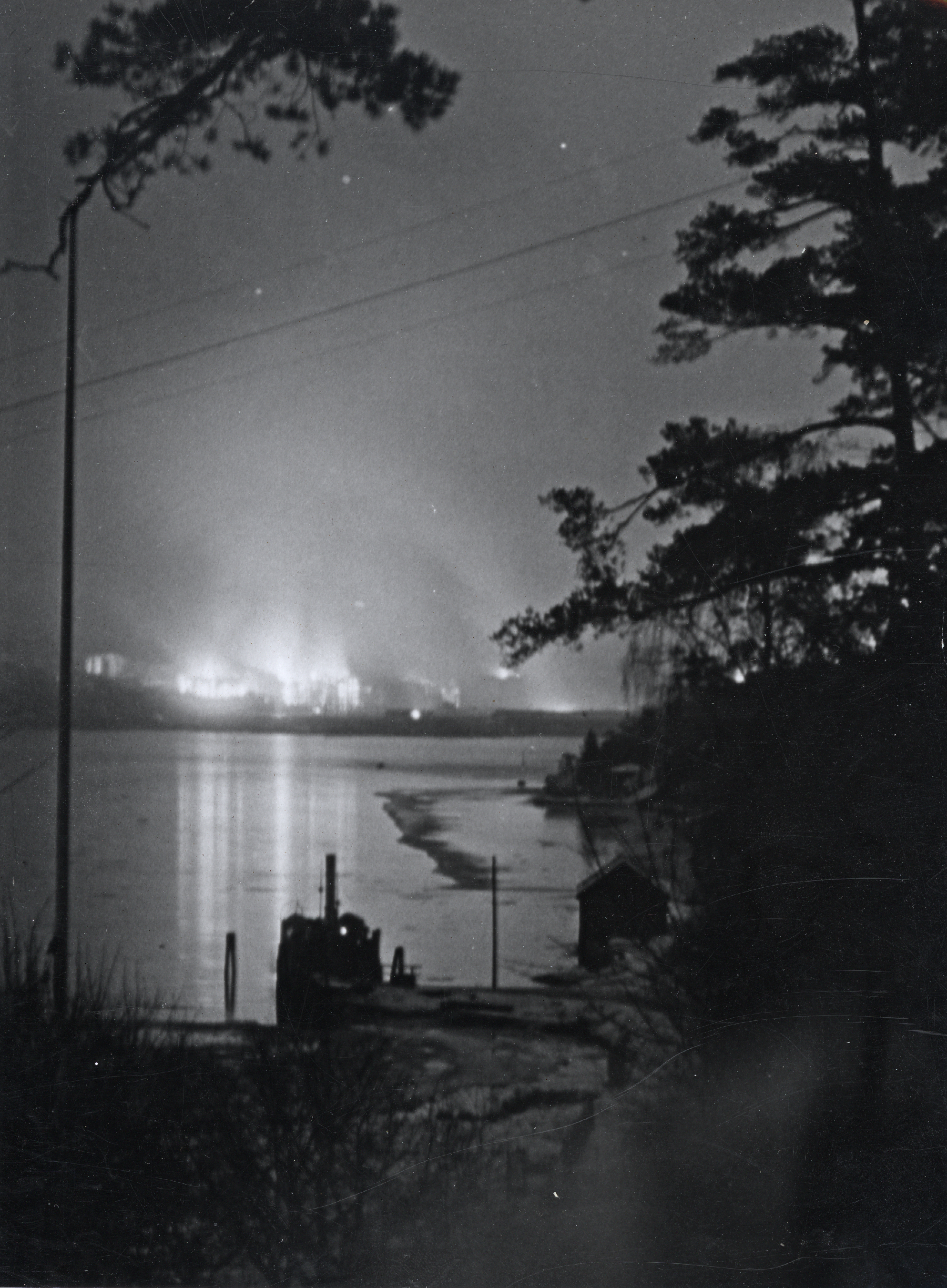
Filipstad explosion

The 1943 Filipstad explosion was a fire in an ammunition store at Filipstad in Oslo on Sunday, 19 December 1943, during the occupation of Norway by Nazi Germany. The fire started during the unloading of ammunition from the transport ship Selma. The estimated amount of exploded ammunition varies from 800 to 1,200 tons. A large number of shells and grenades were tossed into the air and spread over the city. There were around 40 Norwegian casualties and around 75 Germans were killed, and 400 wounded. About 400 buildings were severely damaged.

== Course of events ==
The first explosion occurred at around 14:30 local time, and killed 20 dock workers, two crane operators, several German guards and crew from Selma. Workers that were not killed immediately managed to escape from the area or find shelter among large cement blocks on the wharf. The main explosion occurred two hours later, at around 16:30, when an estimated 400 tons of ammunition exploded within a few seconds, five firefighters were killed and sixteen severely injured. The explosive fire lasted several hours. The dangerous situation was declared over at 21:45 the same night. A nearby coal store of 20,000 tons had been set on fire and burned for three weeks. The ship Selma did not explode during the Filipstad fire. The ship was towed away from Filipstad. It exploded and sank in another explosion on 11 January 1944.

== Damage ==
The fire resulted in a large number of shells and grenades being thrown over Oslo, but most of them did not explode. The Filipstad area was severely damaged by the explosion and resulting fires. An area of about 60 decares was completely destroyed. A disastrous fire developed in the neighbouring districts, which was the largest fire in Oslo since the establishment of a permanent fire brigade in 1861. Around 350 firefighters from Oslo and 60 from Aker participated in the firefighting operations. Pressure waves resulted in glass being damaged in large areas of Oslo and Aker. According to the city architect, the amount of shattered glass was 53,000 square metres in residential houses, 28,000 square metres in offices and shops, and 9,000 square metres in public buildings such as hospitals and schools. The total amount of shattered glass was 90,000 square metres spread over 1,600 premises. The effect of the explosion was felt as far the southern part of Nordmarka, where the windows of Skjennungstua were shattered.

Norwegian painter Edvard Munch, whose house was partially damaged by the explosions, witnessed how the resulting conflagration unusually illuminated the night sky which he captured in his painting Explosion. In observing and painting the scene on a cold, wet night, the 80 year old artist succumbed to a respiratory illness and died the following month.

== Cause ==
After investigations by the German occupation authorities, the incident was declared to be an accident. It has been speculated whether the cause could have been sabotage, but no organization or person has claimed responsibility.
