= Argillaceous schist =

Argillaceous schist is metamorphic rock which exhibits fine laminations of clay materials. Its protolith is argillite.

== See also ==
- Pelite
