= Schafteløkken =

Building in Oslo, Norway

Coordinates: 59°55′15.089″N 10°42′10.958″E

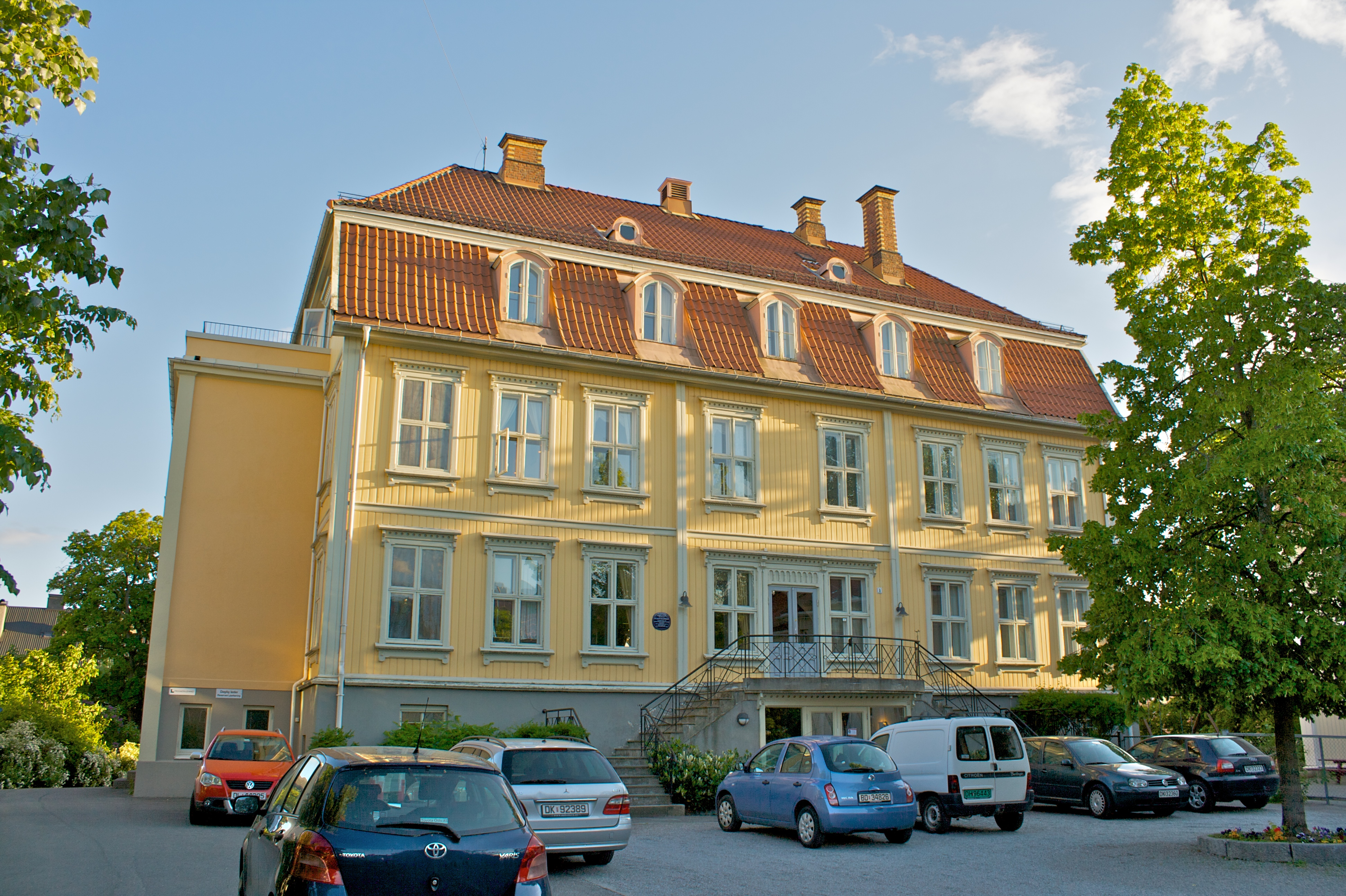
Schafteløkken.

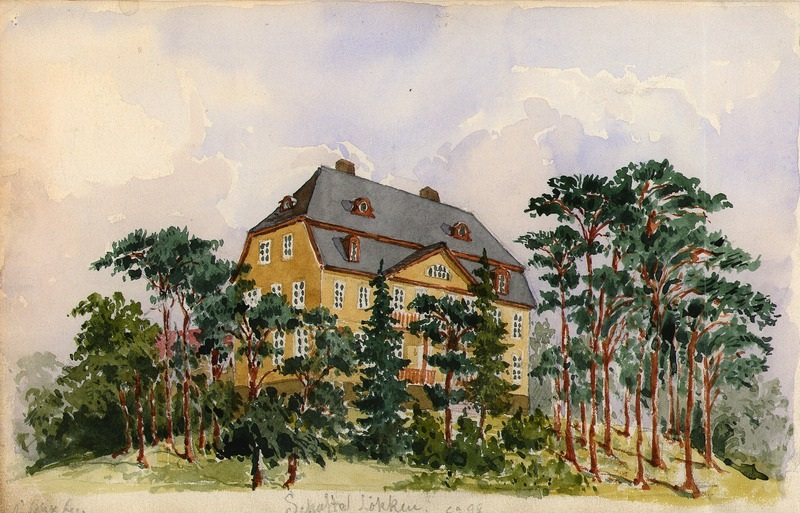
Schafteløkken Peter Andreas Blix (1898)

Schafteløkken is a building in the neighborhood Elisenberg in the Frogner borough in Oslo, Norway. It is preserved, and mainly used for weddings and other official ceremonials.

It is one of the largest existing wooden building in Oslo, Norway. It was built around 1807 for Andreas Schaft, who had bought the square in front of the building in 1799. He named the square Elisenberg, after his daughter Martine Elisabeth.

Fredrik Glad Balchen (1815–1899) bought Schafteløkken in 1858 and operated Christiania Døvstumme-Institut, a school for the deaf, on site until 1891. Frogner parish bought the buildings in 1910. The site became the parish's retirement home until 1958. Oslo City Council decided in 1985 to preserve Schafteløkken, after efforts from an action group led by architect Ole Daniel Bruun (1933-2014).
