= Olav Kyrres plass =

Square and area in Oslo, Norway

Coordinates: 59.919228°N 10.69485°E

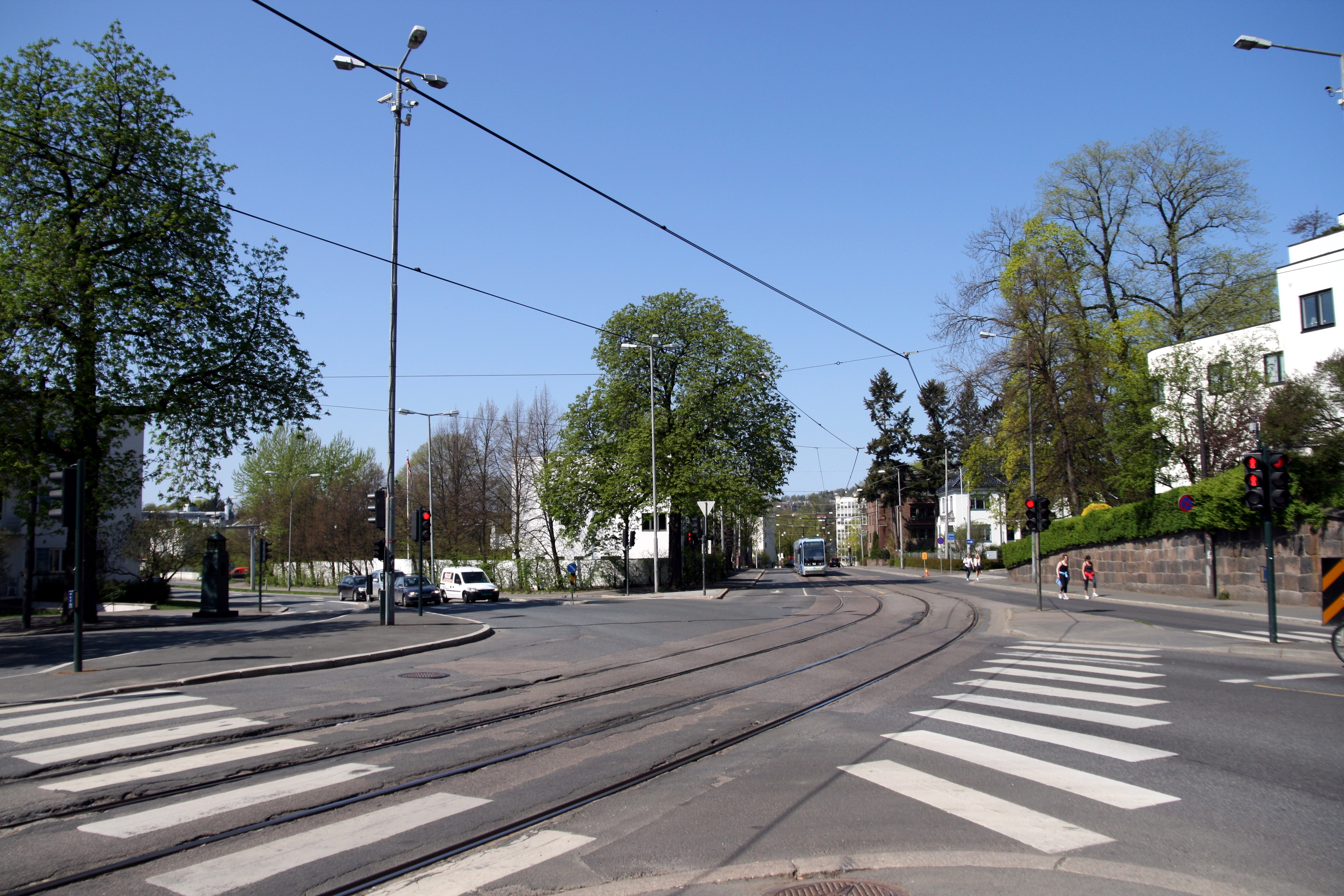
The Skøyen Line of the Oslo Tramway follows Drammensveien, which intersects with Bygdøy allé at Olav Kyrres plass

Olav Kyrres plass is a square and area in Frogner in Oslo, Norway. The area centered on the intersection between Drammensveien and Bygdøy allé. It is named for King Olav Kyrre.
