= Oslo West Station =

Former railway station in Oslo, Norway

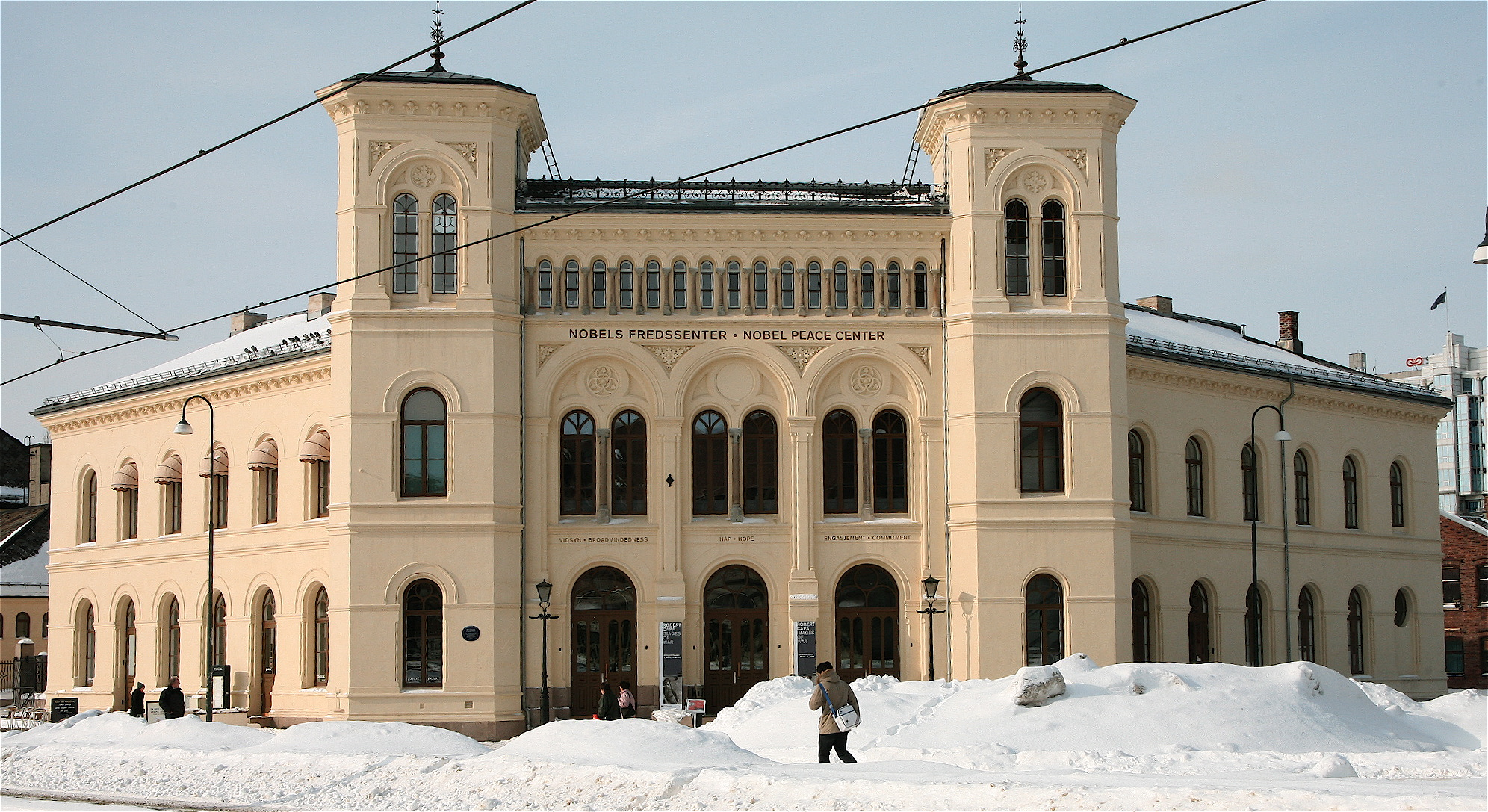

General information
- Location: Aker Brygge, Oslo; Norway
- Coordinates: 59°54′42″N 10°43′50″E
- Owner: Norwegian State Railways
- Lines: Skøyen–Filipstad Line (1980–89); Drammen Line (1872-1980); Oslo Port Line (1907–83)
- Platforms: 4

Construction
- Architect: Georg Andreas Bull

History
- Opened: 1872
- Closed: 1989
Location

Oslo West Station (Norwegian: Oslo Vestbanestasjon) or Oslo V, is a former railway station located in Vika in Oslo, Norway. It was the terminus of the Drammen Line between 1872 and 1980, until the Oslo Tunnel opened. The station remained in use until 1989, when all traffic was moved to the new Oslo Central Station. Until its closure it was the main station for trains on the Sørland Line, the Drammen Line and the Vestfold Line. There was no passenger rail connection to Oslo Ø, the eastern station that served the eastern lines and trains to Bergen. The only connection was the Oslo Port Line that went partially through some of the most trafficked streets in Oslo.

The station building was designed by architect Georg Andreas Bull in the then-fashionable Italiante style and built of plastered brickwork. The facade against City Hall Square is flanked by two low towers. Windows and doors are arched. After the station closed, the building was used by, among others, the Nobel Peace Center.

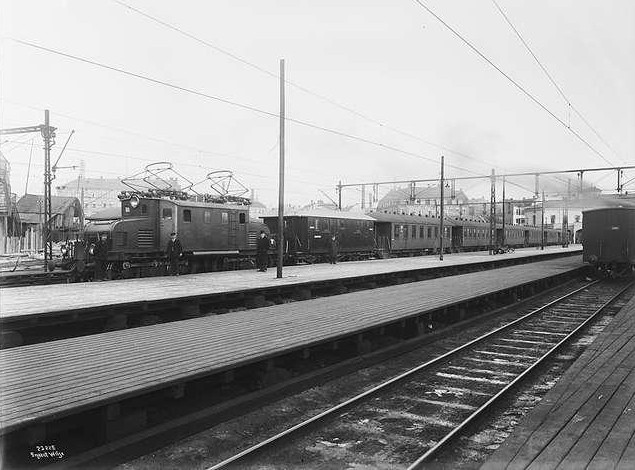
Oslo V in 1922, just after electrification; train hauled by NSB El 1

On 13 April 1921, the restaurant was taken over by Norsk Spisevognselskap, after it had received a renovation, which was completed on 1 May. In 1922, the company and Narvesen opened two kiosks at the station. After the station was partially destroyed on 2 February 1942, it remained closed until 1 June.

Preceding station		Following station
Skarpsno	Drammen Line	—
—	Oslo Port Line	Oslo Ø
