= Elisenberg tram stop =

Tram stop in Oslo, Norway

Elisenberg
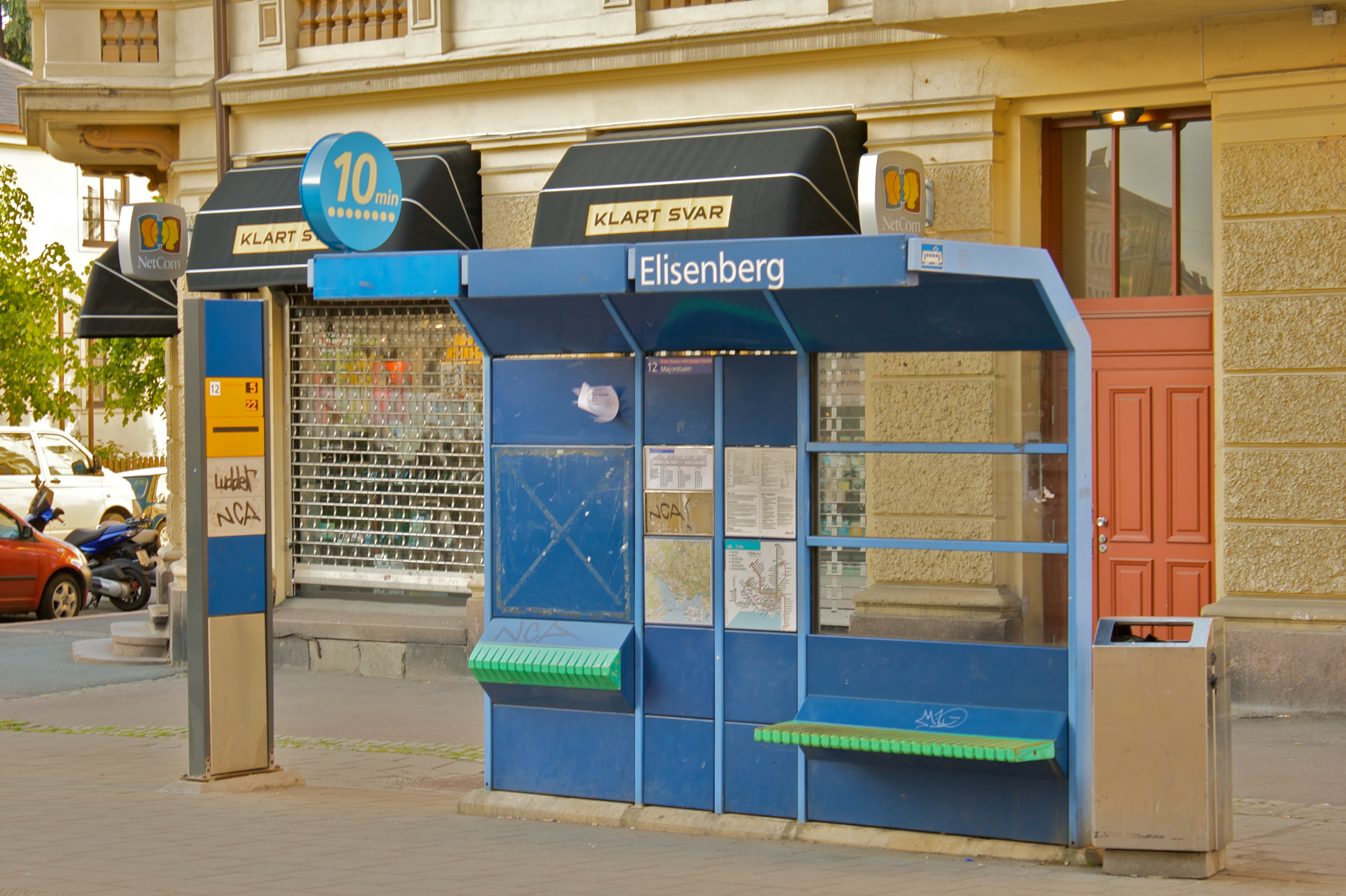
- The blue Oslo Tramway shed by Arne Henriksen

General information
- Location: Elisenberg, Frogner, Oslo; Norway
- Coordinates: 59°55′10″N 10°42′31″E
- Line: Frogner Line

History
- Opened: 1902
Location

Elisenberg is a tram stop on the Oslo Tramway.

Located at Elisenberg in Frogner, the tram stop was opened by Kristiania Elektriske Sporvei in 1902 as part of the Frogner Line which ran between Majorstuen and Frogner. Today, it is served by line 12, which operates between Majorstuen and Kjelsås.

An underground mainline railway station named Elisenberg was planned to be built 30 metres (98 ft) underneath the tram stop, but the project was never completed and the station was never opened to traffic.

Preceding station	Trams in Oslo	Following station
Frogner plass towards Majorstuen	Line 12	Lille Frogner allé towards Kjelsås
