= Vika, Oslo =

Neighborhood in central Oslo, Norway

Coordinates: 59.9114°N 10.7314°E

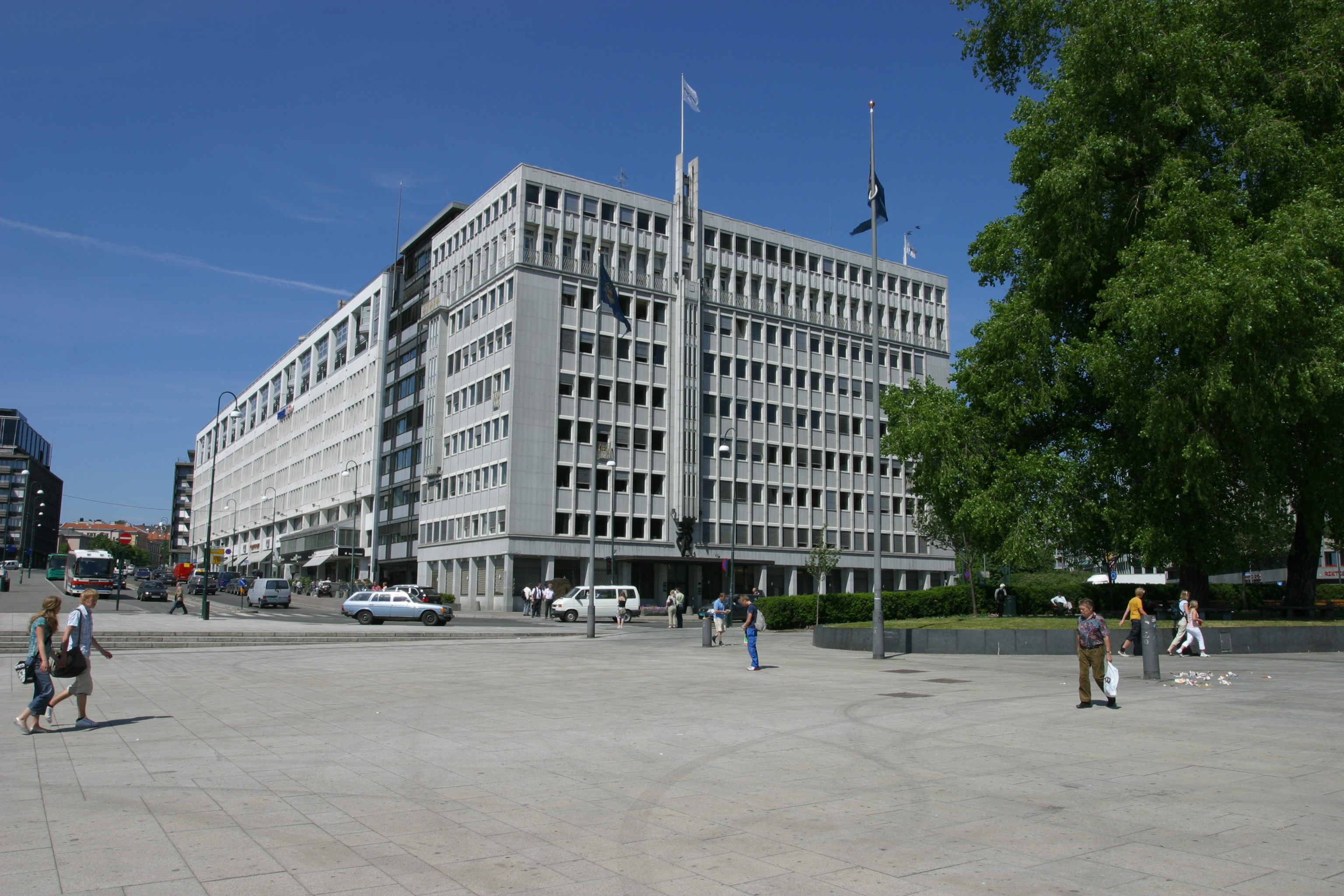
Dronning Mauds gate

Vika is a neighborhood in the Oslo city center in Norway. It is located between the Royal Palace, Oslo, Oslofjord, Aker Brygge, Pipervika, Slottsparken, Oslo City Hall, Oslo Concert Hall and borders on the north with Karl Johans gate, the main street of the city of Oslo which hosts Norwegian Parliament Building as well as known for being the hub to major Scandinavian brands, bars and hotels including Grand Hotel, the annual venue of the winner of Nobel Peace Prize and various state dignitaries.

Vika is home to historical architectural monuments such as Victoria Terrasse. The new building for Norway's National Museum of Art, Architecture and Design, which is the largest art museum in the Nordic region and host to exclusive collection of world renowned artists such as Edvard Munch, is in the same vicinity. Vika falls within Frogner administrative district of Oslo which is deemed as one of city's most expensive, upscale and exclusive neighborhood with a handful of period properties. Over the years, several residential properties have been occupied by various embassies, high end restaurants and art galleries.

The area is dominated by public institutions, such as the Norwegian Ministry of Foreign Affairs, Oslo City Hall and the Embassy of the United States in Oslo. There are also a number of cultural institutions, such as the Nobel Peace Center and Oslo Concert Hall while the National Theatre (Oslo) is also within a short walking distance . Vika was also the location of the former Western Railway Station. The Vika Line of the Oslo Tramway runs through the area.
