= Filipstad, Norway =

Neighborhood in Oslo, Norway

Coordinates: 59.9083°N 10.7148°E

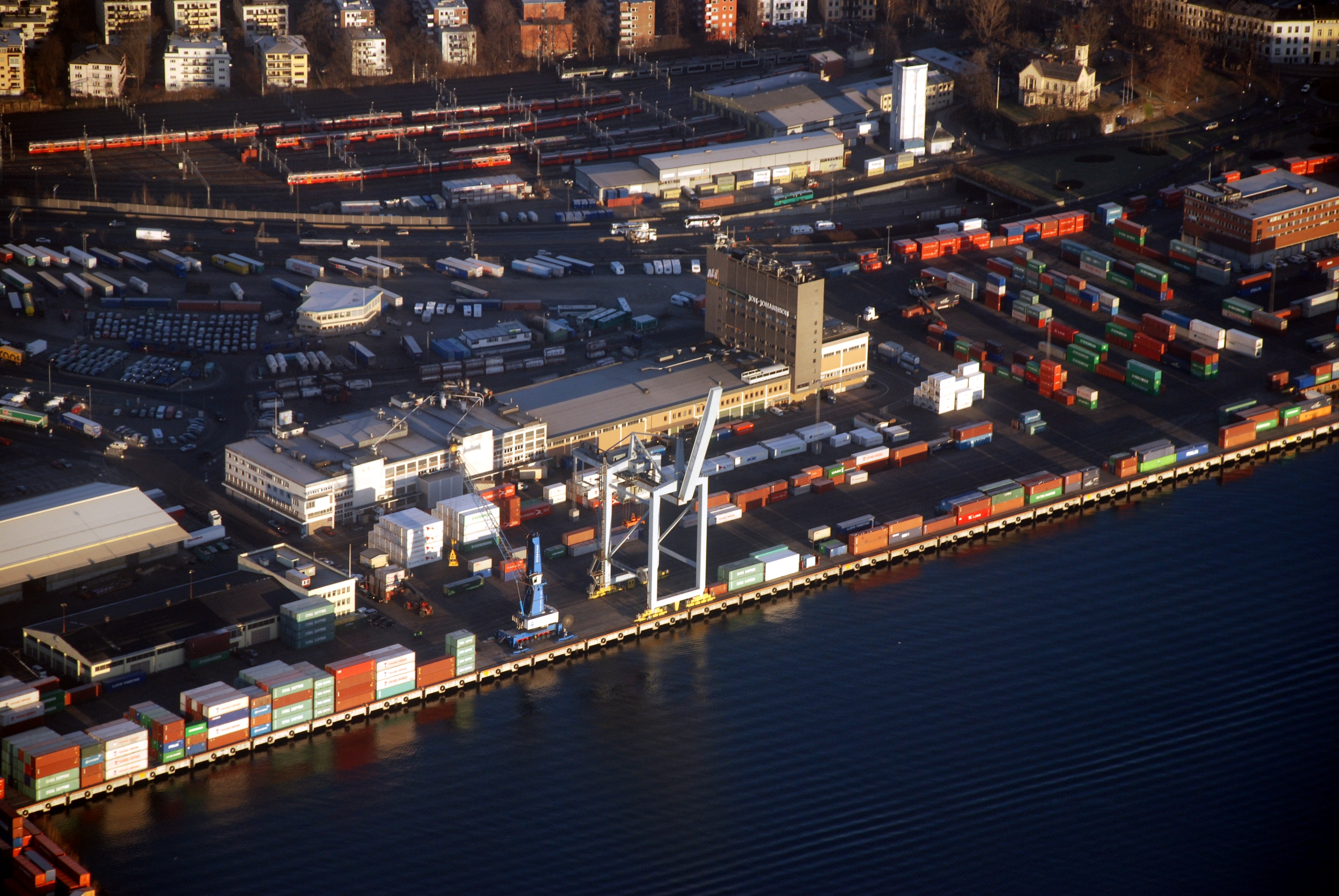
The container port

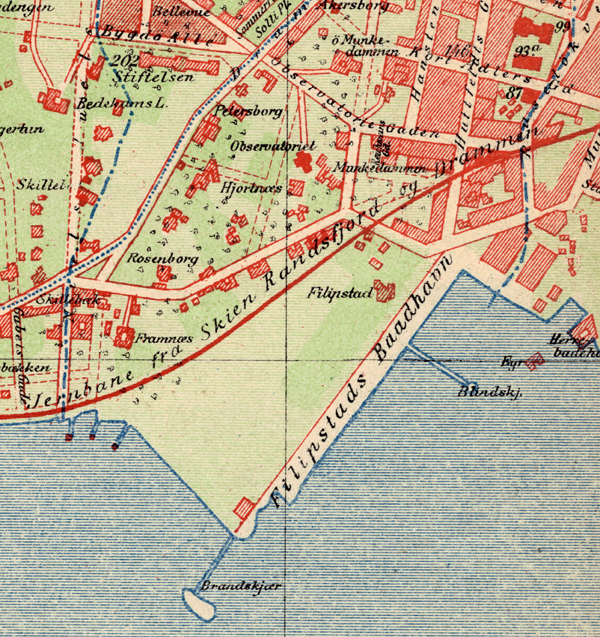
The neighborhood, about 1900.

Filipstad is a neighborhood in the Frogner borough in Oslo, Norway. It serves both as a major container port and ferry terminal for the city. The Oslo-Kiel ferry docks by the Hjortneskaia at Filipstad.

== History ==
The neighborhood grew from a single property Philipsborg, named after the pharmacist Philip Moth, around 1650. From 1805 the property belonged to the Heftye family. The villa at the site dates from 1864 and was initiated by banker Jørgen H. Heftye who commissioned the famous architect G. A. Bull for its design. The property is now represented with the mentioned building Villa Filipstad at the address Munkedamsveien 62.

The former Filipstad inlet (between Tjuvholmen and Munkedamsveien) used to serve as a place for bathing, but the water was contaminated by the Filipstad stream. From around 1870 the inlet was gradually filled in to serve as a future port.

When the Norwegian State Railways bought the area in 1909, the villa was made the residence of the company's director. After the takeover by the State the area was seriously converted into a port. In 1943 the Filipstad Accident took place here. The Drammen Line went through the area until 1980, after which it is served by the Skøyen–Filipstad Line.

The neighboring area Aker Brygge, a former ship yard, went through an urban renewal in the 1980s.

== The Fjord City ==
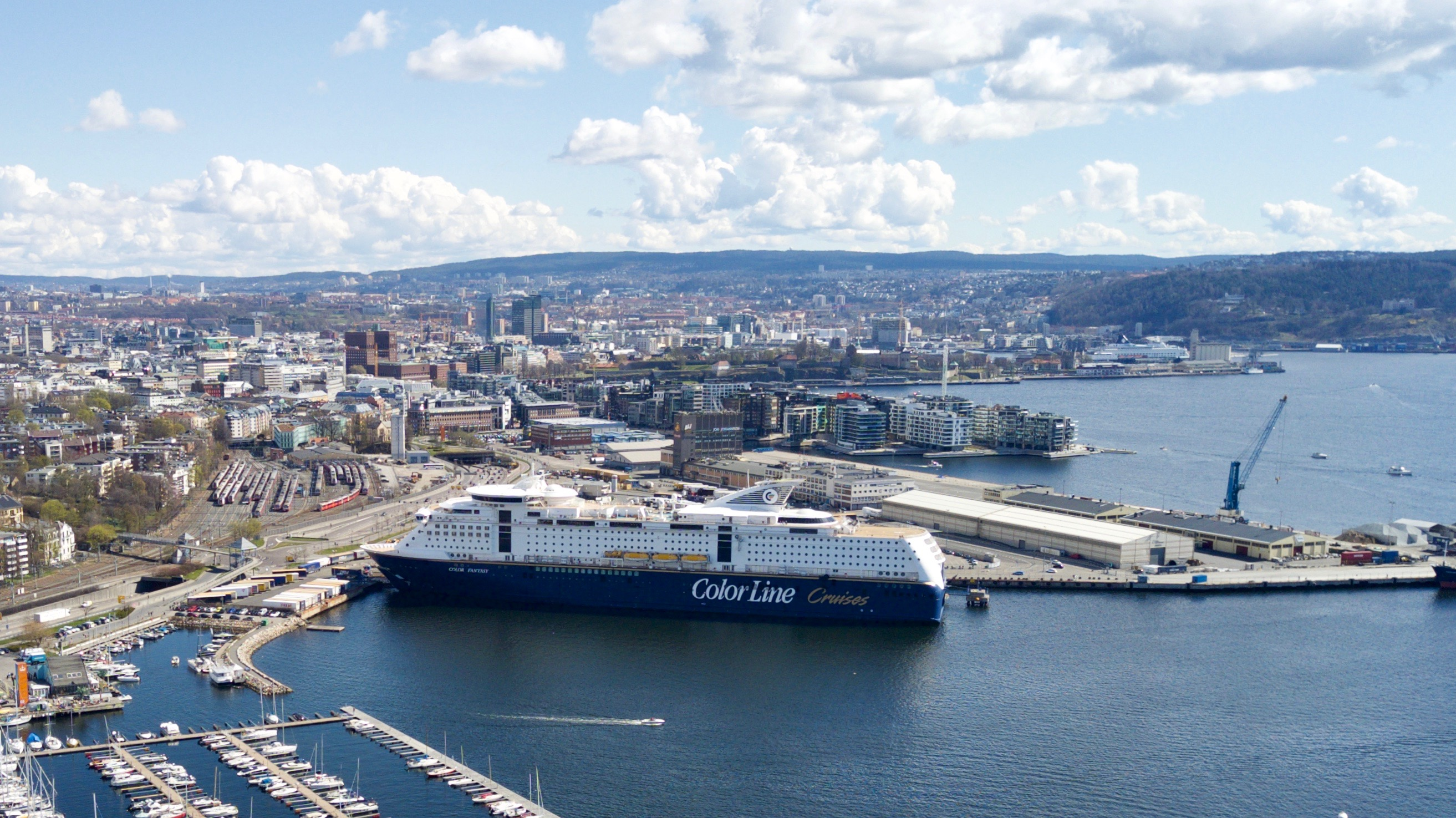
MS Color Fantasy of Color Line in port at Fillipstad

Due to the central location of Filipstad it has been suggested, in the urban renewal project The Fjord City, to convert the container port into a new urban area similar to Akerbrygge and Tjuvholmen. The Color Line cruiseferry terminal is presumed to be kept.

The almost 40-meter-tall (130 ft) landmark building of Filipstad, the Ali Coffee roasting factory, owned by the Joh. Johannson company, is scheduled to close down in the year 2020 when the business will be relocate to new facilities outside Oslo.

The two largest landowners of Filipstad are Oslo Port Authority and Bane NOR owned Bane NOR Eiendom. In addition the Norwegian Public Roads Administration is the owner of the E18 motorway. It is disputed what to do about the traffic situation of E18 and how the outcome of this issue will influence on the Fjord City development of Filipstad.

== The name ==
The area is named after the pharmacist Philip Moth who owned the property around 1650 and used it as a herb garden. The last element is stad 'property; farm'.
