= List of disused Oslo Metro stations =

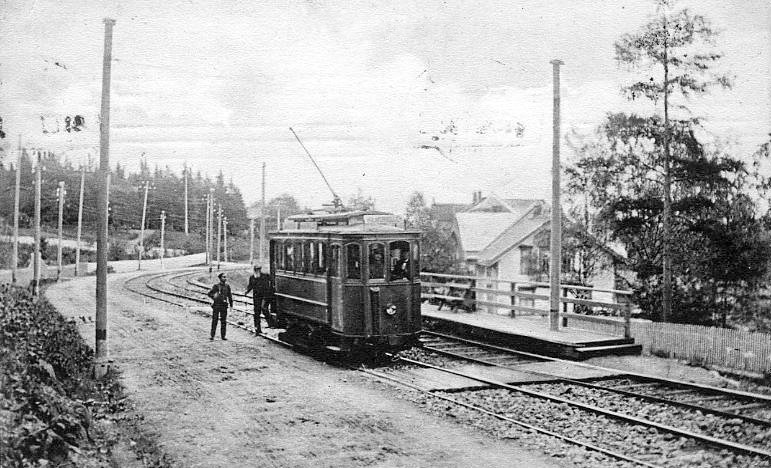
Engerjordet was the first station to be closed

The Oslo Metro is a metro system that serves Oslo and Bærum in Norway. There are in total 73 stations in service, 17 temporarily inoperational and 16 that are disused. All of the 16 disused stations that were closed between 1935 and 2006 are located in the West End of Oslo. The first station to be closed was Engerjordet, which was taken out of use in 1935 because it had too few passengers to make its retention feasible. In the 1990s, several stations on the Røa and Sognsvann Lines were closed, following the upgrade of the lines from light rail to rapid transit standard. (Note: This involved replacing overhead wires with third rail.)

== Stations ==
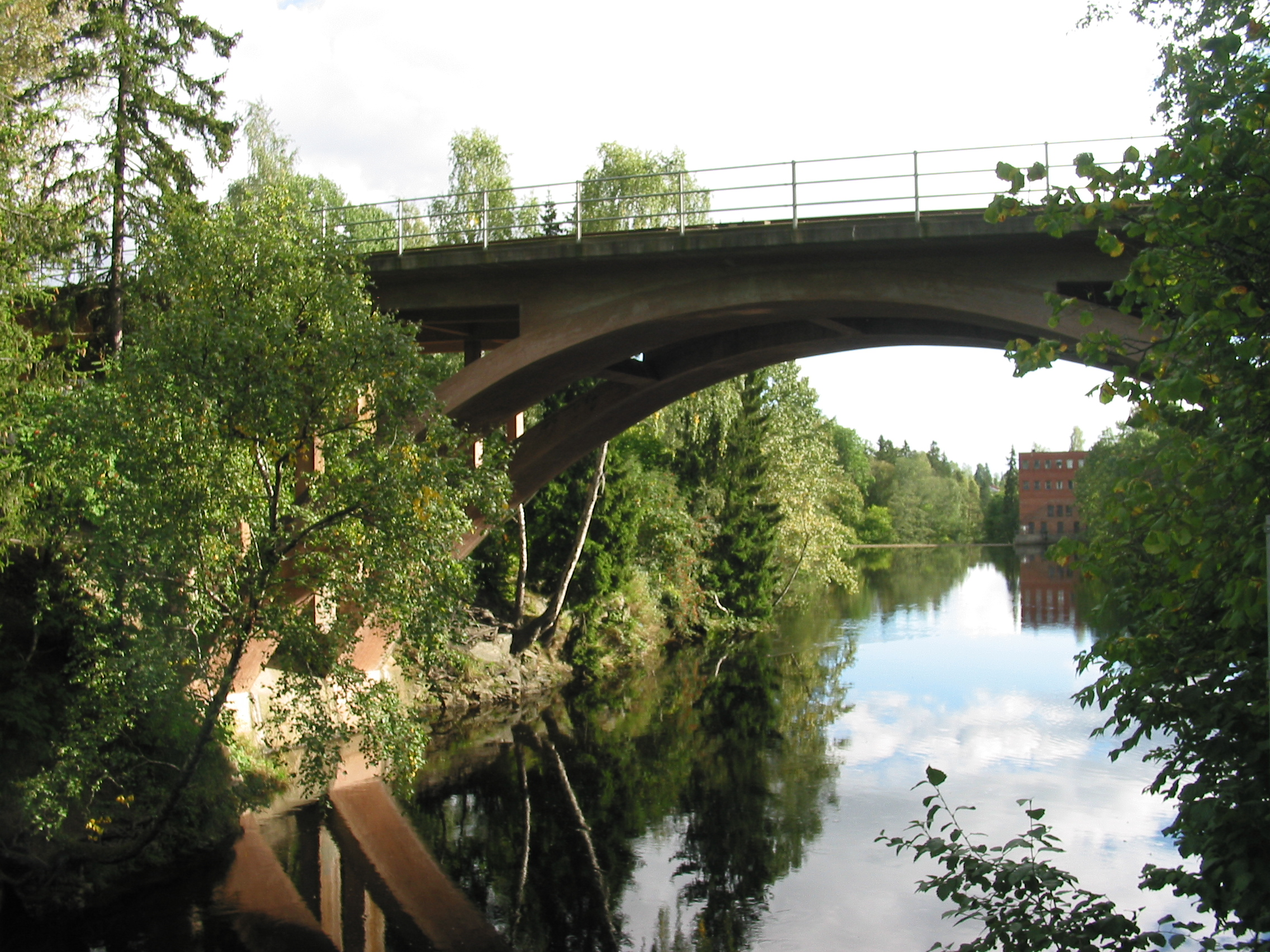
The Røa Line bridge over Grinidammen.

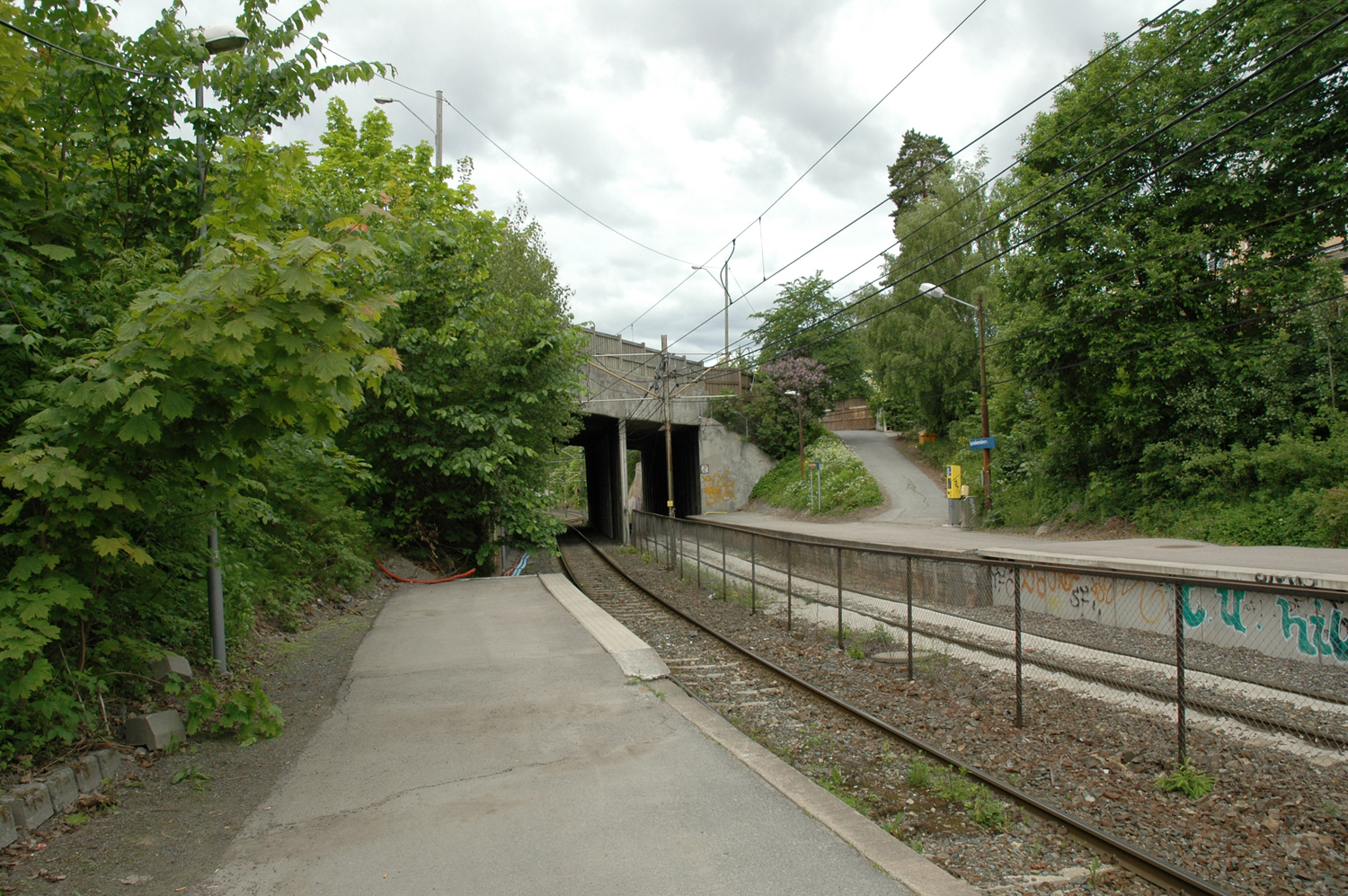
Lysakerelven

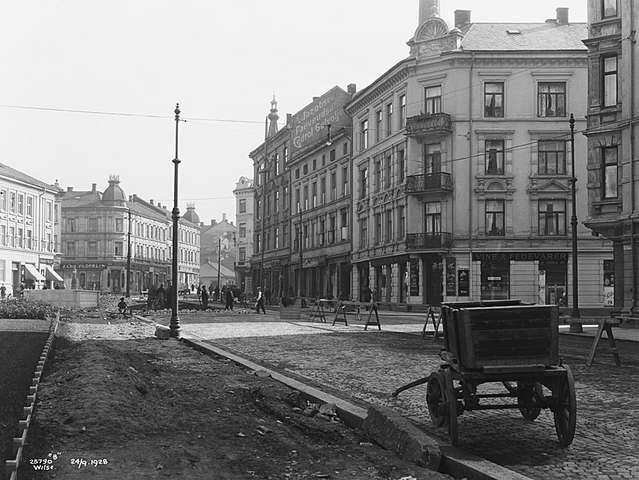
Valkyrie plass in 1928.

The following table lists the name of each station, the line the station is located on, the opening and closure date, and the distance from Stortinget. It also lists the grade, which informs whether the station is underground, built-in or above ground (at-grade). Note that some of the stations have been rebuilt under the same name in different locations.

Station	Line	Opened	Closed	Distance	Grade	Ref(s)
Bjørnsletta	Kolsås	1942	2006	7.8 km (4.8 mi)	At-grade	
Egne hjem	Kolsås	1924	2006	10.8 km (6.7 mi)	At-grade	
Engerjordet	Holmenkoll	1905	1935	5.7 km (3.5 mi)	At-grade	
Grini	Røa	1948	1995	8.4 km (5.2 mi)	At-grade	
Heggeli	Røa	1912	1995	4.2 km (2.6 mi)	At-grade	
Huseby skole	Røa	1935	1995	7.0 km (4.3 mi)	At-grade	
Husebybakken	Kolsås	2006	2008	5.5 km (3.4 mi)	At-grade	(Note: Husebybakken was constructed to serve as a contemporary station on the Kolsås Line from 2006 to 2008.)
Lysakerelven	Kolsås	1942	2006	8.4 km (5.2 mi)	At-grade	
Merradalen	Kolsås	1942	1957	6.4 km (4.0 mi)	At-grade	
Nordberg	Sognsvann	1934	1992	7.6 km (4.7 mi)	At-grade	
Ringstabekk	Kolsås	1924	2006	10.5 km (6.5 mi)	At-grade	
Sørbyhaugen	Røa	1935	1995	5.1 km (3.2 mi)	At-grade	
Tjernsrud	Kolsås	1924	2006	9.9 km (6.2 mi)	At-grade	(Note: Tjernsrud was closed for upgrades in 1 July 2006, and demolished 15 February 2009. The station was served by the line 13 of the Oslo Tramway in the meantime from 20 August 2007.)
Valkyrie plass	Common	1928	1985	2.4 km (1.5 mi)	Underground	
Vestgrensa	Sognsvann	1934	1999	4.7 km (2.9 mi)	At-grade	
Volvat	Røa	1936	1997	3.4 km (2.1 mi)	Underground	

== See also ==
- List of disused Oslo Tramway stations
