= Bærumsbanen =

Tram company

A/S Bærumsbanen
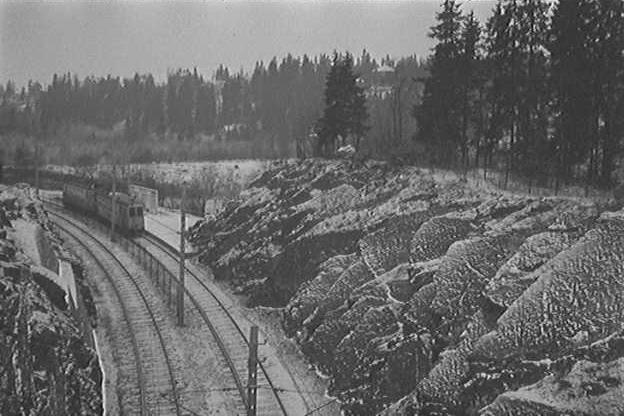
- Bærumsbanen tram at Jar in 1935
- Native name: A/S Kristiania Elektriske Sporvei Bærumsbanen
- Industry: Rail transport
- Predecessors: Kristiania Sporveisselskab; Kristiania Elektriske Sporvei
- Founded: 1924 in Oslo, Norway
- Defunct: 1 July 1971; 53 years ago
- Fate: Merger with Oslo Sporveier
- Area served: Oslo, Norway
- Owner: Oslo Sporveier

A/S Bærumsbanen was a tram company that operated the Lillaker-, Kolsås and Østensjø Line of the Oslo Tramway, Norway, from 1924 to 1971 when the company became part of Oslo Sporveier.

== History ==
In 1924 the two street tram operators in Oslo, Kristiania Sporveisselskab and Kristiania Elektriske Sporvei, were taken over by the municipal owned Oslo Sporveier. The final part of the Skøyen Line, from Skøyen to Lillaker was a suburban tramway located in the neighboring municipality of Aker, and the Municipality of Oslo was not interested in taking over it. Therefore the owner reorganized itself to A/S Kristiania Elektriske Sporvei Bærumsbanen (KES-BB), though changing their name to just A/S Bærumsbanen in 1935 after Oslo Sporveier bought 25% of the company on 1 October 1934.

The new company immediately started expanding the Lilleaker Line, first to Bekkestua and then to Haslum—establishing a depot at Avløs at the same time. The final extension of the line occurred on 1 January 1930 to Kolsås. From 4 January 1937 Bærumsbanen took over the operation of the Østensjø Line on the east side of Oslo, that was owned by the municipal Akersbanerne—allowing the company to operate through services from Oppsal to Kolsås.

To shorten travel time on the outer part of the Lilleaker Line, the company received permission in 1938 build a line from Jar to Sørbyhaugen on the Røa Line, allowing the trains to use the Common Tunnel shared by the other suburban lines in the west to quickly reach the city center at the underground station at Nationaltheatret. This opened on 15 June 1942—at the same time the Oppsal route was limited to running to Jar. On 1 October 1944 Oslo Sporveier bought the whole company, but not until 1 July 1971 did they fully merge.
