= Levre =

District of Bærum, Norway

Coordinates: 59°54′22″N 10°30′55″E

Levre is a district in the municipality of Bærum, Norway. Its population as of 2007 was 5,368.

It is served by the rail station Gjettum on the Kolsås Line.
