= Ringstabekk =

District of Bærum, Norway

Coordinates: 59.9168°N 10.5952°E

Ringstabekk is a district in Bærum, Norway. Named after the local farm, the district is also known for its schools and the sports field. The sports club Stabæk IF originates in the area.

== The farm ==
The district originates from the farm Øvre Stabæk ('Upper Stabæk'), one of several farms in the Stabekk area. Antiquities from ancient times, such as axes and arrowheads, have been found there. The farm was owned by Hovedøya Monastery before the Reformation of 1536, and thereafter by the Crown. In 1661 it was registered with a private owner, and a series of owners followed until Jens Ring bought the farm in 1839. The farm was renamed Ring-Stabekk, or Ringstabekk, after Jens Ring. In 1826 it had been registered with three horses, ten cattle and twelve sheep.

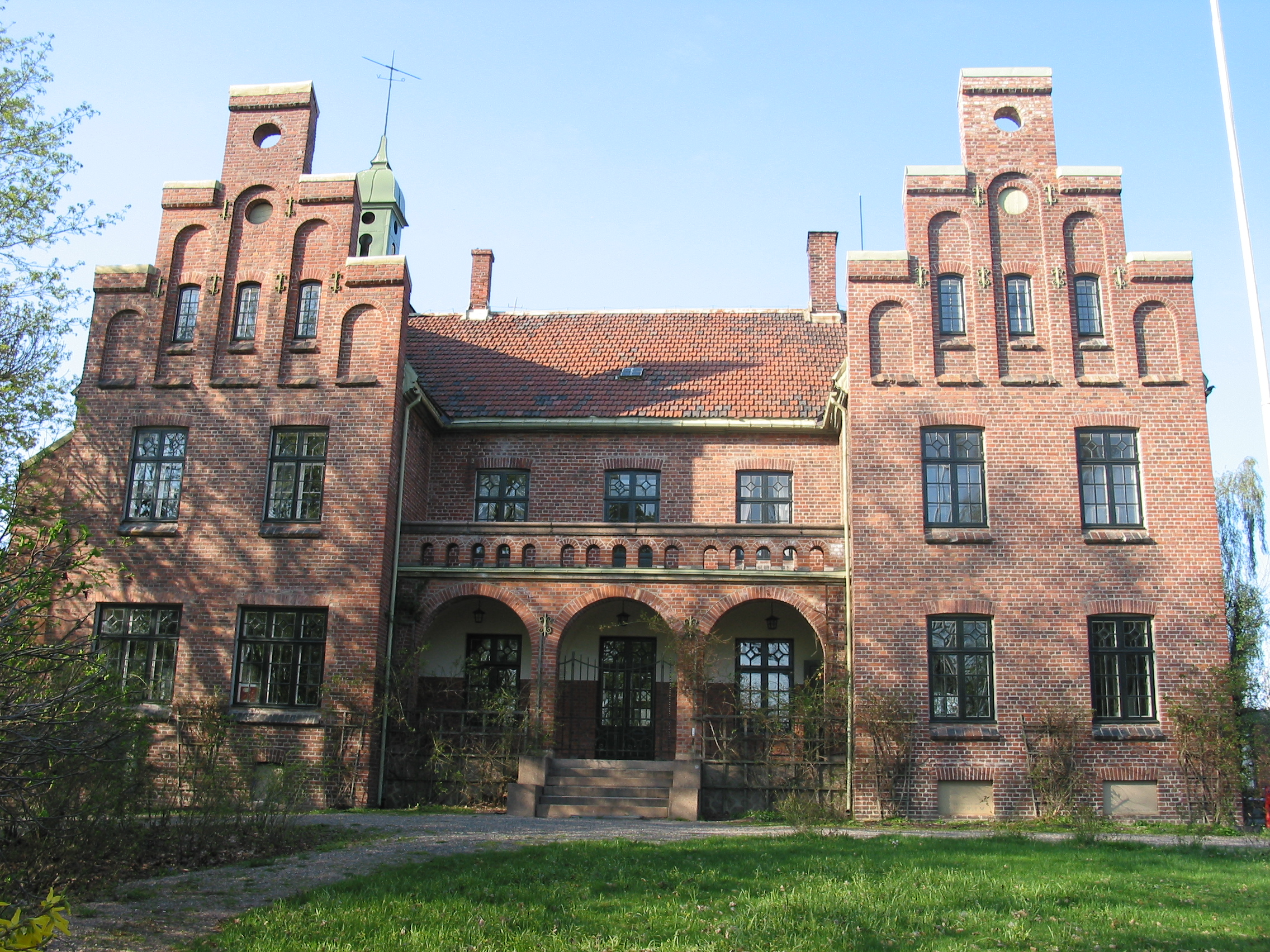
The Castle.

In 1851 Jens Ring was behind the construction of "The Castle", a Neogothic brick building, drawn by architect Heinrich Ernst Schirmer. The Castle was a center of bourgeois social life until Ring's death in 1874. The property was gradually parcelled out, and farming ceased in 1895. The last private owner of The Castle was newspaper editor Ola Thommessen, who in 1909 sold it to the state via Hans Konrad Foosnæs. The Norwegian State College for Domestic Science Teachers was established; and between 1921 and 1924 modern school facilities were added to supplement The Castle. Between 1943 and 1945 the facilities were occupied by forces from the Nazi German Oberkommando der Marine. In 1994 the Akershus University College took over and used the school as one of several campuses spread across Akershus. The campus was closed in 2003 as Akershus University College centralized to Kjeller, and in October the same year the property was declared as preserved by the Norwegian Directorate for Cultural Heritage. It is now used for temporary schooling while other municipal schools are being renovated.

== Later structures ==
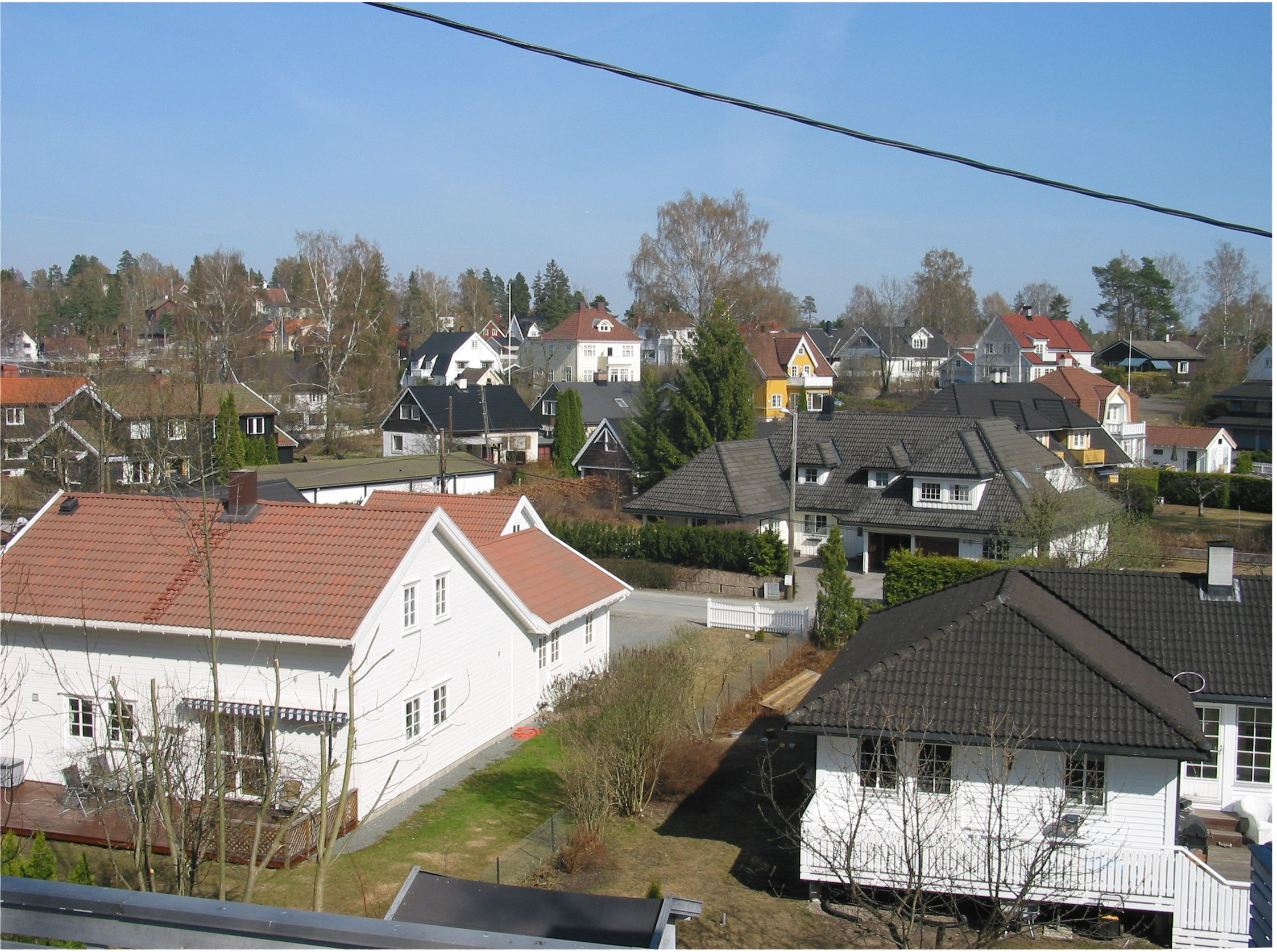
Housing at Ringstabekk.

Most of the development of Ringstabekk as a district took place at Ringstabekkjordet ('The Ringstabekk Field') northeast of the farm. Buildings rose in conjunction with the Bærum Line, which passed through the area. A light rail station named Ringstabekk was opened on 1 July 1924. It was added to the Oslo Metro system in 1942. It was closed on 1 July 2006, reopened as a light rail station on 20 August 2007 but then closed again on 26 February 2009. The station was subsequently demolished, and has since been replaced by New Ringstabekk station, located slightly further east. Western parts of the Ringstabekk district was served by the station Egne hjem, but this station was demolished as well.

The multi-sports club Stabæk IF bought a part of Ringstabekkjordet not long after its March 1912 foundation, and established a sports field. Between 1916 and 1917 a clubhouse was erected; being renewed in 1974. Stabæk IF originally had sections for association football, athletics, skiing and sport shooting, and evolved into a nationally renowned sports club. Sections for bandy, orienteering and handball were added between 1927 and 1945; the shooting, athletics and orienteering sections were later discontinued. Not all sports were practiced at Ringstabekkjordet. The men's football team, Norwegian Premier League champions of 2008, moved its primary activity to Nadderud stadion in 1962. The handball section is based in the same area, whereas the bandy section still plays at Ringstabekkjordet. The sports field is named Stabekkbanen or Plassen, and has hosted matches for the Bandy World Championship.

Adjacent to Stabekkbanen is the local school, Ringstabekk School, a lower secondary school with students in grades eight through ten. It was established in 1972, and became noted for its alternative learning methods. The building was torn down in 2004, and a new school building at the same location was completed in 2005. The new building was noted for its architecture. Also, the primary school Stabekk was built west of the farm in 1906.

In addition to the rail transport, Ringstabekk is served by the Ruter bus network. There are two bus stations named Ringstabekk; one in the southwest, adjacent to the old farm; and one in the northeast, adjacent to the former metro station.
