= Gjettum =

Neighbourhood of Bærum, Norway

Coordinates: 59°54′20″N 10°31′44″E

Gjettum is a neighbourhood in Bærum, Akershus, Norway. It is located south of Kolsås. The area is named after the Gjettum farm.

Gjettum is served by the Gjettum station on the Kolsås Line.

== Mer stoff ==
Artikkelni Store Norske Leksikon
