= Avløs station =

Oslo metro station

Avløs
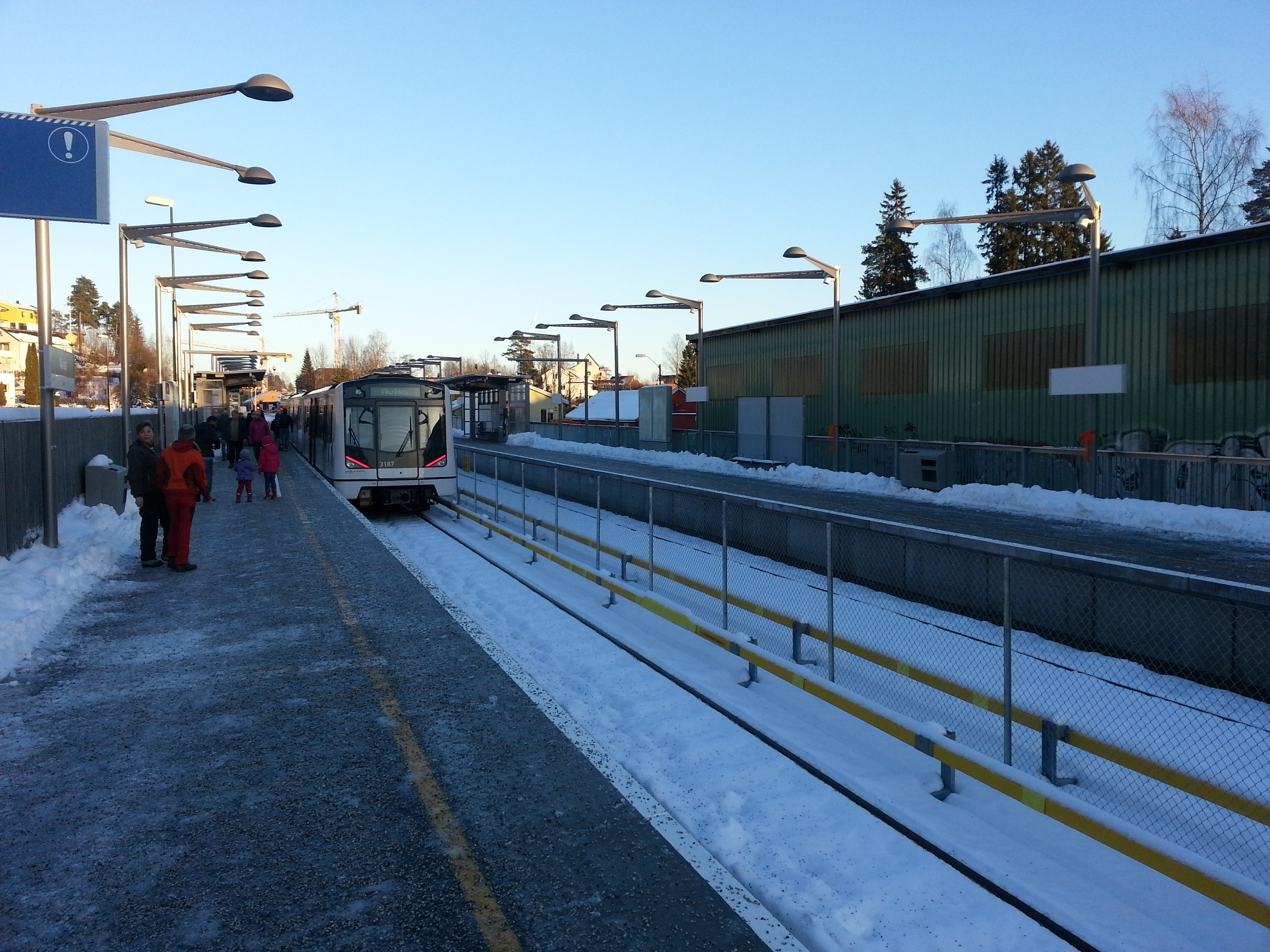
- A MX3000 train at the rebuilt Avløs station, at the day of the official reopening.

General information
- Location: Avløs, Bærum; Norway
- Coordinates: 59°54′52″N 10°33′06″E
- Elevation: 68.5 m (225 ft)
- Owner: Sporveien
- Operator: Sporveien T-banen
- Line: Kolsås Line
- Distance: 13.6 km from Stortinget
- Connections: Bus: 220 Bekkestua - Sandvika

Construction
- Structure type: At-grade
- Parking: Yes
- Cycle facilities: Yes
- Accessible: Yes

History
- Opened: 1 July 1924; 102 years ago 15 December 2013; 12 years ago (reopening)
- Closed: 1 July 2006; 20 years ago (temporarily closed)
- Rebuilt: 15 December 2013; 12 years ago

Services
Preceding station	Oslo Metro	Following station
Gjettum towards Kolsås	Line 3 Kolsås Line	Haslum towards Mortensrud
Location

Avløs is a station on the Kolsås Line (line 3) within the Oslo Metro system. Situated between Valler and Haslum, it is located 13.6 km from Stortinget. The station was originally opened on 1 July 1924 as part of the Lilleaker Line. On 1 July 2006, Avløs, along with most of the line, temporarily closed for upgrades, and bus services were provided as an alternative. As part of the upgrades, Avløs received longer platforms capable of accommodating trains with up to six cars, similar to the majority of the metro system.

The company responsible for public transport in Oslo, Ruter, had the long-term objective of opening the Kolsås Line for Metro use again.

The station reopened on 15 December 2013 and served as the terminus of the Kolsås Line until the line to Kolsås was reopened on 12 October 2014.

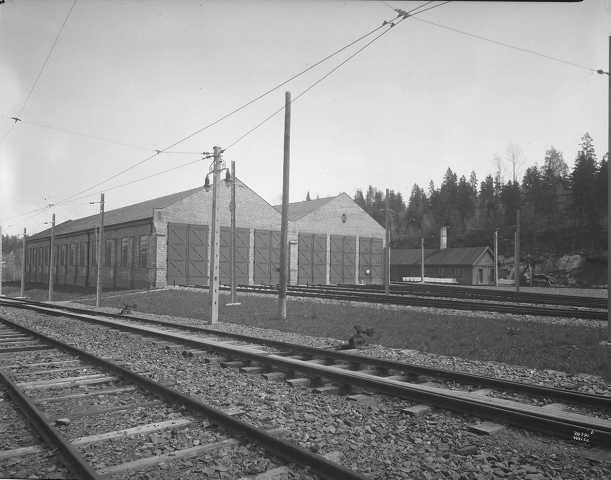
The old depot at Avløs
