= Ringstabekk station =

Oslo metro station

Ringstabekk
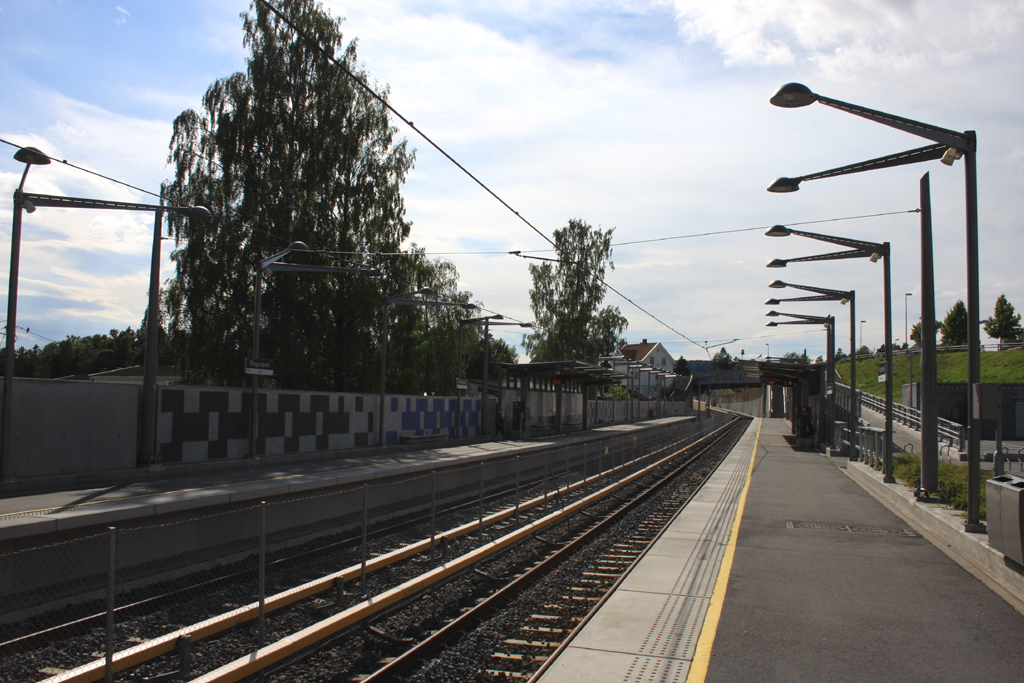

General information
- Location: Ringstabekk, Bærum; Norway
- Coordinates: 59.9201078°N 10.6043817°E
- Owner: Sporveien
- Operator: Sporveien T-banen
- Line: Kolsås Line
- Distance: 10.2 km from Stortinget
- Tracks: 2

Construction
- Structure type: At-grade
- Parking: Yes
- Cycle facilities: Yes
- Accessible: Yes

Other information
- Fare zone: 1

History
- Opened: 15 August 2011; 15 years ago

Services
Preceding station	Oslo Metro	Following station
Bekkestua towards Kolsås	Line 3 Kolsås Line	Jar towards Mortensrud
Location

Ringstabekk is a station on the Kolsås Line (line 2) on the Oslo Metro system. Located in Bærum, Norway, it is between Bekkestua and Jar, 10.2 km west of Stortinget.

The station opened on 15 August 2011 and replaces the former station with the same name and Tjernsrud as part of the upgrade of the Kolsås Line to metro standard.

The station is located at the section of the line where it is shared with the Lilleaker Line used by the Oslo Tramway. However, due to lack of dedicated low-height platforms, trams do not stop at this station.
