= Ringstabekk station (1924–2006) =

Former Oslo metro station

Ringstabekk

General information
- Location: Ringstabekk, Bærum; Norway
- Coordinates: 59.920226°N 10.600648°E
- Elevation: 67.3 m (221 ft)
- Line: Kolsås Line
- Distance: 10.5 km

Construction
- Structure type: At-grade

History
- Opened: 1 July 1924
- Closed: 2006
Location

Ringstabekk was a station on the Kolsås Line (line 2) on the Oslo Metro system and the Oslo Tramway system. It was located in Bærum, between Bekkestua and Tjernsrud stations, 10.5 km west of Stortinget.

The station was opened on 1 July 1924 as part of the tramway, Bærum Line.

Along with most of the line, Ringstabekk was closed for upgrades since 1 July 2006 and its service temporarily provided by tram line 13, as an extension of the service from Jar to Bekkestua. Ringstabekk was never reopened; instead it was torn down in early 2009, and replaced with the New Ringstabekk Station.
