= Tjernsrud (station) =

Former Oslo metro station

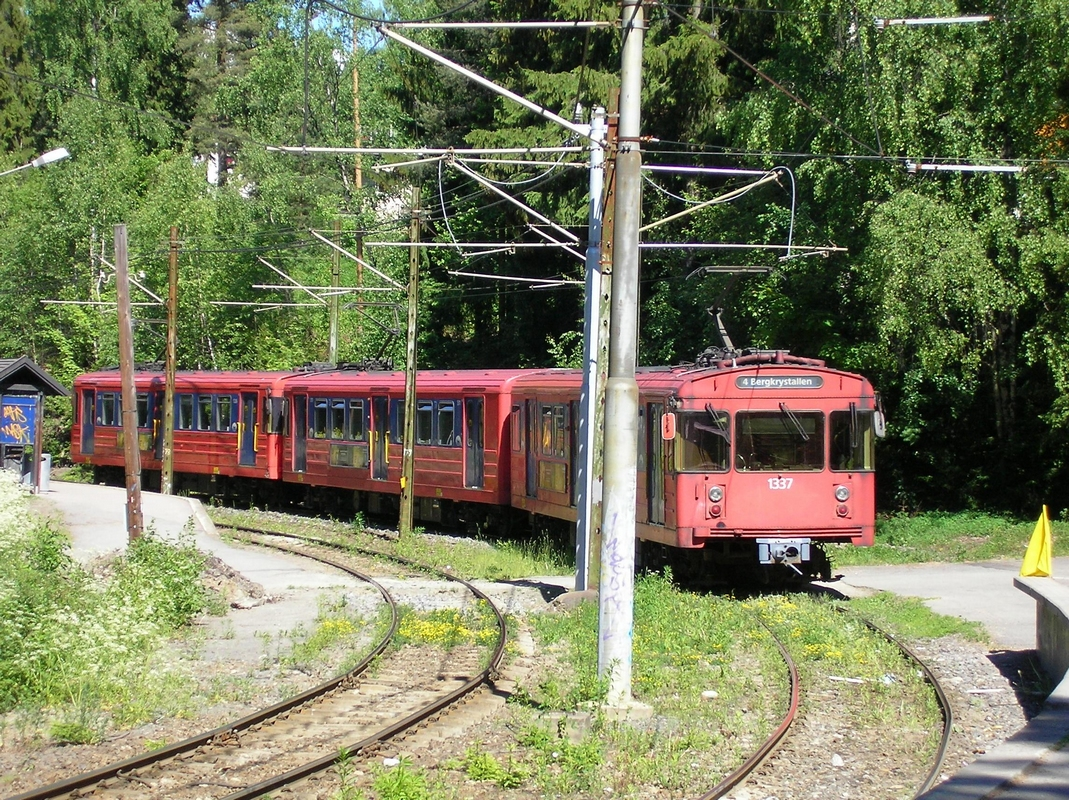
- T1300 train departing Tjernsrud in 2006

General information
- Location: Bærum, Norway
- Coordinates: 59.9208°N 10.6106°E
- Lines: Kolsås Line; Lilleaker Line
- Distance: 9.1 km (5.7 mi)

Construction
- Structure type: At-grade

History
- Opened: 1 July 1924
- Closed: 2009
Location

Tjernsrud was a station on the Kolsås Line (line 6, now Line 3) on the Oslo Metro system. Located in Bærum, Norway, it was between Ringstabekk and Jar, 9.9 km west of Stortinget. It served the neighborhoods of northern Stabekk and southeastern Jar.

The station was opened on 1 July 1924 as part of the tramway Bærum Line.

Along with most of the line, Tjernsrud was closed for upgrades since 1 July 2006. From August 2007 its service was temporarily provided by tram line 13, as an extension of the service from Jar to Bekkestua. It was decided not to reopen Tjernsrud as a metro station, and as the tram service ended in February 2009, it was demolished soon after.

The company responsible for public transport in Oslo, Ruter, has the long-term objective of opening the Kolsås Line for Metro use again.

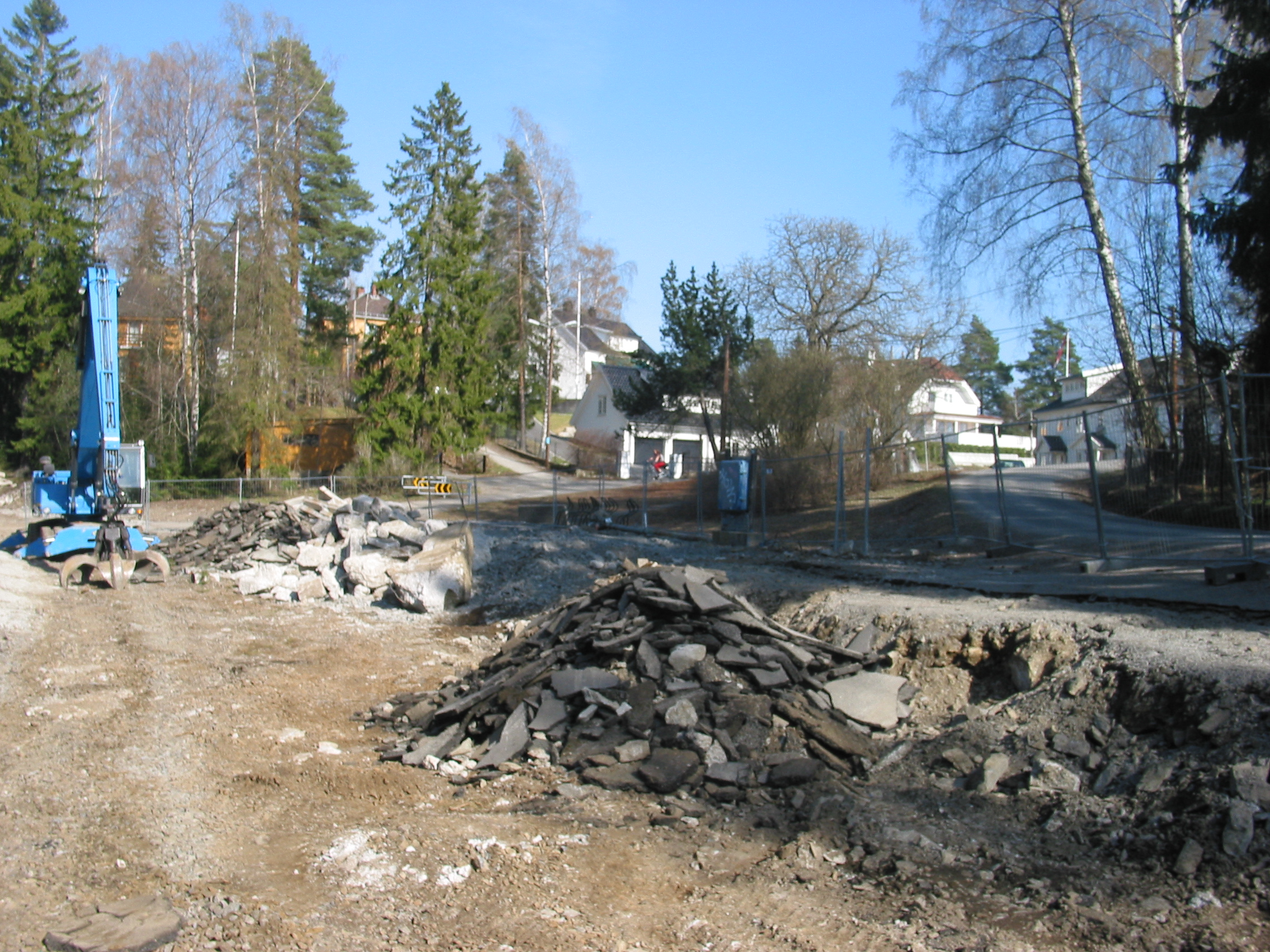
Tjernsrud station in a demolished state, April 2009.
