= Egne hjem station =

Oslo metro station

Egne hjem
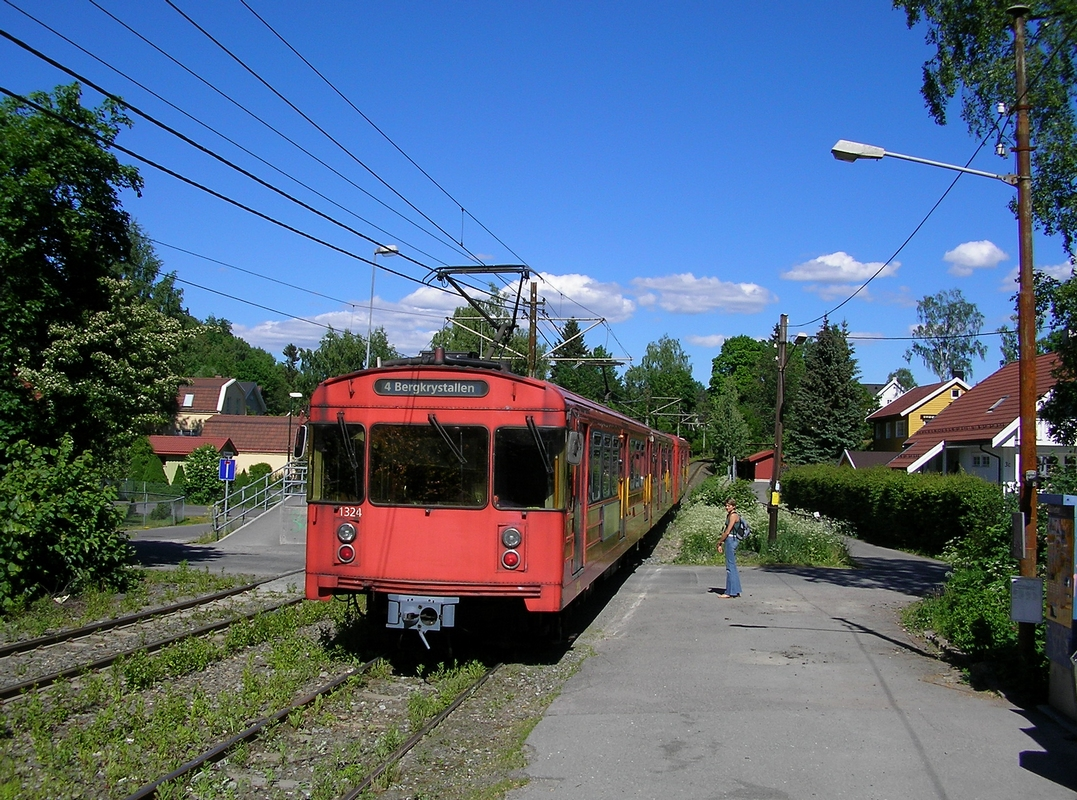
- T1300 train at Egne hjem in 2006

General information
- Location: , Bærum; Norway
- Coordinates: 59.919151°N 10.595412°E
- Line: Kolsås Line
- Distance: 10.8 km (6.7 mi)

Construction
- Structure type: At-grade

History
- Opened: 1 May 1924
- Closed: 1 July 2006
Location

Egne hjem was an Oslo Metro and Oslo Tramway station on the Kolsås Line located in Bærum, Norway. The station was situated between Ringstabekk and Bekkestua, 10.8 kilometres (6.7 mi) from Stortinget.

The station was opened on 3 November 1924. In 2006, it was the least busy station on the Kolsås Line and was located only 300 metres (980 ft) from Ringstabekk and 450 metres (1,480 ft) from Bekkestua. Owing to the low number of passengers and poor location, the station was not reopened following the upgrade of the Kolsås Line.

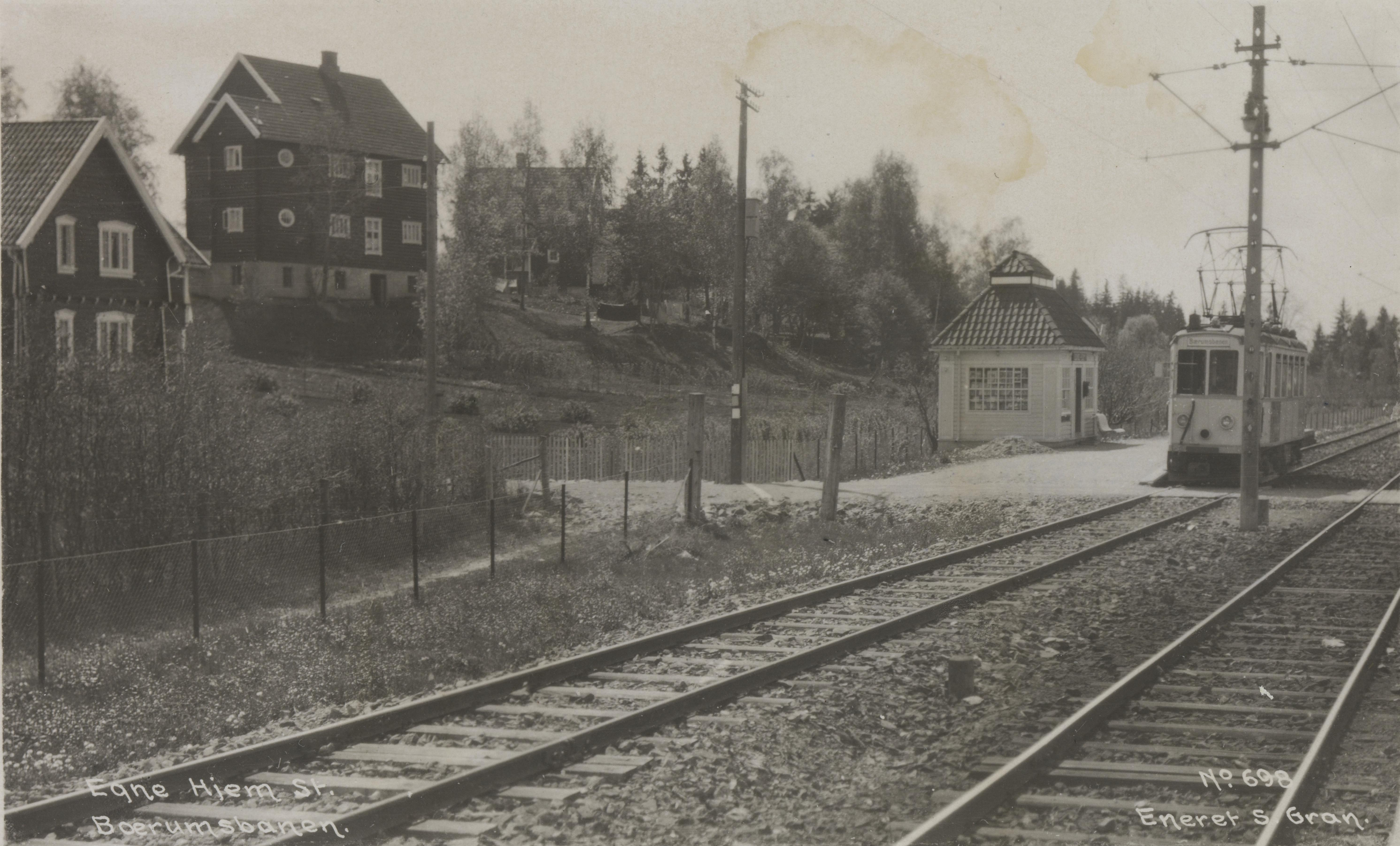
Tram at Egne Hjem

Preceding station	Trams in Oslo	Following station
Bekkestua Terminus	Line 13	Jar towards Ljabru
