= Merradalen (station) =

Railway station in Ullern, Norway

General information
- Location: Ullern, Aker (1935–1948); Ullern, Oslo (1948–); Norway
- Elevation: 82.0 m (269.0 ft)
- Line: Kolsås Line
- Distance: 5.1 km (3.2 mi) from Stortinget

Construction
- Structure type: At-grade

History
- Opened: 15 June 1942
- Closed: 5 July 1957
Location

Merradalen (also Mærradalen) was a station on the Kolsås Line of the Oslo Metro in Norway. It was opened as a station on the branch from Sørbyhaugen to Jar, in 1942. The station was located close to a bridge across the valley with the same name. Merradalen was closed on 5 July 1957 and replaced with Ullernåsen.
