= Gjettum station =

Oslo metro station

Gjettum
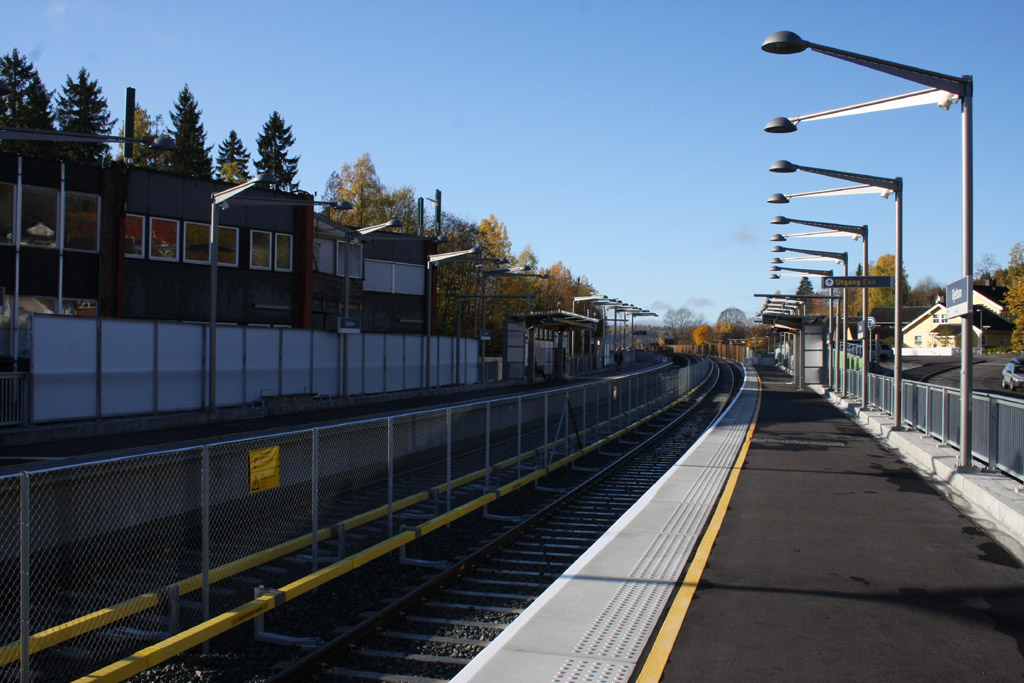

General information
- Location: Bærum; Norway
- Coordinates: 59°54′22″N 10°31′16″E
- Elevation: 89.7 m (294 ft)
- Owner: Sporveien
- Operator: Sporveien T-banen
- Line: Kolsås Line
- Distance: 15.5 km (9.6 mi) from Stortinget

Construction
- Structure type: At-grade
- Accessible: Yes

History
- Opened: 1 January 1930; 96 years ago

Services
Preceding station	Oslo Metro	Following station
Hauger towards Kolsås	Line 3	Avløs towards Mortensrud
Location

Gjettum is a station on the Kolsås Line of the Oslo Metro. It is located between Hauger and Avløs at the foot of Kolsås, 15.5 kilometers (9.6 mi) from Stortinget.

The station was opened 1 January 1930 as part of the tramway Lilleaker Line.

Along with most of the line, Gjettum was closed for upgrades between 1 July 2006 and 12 October 2014 with its service temporarily provided by bus route 42. Gjettum, among other things, received longer platforms which can accommodate trains with up to six cars like most of the subway system and was moved to compensate for the closure of Valler.
