= Engerjordet (station) =

Former tram stop in Oslo, Norway

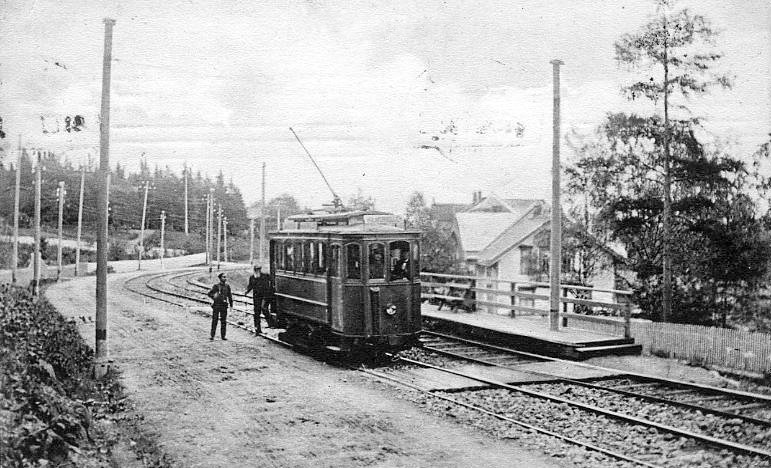
- Engerjordet Station ca. 1910-1915

General information
- Location: Oslo; Norway
- Coordinates: 59°56′57.10″N 10°41′57.15″E
- Owner: Holmenkolbanen
- Line: Holmenkollen Line
- Platforms: 1 side platform
- Tracks: 2

Construction
- Structure type: At-grade

History
- Opened: 1898
- Closed: 1935
Location

Engerjordet is a former light rail station on the Holmenkollen Line in Oslo, Norway. It opened in 1898, to serve the resident Holmenkolbanen's executives. The station had a simple wooden platform and saw limited patronage. It was closed in 1935.

== History ==
The station was established concurrently with the line, on 31 May 1898. The distance to the neighboring stations was negligible: only 250 meters to Slemdal However, two influential people in the operating company Holmenkolbanen lived in the vicinity. The one was engineer Halvor Emil Heyerdahl, who lived at Heyerdahls vei 1 (named for himself). Presumably the station was at first not official, but trams would stop there to let the executives on and off. During the 1900s it received a platform. By then Johannes Harbitz, who also lived adjacent to the station, had become the company's director. Owing to limited patronage the station was closed in 1935, despite protests from residents. It remains the only station to have been closed on the line.

== Facilities ==
The station was situated at the intersection of Slemsdalsveien and Heyerdals vei. It was equipped with a simple, wooden platform on the one side. The station was located between Slemdal and Ris. Due to the vicinity to these stations there were few passengers who used Engerjordet. The station was named for the farm Enger.
