= Valler station =

Former Oslo metro station

Valler
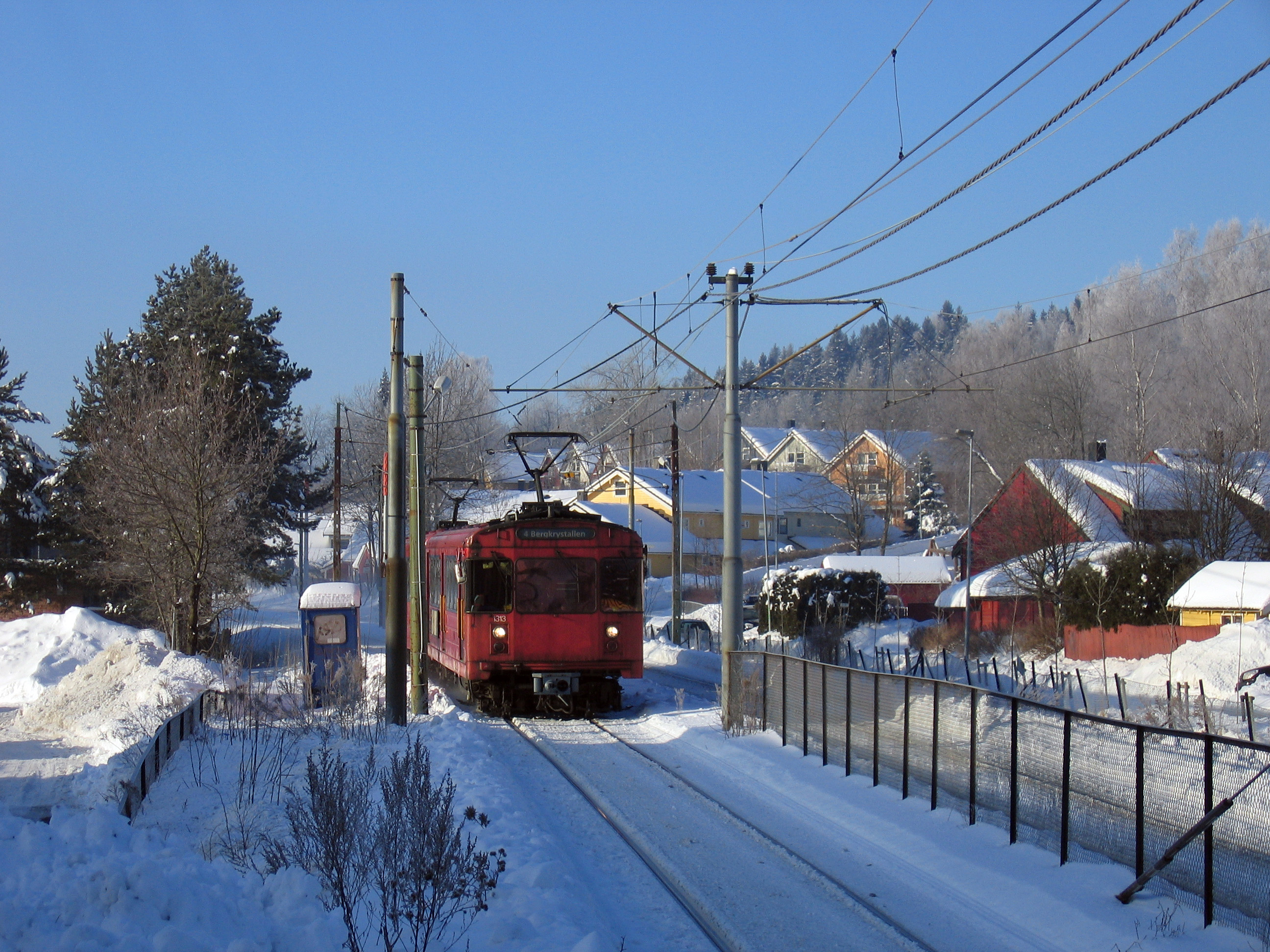

General information
- Location: Bærum; Norway
- Coordinates: 59°54′32.5″N 10°32′02″E
- Elevation: 68.5 m (225 ft)
- Owner: Sporveien
- Operator: Sporveien T-banen
- Line: Kolsås Line
- Distance: 14.8 km (9.2 mi) from Stortinget

Construction
- Structure type: At-grade
- Accessible: Yes

History
- Opened: 1 January 1930
- Closed: 1 July 2006
Location

Valler is a former station on the Kolsås Line of the Oslo Metro. It was located between Gjettum and Avløs, 14.8 kilometers (9.2 mi) from Stortinget.

The station opened on 1 January 1930 as part of the tramway Lilleaker Line.

Along with most of the line, Valler has been closed for upgrades since 1 July 2006 and its service is temporarily provided by bus. The line reopened on 12 October 2014, but it was decided that Valler would not reopen. Instead, Gjettum station was moved closer to Valler. Gjettum, among other things, received longer platforms which can accommodate trains with up to six cars like most of the subway system.
