= Jar, Norway =

- Village
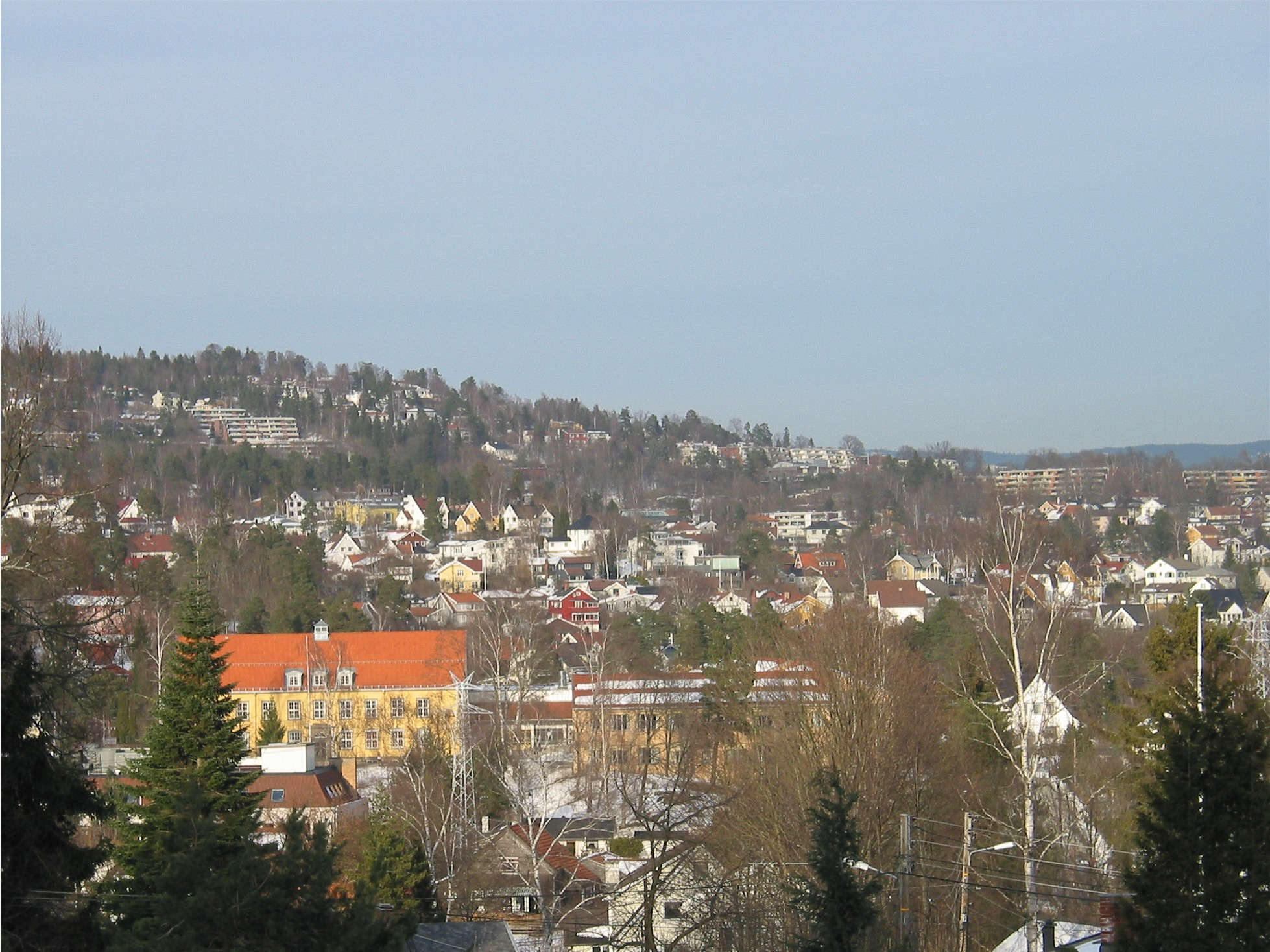
- A view Jar and Ullern

- Location in Akershus
- Coordinates: 59°55′N 10°36′E
- Country: Norway
- Region: Østlandet
- County: Akershus
- District: Asker og Bærum
- Municipality: Bærum
- Jar farm: 1413 (613 years ago)
- Residential areas: 1923 (103 years ago)
- Jar stasjon: 1 June 1924 (102 years ago)

Area
  - Total: 2.795 km^{2} (1.079 sq mi)
- Elevation: 84 m (276 ft)

Population (2025)
  - Total: 7,271
  - Density: 2,601/km^{2} (6,740/sq mi)
- Estimate
- Time zone: UTC+01:00 (CET)
  - Summer (DST): UTC+02:00 (CEST)
- Post Code: 1358, 1368

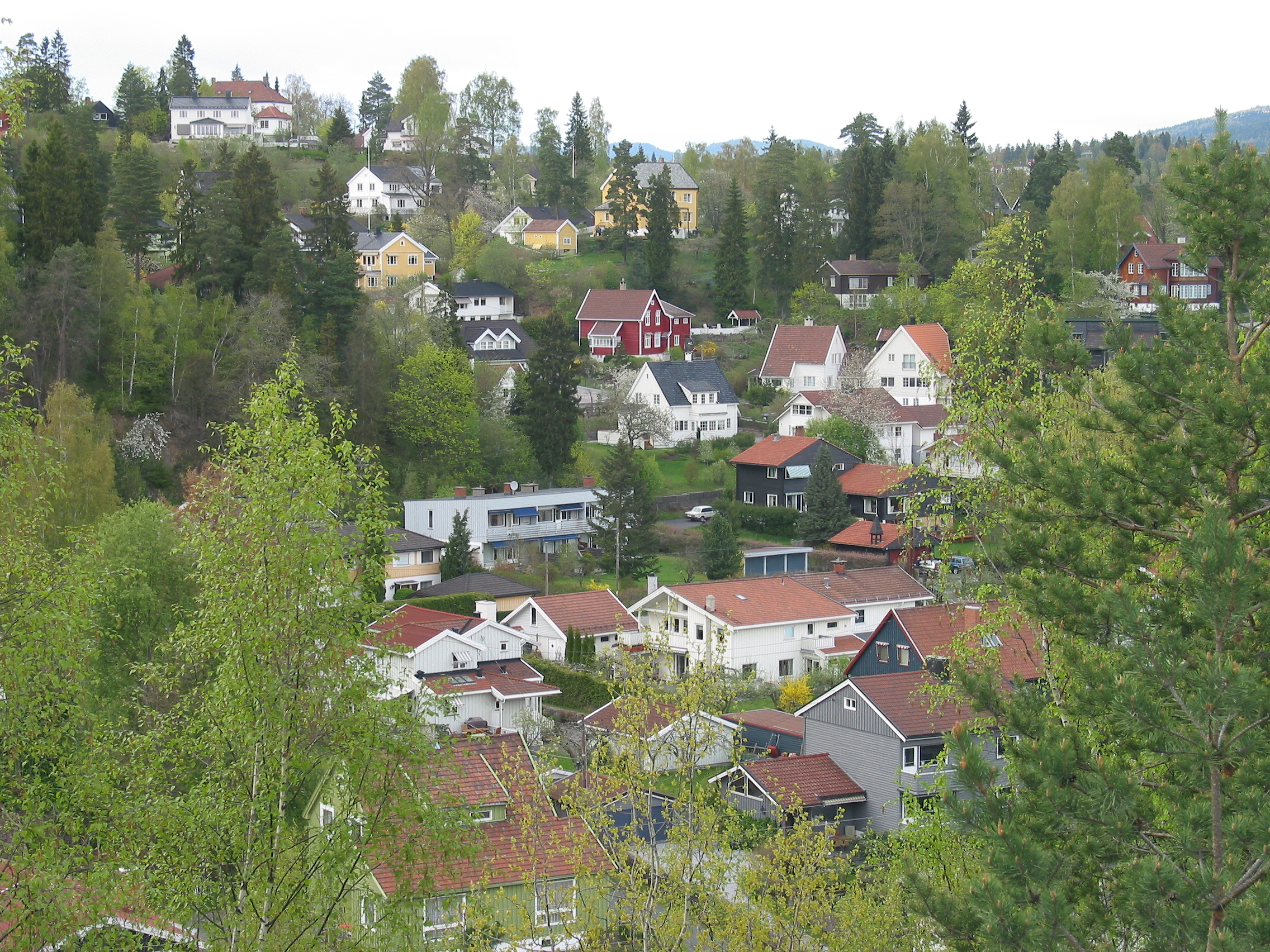
View of lower Jar

Jar is a district in the municipality of Bærum, Norway. Its annual population change (2020 - 2025), was 1.1%.

It is served by the Jar rail station on the Kolsås Line.

== Etymology ==
The name "Jar" comes, like Jæren, from old norse Jaðarr, meaning "edge". It's named this because it's at the edge of the deep valley of Lysakerelven.

== Famous people from Jar ==
- Andreas Prestmo - musician
- Jon Larsen - musician, composer, visual artist, researcher
- Per Frydenlund - musician
- Svein Aarbostad - musician
- Anders Beer Wilse - photographer
- Aleksander Hetland - swimmer
- Aleksander Aamodt Kilde - alpinist

== Education ==
The main school at Jar is Jar skole, opened in 1926. It had 590 students in 2018.
