= Sørbyhaugen station =

Former Oslo metro station

Coordinates: 59°56′22″N 10°40′39″E

Sørbyhaugen
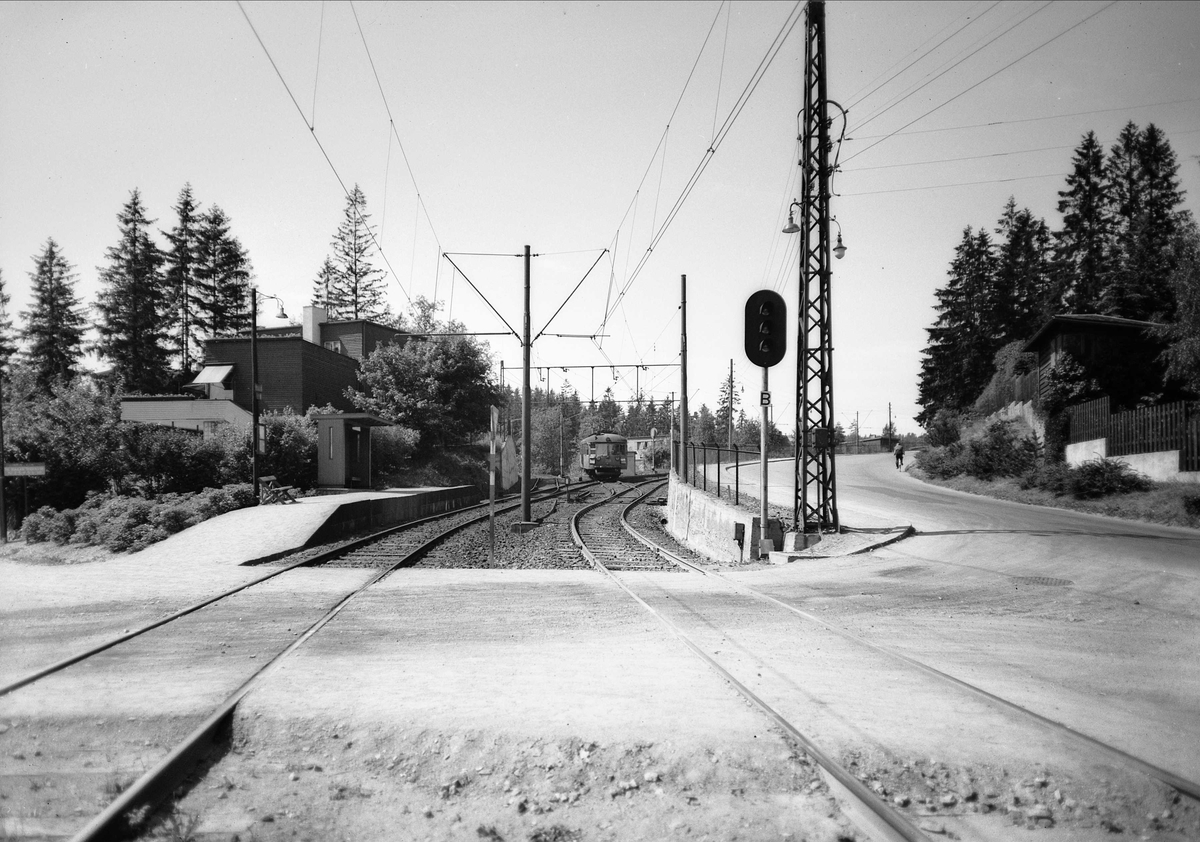
- Sørbyhaugen in the 1950s

General information
- Location: Vestre Aker, Aker (1935–1948); Oslo (1948–); Norway
- Elevation: 82.0 m (269.0 ft)
- Line: Røa Line
- Distance: 5.1 km (3.2 mi)

Construction
- Structure type: At-grade

History
- Opened: 1935
- Closed: 1995
Location

Sørbyhaugen is a former subway station on the Oslo Metro.

The station was located between Smestad and Makrellbekken, and was opened when the Røa Line was created, as an extension from Smestad to Røa on 24 January 1935. From 1942 it was the point from which the Kolsås Line branched off the Røa Line, offering a T-bane connection into the neighboring municipality Bærum. It was closed as a part of the Røa Line overhaul in 1995.
