= Bekkestua station =

Oslo metro station

Bekkestua
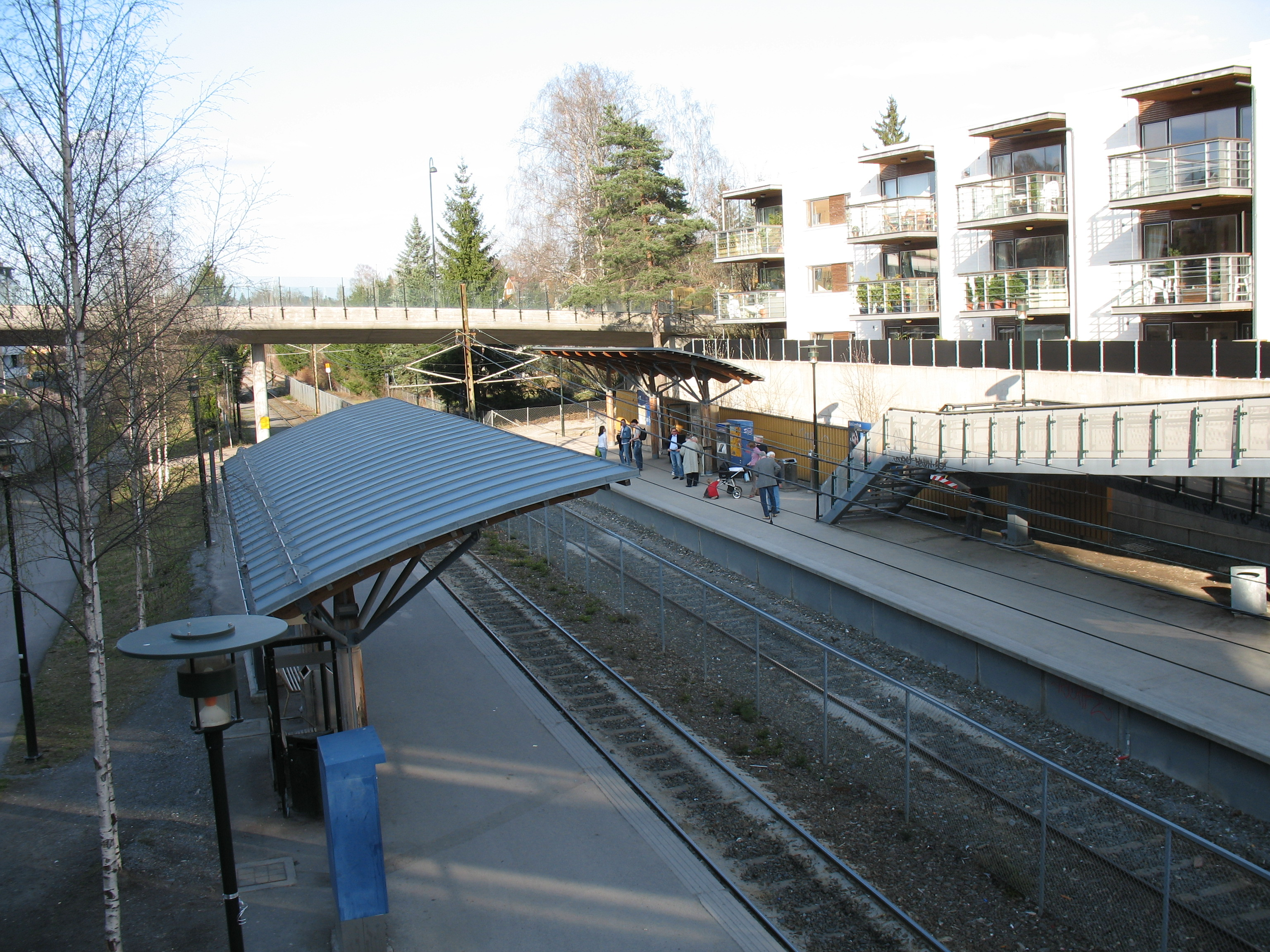
- Bekkestua Metro station before the reopening.

General information
- Location: Bekkestua, Bærum; Norway
- Coordinates: 59.91633°N 10.58756°E
- Elevation: 58.9 m (193 ft)
- Owner: Sporveien
- Operator: Sporveien T-banen; Sporveien Trikken
- Lines: Kolsås Line; Lilleaker Line
- Distance: 11.4 km from Stortinget
- Tracks: 3
- Connections: Bus: 140, 150, 145 (Rush Hour), 220, 230, 140N, 211, 212, 213, 214, 216 and FB3.

Construction
- Structure type: At-grade
- Parking: None
- Cycle facilities: Yes
- Accessible: Yes

Other information
- Fare zone: 1

History
- Opened: 1 May 1924; 102 years ago
- Rebuilt: 1 June 2006; 20 years ago to 15 August 2011; 15 years ago

Services
Preceding station	Oslo Metro	Following station
Gjønnes towards Kolsås	Line 3	Ringstabekk towards Mortensrud
Preceding station	Trams in Oslo	Following station
Terminus	Line 13	Jar towards Ljabru
Location

Bekkestua is a station and tram stop that is served both by Oslo Metro on Kolsås Line and Oslo Tramway on Lilleaker Line situated at Bekkestua in Bærum, Norway. It is the terminus of the Lilleaker Line for tramway.

Located between Ringstabekk and Gjønnes, it was reopened on 15 August 2011 after being closed on 1 July 2006. Between 1 July 2003 and November 2004, Bekkestua was the end station on the Kolsås Line. For a while the station was only being served by the Oslo Tramway line 13, while the station was closed for an upgrade.

Since 2 December 2007, tram operations (on line 13) have returned on this line from Lilleaker to Bekkestua. Operations beyond Lilleaker use SL95 trams as there is no turnback loop at Bekkestua. The tram operations were discontinued in 2009, but reopened in January 2014 after technical difficulties delayed the opening by one month. Bekkestua bus terminal is only a minute's walk from the metro and tram platforms (1, 2, 3).

== Bus transfers (bus terminal) ==
Bekkestua is a transportation hub with connections to bus lines:

140 (Skøyen via Østerås)
145 (Fornebu via Stabekk and Lysaker)
150 (Gullhaug - Oslo Bus Terminal)
220 (Sandvika via Haslum and Valler
230 (Sandvika - (Ila/Listuveien)
211 (Sandvika - via Haslum)
212 (Bekkestua Round Route) via Hosle
213 (Sandvika) via Høvik and Blommenholm
214 (Bekkestua Round Route) via Ekern and Jar
216 (Kleivveien) via Søråsen
N140 (Oslo Bus Terminal - via Hosle, Østerås and Lysaker)
FB3 (Oslo Airport via Røa and Økern)

Øygardveien, which is served by route 150E (Gullhaug-Nationaltheatret) is about a 10–15 minutes walk away.
