= Kolsås Line =

Rapid transit line in Norway

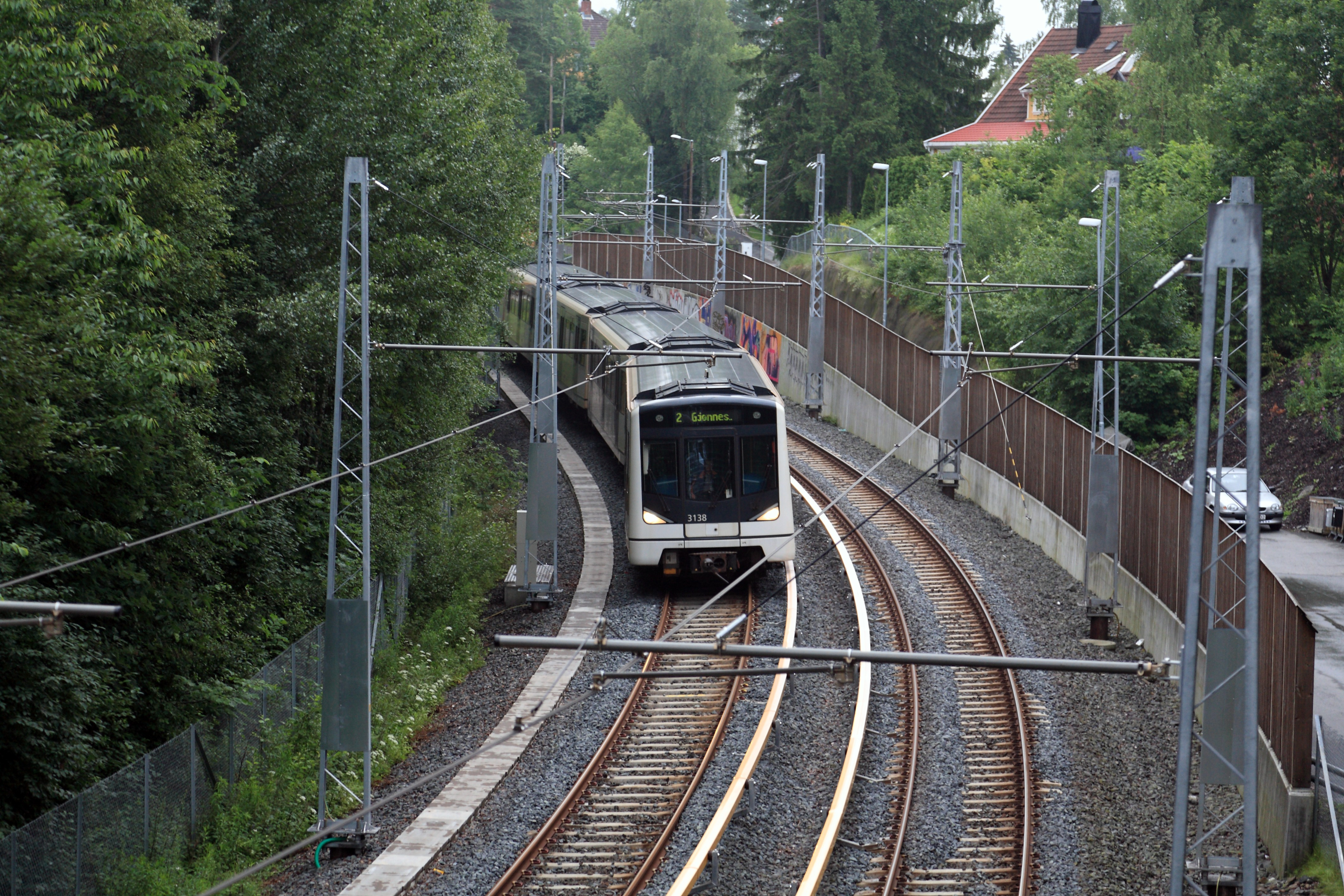
- MX3000 train near Ringstabekk

Overview
- Native name: Kolsåsbanen
- Status: Operational
- Owner: Sporveien
- Termini: Smestad; Kolsås
- Stations: 12

Service
- Type: Rapid transit/Tramway (shared)
- System: Oslo Metro; Oslo Tramway
- Operator(s): Sporveien T-banen (metro); Sporveien Trikken (trams)
- Depot(s): Avløs Metro Depot
- Rolling stock: MX3000 (metro); SL95 (trams)

History
- Opened: July 1, 1924
- Closed: Metro: July 1, 2006; Trams: 2009
- Reopened: October 12, 2014 (entire line)

Technical
- Line length: 12.2 km (7.6 mi)
- Number of tracks: Double
- Track gauge: 1,435 mm (4 ft 8 1/2 in) standard gauge
- Electrification: 750 V DC from third rail (metro) or overhead catenary (trams)
- Operating speed: 70 km/h (43 mph)
- Highest elevation: 94.6 m (310 ft)

The Kolsås Line (Norwegian: Kolsåsbanen) is a 12.1-kilometer (7.5 mi) line of the Oslo Metro. It branches off from the Røa Line at Smestad Station and runs through western Oslo and Bærum to Kolsås Station. It serves the neighborhoods of Ullernåsen, Øraker, Jar, Bekkestua, Haslum, Gjettum and Kolsås. It is served by Line 3 of the metro at a 15-minute headway. The section from Jar to Bekkestua is built as a dual system with overhead wires, allowing Line 13 of the Oslo Tramway to continue from the Lilleaker Line to Bekkestua every ten minutes.

The Kolsås Line was built as an extension of the Lilleaker Line. It had been built to Lilleaker in 1919. The line was extended to Avløs on 1 July 1924, and the line was extended to Kolsås on 1 January 1930. The line was initially owned by Bærumsbanen, which was bought by Oslo Sporveier in 1934. A connection to the Røa Line opened on 15 June 1942, allowing the line access to the Common Tunnel. At this point the section from Sørbyhaugen to Kolsås was designated the Kolsås Line, while the section from Jar to Skøyen was retained as the Lilleaker Line. T1300 trains of the metro were introduced in 1982 and from 1995 it was linked with the eastern metro lines. The line was closed for upgrades to metro standard in 2006. It reopened in eight stages from 2008 to 2014. There are plans to extend the line to Rykkinn, Bærums Verk and Sandvika, although none of these have political priority.

== Route ==
The 12.1-kilometer (7.5 mi) Kolsås Line branches off from the Røa Line after Smestad Station at a site previously occupied by the now closed Sørbyhaugen Station. Sørbyhaugen is situated 5.1 kilometers (3.2 mi) from Stortinget at an elevation of 63.7 meters (209 ft). Previously there was a station at Husebybakken. The line runs parallel to Ring 3, through four stations in Oslo: Montebello, Ullernåsen, Åsjordet and Bjørnsletta. Situated at 94.6 meters (310 ft) elevation, Ullernåsen is the highest elevated station on the line. The line largely runs along Bærumsveien from slightly before Bjørnsletta.

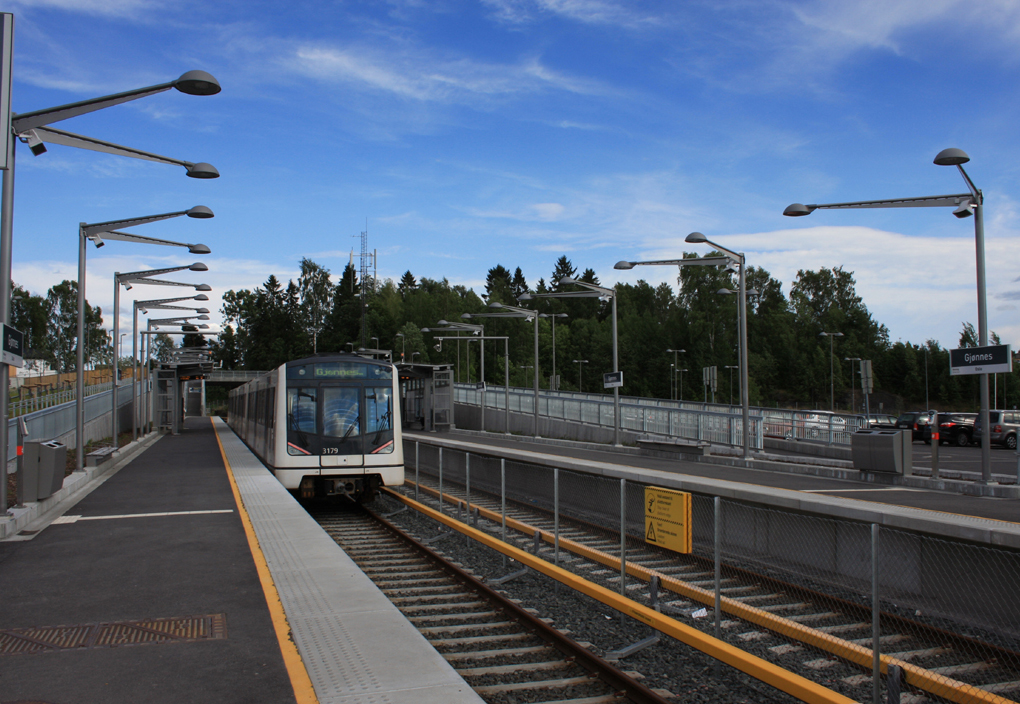
MX3000 train at Gjønnes after its 2013 upgrade

At Øraker the Lilleaker Line meets the Kolsås Line, after which point the lines share tracks. The line crosses the municipal border across the river Lysakerelven. The now closed station of Lysakerelven, 8.4 kilometers (5.2 mi) from Stortinget, was situated on the Bærum side of the municipal border between Oslo and Bærum. At Jar there are two sets of platforms, one for the metro and one for the trams. The continues past Ringstabekk, which is only served by the metro. It replaced three disused stations, Tjernsrud, Ringstabek and Egne hjem. Situated 11.4 kilometers (7.1 mi) from Stortinget, Bekkestua is the terminal station for the tramway, and a major transit hub for central Bærum. Like Jar, it features two sets of different platforms. The shared rail section features both third-rail power supply and overhead wires. The trams have a narrower loading gauge and shorter platforms, making it necessary to provide separate platforms for them.

The line continues past Gjønnes and Haslum to Avløs, which is one of the three Oslo Metro depots. After that point, it passes through the stations of Valler to Gjettum and Hauger before reaching the terminus, Kolsås Station, which, situated 17.3 kilometers (10.7 mi) from Stortinget, is the terminus of line 3 and the station furthest away from the centre of Oslo.

== Service ==
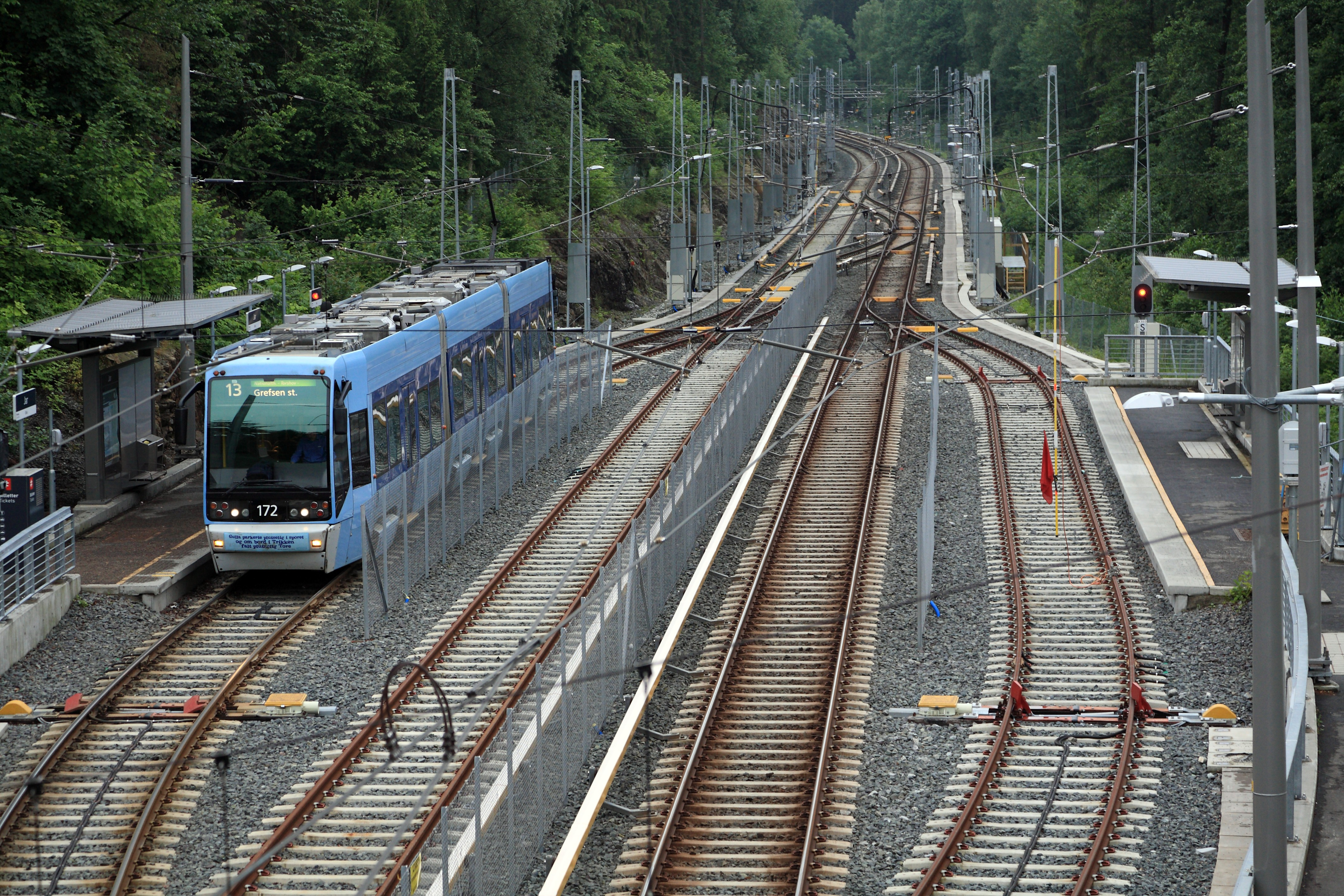
SL95 tram at Jar

The Kolsås Line is served by Line 3 of the metro. During regular hours, is operates at a 15-minute headway. It runs along the Røa Line from Smestad to Majorstuen and onwards in the Common Tunnel through the city center. East of the center the Line 3 continues along the Østensjø Line to Mortensrud. Travel time from Kolsås to Smestad is 22 minutes, and from Kolsås to Stortinget is 30 minutes. Operations are carried out by Sporveien T-banen on contract with Ruter, the public transport authority in Oslo and Akershus. The infrastructure itself is owned by Sporveien, a municipal company. Service is provided using MX3000 three- and six-car trains. In 2002 the stations along the line had an average weekday 8,568 boarding passengers. Bekkestua was the busiest with 1,126 daily boarding passengers, while Lysakerelven had the least with 235.

Jar is also served by Line 13 of the tramway. It branches off on the east side of Lysakerelven and follows the Lilleaker Line to Skøyen, where it continues as a street tram to the city center along the Skøyen Line. It operates at a ten-minute headway. Travel time to Jernbanetorget is 31 minutes from Bekkestua. In comparison, the metro uses 22 minutes from Bekkestua to Jernbanetorget. Tram operations are carried out by Sporveien Trikken using SL95 trams.

== History ==
=== Background ===
Bærum grew as a suburb of Oslo after the Drammen Line of the Norwegian State Railways opened through the southern part of the municipality in 1872. The areas around the railway stations became popular among the middle class, while the lower class started to settle further north. In particular the areas around Nadderud and Presterud received working-class populations. The construction of the settlements were often organized by trade unions. Local investors applied in 1897 to establish a tramway that would run parallel to the Drammen Line from Oslo to Sandvika—which at the time was steam-hauled, narrow gauge and single tracked and suffered from low regularity. The application was rejected by the Ministry of Labour in 1906 to avoid competition with the railway. Instead, the state started to modernize the Drammen Line by converting it to standard gauge, electrifying it and building double track.

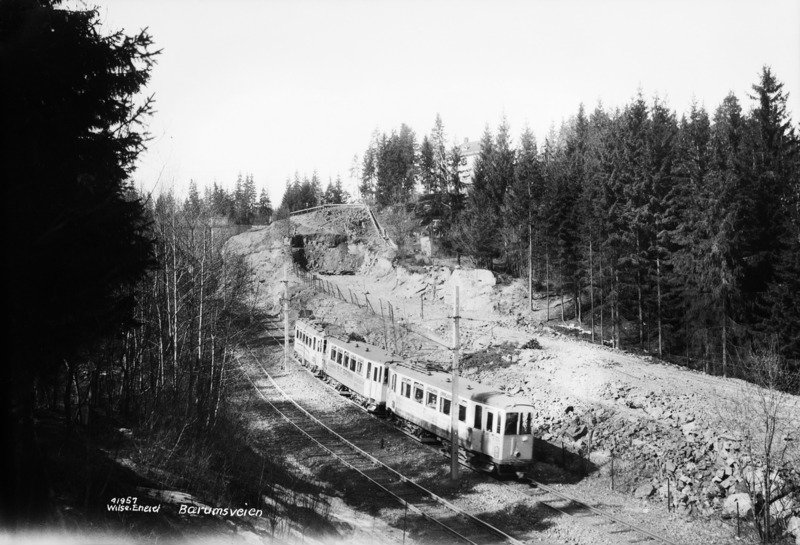
Class A tram near Jar in 1935

Two proposals were issued in 1917 for a suburban tram line further north. The southern proposal was to build the line as an extension of the Lilleaker Line, which would open in 1919. The line would go from the initial terminus at Lilleaker and extend towards Jar and Nadderud to Haslum. The northern proposal was for an extension of the Røa Line (at the time called the Smestad Line) via Røa to Hosle, Haslum and Fleskum to Kolsås. The latter was essentially a combination of the current Røa and Kolsås Lines. The two proposals caused local debate; generally people in western Bærum in general supported the northern line and people in eastern Bærum supported the southern line. An agreement was quickly reached with Kristiania Elektriske Sporvei (KES), the owner of the Lilleaker Line. The municipal council voted in favor of the southern line in 1921 after first rejecting a proposal to negotiate trackage rights with Holmenkolbanen. The main argument for the southern alternative was that the municipality would not have to pay any of the investment costs for the section of the line that would be localed within Aker.

KES' operations in Oslo were municipalized in 1924 and became Oslo Sporveier. However, the Lilleaker Line was kept outside the expropriation. The expansion to Bærum was financed in part by the cash from the sale of the rest of the company and in part from free land from the municipality. Concession from Lilleaker to Bekkestua was granted in 1922, and on 28 December Bærum Municipal Council approved to extend the line from Bekkestua to Haslum. The line to Bekkestua opened on 1 July 1924 and the extension to Hslum on 4 November. KES rebranded itself and became Bærumsbanen. The company bought twelve Class A trams and twelve trailers from Zypen & Charlier of Germany. After running along the Bærum Line to Skøyen, the trams continued along the Oslo Sporveier-owned Skøyen Line to Athenæum in the center of Oslo. Each station was equipped with a small building where there was a kiosk, telephone, ticket sale and freight handling.

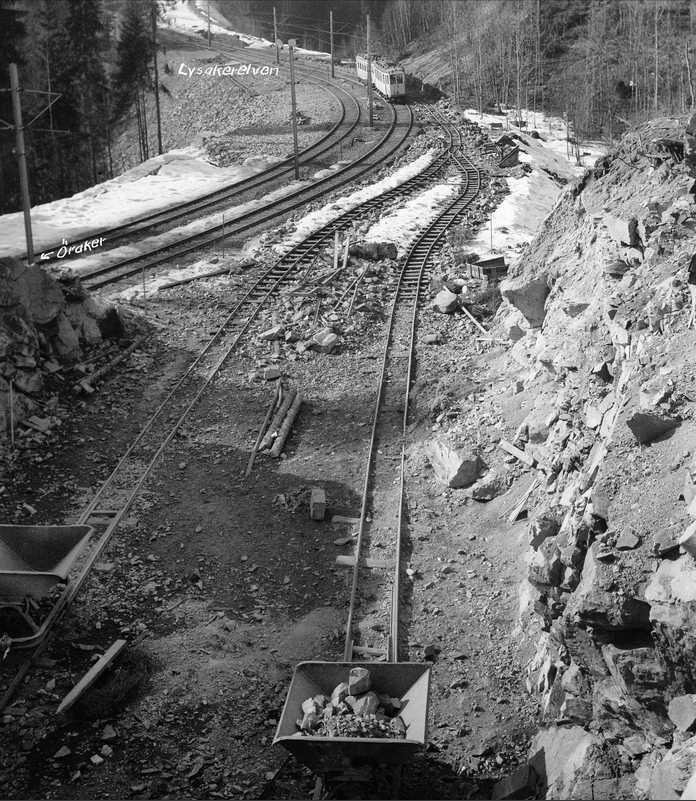
Extension of the line towards the underground in 1942

The depot was originally planned to be situated at Haslum, but a more suitable lot was found at Avløs. A subdivision with dwellings for 39 employee families was also built there. On 27 August, the ground around Bekkestua started to sink; the track was lifted and covered with stone. Two days later, the track had sunk into the ground and a small island was created in a nearby lake. It turned out that the area was resting on clay that had transformed to quick clay after a water pipe had broken. It took two weeks to repair the damage. It became clear in 1924 that Bærumsbanen would also have to operate city services along the Skøyen Line in Oslo. This caused the company to order three trams and trailers, this time from Skabo Jernbanevognfabrikk. At the time it cost NOK 0.15 to take the tram within the city limits of Oslo, and NOK 1 from the city to Bekkestua. Passengers carried out a strike in 1924; this resulted is slightly cheaper tickets, but at the same time the trams and stations were equipped with advertisements.

=== Kolsås extension ===
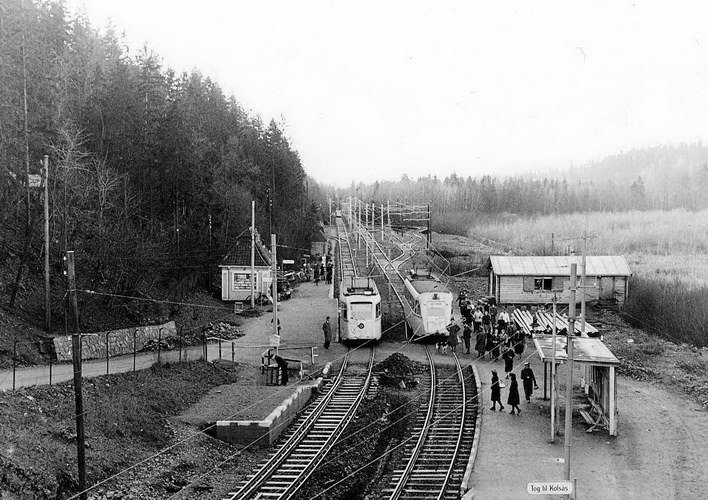
Two Gullfisk trams at Jar in 1942

The initial plans called for an expansion from Haslum to Kolsås. It was originally planned to run past Bærum Hospital to Løken Farm, but lack of funding instead forced the company to build the line along a cheaper section about one kilometer (half a mile) from the hospital. The free land for the extension was only valid for a limited time, and to be able to construct the line before the deadline, a single-track solution was chosen. The plans were passed by the municipal council in 1927 and concession granted on 10 February 1928. Construction started immediately, followed by track laying commencing in June 1929. The 4.3-kilometer (2.7 mi) extension opened on 1 January 1930. Valler Station had a passing loop and at Kolsås a balloon loop was built. The line caused the closing of the bus from Haslum to Bærum Hospital, and the bus from Lommedalen was rerouted to correspond with the tram at Kolsås.

A mixed route scheme was introduced, where full-service trams operated all stations from the city center to Jar, while express trams would only serve boarding passengers from Athenæum to Tjernsrud. The full-services ran every 12 minutes and the express services every 30 minutes. The full-service routes were reduced to a 15-minute headway in 1932, but a 15-minute headway was introduced to Bekkestua with the express service. During rush-hour, there was a 7-minute headway to Jar and additional services to Haslum.

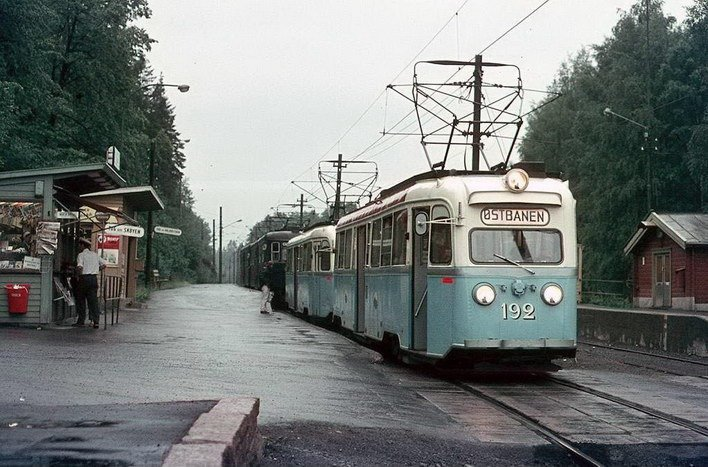
Gullfisk and a Class C tram at Jar in 1970

One of the conditions for the concession of 1924 was that the line was to be connected to the Common Tunnel of the Holmenkollen Line. Oslo Municipality demanded that the company either turn its trams at Skøyen or allow the municipality to purchase the company cheap. Bærumsbanen was bought by Oslo Sporveier on 1 October 1934 and turned into a subsidiary. The two companies had a common executive management, but retained separate operations. At the same time, Aker Municipality's tram company Akersbanerne was left operating a single line east of the city center, the Østensjø Line. In 1936, it was decided that Bærumsbanen would take over operation of this line, by operating the trams from the Kolsås Line through the city center to connect with the Østensjø Line. Operations started on 4 January 1937, and the 25-kilometer (16 mi) service was marketed as the Østensjø–Bærum Line. Although Bærumsbanen took over Akersbanerne's three Class A trams, up to three units from Ekebergbanen were also leased.

=== Underground connection ===
Since the birth of the line, plans had existed to connect to the Common Tunnel of the Holmenkollen Line. The tunnel would allow the trams to operate straight to the city center at Nationaltheatret, giving faster travel times and removing the heavy Class A trams from the city streets. A plan for the route from Jar to Sørbyhaugen on the Røa Line had been made in 1919, but by the 1930s, the Norwegian Radium Hospital and a tuberculosis hospital at Ullern had been built in the immediate vicinity of the line. Concession for this route was granted on 30 April 1937, but Aker Municipality protested, because they did not want noise pollution at the hospitals. Another concern was that the magnetic field from the overhead wires could affect the instruments at the hospitals. The route was therefore moved, but this made construction more difficult due to worse geological conditions.

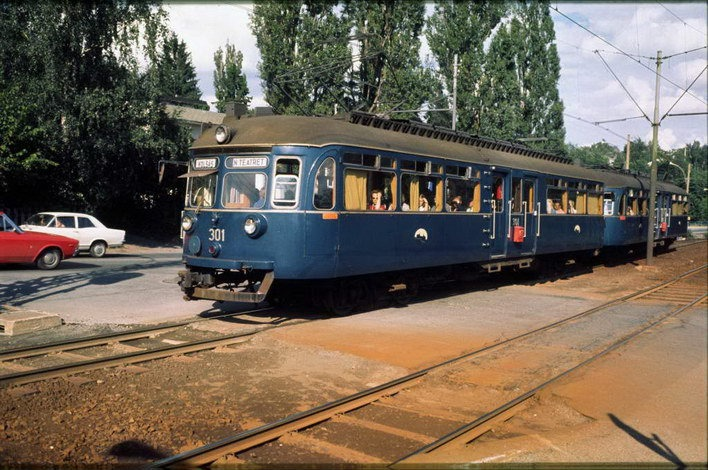
Class C1 tram at Sørbyhaugen in 1978, the station where the Kolsås Line branches off from the Røa Line

Construction started in 1939, but was put on hold in 1940 because of the break-out of the Second World War. Construction resumed in April 1941 and later the same year the first Class C trains were put into service. The work also involved widening the profile between Jar and Egne hjem so the Class C could operate on the whole length of the line. The connection from Jar to Sørbyhaugen opened on 15 June 1942. Double track was installed from Haslum to Kolsås; this opened on 23 December. A further six Class C were delivered, matching loading gauge of Holmenkolbanen's lines. In addition, two Class A trams were converted to the wider and longer Class D.

With the opening of the connection, the 16.4-kilometer (10.2 mi) section from Sørbyhaugen to Kolsås was designated the Kolsås Line, and the 3.8-kilometer (2.4 mi) section from Jar to Skøyen was designated as the Lilleaker Line. A balloon loop was built at Jar, allowing the new Class B trams that served the Lilleaker Line to turn there. This allowed for transfer between the two lines. The distance from Kolsås to Nationaltheatret was 16.4 kilometers (10.2 mi). During World War II, ridership on the whole tramway, including the Kolsås Line, skyrocketed. The line transported 5.7 million passengers in 1938, while in 1944 it transported 19 million. Ownership of rolling stock and all but two employees in Bærumsbanen were transferred to Oslo Sporveier in 1944. However, the ownership of the tracks and the formal operation rights remained with Bærumsbanen.

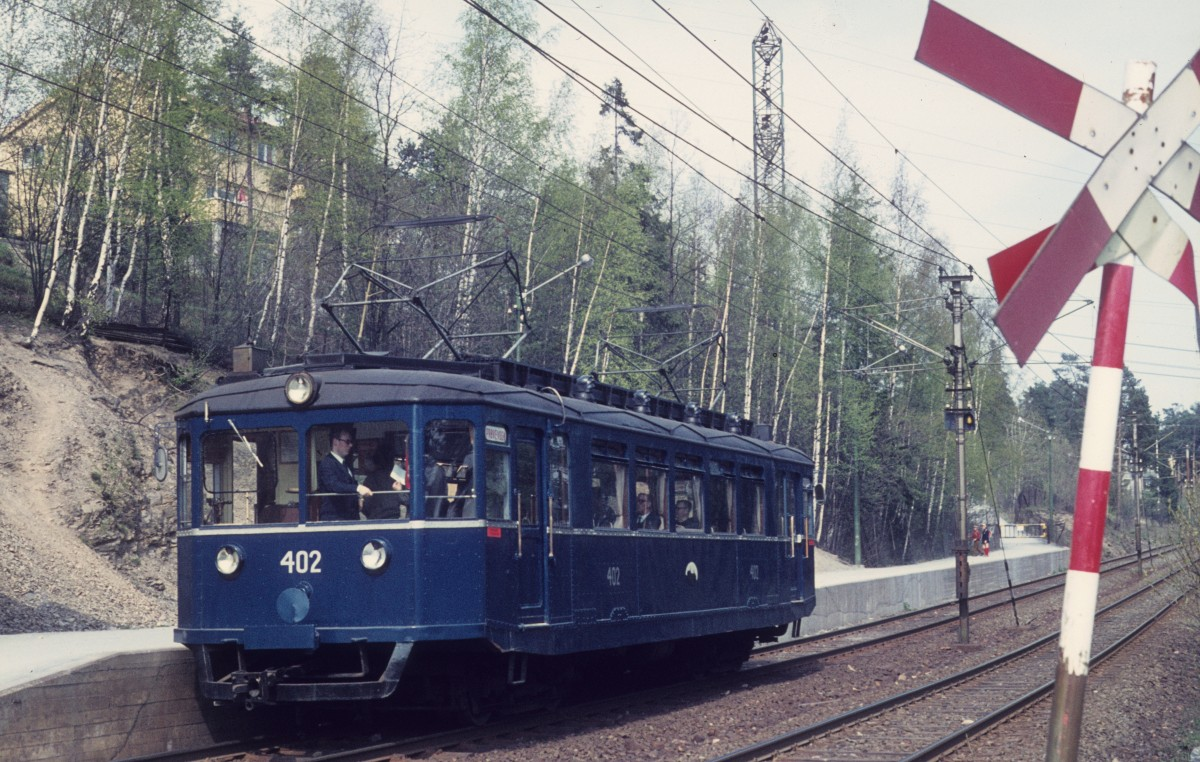
Class D train at Montebello in 1971

=== Post-war operations ===
By the end of the war in 1945 the line was in need of a major overhaul, in particular the overhead wires. Lack of materials and money caused the extraordinary maintenance to take four years. Limitations of freight were imposed in 1946, and were terminated the following year. At the same time, the Kolsås Line services were internally numbered 14, but it was first many years later that the number appeared on the destination signs and schedules. A former barracks was moved to Avløs in 1948, where it was used as office space. The line had unchanged fares from 1939 to 1951, when the prices hiked 27 percent. However, this was not sufficient to cover the 170 percent cost increase in the same period.

From 1949 to 1966, Avløs Depot built nine new Class C trams. The line also received two Class T trams in 1963, which were prototypes for the first Oslo Metro rolling stock. Mærradalen was closed on 5 July 1957 and the same day Ullernåsen was moved midway between its old location and that of Mærradalen. Husebybakken was closed for traffic on 19 June 1961, due to low ridership and close proximity to nearby stations. During the 1960s, the rectifier at Jar was replaced with a more modern one at Øraker and a new garage built at Avløs Depot. Since the 1960s, ridership remained stable at about four million passengers per year. From 1971, Bærumsbanen was liquidated and ownership and all aspects of operation of the line was transferred to Oslo Sporveier.

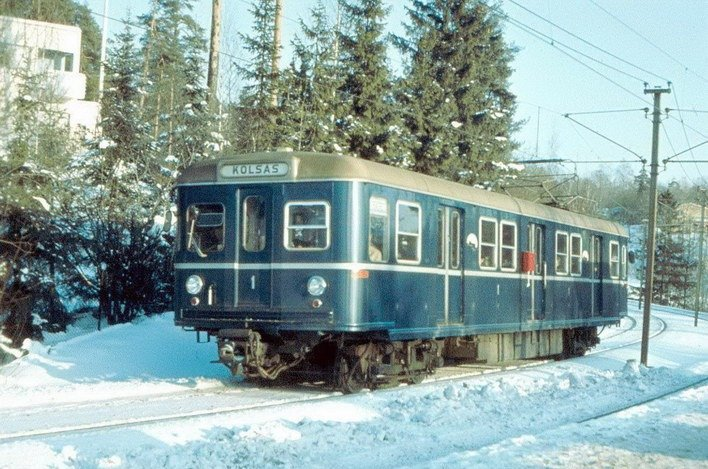
Class T tram at Bjørnsletta in 1970

Holmenkolbanen started taking delivery of the T1300 series of combined metro and tram multiple units in 1978. This caused Oslo Sporveier to put HKB 500 units into service on the Kolsås Line. The use of T1300 stock on the Kolsås Line required several upgrades: the platforms height was raised and the power supply was improved with new rectifiers at Ringstabekk and Kolsås. With the second delivery of T1300 stock in 1980 and 1981, the new units were put into service on the Kolsås Line. The T6 series of fifteen units were built with a driver's cab at both ends, so single-car trains could be operated in the evenings. This resulted in Class D being taken out of use in 1982. The conductor was removed from the service from 21 June 1982, when the T1300 entered service. During rush hour, Class C units were still in use and these retained their conductors.

Stortinget Station opened on 7 March 1987, allowing Line 14 was extended further into the city center. This section was incompatible with Class C units and these were therefore retired. To meet the required number of trains, six T1000 units were converted to T1300. The Røa Line from Sørbyhaugen to Volvat closed on 18 May 1995, allowing the Røa Line upgraded to metro standard. At the same time, the Lillaker Line tram was extended from Jar to Kolsås. The upgrade involved the line receiving automatic train control with cab signaling, third-rail power supply and longer platforms. Until 20 August, Line 14 only operated between Kolsås and Montebello. After the Røa Line reopened, the third rail had been laid to Montebello, and the trains had to switch power supply and signaling system there.

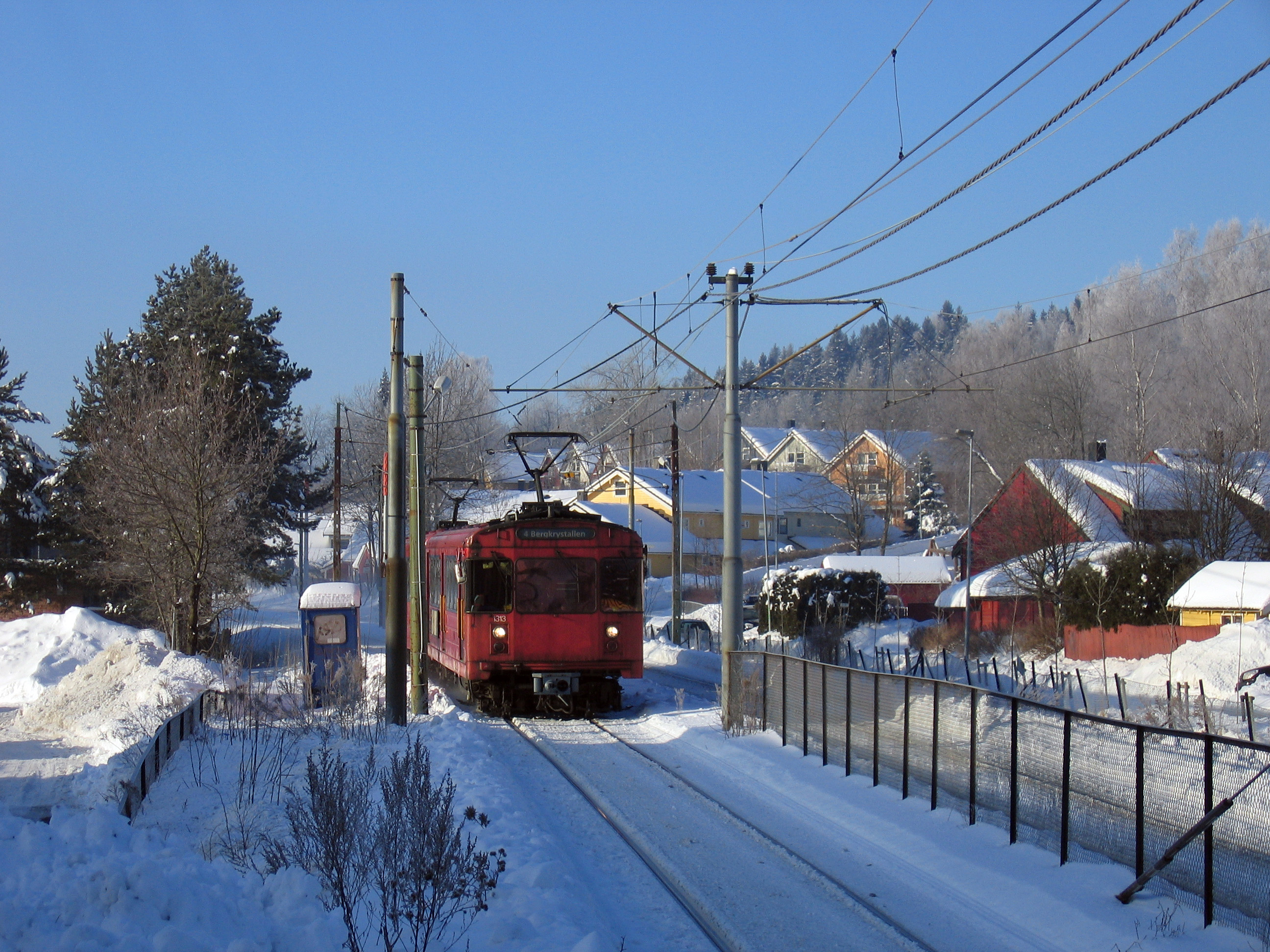
T1300 stock at Valler. When the line reopened, the overhead wire was gone.

The Kolsås Line was connected with the Lambertseter Line east of the city center from 19 November 1995, taking line number 4 and with operations running through the city center. Operations from Kolsås to Bergkrystallen required ten T1300 trains. Oslo Sporveier decided that it wanted to remove the rush-hour services and instead introduced three-car trains. Because of this, all station platforms were extended in 1997, with the schedule changes taking effect from 7 April. The Kolsås Line was connected to the Østensjø Line and given number 3 from 5 April 1998. All T1300 stock were overnighted at Majorstuen Depot from 21 March 1999 and Avløs was reduced to a maintenance center. From 12 April 2003 the Kolsås Line was again served by Line 4 and linked with the Lambertseter Line.

The new T2000 stock that was bought for the Holmenkollen Line was tested on the Kolsås Line in 1995, but the lower voltage made operations impossible. At Gjønnesjordet the current was measured at 311 volt. The current on the line was increased to 680 volt from 4 August 1995 and to 750 volt from 3 March 1999. The latter was done after the trams had been rebuilt to handle the increased voltage and the change took effect on the entire tramway.

=== Metro standard ===
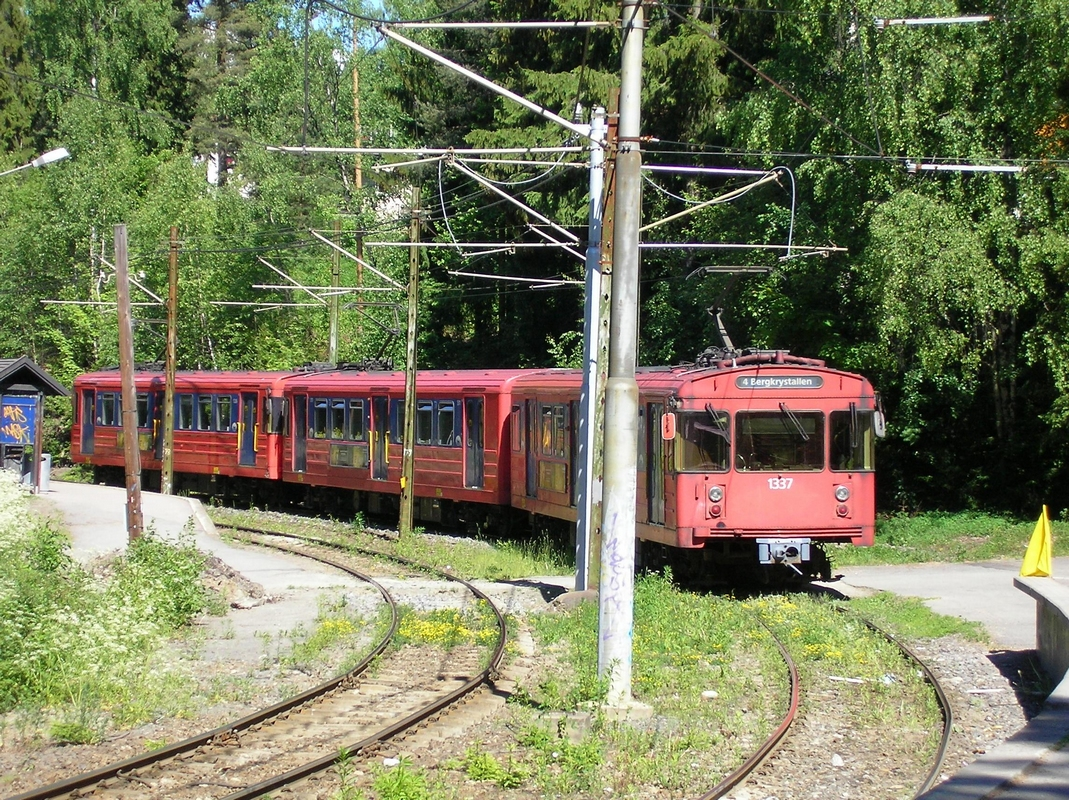
T1300 train at Tjernsrud on 14 June 2006

Budgetary disagreements between local politicians in Oslo, Bærum and Akershus led to the closure of the Bekkestua to Kolsås leg on 1 July 2003. This allowed Oslo Sporveier to reduce the number of trains to eight, using three-car trains during rush-hour and twin units in off-peak hours. The move was little popular with the patrons and followed by protests. A political agreement was thereby struck, allowing services to Kolsås to resume from 20 November 2004. However, the line was in such poor shape that the speed was reduced several places. Only one extra train was added to the line, giving poorer regularity.

Meanwhile, Akershus County Municipality was regarding what to do with the line. The first proposal came in 2002, when it was stated that the metro should terminate at Lysakerelven and that the rest of the line be operated as part of the tramway. Civitas published a report for the county in 2006. Critical remarks regarding costs and patronage issued by Oslo Sporveier were ignored. Based on the report, Akershus County Council passed a metro upgrade of the line. The cost from the municipal border to Kolsås was estimated at 677 million Norwegian krone. Both a metro and a tramway alternative were estimated to give the same traffic. The metro alternative would use four to eight minutes less to the city center, while the tramway would have six to eight departures per hour.

The second and final stage of the Ring Line opened on 20 August 2006. Oslo Sporveier was in dire need for more rolling stock and had insufficient to operate along the new line. Because the Ring required that the destination sign be changed mid-way, and this feature was only possible on the T1300 units and were therefore attractive. Oslo Sporveier officially announced the move through deeming the Kolsås Line unsafe for use. A new, temporary station was built at Husebybakken, which became the terminus and opened the same day as the Ring. Services ran a loop around the Ring Line as Line 6 and 4 and continued to Bergkrystallen, using nine T1300 trains. Within a year a few of the departures were being carried out using the new MX3000 trains.

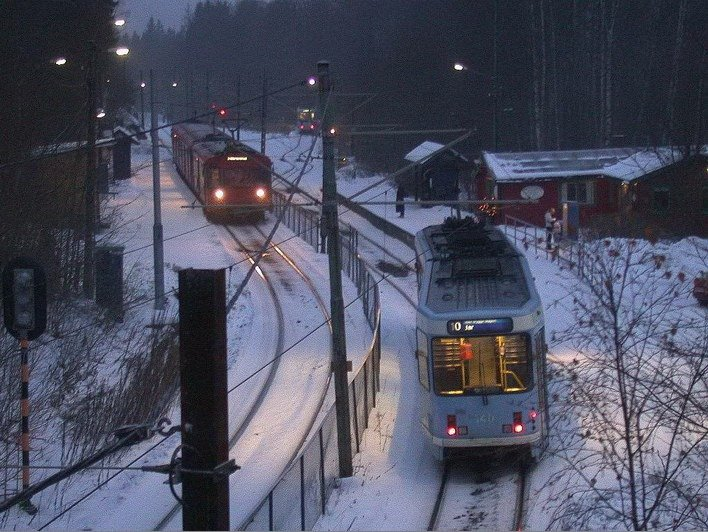
T1300 train (left) and SL79 tram at Jar in 2000

With the line closing in Bærum there came a series of protests. A main political concern was the increased traffic and congestion on the highways. The tramway continued to run to Jar, and therefore an extension of this service along the Kolsås Line was called for. After small investments were made the tram to Jar was extended to Bekkestua on 20 August 2007. The unidirectional SL79 trams had to run to Avløs to turn around, although they did not operate revenue services on the last leg, while SL95 trams turned at Bekkestua. The last day with a tram service was 15 February, after which the tram service was cut at Lilleaker.

The first upgrades were performed between Åsjordet and Montebello, including the last part of the line from Montebello to Sørbyhaugen. Husebybakken continued as Line 6's terminus until 31 May 2008, after which it was demolished. The first three upgraded stations, Montebello, Ullernåsen and Åsjordet, were put back into the service of Line 6 from 18 August. The upgrades were similar to those to the Røa Line in 1995, including installation of third rail, straight platforms long enough for six-car trains, a new signaling system as well as all-new permanent way and stations. From 22 June 2009 only MX3000 trains were used on the line, and from 11 April 2010 some of the departures started running with six-car trains.

Meanwhile, it became evident for the county that they had severely underestimated the conversion costs, which by 2009 were estimated at 2.5 billion krone. In addition to a general increase in construction costs, a major calculation error had been carried out based on estimates for a light rail, rather than a rapid transit. At the time of closing the estimates called for completion in 2011. An audit in 2010 concluded that the planning had been based on lack of reviews and risk management, with best-case estimates being used instead of properly risk-adjusted ones. Bærum Municipal Council rejected a proposition in 2010 to build additional housing in the vicinity of the metro stations.

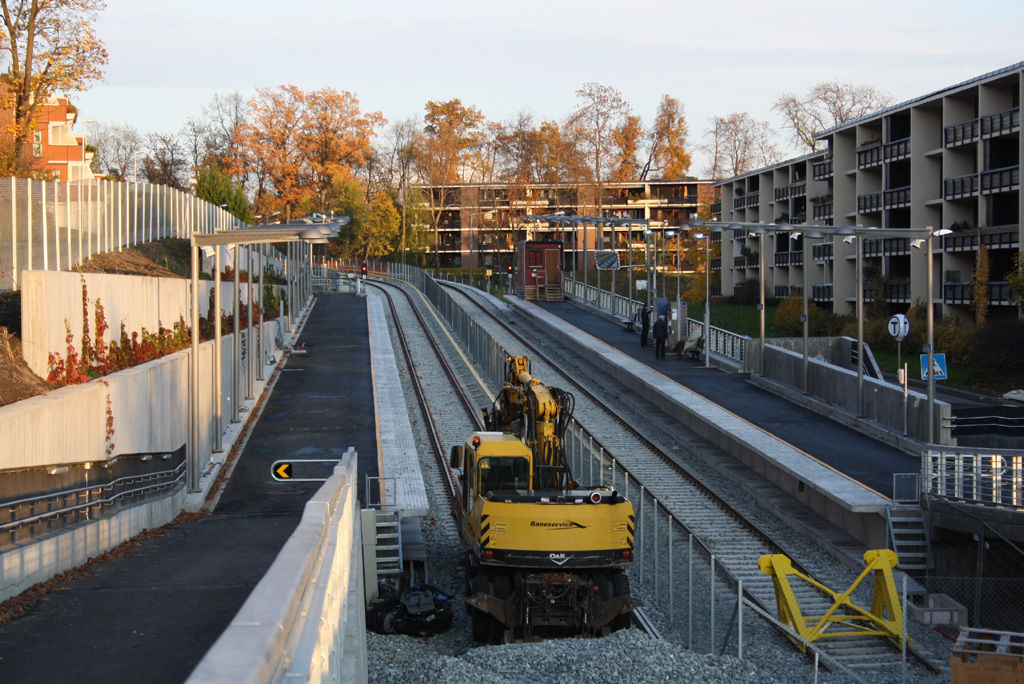
Upgrade of Åsjordet in 2008

The next section to open was to Bjørnsletta, on 18 August 2010. It was built in a new location, replacing the old station with the same name and Lysakerelven. This was followed by an extension of Jar 1 December. At the same time the tramway services were extended from Lilleaker to Jar. Another extension took place on 15 August 2011, to Bekkestua. Tjernsrud, the old Ringstabekk and Egne hjem were all closed and replaced with a new Ringstabekk Station. The route had been proposed slightly changed across Jarmyren, but lack of funding resulted in the old route being used, limiting speed to 50 kilometers per hour (31 mph). The extra cost of allowing trams to run to Bekkestua was 500 million kroner. On 8 October 2012 the line was extended 800 meters (2,600 ft) to Gjønnes, the shortest of the sections to open.

From 9 December 2012 the Kolsås Line was renumbered Line 2 and instead linked to the Furuset Line. Services were extended to Avløs on 15 December 2013. The rebuilding of Haslum resulted in the demolishment of several houses, while Avløs Station was moved somewhat westwards. The final stage was officially reopened on 12 October 2014. Valler and Gjettum was merged and the new Gjettum Station replaced them. The project also included a full upgrade of Avløs Depot, completed in August 2015. As of 2012 the costs for the metro upgrades is estimated at 2.9 billion kroner. The line was again renumbered to Line 3 and linked with the Østensjø line on 3 April 2016.

== Future ==
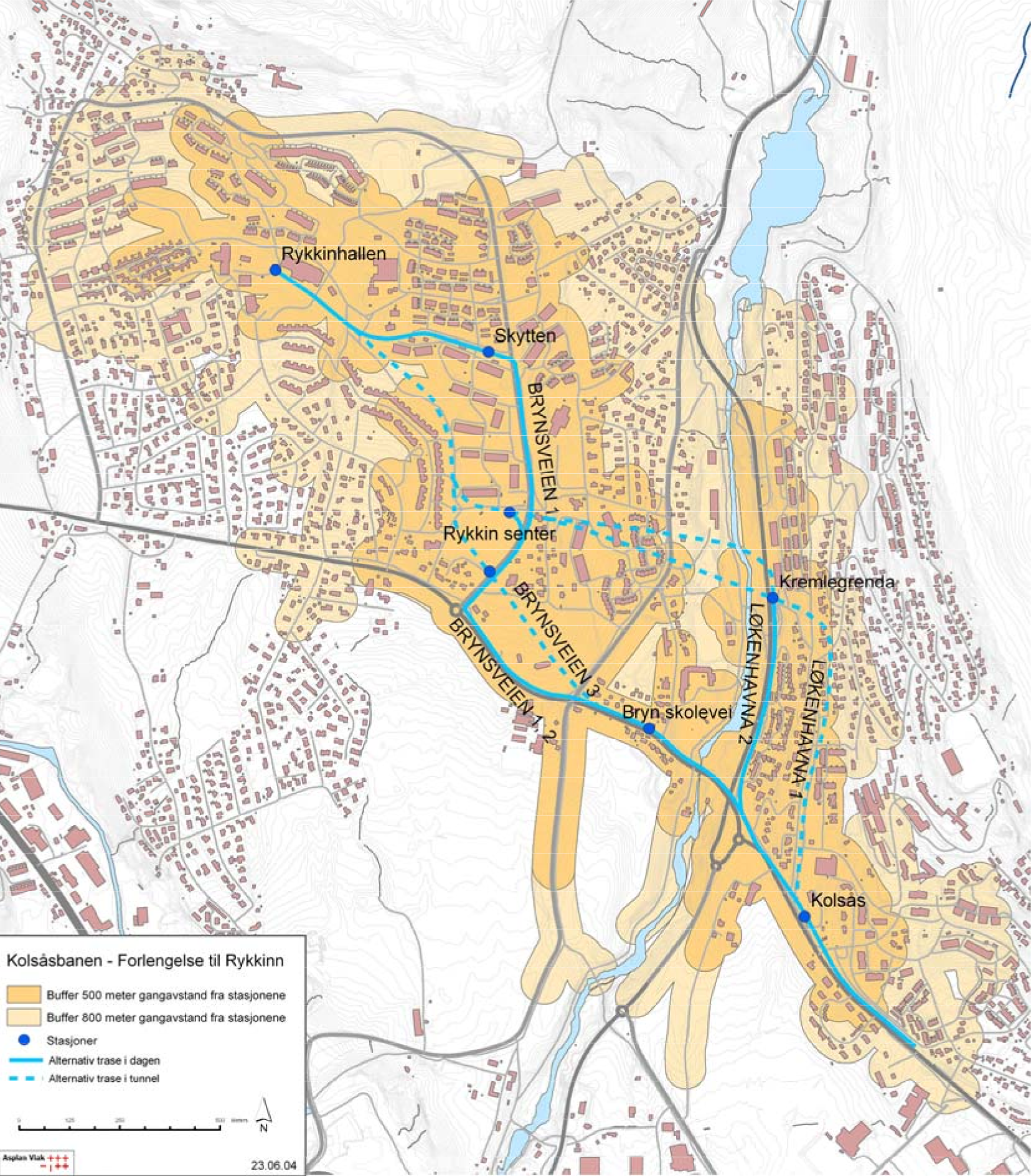
Map detailing possible light-rail routes from Kolsås to Rykkinn

Rykkinn is a neighborhood in the vicinity of Kolsås, an area with about 7,500 residents. Extension of the Kolsås Line to Rykkinn, possibly with a further extension to Bærums Verk, has been proposed. Several routes to Rykkinn have been proposed along various trajectories, normally with three stations. Some of these include routes in a tunnel. A light rail report was issued in 2004. Political indications state that the line will be prioritized after the Fornebu Line and the extension of the Furuset Line to Akershus University Hospital and that the extension would probably not be carried out until after 2025. Ruter stated the extensions, estimated to cost about 1 billion kroner, in its 2010 long-term statement.

A more extensive proposal is to not only extend the Kolsås Line to Rykkinn, but also to build a line from Sandvika to Kolsås and onwards to Rykkinn and possibly Bærums Verk. This could possibly also be combined with a line to Avtjerna, where Bærum Municipality is planning 5,000 single dwellings. Detailed in a 2008 report, both extensions of the metro and construction on an independent people mover system have been put forth. Travel time from Kolsås to Rykkinn is estimated at 4 minutes along a 2.6-kilometer (1.6 mi) line, largely in tunnel. An additional two additional minutes would be needed to Bærums Verk. Total travel time from Sandvika to Bærums Verk was estimated at 12 minutes. Costs were in 2008 estimated at 2.1 billion kroner from Kolsås to Bærums Verk, alternatively 3.5 billion for the whole route from Sandvika to Bærums Verk.

Sporveien Trikken is in the process of buying new trams. Because of their poor technical state and high maintenance costs, the company may choose to replace all its SL95s, despite their age. The tramway is pursuing a shelfware tram mode which has low investment costs and optimized for street running. If the trams are to be used concurrently with the metro, they need to have a reinforced cab to better withstand a head-on collision and automatic train protection. This will make procuring shelfware impossible, while providing worse sight-lines for the motorman and increased damage in case of collisions elsewhere. The increased unit cost per tram would be about 2 to 3.5 million kroner. In addition, the infrastructure at Bekkestua does not allow for trams with the international standard of 2.65-meter (8 ft 8 in) loading gauge. A 2013 report by Ruter therefore recommended that the tram services from Jar to Bekkestua only run until the SL95 trams are retired.
