= Jar station =

Oslo metro station

Jar
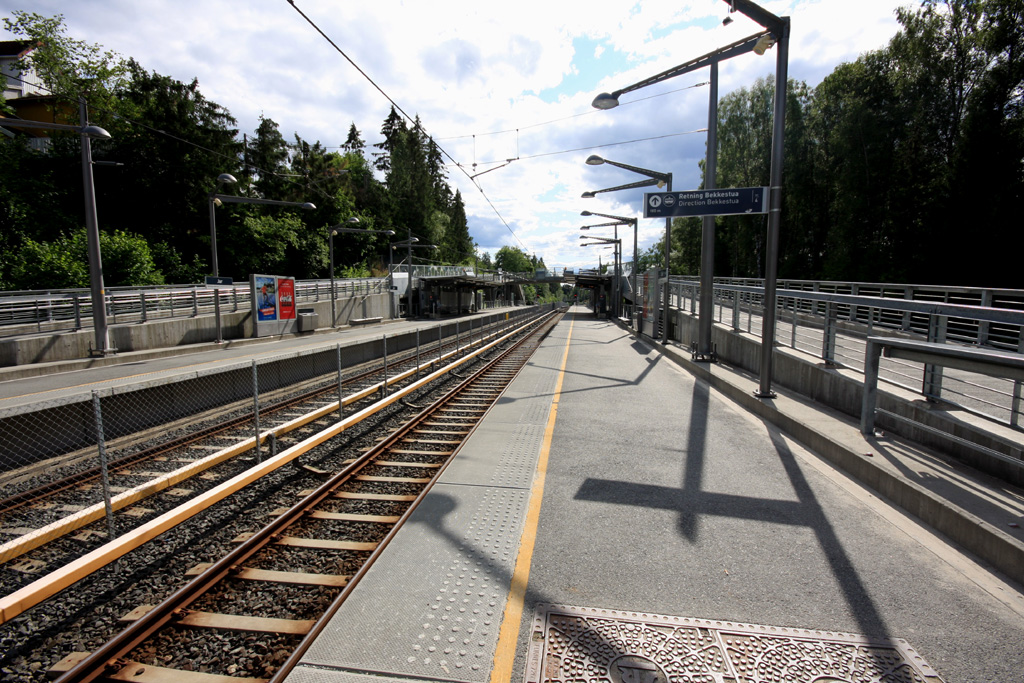

General information
- Location: Jar, Bærum; Norway
- Coordinates: 59°55′36″N 10°37′13″E
- Elevation: 68.2 m (224 ft)
- Owner: Sporveien
- Operator: Sporveien T-banen
- Lines: Kolsås Line (metro); Lilleaker Line (tramway)
- Distance: 9.1 km (5.7 mi) from Stortinget

Construction
- Structure type: At-grade
- Parking: Yes
- Cycle facilities: Yes
- Accessible: Yes

Other information
- Fare zone: 1

History
- Opened: 1 June 1924; 102 years ago
- Rebuilt: 1 July 2006; 20 years ago to December 1, 2010; 15 years ago

Services
Preceding station	Oslo Metro	Following station
Ringstabekk towards Kolsås	Line 3 Kolsås Line	Bjørnsletta towards Mortensrud
Preceding station	Trams in Oslo	Following station
Bekkestua Terminus	Line 13 Lilleaker Line	Øraker towards Ljabru
Location

Jar is a station served both by the Oslo Metro and the Oslo Tramway located in Bærum, just west of Lysakerelva which divides Oslo and Bærum. The track is shared, the tram line (Lilleaker Line) joins with the rapid transit line (Kolsås Line) on the Oslo side of the river. The station had a yellow penthouse and contained a newspaper outlet. However, after the reconstruction, the penthouse was reinstated but has a different colour.

Formerly, the entire line to Kolsås was part of the tram network. Jar was originally a terminus for the defunct line 10, and had a balloon loop. However, this has been removed and since the 2nd of December 2007, tram operations (line 13) have returned on this line from Jar to Bekkestua.

As of December 2016, the Tram line 13 is running trams (every 20 minutes, 15 at weekends.) to Bekkestua. The Oslo Metro line 3 also runs with an interval of every 15 minutes.

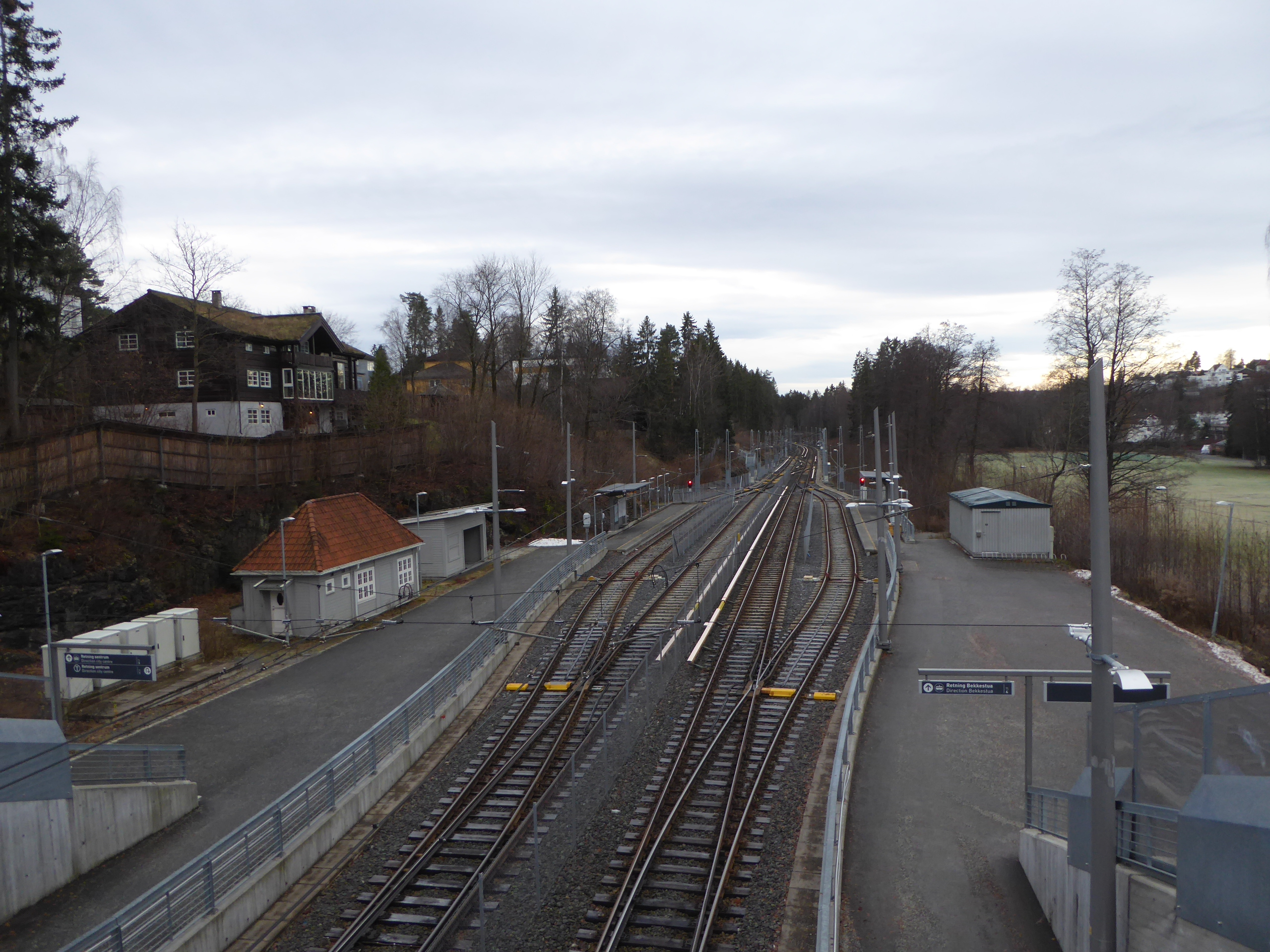
A view of the platforms at Jar; the station penthouse is visible and is on the left (westbound platform).
