= Kolsås station =

Oslo metro station

Kolsås
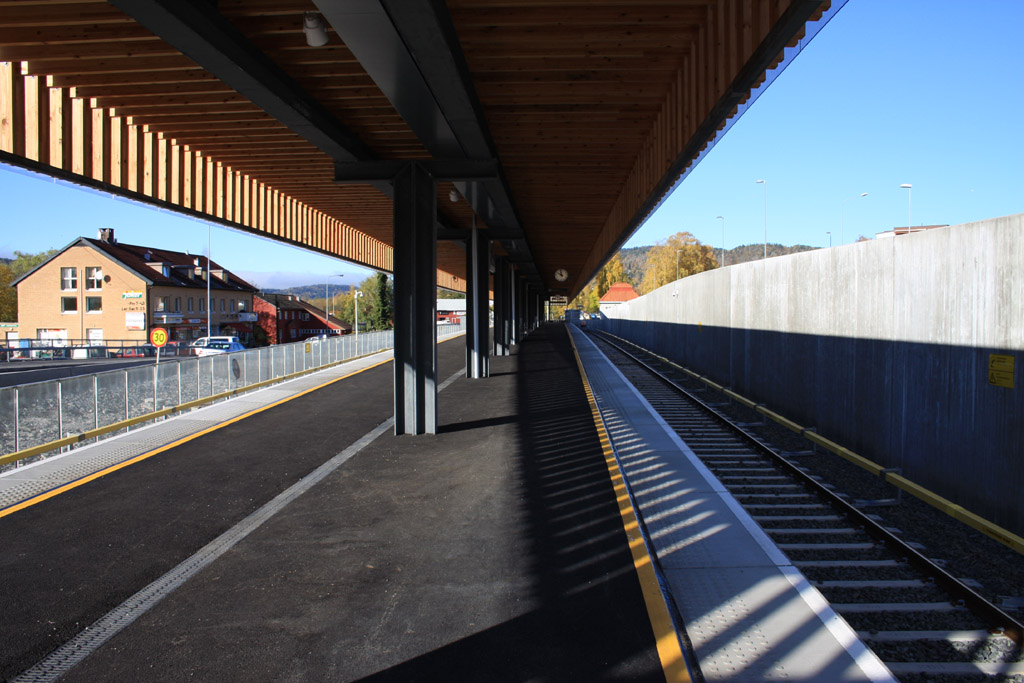
- Kolsås station platform after re-opening in October 2014

General information
- Location: Kolsås, Bærum; Norway
- Coordinates: 59°54′55″N 10°30′03″E
- Elevation: 65 m (213 ft)
- Owner: Sporveien
- Operator: Sporveien T-banen
- Line: Kolsås Line
- Distance: 17.3 km (10.7 mi) from Stortinget
- Platforms: 2 (1 island platform)
- Tracks: 2
- Connections: Bus: 160 Rykkinn - Oslo Bussterminal; 160E Rykkinn - Nationaltheatret; 210A Bykrsset - Sandvika; 210B Slalåmveien - Sandvika; 215A Sandvika via Vøyenenga; 215B Sandvika

Construction
- Structure type: At-grade
- Parking: No
- Accessible: Yes

Other information
- Fare zone: Metro: 1 Bus: 2V

History
- Opened: 1 January 1930; 96 years ago
- Rebuilt: 12 October 2014; 11 years ago

Services
Preceding station	Oslo Metro	Following station
Terminus	Line 3	Hauger towards Mortensrud
Location

Kolsås is the end station of the Kolsås Line on the Oslo Metro. The station, located in Bærum municipality, comes after Hauger, and is located 17.3 kilometers (10.7 mi) from Stortinget.

The station and line into Bærum was originally not built as a metro line but as the Lilleaker Line, built by Bærumsbanen. The station opened 1 January 1930. It was not until 1942 when the line became part of the heavier metro network. The station retains a turning loop for trams which can only run forwards.

The station is the one closest to the military base Kolsås leir, which was the former home of NATO's Allied Forces Northern Europe.

The station, along with most of the Kolsås Line was closed for maintenance, between 1 July 2006 and 12 October 2014. The station was also closed for over a year between 1 July 2003 and 22 November 2004.
