= List of Oslo Metro stations =

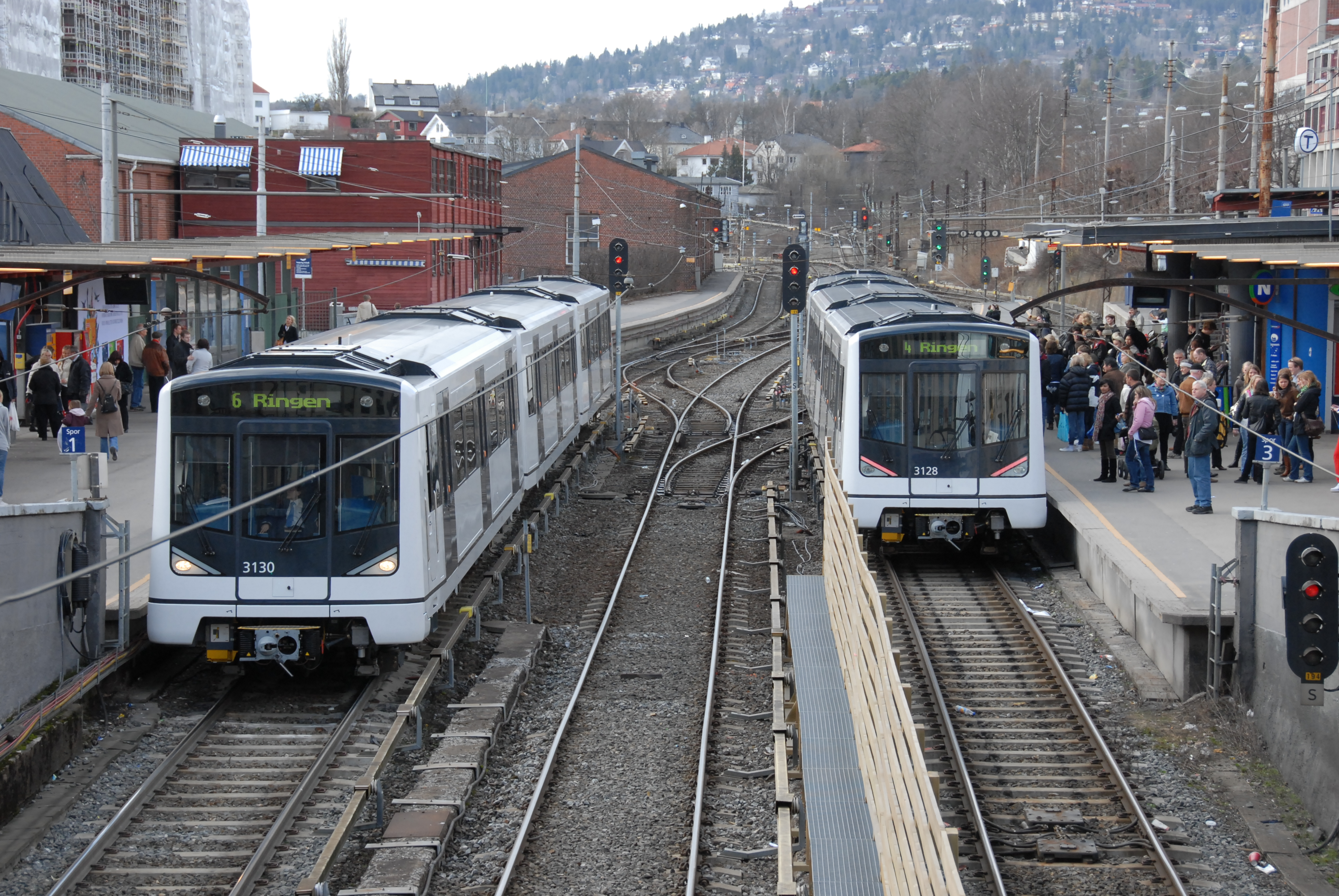
Two MX3000 trains at Majorstuen

Schematic map of the metro

Oslo Metro is the rapid transit system that serves Oslo and Bærum in Norway. The system is municipally owned by Sporveien and operated by the subsidiary Sporveien T-banen, which is in contract with Ruter. The metro served 85 million passengers and operated 7 million train-kilometers (4.3 train-mi) in 2013. It serves 95 stations; of which 15 are underground and 1 is built-in. In addition, 15 stations have been closed, while 4 stations on the Kolsås Line remain temporarily nonoperational since 2006 while the line is being upgraded.

The most heavily trafficked station is Jernbanetorget, which is adjacent to Oslo Central Station, closely followed by Majorstuen, the main transfer station between lines west of the city center and to several lines of the Oslo Tramway, and Nationaltheatret, which is in the heart of the city center and provides direct transfer to trains on the Drammen Line. All three stations are in the Common Tunnel. The least-used station is Lillevann, which serves the recreational area of Nordmarka. At a distance of 17.3 kilometers (10.7 mi), Kolsås is the farthest from the city center.

The system is served by eight lines that operate as branches from the Common Tunnel—the shared section that runs 4.8 kilometers (3.0 mi) through the city center. The Ring Line operates in a loop north of the city center. There are six train services, numbered 1 through 6, that each operate from one branch via the city center to another branch or to the Ring Line. All services run every 15 minutes. Each branch, except for the Lambertseter Line, has one service that operates to its terminus. Because the lines gradually merge as they near the Common Tunnel, stations close to the city center may be served by multiple numbers.

The original section of the metro was the Holmenkollen Line, which opened as a suburban tramway in 1898. The Røa Line was the next to open as a branch, in 1912. The system became the first Nordic underground railway in 1928, when the underground line to Nationaltheatret was opened. The Østensjø Line opened in 1923, the Sognsvann Line in 1934, and the Kolsås Line in 1942. The opening of the upgraded metro system in the eastern boroughs occurred in 1966, after the conversion of the 1957 Lambertseter Line to metro standard. This involved the implementation of automatic train protection, longer platforms, replacement of the overhead wires with third rail and removal of level crossings. This was followed by the conversion of the Østensjø Line to metro standard, as well as the new Grorud Line and the Furuset Line. From 1987 to 1993, trains terminated at Stortinget, which has since then been the basis for the kilometer markers. In 1993, for the first time, trains ran through the city between the two networks in the Common Tunnel. The latest extension is the 2006 opening of the Ring Line, which connects the eastern and western network north of the city center. Between 2006 and 2010, the older T1000 stock was replaced with MX3000 trains.

== Stations ==
The following table lists the name of each station; the line the station is located on; the services (1 through 6); the date the station opened, and, if applicable, closed; the average daily number of boarding passengers in 2001 and 2002 (except for stations on the Ring Line, where the figures are from 2007); the distance from Stortinget; and the grade—whether the station is underground, built-in or above ground (at-grade). Seven stations function as transfer stations between lines. Seven stations allow transfer to the Oslo Tramway, and two stations allow transfer to the national rail network. The list excludes planned stations, but includes former stations that have been closed.

Key
| | Terminal station |
| ✖ | Closed station |
| Oslo Metro | Interchange with other T-bane lines |
| Trams in Oslo | Interchange with the Oslo Tramway |
| rail transport in Norway | Interchange with the national rail network |

| Station | Line | Service | Opened/closed | Usage | Distance | | Grade | Ref |
| Station | Line | Service | Opened/closed | Usage | km | mi | Grade | Ref |
|---|---|---|---|---|---|---|---|---|
| Ammerud | Grorud | Oslo Metro | 16 October 1966 | 816 | 10.6 | 6.6 | At-grade | |
| Åsjordet | Kolsås | Oslo Metro | 15 June 1942 | 529 | 7.4 | 4.6 | At-grade | |
| Avløs | Kolsås | Oslo Metro | 1 July 1924 | 420 | 13.6 | 8.5 | At-grade | |
| Bekkestua | Kolsås | Oslo Metro | 1 July 1924 | 1,126 | 11.4 | 7.1 | At-grade | |
| Berg | Sognsvann | Oslo Metro | 10 October 1934 | 734 | 6.1 | 3.8 | At-grade | |
| Bergkrystallen | Lambertseter | Oslo Metro | 28 April 1957 | 796 | 10.5 | 6.5 | At-grade | |
| Besserud | Holmenkollen | Oslo Metro | 31 May 1898 | 226 | 9.1 | 5.7 | At-grade | |
| Bjørnsletta ✖ | Kolsås | — | 15 June 1942 – 1 July 2006 | 509 | 7.8 | 4.8 | At-grade | |
| Bjørnsletta | Kolsås | Oslo Metro | 17 August 2010 | 744 | 8.2 | 5.1 | At-grade | |
| Blindern | Sognsvann | Oslo Metro | 10 October 1934 | 4,989 | 4.0 | 2.5 | At-grade | |
| Bogerud | Østensjø | Oslo Metro | 29 October 1967 | 1,102 | 10.2 | 6.3 | At-grade | |
| Bøler | Østensjø | Oslo Metro | 20 July 1958 | 1,574 | 9.2 | 5.7 | At-grade | |
| Borgen | Røa | Oslo Metro | 17 November 1912 | 934 | 3.8 | 2.4 | At-grade | |
| Brattlikollen | Lambertseter | Oslo Metro | 28 April 1957 | 731 | 7.8 | 4.8 | At-grade | |
| Brynseng | Common | Oslo Metro | 22 May 1966 | 3,308 | 4.6 | 2.9 | At-grade | |
| Carl Berners plass | Grorud | Oslo Metro | 16 October 1966 | 2,245 | 3.3 | 2.1 | Underground | |
| Egne hjem ✖ | Kolsås | — | 1 July 1924 – 1 July 2006 | 193 | 10.8 | 6.7 | At-grade | |
| Eiksmarka | Røa | Oslo Metro | 3 December 1951 | 524 | 8.9 | 5.5 | At-grade | |
| Ekraveien | Røa | Oslo Metro | 22 December 1948 | 604 | 7.9 | 4.9 | At-grade | |
| Ellingsrudåsen | Furuset | Oslo Metro | 8 November 1981 | 1,290 | 12.0 | 7.5 | Underground | |
| Engerjordet ✖ | Holmenkollen | — | 1905–1935 | — | — | | At-grade | |
| Ensjø | Common | Oslo Metro | 22 May 1966 | 3,331 | 3.0 | 1.9 | At-grade | |
| Forskningsparken | Sognsvann | Oslo Metro | 22 August 1999 | 1,551 | 4.6 | 2.9 | At-grade | |
| Frøen | Holmenkollen | Oslo Metro | 31 May 1898 | 376 | 3.4 | 2.1 | At-grade | |
| Frognerseteren | Holmenkollen | Oslo Metro | 16 May 1916 | 188 | 14.4 | 8.9 | At-grade | |
| Furuset | Furuset | Oslo Metro | 19 February 1978 | 2,207 | 10.8 | 6.7 | Underground | |
| Gaustad | Holmenkollen | Oslo Metro | 31 May 1898 | 745 | 4.7 | 2.9 | At-grade | |
| Gjettum | Kolsås | Oslo Metro | 1 January 1930 | 291 | 15.5 | 9.6 | At-grade | |
| Gjønnes | Kolsås | Oslo Metro | 1 January 1930 | 169 | 11.8 | 7.3 | At-grade | |
| Godlia | Østensjø | Oslo Metro | 10 January 1926 | 698 | 6.1 | 3.8 | At-grade | |
| Grini ✖ | Røa | — | 22 December 1948 – 5 February 1995 | — | 8.4 | 5.2 | At-grade | |
| Gråkammen | Holmenkollen | Oslo Metro | 31 May 1898 | 298 | 6.7 | 4.2 | At-grade | |
| Grønland | Common | Oslo Metro | 22 May 1966 | 7,917 | 1.0 | 0.62 | Underground | |
| Grorud | Grorud | Oslo Metro | 16 October 1966 | 2,172 | 11.3 | 7.0 | At-grade | |
| Gulleråsen | Holmenkollen | Oslo Metro | 31 May 1898 | 222 | 7.1 | 4.4 | At-grade | |
| Hasle | Grorud | Oslo Metro | 16 October 1966 | 1,146 | 4.6 | 2.9 | At-grade | |
| Haslum | Kolsås | Oslo Metro | 1 July 1924 | 419 | 13.0 | 8.1 | At-grade | |
| Hauger | Kolsås | Oslo Metro | 1 January 1930 | 506 | 16.5 | 10.3 | At-grade | |
| Haugerud | Furuset | Oslo Metro | 18 November 1970 | 1,499 | 7.5 | 4.7 | At-grade | |
| Heggeli ✖ | Røa | — | 17 November 1912 – 18 May 1995 | — | 4.2 | 2.6 | At-grade | |
| Hellerud | Østensjø | Oslo Metro | 29 October 1967 | 1,713 | 5.5 | 3.4 | At-grade | |
| Helsfyr | Common | Oslo Metro | 22 May 1966 | 7,381 | 3.8 | 2.4 | Underground | |
| Holmen | Røa | Oslo Metro | 24 January 1935 | 571 | 6.1 | 3.8 | At-grade | |
| Holmenkollen | Holmenkollen | Oslo Metro | 16 May 1916 | 441 | 9.8 | 6.1 | At-grade | |
| Holstein | Sognsvann | Oslo Metro | 1941 | 373 | 7.8 | 4.8 | At-grade | |
| Hovseter | Røa | Oslo Metro | 24 January 1935 | 2,145 | 6.7 | 4.2 | At-grade | |
| Hoyenhall | Lambertseter | Oslo Metro | 28 April 1957 | 699 | 5.2 | 3.2 | At-grade | |
| Husebybakken ✖ | Kolsås | — | 1 August 2006 – 31 May 2008 | — | — | | At-grade | |
| Huseby skole ✖ | Røa | — | 24 January 1935 – 5 February 1995 | — | 7.0 | 4.3 | At-grade | |
| Jar | Kolsås | Oslo Metro | 1 July 1924 | 468 | 9.1 | 5.7 | At-grade | |
| Jernbanetorget | Common | Oslo Metro | 22 May 1966 | 25,584 | 0.5 | 0.31 | Underground | |
| Kalbakken | Grorud | Oslo Metro | 16 October 1966 | 1,134 | 10.1 | 6.3 | At-grade | |
| Karlsrud | Lambertseter | Oslo Metro | 28 April 1957 | 902 | 8.6 | 5.3 | At-grade | |
| Kolsås | Kolsås | Oslo Metro | 1 January 1930 | 794 | 17.3 | 10.7 | At-grade | |
| Kringsjå | Sognsvann | Oslo Metro | 10 October 1934 | 2,066 | 8.4 | 5.2 | At-grade | |
| Lambertseter | Lambertseter | Oslo Metro | 28 April 1957 | 1,351 | 9.5 | 5.9 | At-grade | |
| Lijordet | Røa | Oslo Metro | 22 December 1948 | 146 | 9.6 | 6.0 | At-grade | |
| Lillevann | Holmenkollen | Oslo Metro | 16 May 1916 | 49 | 12.8 | 8.0 | At-grade | |
| Lindeberg | Furuset | Oslo Metro | 19 February 1978 | 1,608 | 9.5 | 5.9 | Underground | |
| Linderud | Grorud | Oslo Metro | 16 October 1966 | 1,139 | 8.4 | 5.2 | At-grade | |
| Løren | Løren | Oslo Metro | 3 April 2016 | | | | Underground | |
| Lysakerelven ✖ | Kolsås | — | 15 June 1942 – 1 July 2006 | 235 | 8.4 | 5.2 | At-grade | |
| Majorstuen | Common | Oslo Metro | 31 May 1898 | 22,297 | 2.7 | 1.7 | At-grade | |
| Makrellbekken | Røa | Oslo Metro | 24 January 1935 | 564 | 5.4 | 3.4 | At-grade | |
| Manglerud | Lambertseter | Oslo Metro | 28 April 1957 | 1,728 | 6.2 | 3.9 | At-grade | |
| Midtstuen | Holmenkollen | Oslo Metro | 31 May 1898 | 463 | 8.5 | 5.3 | At-grade | |
| Montebello | Kolsås | Oslo Metro | 15 June 1942 | 778 | 6.0 | 3.7 | At-grade | |
| Mortensrud | Østensjø | Oslo Metro | 24 November 1997 | 2,077 | 13.6 | 8.5 | At-grade | |
| Munkelia | Lambertseter | Oslo Metro | 28 April 1957 | 653 | 10.0 | 6.2 | At-grade | |
| Nationaltheatret | Common | Oslo Metro | 28 June 1928 | 21,255 | 0.7 | 0.43 | Underground | |
| Nordberg ✖ | Sognsvann | — | 10 October 1934 – 5 May 1992 | — | 7.6 | 4.7 | At-grade | |
| Nydalen | Ring | Oslo Metro | 20 August 2003 | 8,420 | — | | Underground | |
| Økern | Grorud | Oslo Metro | 16 October 1966 | 2,224 | 5.4 | 3.4 | At-grade | |
| Oppsal | Østensjø | Oslo Metro | 10 January 1926 | 1,686 | 7.8 | 4.8 | At-grade | |
| Østerås | Røa | Oslo Metro | 16 November 1972 | 755 | 10.2 | 6.3 | At-grade | |
| Østhorn | Sognsvann | Oslo Metro | 10 October 1934 | 274 | 7.1 | 4.4 | At-grade | |
| Ringstabekk | Kolsås | Oslo Metro | 15 August 2011 | — | 10.2 | 6.3 | At-grade | |
| Ringstabekk | Kolsås | | 1 July 1924–1 July 2006 | 233 | 10.5 | 6.5 | At-grade | |
| Ris | Holmenkollen | Oslo Metro | 31 May 1898 | 380 | 5.3 | 3.3 | At-grade | |
| Risløkka | Grorud | Oslo Metro | 16 October 1966 | 766 | 6.5 | 4.0 | At-grade | |
| Røa | Røa | Oslo Metro | 24 January 1935 | 1,504 | 7.5 | 4.7 | At-grade | |
| Rødtvet | Grorud | Oslo Metro | 16 October 1966 | 835 | 9.5 | 5.9 | At-grade | |
| Rommen | Grorud | Oslo Metro | 17 March 1974 | 438 | 13.0 | 8.1 | At-grade | |
| Romsås | Grorud | Oslo Metro | 18 August 1974 | 1,468 | 12.0 | 7.5 | Underground | |
| Ryen | Lambertseter | Oslo Metro | 28 April 1957 | 1,050 | 6.7 | 4.2 | At-grade | |
| Sinsen | Ring | Oslo Metro | 20 August 2006 | 2,300 | — | | At-grade | |
| Skådalen | Holmenkollen | Oslo Metro | 31 May 1898 | 320 | 8.0 | 5.0 | At-grade | |
| Skogen | Holmenkollen | Oslo Metro | 16 May 1916 | 134 | 11.9 | 7.4 | At-grade | |
| Skøyenåsen | Østensjø | Oslo Metro | 10 January 1926 | 898 | 7.0 | 4.3 | At-grade | |
| Skullerud | Østensjø | Oslo Metro | 29 October 1967 | 1,258 | 11.3 | 7.0 | At-grade | |
| Slemdal | Holmenkollen | Oslo Metro | 31 May 1898 | 947 | 6.0 | 3.7 | At-grade | |
| Smestad | Røa | Oslo Metro | 17 November 1912 | 2,071 | 4.6 | 2.9 | At-grade | |
| Sognsvann | Sognsvann | Oslo Metro | 10 October 1934 | 854 | 8.7 | 5.4 | At-grade | |
| Sørbyhaugen ✖ | Røa | — | 24 January 1935 – 18 May 1995 | — | 5.1 | 3.2 | At-grade | |
| Steinerud | Holmenkollen | Oslo Metro | 31 May 1898 | 250 | 3.9 | 2.4 | At-grade | |
| Storo | Ring | Oslo Metro | 20 August 2003 | 3,630 | — | | At-grade | |
| Stortinget | Common | Oslo Metro | 9 January 1977 | 15,217 | 0.0 | 0 | Underground | |
| Stovner | Grorud | Oslo Metro | 18 August 1974 | 3,399 | 13.7 | 8.5 | Underground | |
| Tåsen | Sognsvann | Oslo Metro | 10 October 1934 | 677 | 6.8 | 4.2 | At-grade | |
| Tjernsrud ✖ | Kolsås | — | 1 July 1924 – 1 July 2006 | 261 | 9.9 | 6.2 | At-grade | |
| Tøyen | Common | Oslo Metro | 22 May 1966 | 9,967 | 2.1 | 1.3 | Underground | |
| Trosterud | Furuset | Oslo Metro | 15 December 1973 | 1,557 | 8.4 | 5.2 | Built-in | |
| Tveita | Furuset | Oslo Metro | 18 November 1970 | 2,100 | 6.4 | 4.0 | Underground | |
| Ullernåsen | Kolsås | Oslo Metro | 15 June 1942 | 584 | 6.8 | 4.2 | At-grade | |
| Ullevål stadion | Sognsvann | Oslo Metro | 10 October 1934 | 2,009 | 5.3 | 3.3 | At-grade | |
| Ulsrud | Østensjø | Oslo Metro | 20 July 1958 | 637 | 8.5 | 5.3 | At-grade | |
| Valkyrie plass ✖ | Common | — | 28 June 1928 – 7 January 1985 | — | 2.4 | 1.5 | Underground | |
| Valler ✖ | Kolsås | — | 1 January 1930 | 319 | 14.8 | 9.2 | At-grade | |
| Veitvet | Grorud | Oslo Metro | 16 October 1966 | 1,386 | 8.4 | 5.2 | At-grade | |
| Vestgrensa ✖ | Sognsvann | — | 10 October 1934 – 22 August 1999 | — | 4.7 | 2.9 | At-grade | |
| Vestli | Grorud | Oslo Metro | 21 December 1975 | 1,087 | 15.1 | 9.4 | At-grade | |
| Vettakollen | Holmenkollen | Oslo Metro | 31 May 1898 | 195 | 7.6 | 4.7 | At-grade | |
| Vinderen | Holmenkollen | Oslo Metro | 31 May 1898 | 941 | 4.3 | 2.7 | At-grade | |
| Voksenkollen | Holmenkollen | Oslo Metro | 16 May 1916 | 217 | 13.7 | 8.5 | At-grade | |
| Voksenlia | Holmenkollen | Oslo Metro | 16 May 1916 | 274 | 10.8 | 6.7 | At-grade | |
| Vollebekk | Grorud | Oslo Metro | 16 October 1966 | 774 | 10.9 | 6.8 | At-grade | |
| Volvat ✖ | Røa | — | 1939 – 7 April 1997 | — | 3.4 | 2.1 | Underground | |

== Gallery ==
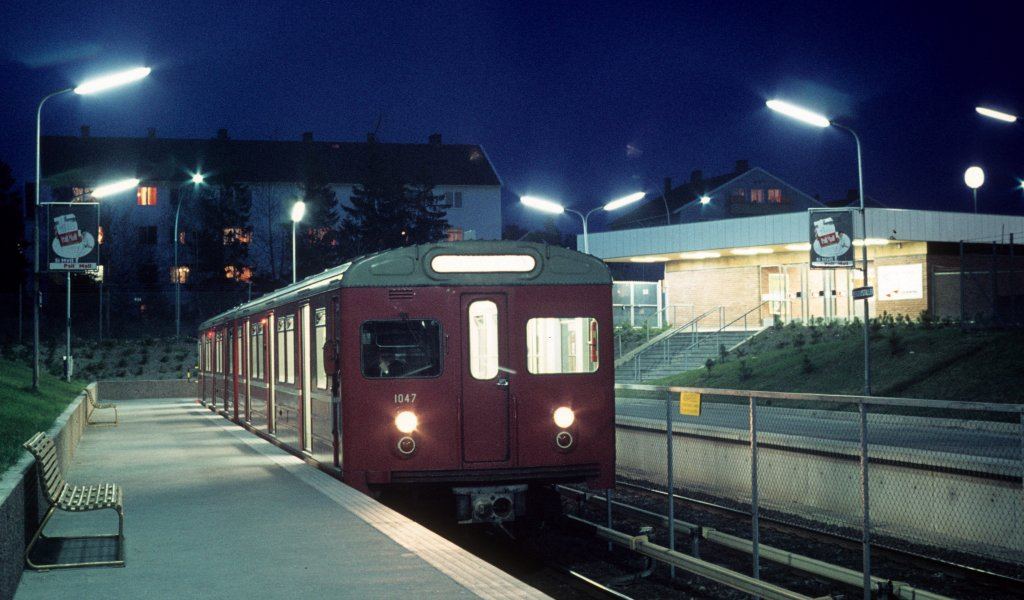
T1000 train at Bergkrystallen in 1971, five years after it opened

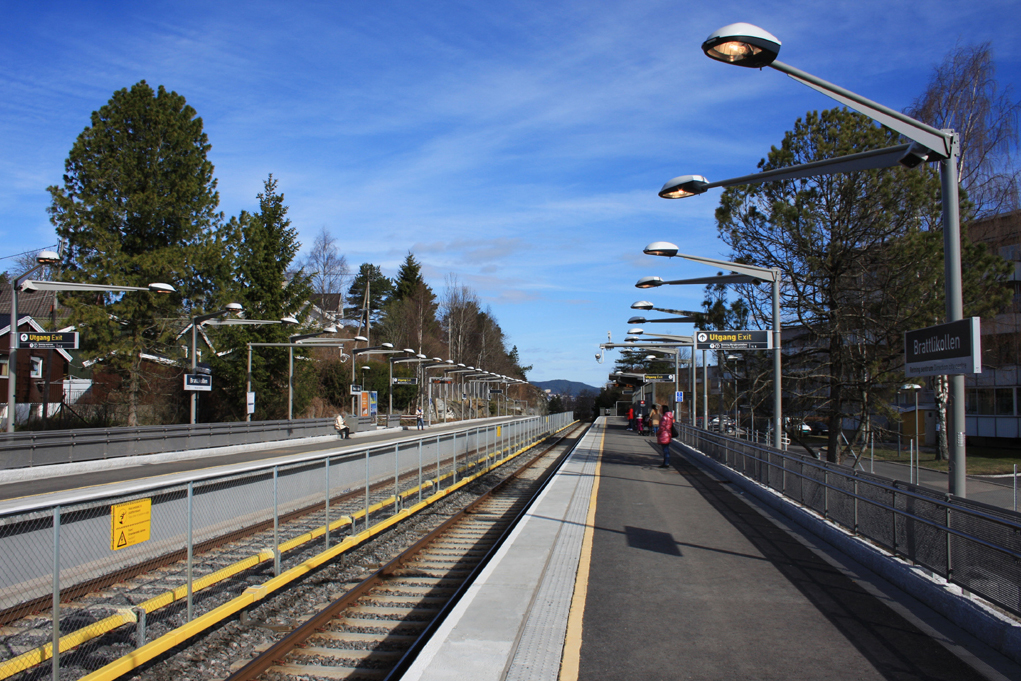
Brattlikollen after its 2013 renovation

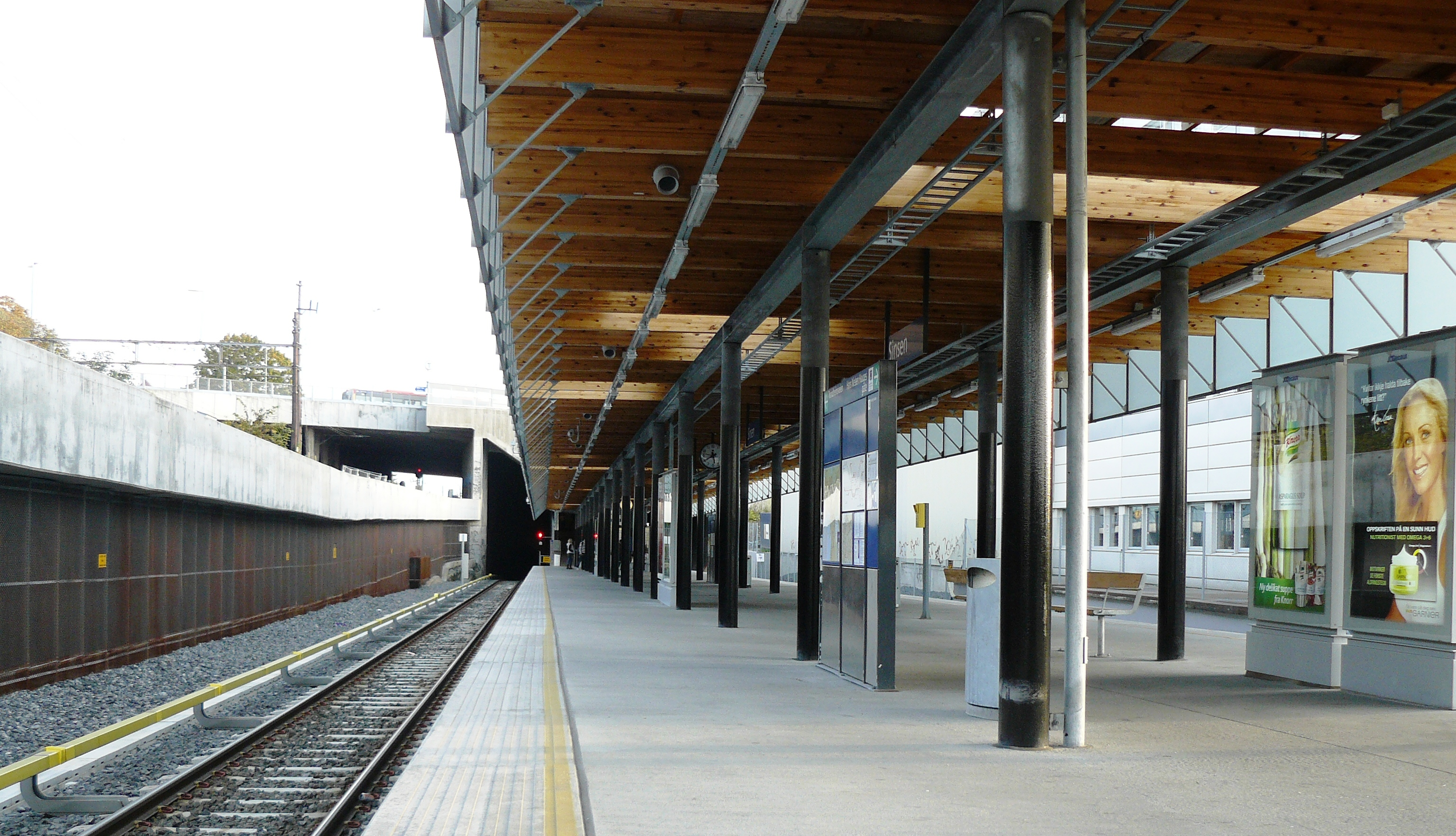
The Ring Line's Sinsen is the latest addition not built along an existing line

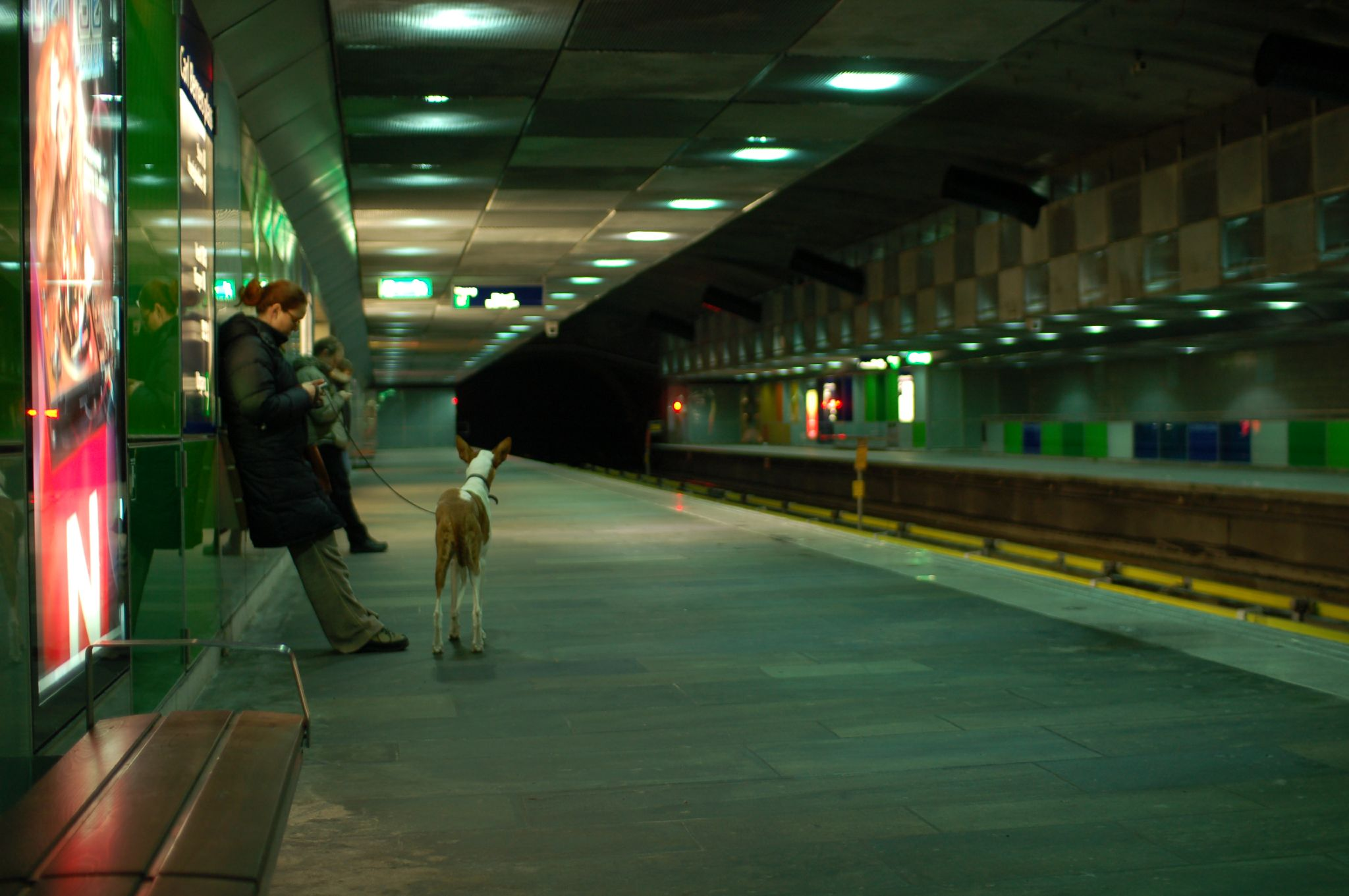
Carl Berners Plass

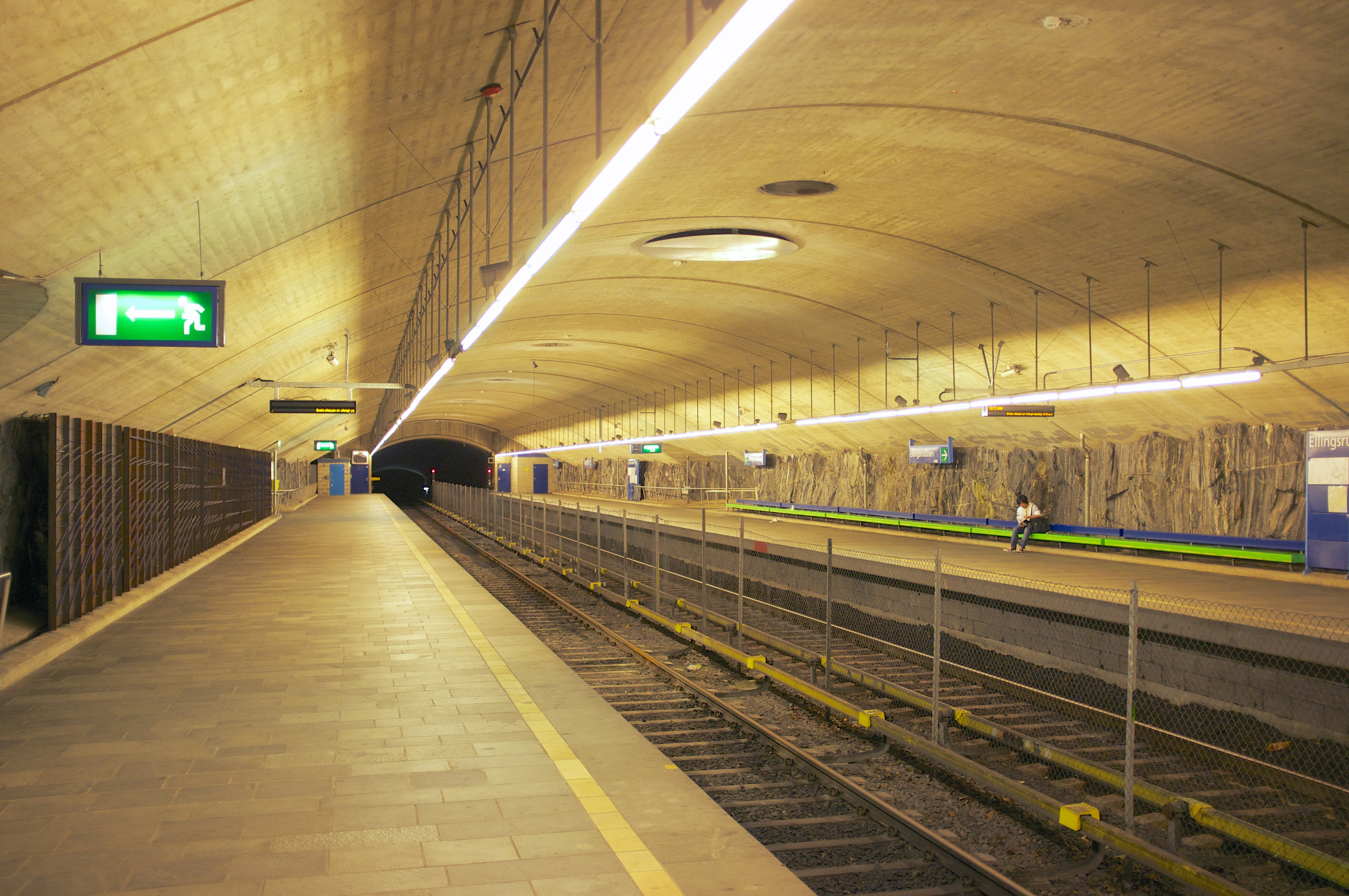
Ellingsrudåsen is built in a mountain cavern

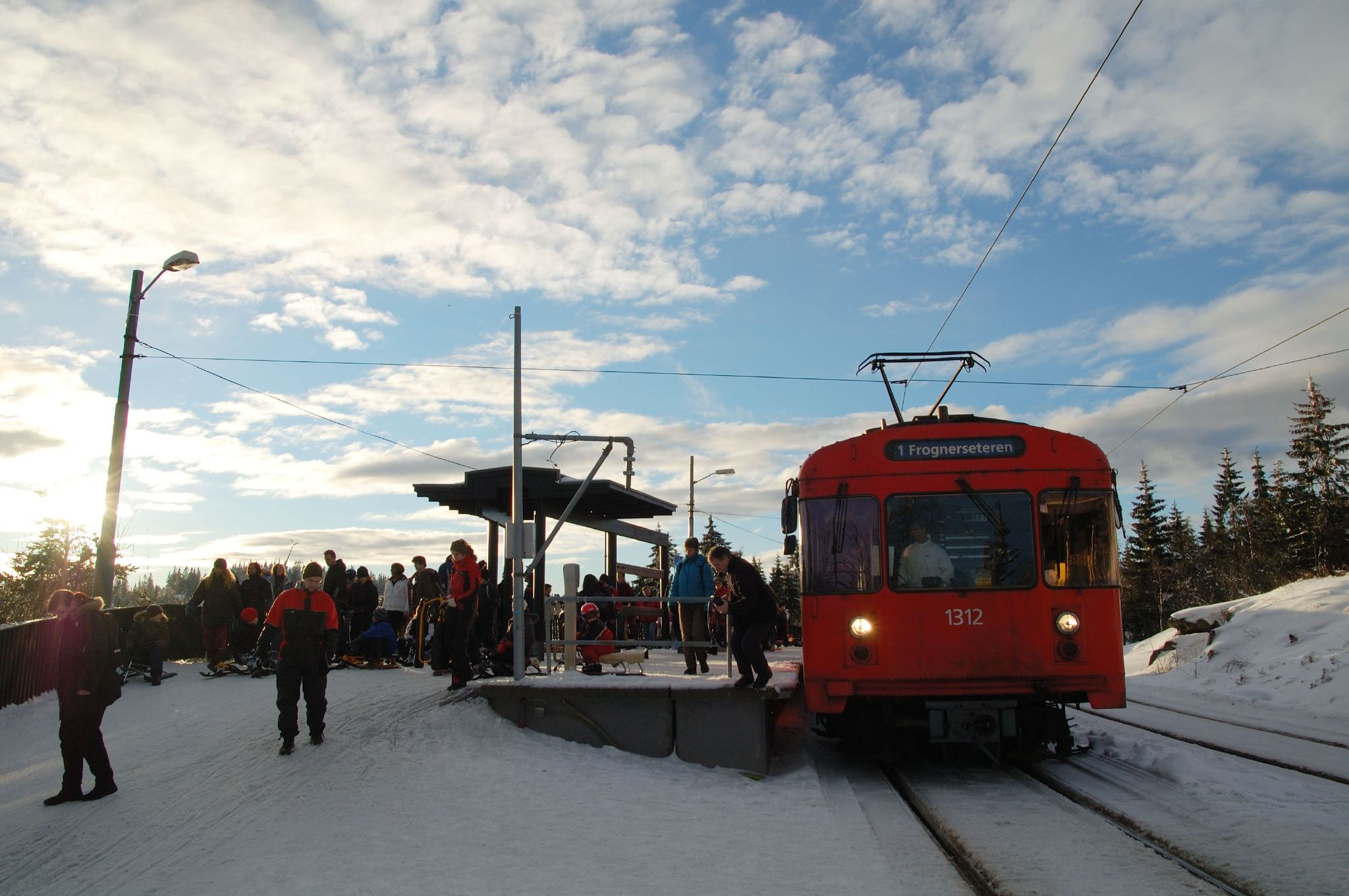
Frognerseteren serves the popular recreational area Nordmarka

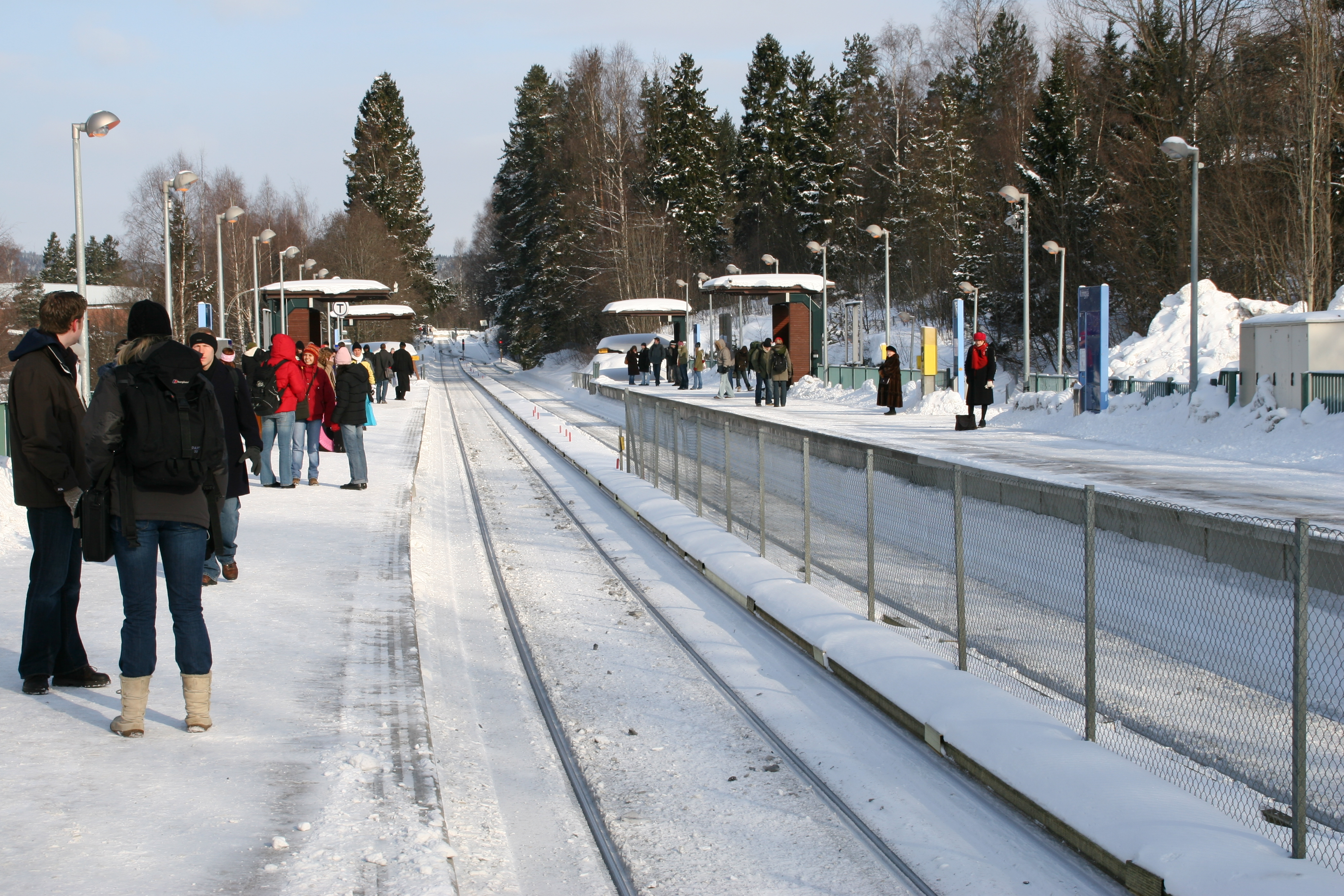
Kringsjå

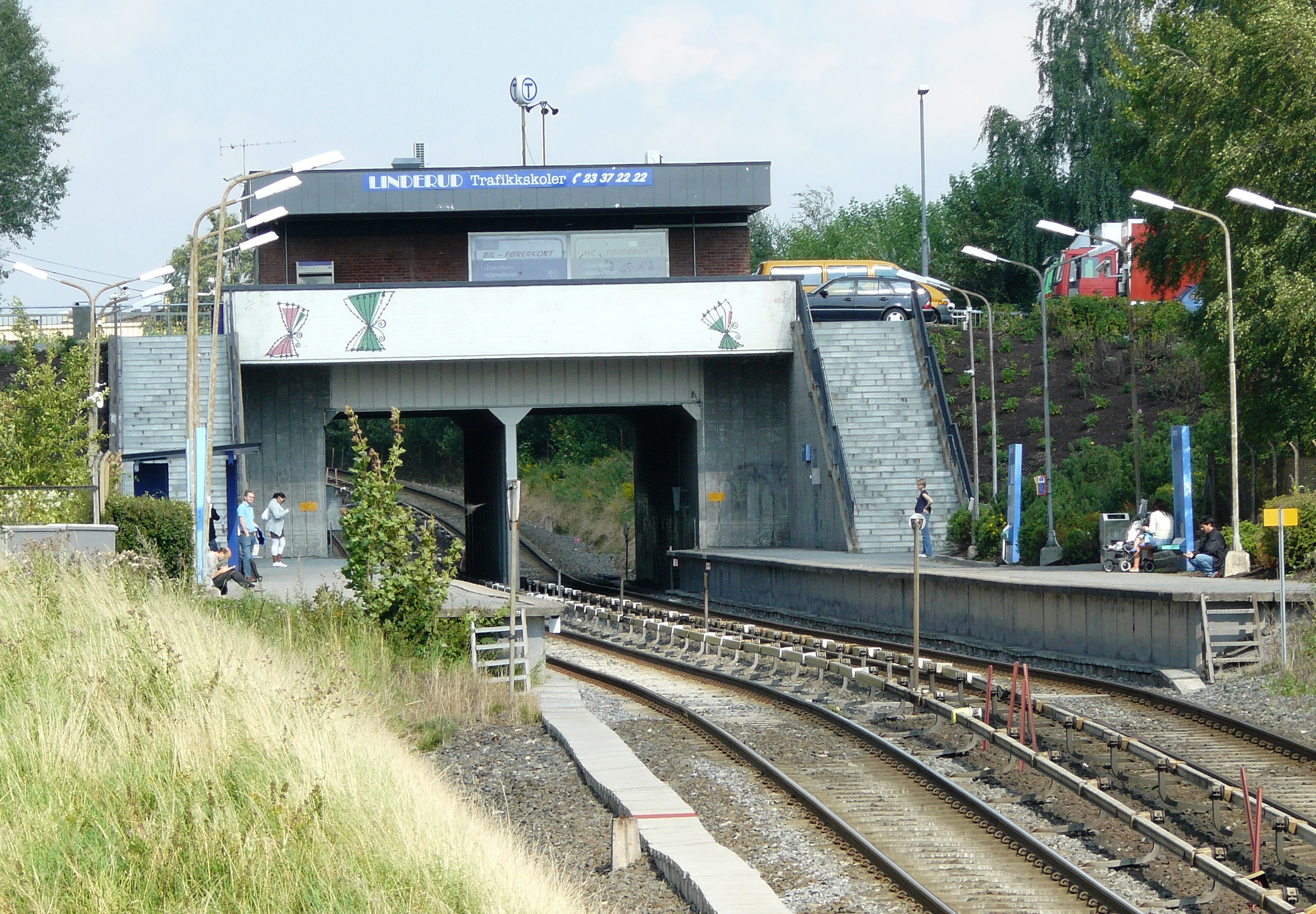
Ticket offices above the tracks were a common feature on the eastern lines, such as at Linderud

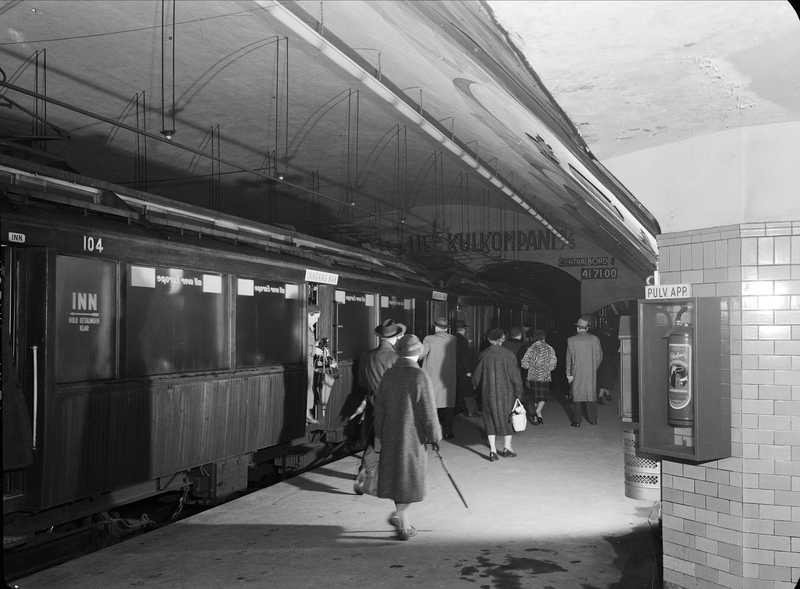
Passengers disembarking at Nationaltheatret, the first underground station in the Nordic Countries

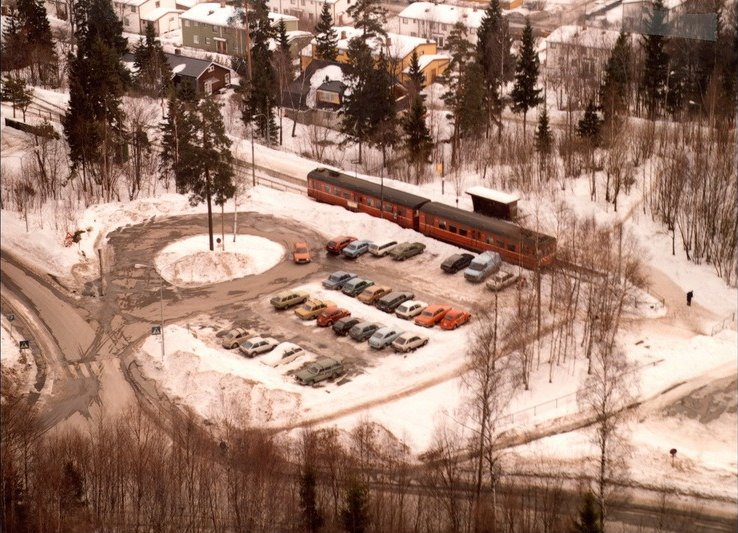
Aerial view of Østerås, the terminus of the Røa Line

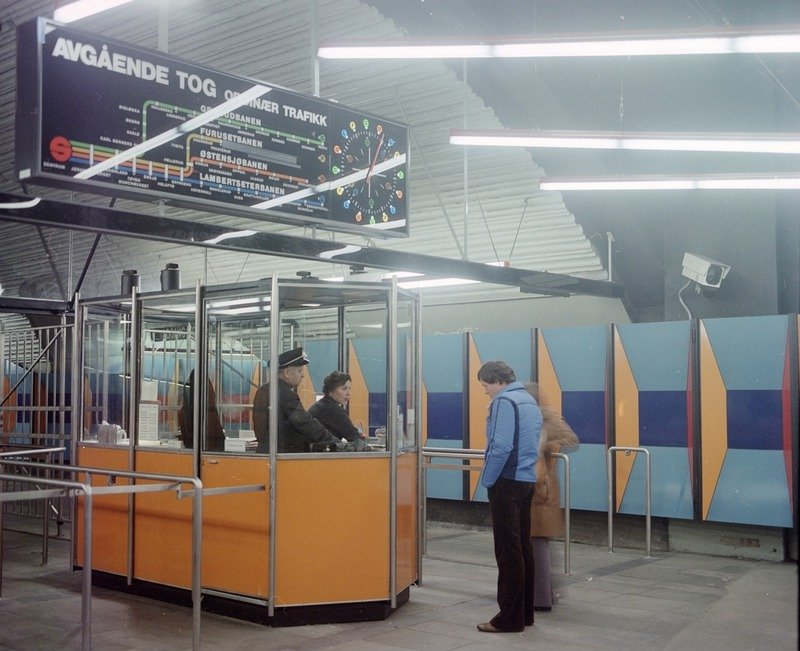
Ticket bars at Stortinget in 1977

== Bibliography ==
- Aspenberg, Nils Carl (1994). Trikker og forstadsbaner i Oslo (in Norwegian). Oslo: Baneforlaget. ISBN 82-91448-03-5.
- Aspenberg, Nils Carl (1995). Neste stopp Makrellbakken: Historien om Røabanen. Oslo: Baneforlaget. ISBN 82-91448-18-3.
- Bjerke, Thor; Holom, Finn (2004). Banedata 2004 (in Norwegian). Hamar / Oslo: Norsk Jernbanemuseum / Norsk Jernbaneklubb. ISBN 82-90286-28-7. Archived from the original on 2015-06-12.
- Haldsrud, Stian (2013). Banen og byen (in Norwegian). Oslo: Storbyforlaget. ISBN 978-82-999426-0-7.
- Stang, Johan L. (1980). Sogn – en del av Oslo (in Norwegian). Tiden Norsk Forlag. ISBN 82-10-02012-9.
