= Huseby skole (station) =

Former Oslo metro station

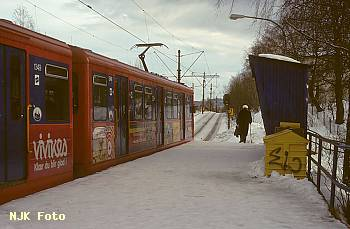
- Huseby Skole station when it was still open

General information
- Location: Vestre Aker, Aker (1935-1948); Oslo (1948-); Norway
- Coordinates: 59.9461°N 10.6486°E
- Elevation: 133.4 m (438 ft)
- Line: Røa Line
- Distance: 7.0 km (4.3 mi)

Construction
- Structure type: At-grade

History
- Opened: 24 January 1935
- Closed: 1995
Location

Huseby skole is a former metro station on the Røa Line of the Oslo Metro.

The station was located between Hovseter and Røa, and was opened when the Røa Line was created, as an extension from Smestad to Røa on 24 January 1935. It was closed as a part of the Røa Line overhaul in 1995.
