= Holmen (station) =

Oslo metro station

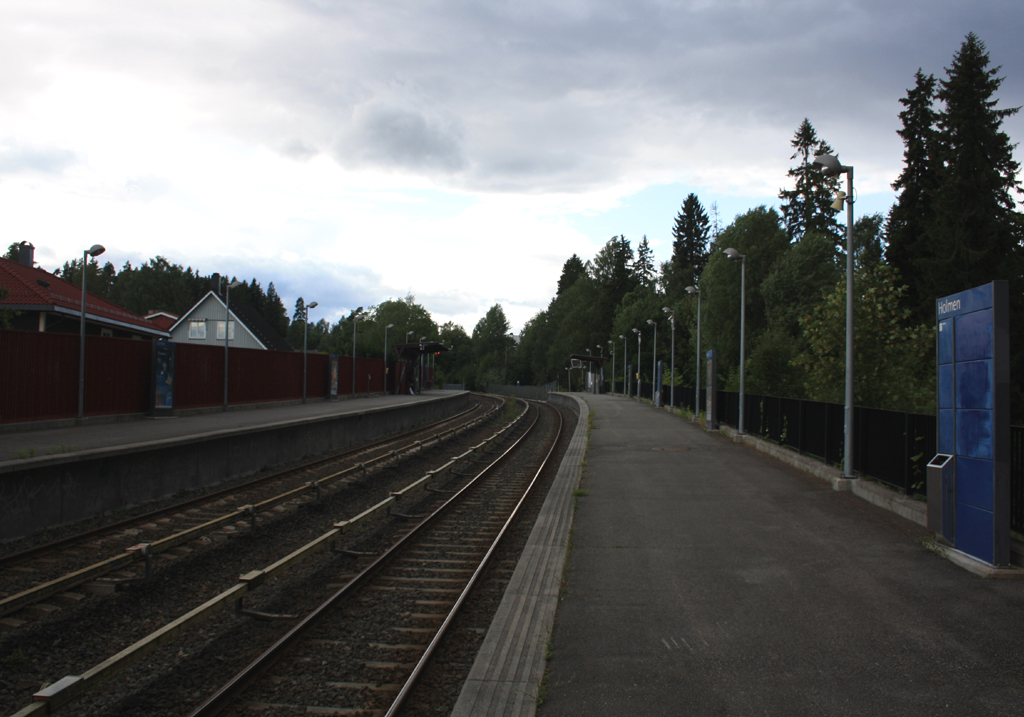

General information
- Location: Oslo; Norway
- Coordinates: 59°56′45″N 10°40′01″E
- Elevation: 119.4 m (392 ft)
- Owner: Sporveien
- Operator: Sporveien T-banen
- Line: Røa Line
- Distance: 6.1 km (3.8 mi) from Stortinget

Construction
- Structure type: At-grade
- Accessible: Yes

History
- Opened: 24 January 1935
Location

Holmen is a station on the Røa Line (line 2) of the Oslo T-bane system. It is located between Makrellbekken and Hovseter and serves the neighbourhood of Holmen. The station is 6.1 km from Stortinget. Holmen was opened on 24 January 1935 when the line was completed to Røa. The station is at an altitude of 119.4 metres above sea level. The station is located in a mainly residential area.

The Oslo subway system has fought a battle against graffiti, and one of the incidents turned violent on 2 February 2007, when a subway driver was beaten by a vandal.

Preceding station	Oslo Metro	Following station
Hovseter towards Østerås	Line 2	Makrellbekken towards Ellingsrudåsen
