= Smestad, Oslo =

History of a district in Norway

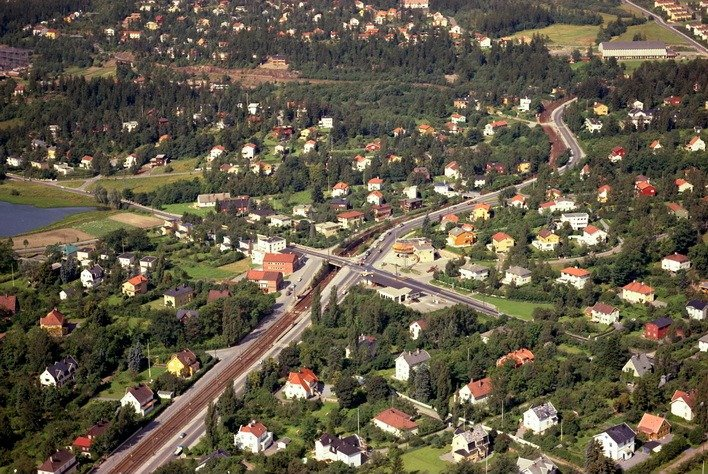
Røa Line through Smestad in Oslo.

Smestad is a historically wealthy area in the borough Vestre Aker in Oslo, Norway. It is named after the Smestad Mansion and family, and was parcelled out for residences after the tram line was built in 1912. The district is located between north of Hoff and Skøyen, east of Montebello in Ullern, west of the Frogner Park and south of Heggeli. It is served by Smestad station.

== Smestad Elementary School ==
Smestad Elementary School, was founded on 31 January 1939 and has around 690 students today. The school was temporarily closed on 20. April 1940 when 70 German soldiers occupied the school and erected barbed wire around it. When the school opened on 21. November 1945, King Olav gave a speech at the school and enrolled his son. The alumni include King Harald V, Princess Märtha Louise and Crown Prince Haakon.

== Smestad station ==
Smestad is a station shared by the Røa Line (line 5) and the Kolsås Line (line 2) on the Oslo T-bane system. Although the two lines continue to share track some time after Smestad, passing the former station of Sørbyhaugen which was also shared, they diverge before passing another station. The next station to the west is Makrellbekken on Røabanen and the temporary station of Husebybakken on Kolsåsbanen. The next station to the east is Borgen. Smestad is located 4.6 km from Stortinget.

== Smestad mansion ==
Smestad Mansion is the main house of the former Smestad estate, located on Monolitveien 46, and rebuilt in its current "Swiss Villa" stile in the late 1800s by Carl Smestad. The estate was the largest farm in the Aker district of Oslo and covers the district in Oslo known as Smestad today. It has its origins in the 1100s as Hovedøya Kloster, later crown estate, and got its current name in 1682 after it was changed by Henrich Lachmann who sold the farm to Jacob Olssøn Smestad in 1706.

The estate was split in 1728 into Upper and Lower Smestad, with the former being bought by Aker Municipality in 1922 which parcelled it into residences. Lower Smestad, at 91,3 hectares land and 3,2 hectares ponds, was developed into a residential area by the Smestad family trust primarily during the 1970s and 80's with the last buildings erected in the old driveway in 1989.

== Smestad ponds ==
The Smestad ponds are man made ponds which were dug out during the late 1800s by Carl Smestad to provide the bourgeoisie of Oslo with ice for refrigeration throughout much of the year. This was a lucrative trade with notable customers such as the Grand Hotel on Karl Johans Gate, in particular due to the ponds central location. Ice halls were built in the 1880s for storage and export.
