= Makrellbekken =

Makrellbekken Markskillebekken
- Neighbourhood
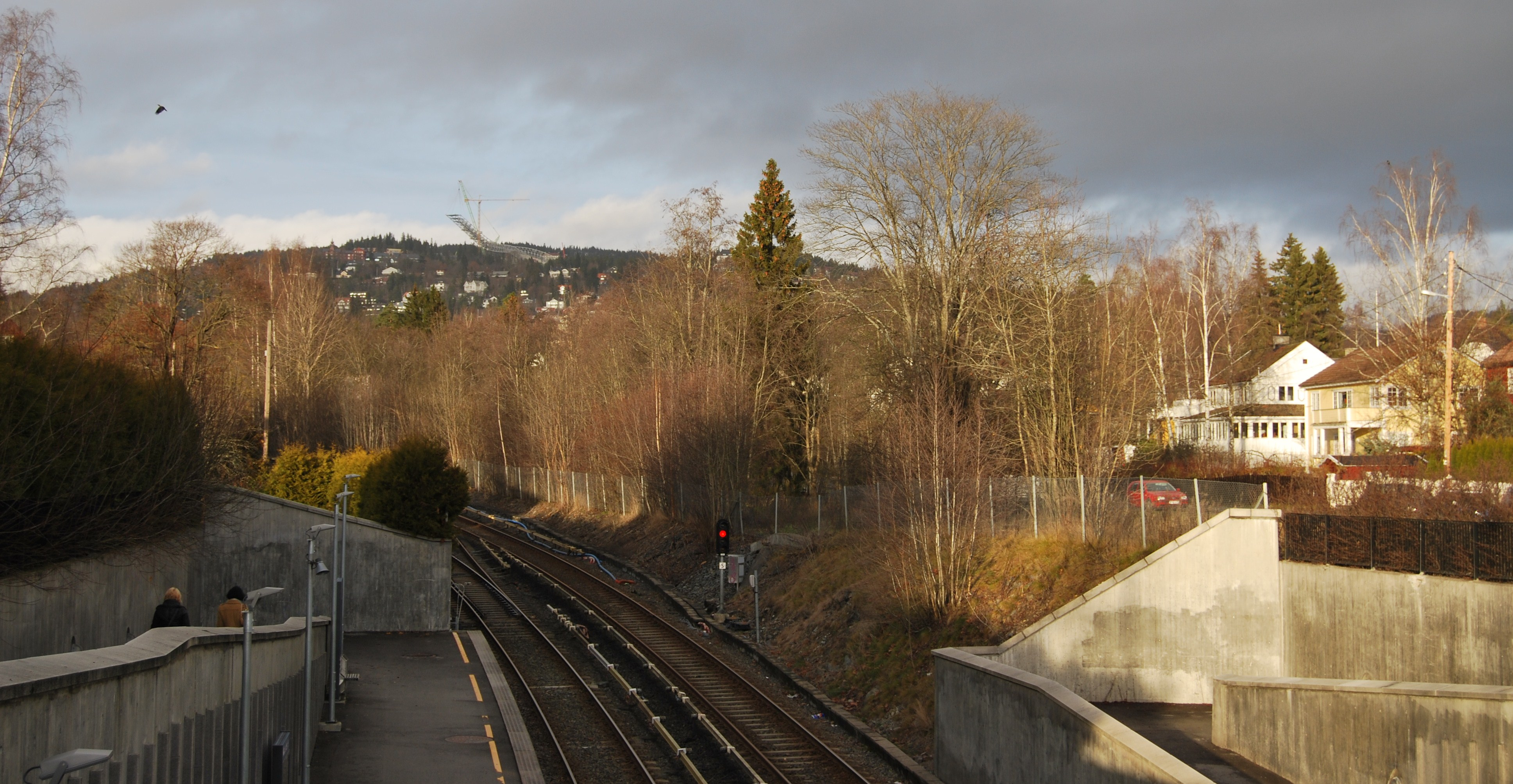
- View from the Metro station towards Holmenkollen
- Interactive map of Makrellbekken
- Coordinates: 59.942°N 10.674°E
- Country: Norway
- County: Oslo
- Municipality: Oslo
- Borough: Vestre Aker, Ullern
- Time zone: UTC+1 (CET)
  - Summer (DST): UTC+2 (CEST)
- Postal codes: 0376

Makrellbekken is a neighbourhood in the Oslo borough of Vestre Aker in Norway, bordering the borough of Ullern. It is located between Smestad and Holmen. The main road is Sørkedalsveien, a part of Norwegian National Road 168. The place is served by the Røa Line (Line 2) of Oslo Metro.

== Etymology ==
The name is derived from the stream Makrellbekken which runs through the area from north to south, and which had already given its name to some farms in the area. These existed before the modern development, and one of their farmhouses has been transferred to the Norwegian Museum of Cultural History in Bygdøy.

== The name ==
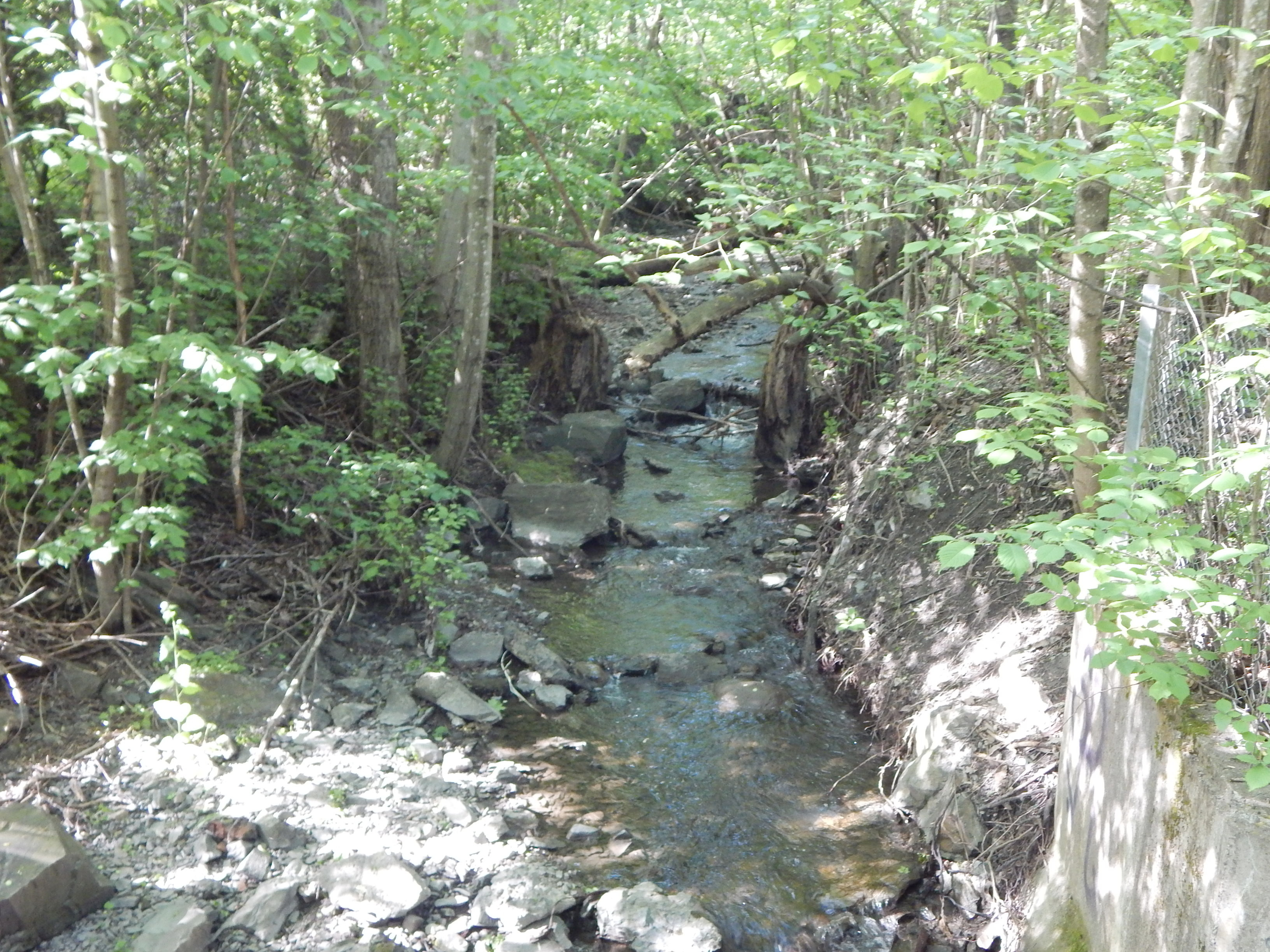
Makrellbekken (really Markskillebekken) before it flows into the river Hoffselva. The stream has also given a name to the neighborhood.

In Norwegian, the name Makrellbekken (Literally: Mackerel-stream) for many seems comical, if you realize that the fish mackerel does not live neither in streams or freshwater. However, the name has nothing to do with the fish, but is a distortion of "Markskillebekken" (Literally: The cropland-divide-stream), the former boundary stream between the farms of Huseby, Voksen, Smedstad and Holmen.

== History ==
The first business building was erected in Makrellbekken in the 1920s. The station on the suburban railway line opened on 24 January 1935 and is now served by line 2 of T-Banen. A quarry was operated in Makrellbekken before and during the German occupation of Norway, and Soviet prisoners of war were forced to work there.

== Notable buildings ==
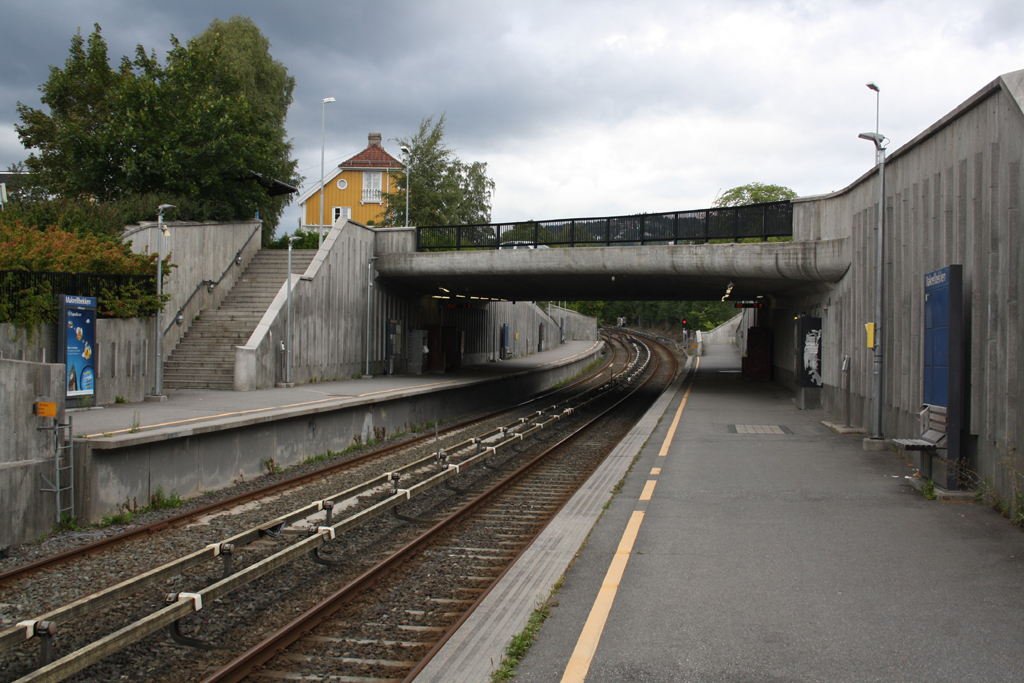
Makrellbekken Station

The Makrellbekken station is located under the bridge leading Sørkedalsveien across the suburban railway line. West of it is Njårdhallen, a sports and former concert venue, already in the Ullern borough. A statue of resistance fighter Gregers Gram stands nearby.

Next to Njårdhallen and the station, the new embassy of the United States of America was opened in May 2017.

== Sports ==
Makrellbekken is home to the sports club SK Njård. Its tennis courts are located on the place of the former quarry.
