= Makrellbekken (station) =

Oslo metro station

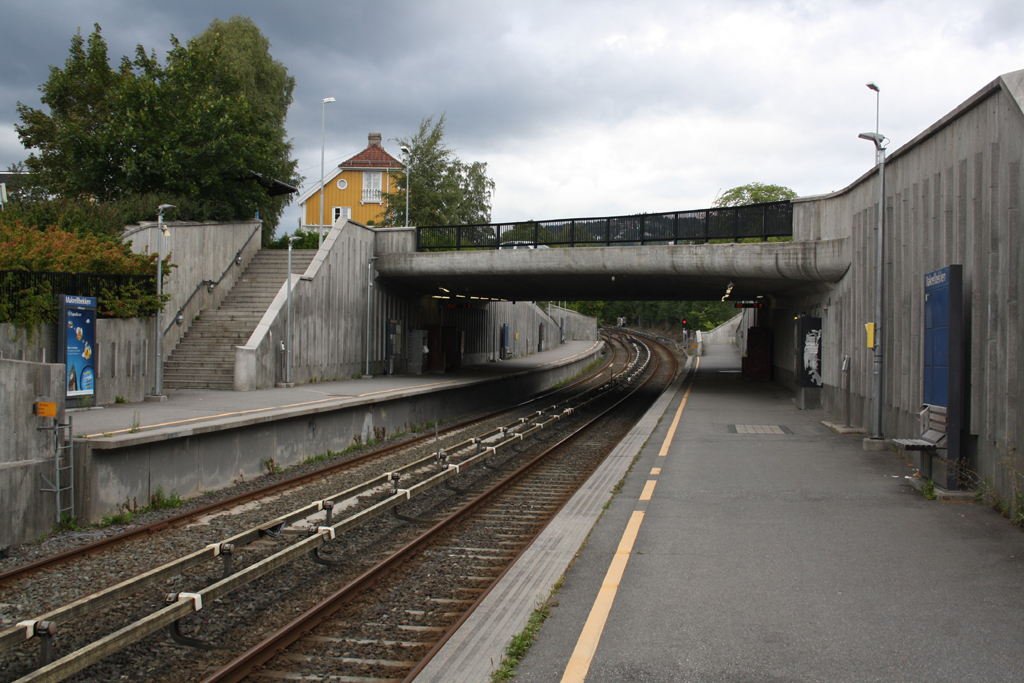

General information
- Location: Makrellbekken, Vestre Aker, Oslo; Norway
- Coordinates: 59°56′31″N 10°40′25″E
- Elevation: 99.6 m (327 ft)
- Owner: Sporveien
- Operator: Sporveien T-banen
- Line: Røa Line
- Distance: 5.4 km (3.4 mi) from Stortinget

Construction
- Structure type: At-grade
- Accessible: Yes

Other information
- Fare zone: Zone 1

History
- Opened: 24 January 1935

Services
Preceding station	Oslo Metro	Following station
Holmen towards Østerås	Line 2 Røa Line	Smestad towards Ellingsrudåsen
Location

Makrellbekken is a rapid transit station of the Oslo Metro's Røa Line (Line 2). It is situated in the neighborhood of Makrellbekken in the Vestre Aker borough of Oslo, Norway. Located 5.4 kilometers (3.4 mi) from Stortinget, the station is served by Line 2 of the metro, normally with a fifteen-minute headway. Travel time to Stortinget is 10 minutes.

The station opened on 24 January 1935 as part of the extension of the Røa Line to Røa. At Makrellbekken the Røa Line passes under Sørkedalsveien, which it has followed since Volvat. The station received a major upgrade in 1995, in which the station was lowered below the road, replacing a level crossing.

== History ==
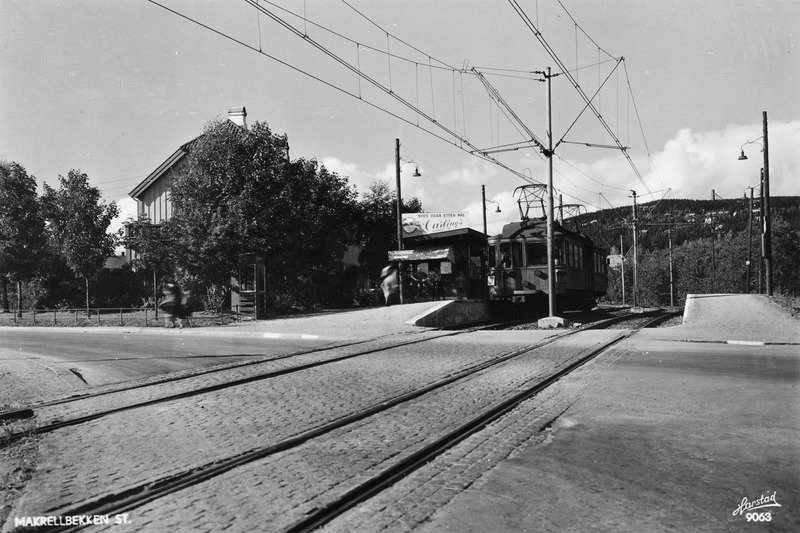
Tram calling at Makrellbekken during the opening year of 1935

Makrellbekken and the surroundings neighborhoods were opened for housing construction during the 1920s. This caught the interest of Akersbanerne, who had built the Røa Line (then known as the Smestad Line) along Sørkedalsveien to Smestad in 1912. Makrellbekken initially proposed an extension to Makrellbekken and received permission for this on 26 May 1933. A major controversy was related to the line crossing Sørkedalsveien. Many motorists and local residents feared that a level crossing would be hazardous. At Smestad the line had to be built in a cutting to pass under Ullernchauséen. This approach was not chosen at Makrellbakken.

Construction started in 1933. By then Akersbanerne was struggling financially and was taken over by Holmenkolbanen. The latter proposed that the construction be extended further westwards all the way to Røa. Government approval was granted on 29 June 1934 and construction started immediately. The whole 2.9-kilometer (1.8 mi) extension opened on 24 January 1935. The station was named for the creek of Makrellbekken which runs along the track onwards to Holmen.

The new line was initially not profitable, because Schøyens Bilcentraler had kept its concession to operate buses in the area. Not until the break-out of the Second World War was the bus route terminated. The section from Makrellbekken to Røa had initially been built with single track. This was upgraded to double track on 6 July 1939, at which time an overrun track was also installed. A level crossing with Sørkedalsveien was completed on 15 December.

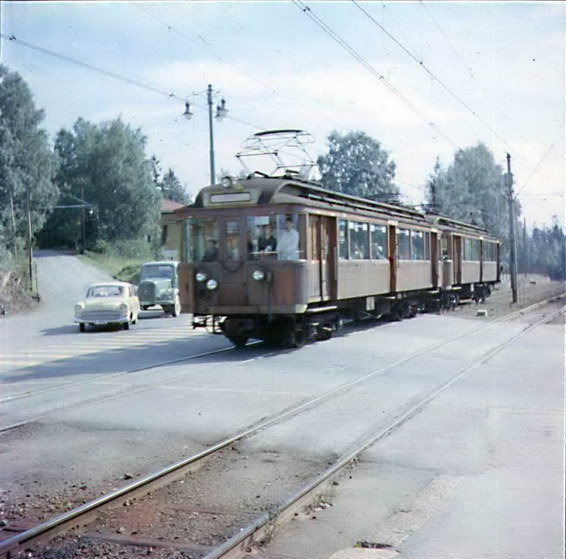
Train crossing Sørkedalsveien ahead of an Opel Kapitän in 1958

SK Njård opened its indoor arena Njårdhallen in 1960. At the time it was the largest indoor arena in the Nordic Countries. Throughout the 1960s and 1970s it remained a major concert venue for Oslo. Thereafter it became too small for larger events. Extra trains were in the period common in conjunction with sports- and music events in the hall.

The connection of the eastern and western metro network in the early 1990s meant that the Røa Line was to be upgrades to metro standard. This meant that platforms were to be extended to 110 meters (360 ft) to allow six-car metro trains. In addition to a complete renovation of the tracks, this meant that the overhead wires were replaced with a third rail. This could not be combined with a level crossing. The right-of-way was therefore lowered past Makrellbekken and Sørkedalsveien placed on an overpass over the tracks and station. This requiring several hundred meters of the line to be rebuilt.

== Service ==
The station is served by Line 2 of the Oslo Metro. During regular hours, is operates at a 15-minute headway. Travel time to Stortinget is 10 minutes. Operations are carried out by Sporveien T-banen on contract with Ruter, the public transport authority in Oslo and Akershus. The infrastructure itself is owned by Sporveien, a municipal company. Service is provided using MX3000 three- and six-car trains. The station had an average 564 boarding passengers in 2002. It is located in fare zone 1.

== Facilities ==
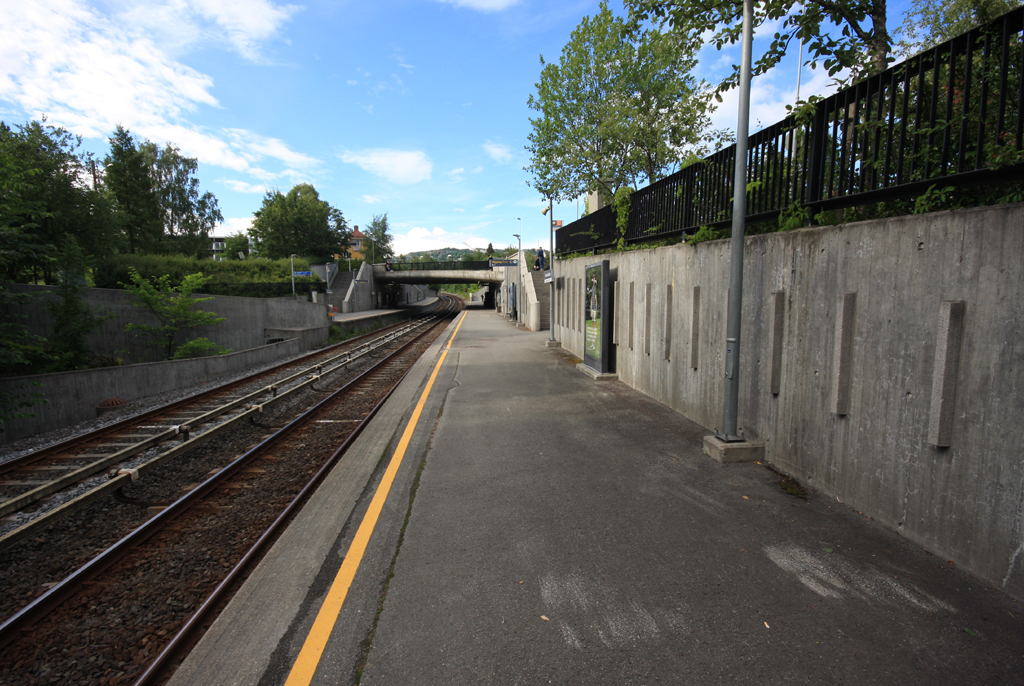
The station looking north from the northbound platform

Makrellbekken is a rapid transit station situated on the Røa Line, 5.4 kilometers (3.4 mi) from Stortinget in the city center. Makrellbekken is open ground station featuring two side platforms. It is partially situated under an overpass which carries Sørkedalsveien. The station meets the metro standard of the Oslo Metro. This includes two 120-meter (390 ft) side platforms and an overpass. The station is constructed in massive concrete. The station is situated adjacent to the sports arena Njårdhallen and the Embassy of the United States.

== Accidents and incidents ==
On 1 February 2004 an inbound train derailed at Makrellbekken after it struck a tractor with a snowplow. The cause of the accident was a wind gust blowing snow against the tractor, disorienting the driver and causing him to drive too close to the platform edge with the shovel sticking out just as the train arrived. The only injury, to the train driver, was minor. The report was critical of the metro's safety routines, pointing out that the company had failed to sufficiently caution the subcontractor of the hazards with the snow clearing task.

== See also ==
- List of wind-related railway accidents

== Biography ==
- Aspenberg, Nils Carl (1995). Neste stopp Makrellbekken: historien om Røabanen. Oslo: Baneforlaget. ISBN 82-91448-18-3.
