= Hovseter (station) =

Oslo metro station

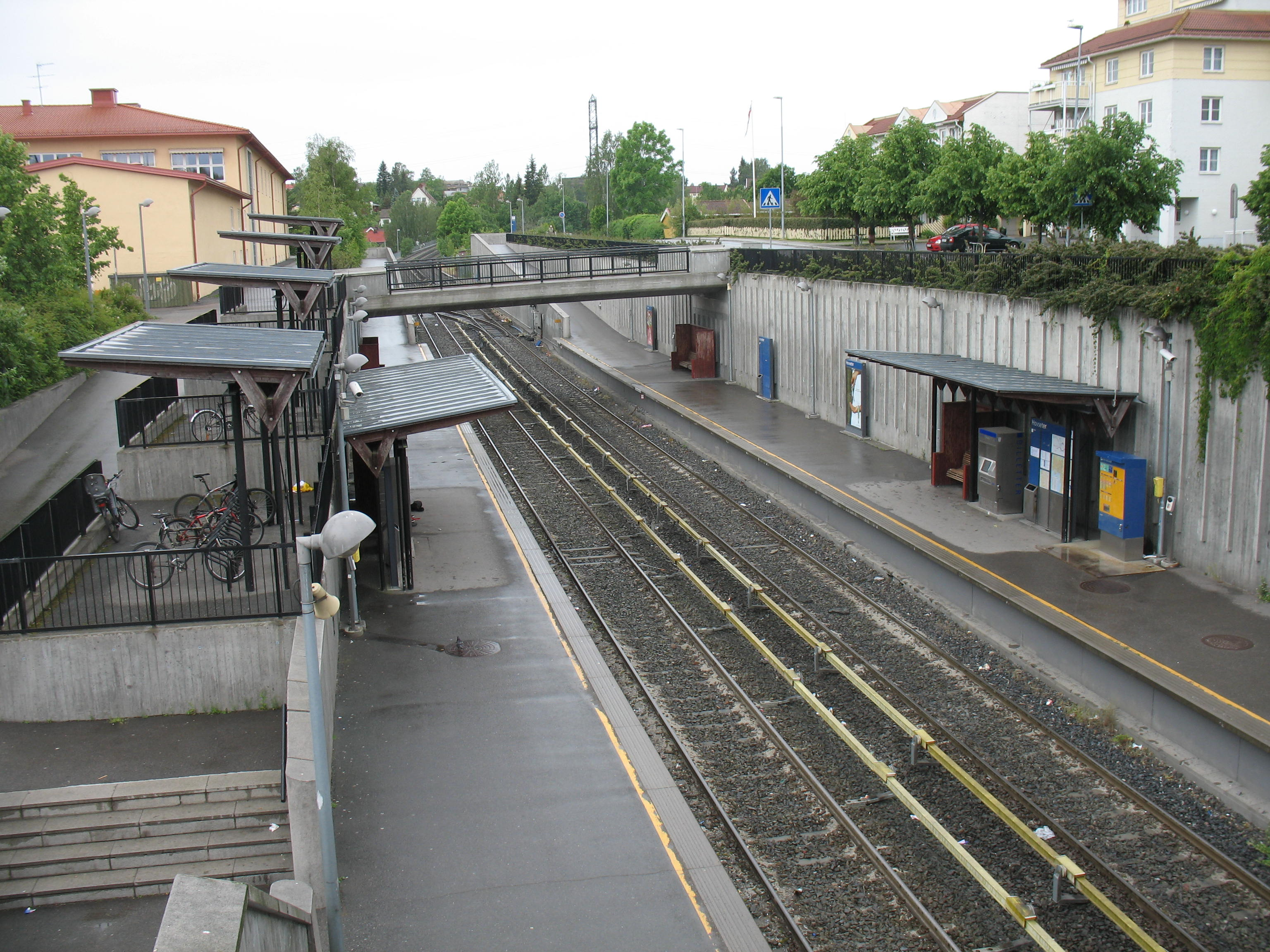
- Hovseter in June 2007

General information
- Location: Vestre Aker, Oslo; Norway
- Coordinates: 59°56′46″N 10°39′16″E
- Elevation: 135.6 m (445 ft)
- Owner: Sporveien
- Operator: Sporveien T-banen
- Line: Røa Line
- Distance: 6.7 km (4.2 mi) from Stortinget

Construction
- Structure type: At-grade
- Accessible: Yes

History
- Opened: 24 January 1935
Location

Hovseter is a station on the Røa Line of the Oslo Metro between Holmen and Røa. It is located in the Vestre Aker borough.

The station was opened on 24 January 1935 with the completion of the line to Røa. It is 135.6 metres above sea level, and 6.7 km from Stortinget.

Hovseter is one of the most densely populated areas along Røabanen, and the neighborhood has several fairly large apartment buildings, some of which are public housing. South of the station is Huseby leir, the base for Hans Majestet Kongens Garde.

Preceding station	Oslo Metro	Following station
Røa towards Østerås	Line 2	Holmen towards Ellingsrudåsen
