= Embassy of the United States, Oslo =

Diplomatic representation in Norway

United States Embassy in Oslo

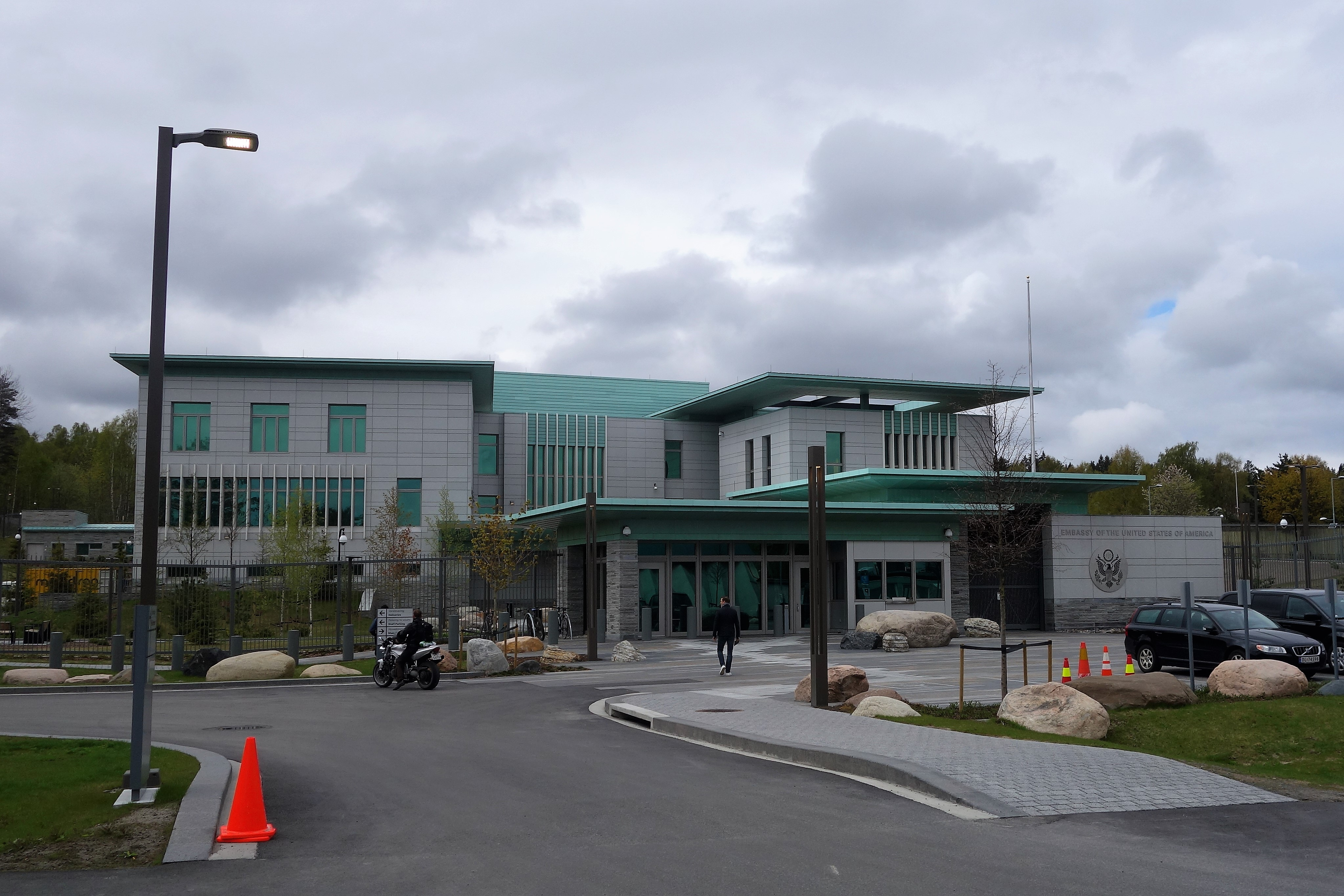
- U.S. Embassy building complex in Oslo
- Location: Makrellbekken, Oslo
- Address: Morgedalsveien 36
- Coordinates: 59°56′29″N 10°40′10″E
- Website: Oslo Embassy

The Embassy of the United States in Oslo is the diplomatic representation of the federal government of the United States to the Kingdom of Norway. Located in Oslo, the current embassy building has been in use since May 2017. The current Embassy is located in Morgedalsvegen 36, near the Makrellbekken Metro Station, in one of the city's western suburbs. Visitors to the embassy are encouraged to use public transport.

Marc B. Nathanson served as the United States ambassador to Norway from June 2022 to February 2024.

== Norwegian-American diplomatic history ==
With the dissolution of Sweden–Norway in 1905, the US became one of the first countries to establish diplomatic ties with Norway, that same year. During the Nazi German occupation of Norway in World War II, the United States had no diplomatic representation in Oslo, but the separate ambassador to Norway had diplomatic contact with the Norwegian government-in-exile in London. The Embassy was staffed again right after the war.

The relationship between the United States and Norway is characterized by a long history as partners, friends and allies.

== Architectural history ==
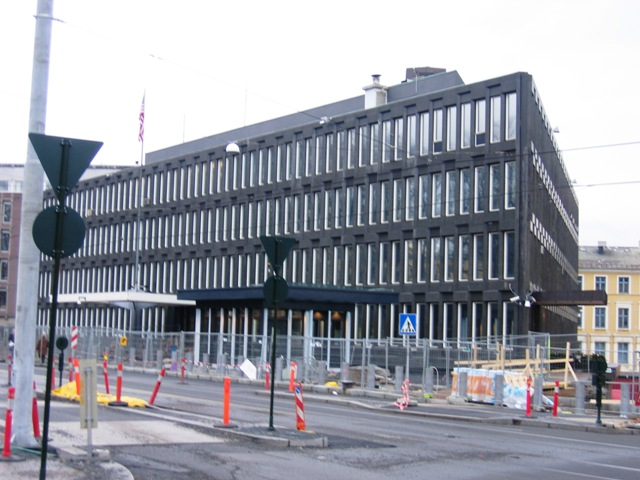
The former embassy is located on Henrik Ibsens gate in central Oslo.

The former embassy chancery on Henrik Ibsens gate in downtown Oslo was designed by Finnish–American architect Eero Saarinen, who also designed the American embassy in London and the Gateway Arch in Saint Louis, Missouri. It was completed in 1959, four years after Saarinen was first selected for the project. The base of the building forms a horizontal triangle with a dark exterior, which lead to poor circulation and offices with abnormal shapes but also gave it a modern appeal and was well-suited for receptions. Physical security measures, including a fence surrounding the chancery, were added after the September 11, 2001 attacks in the U.S.

As of June 2016, some of the windows had the colors corresponding to those of the Rainbow Flag to give recognition to Pride Month.

=== New chancery ===
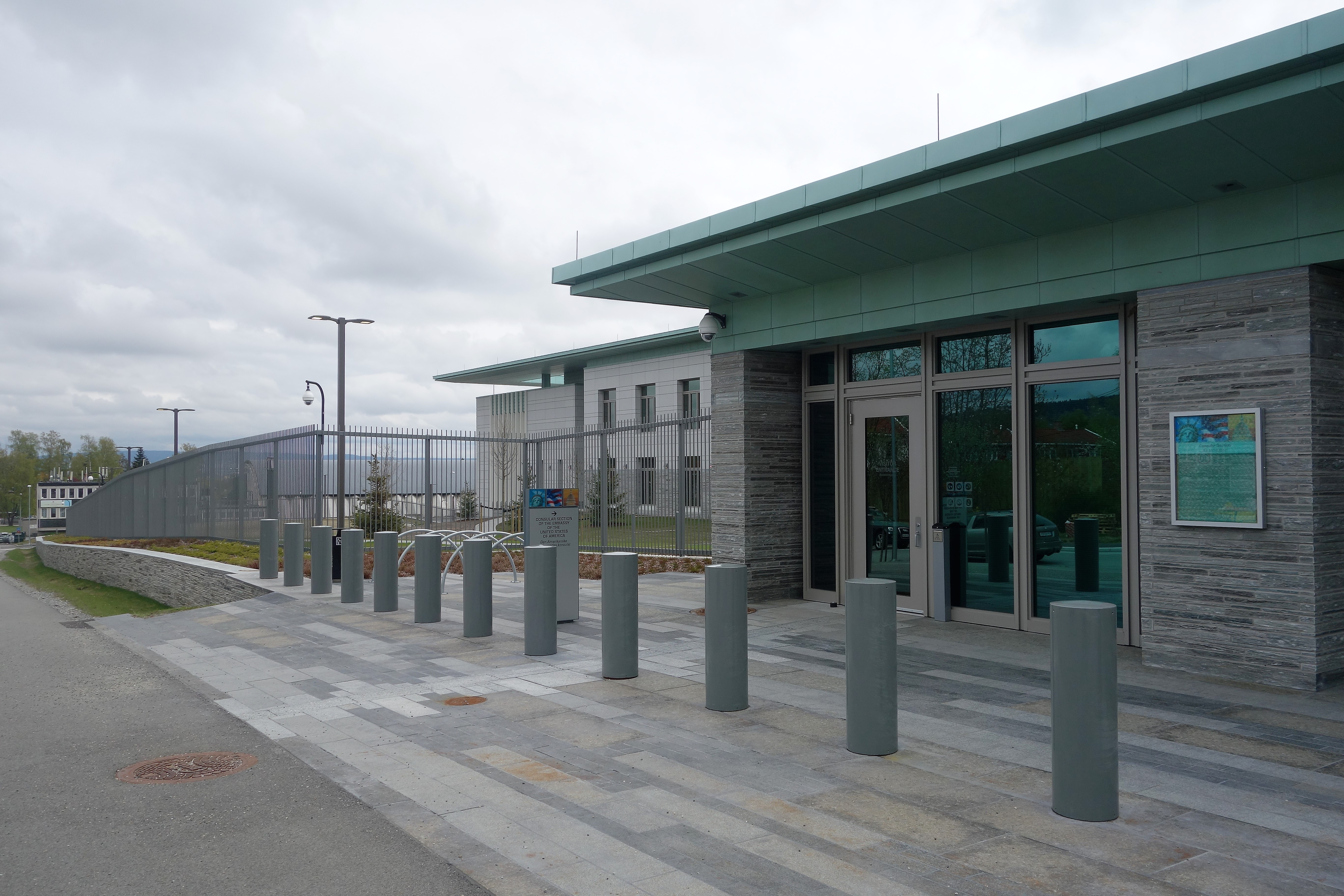
Entrance to the consular section of the present embassy

For years, officials searched for a new embassy location. The suggestion to build in a former forest became controversial, as many feared it would permanently shut the public out of the area. In December 2005, the Oslo City Council decided with the least possible majority that the embassy should be offered a new embassy area in Huseby Forest, not far from Makrellbekken subway station.

On 14 May 2012, the groundbreaking ceremony for an embassy at the new location was conducted in Oslo. The US$228,000,000 project has a particular focus on environmental features and is constructed by Walsh Group of Chicago and the architects/engineers are EYP Architecture & Engineering.

The new embassy meets stricter requirements for security for US embassy buildings. It opened on 15 May 2017. The embassy at Makrellbekken in Oslo has achieved LEED Gold certification (Leadership in Energy and Environmental Design) for its numerous green elements. The embassy's environmental features includes the restoration of a seasonal stream that runs through the site, green roofs, preservation of existing landscape, maximized use of natural light and a ground-source heat exchange.

=== 2026 explosion ===
On the night of 8 March 2026, an explosive device detonated at the consular entrance of the embassy. The explosion caused material damage to the building, but no one was injured. The Norwegian police stated that the blast was likely caused by an improvised explosive device and launched an investigation into the incident. This device was placed at the building's entrance. On 11 March 2026, three men in their twenties were arrested and charged with terror bombing.

== Embassy sections ==
- Consular Section
  - American Citizen Services
  - Visa Services
- United States Commercial Service
- Defense Attaché Office
- Foreign Agricultural Service
- Public Affairs
- Office of Defense Cooperation
- Regional Security Office (Diplomatic Security Service)

== Trade unions ==
Embassies in Norway are not required to answer to trade unions of its employees. The embassy does not negotiate with trade unions of its employees.

== See also ==
- United States Ambassador to Norway
- Norway–United States relations
- Embassy of Norway in Washington, D.C.
