= Smestad station =

Oslo metro station

Smestad
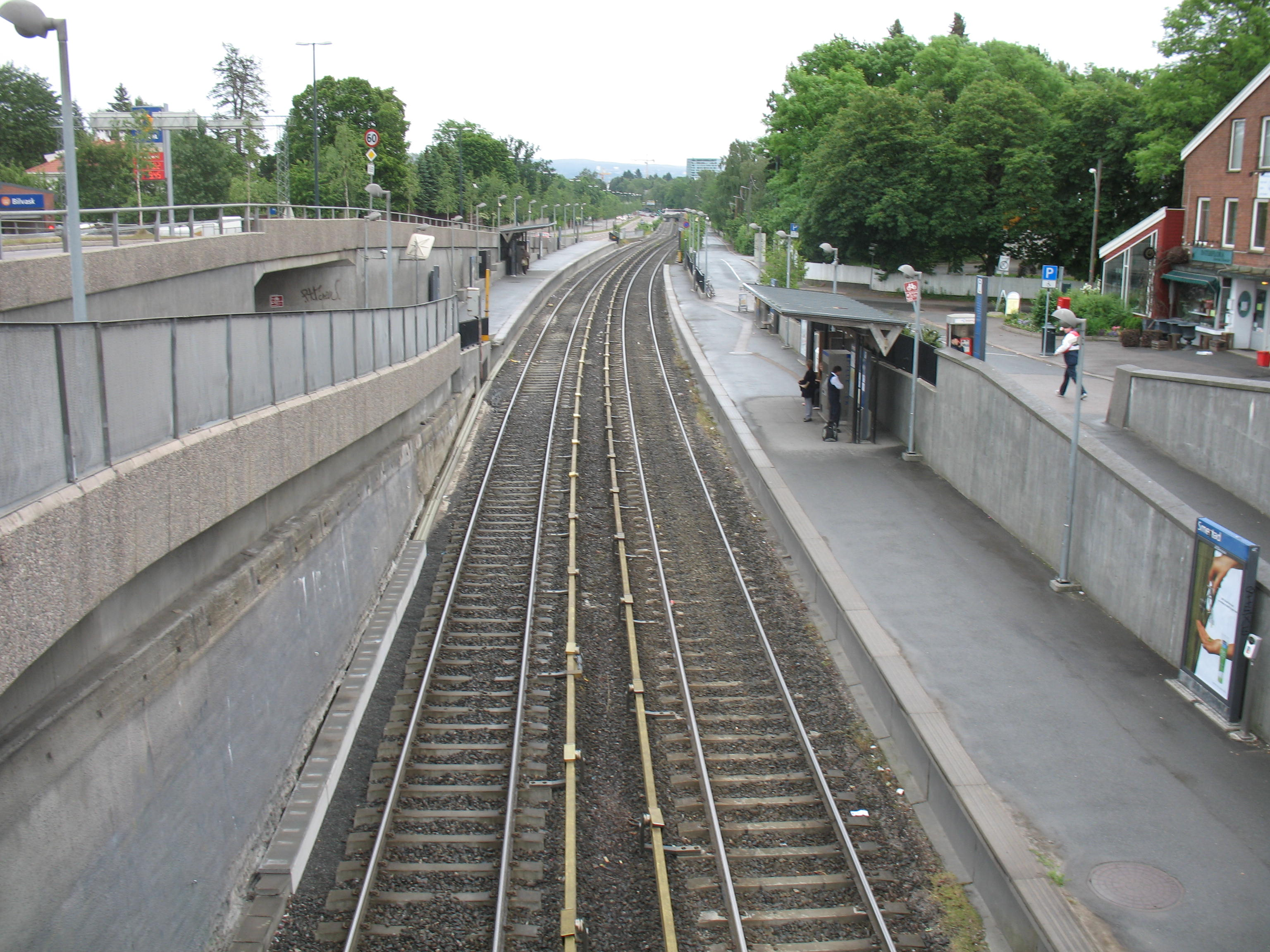
- Overhead view from the nearby bridge, down towards the station.

General information
- Location: Smestad, Oslo; Norway
- Coordinates: 59°56′14″N 10°41′00″E
- Elevation: 63.7 metres (209 ft)
- Owner: Sporveien
- Operator: Sporveien T-banen
- Lines: Røa Line; Kolsås Line
- Distance: 4.6 km (2.9 mi) from Stortinget
- Connections: Bus: 23 Lysaker – Simensbråten; 24 Fornebu — Brynseng; 28 Økern —Fornebu; 40 Skøyen — Øvre Sogn; 45 Voksen skog — Majorstuen; 2N Østerås — Ellingsrudåsen; FB3 Bekkestua — Oslo Airport

Construction
- Structure type: At-grade
- Accessible: Yes

History
- Opened: 17 November 1912; 113 years ago

Services
Preceding station	Oslo Metro	Following station
Makrellbekken towards Østerås	Line 2 Røa Line	Borgen towards Ellingsrudåsen
Montebello towards Kolsås	Line 3 Kolsås Line	Borgen towards Mortensrud
Location

Smestad is a station shared by the Røa Line (line 2) and the Kolsås Line (line 3) on the Oslo T-bane system. Although the two lines continue to share track some time after Smestad, passing the former station of Sørbyhaugen which was also shared, they diverge before passing another station. The next station to the west is Makrellbekken on Røabanen and the temporary station of Husebybakken on Kolsåsbanen. The next station to the east is Borgen. Smestad is located 4.6 km from Stortinget.

The station was originally the terminus of a branch line to Holmenkollbanen which was built from Majorstuen and opened on 17 November 1912. The line was extended to Røa in 1935 while the connection to Kolsåsbanen opened in 1942.

The station is on the southeast side of the intersection Smestadkrysset which includes the outermost ring road (Ring 3) around Oslo and there are some bus-to-subway connections possible at this station.
