= Jacob Olssøn Smestad =

Norwegian farmer

Jacob Olssøn Smestad (1673–1728), was a Norwegian farmer and land owner who was the first member of the Smestad family to own the Smestad farm, which became the origin of the district Smestad in Oslo.

He was the son of farmer Ole Lauritzen Brustad and his wife Dorthe Halvorsdatter Ingier, and took over Brustad Farm after his father died. He ran the farm till 1706 when he sold it to buy at auction generalauditor Lemforts farm, Smestad, the largest farm in Aker, Oslo, at the time. To complete the purchase he borrowed NOK 90,000 from Henrich Lachmann on 16 November 1706. He later changed his last name to Smestad after the farm, and married Ingeborg Andersdatter Grefsen (b. 1680 - d. 20 Oct. 1760) in 1713.

When he died, the farm was valued at NOK 170,000 and he had NOK 41,600 in other assets. The estate was divided equally between his son and daughter, with the farm split into Upper and Lower Smestad. Jacob Smestad is the grandfather of Carl Smestad and great grandfather of Reidar Smestad.
