= Heggeli (station) =

Former Oslo metro station

Coordinates: 59°56′08.2″N 10°41′26.5″E

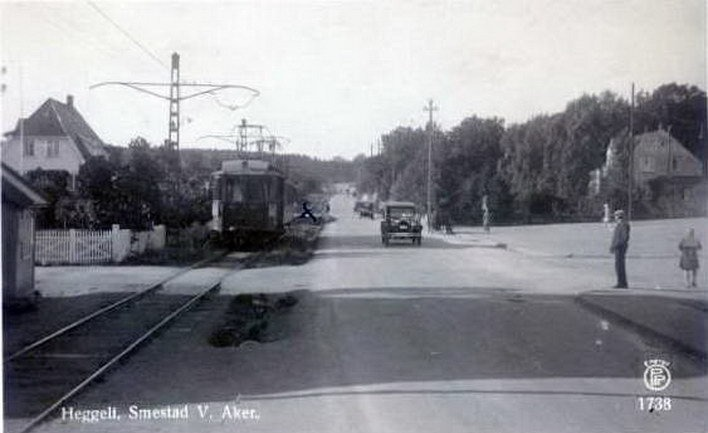
- Picture of Heggeli Station in the early 1900s

General information
- Location: Vestre Aker, Aker (1912-1948); Oslo (1948-); Norway
- Elevation: 55.0 m (180.4 ft)
- Line: Røabanen
- Distance: 4.2 km

Construction
- Structure type: At-grade

History
- Opened: 1912
- Closed: 1995
Location

Heggeli is a former subway station on the Oslo T-bane.

The station was located between Borgen and Smestad, and was opened when the Smestad Line was created, as an extension from Majorstuen to Smestad on 17 November 1912. It was closed as a part of the Røa Line overhaul in 1995.
