= Borgen station =

Metro station in Oslo, Norway

Borgen
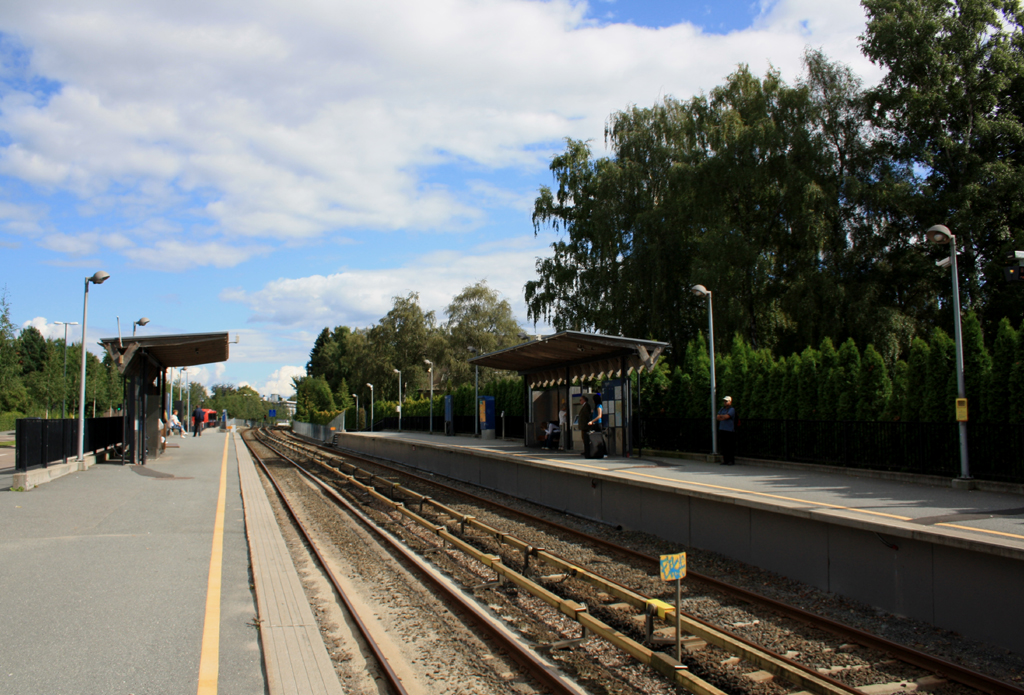

General information
- Location: Borgen, Oslo; Norway
- Coordinates: 59°56′04″N 10°41′45″E
- Elevation: 54.0 m (177.2 ft)
- Owner: Sporveien
- Operator: Sporveien T-banen
- Lines: Røa Line; Kolsås Line
- Distance: 3.8 km (2.4 mi) from Stortinget
- Connections: Bus: 45 Voksen skog - Majorstuen; 28 Fornebu — Økern; 2N Østerås — Ellingsrudåsen

Construction
- Structure type: At-grade
- Accessible: Yes

Other information
- Fare zone: 1

History
- Opened: 17 November 1912; 113 years ago

Services
Preceding station	Oslo Metro	Following station
Smestad towards Østerås	Line 2 Røa Line	Majorstuen towards Ellingsrudåsen
Smestad towards Kolsås	Line 3 Kolsås Line	Majorstuen towards Mortensrud
Location

Borgen is a station shared by the Røa Line and the Kolsås Line on the Oslo T-bane system. The station is between Majorstuen and Smestad, and 3.8 km (2.4 mi) from the central station Stortinget.

The station is located on a stretch where the line runs alongside Sørkedalsveien. The large Vestre gravlund cemetery is situated to the south of the station.

The station was opened on 17 November 1912 as part of a branch line to Holmenkollbanen that went to Smestad and was later extended. There were originally four stations on this line; only Borgen and Smestad remain. The two stations that originally neighbored Borgen, Volvat in the east and Heggeli in the west, are both closed.
