= List of wind-related railway accidents =

High winds can blow railway trains off tracks and cause accidents.

== Dangers of high winds ==
High winds can cause problems in a number of ways:

- blow trains off the tracks
- blow trains or wagons along the tracks and cause collisions
- cause cargo to blow off trains which can damage objects outside the railway or which other trains can collide with
- cause pantographs and overhead wiring to tangle
- cause trees and other objects to fall onto the railway.

== Preventative measures ==
Risks from high winds can be reduced by:

- wind fences akin to snow sheds
- lower profile of carriages
- lowered centre of gravity of vehicles
- reduction in train speed or cancellation, at high winds
- a wider rail gauge
- improve overhead wiring with:
  - regulated tension rather than fixed terminations
  - shorter catenary spans
  - solid conductors

== By country ==
=== Australia ===
- 1928 – 47 wagons blown along line at Tocumwal
- 1931 – Kandos – wind blows level crossing gates closed in front of motor-cyclist
- 1943 – Hobart, Tasmania; Concern that wind will blow over doubledeck trams on 1,067 mm (3 ft 6 in) gauge if top deck enclosed.
- 2010 – Marla, South Australia; Small tornado blows over train.

=== Austria ===
- 1910 – Trieste (now in Italy) – train blown down embankment.

=== China ===
- Lanxin High-Speed Railway#Wind shed risk
- February 28, 2007 – Wind blows 10 passenger rail cars off the track near Turpan, China.

=== Denmark ===
- Great Belt Bridge rail accident. On 2 January 2019 a DSB express passenger train is hit by a semi-trailer from a passing cargo train on the western bridge of the Great Belt Fixed Link during Storm Alfrida, killing eight people and injuring 16.

=== Germany ===
- Rügen narrow-gauge railway, 20 October 1936: derailment of a train, five injured

=== India ===
- One reason for choosing broad gauge in India for greater stability in high winds.

=== Ireland ===
- On the night of 30 January 1925, strong winds derailed carriages of a train crossing the Owencarrow Viaduct of the 914 mm (3 ft) gauge Londonderry and Lough Swilly Railway.

=== Japan ===
- Inaho
- Amarube Viaduct
- 1895 Gale blows train into sea

=== New Zealand ===
- Rimutaka Incline railway accident

=== Norway ===
- Makrellbekken (station)#Wind related accident – blowing snow disoriented a tractor driver who collided with a train

=== South Africa ===
- Wind tangles overhead wiring in Cape Town, 2012.

=== Switzerland ===
- In 1996, one train from the Wengernalp Railway derailed in Bernese Oberland with four people injured.
- On 19 January 2007, one train derailed near Wasserausen.
- In 2018, one train from the Montreux–Lenk im Simmental line derailed in the Simmental region, injuring eight people.
- On 31 March 2023, two trains derailed in the Canton of Bern due to strong winds, with fifteen people injured.

=== United Kingdom ===
- Tay Bridge disaster 1879
- Chelford rail accident 1894 – during shunting
- De-wirements on the East Coast Main Line
- Leven Viaduct, Cumbria 27 February 1903
- Carrbridge 1914 – train derailed due to torrent caused by storm
- Cheddington 2008 – two containers blown off train – design of "spigots" criticised.
- Moston 2015 – out of gauge train hits platform, throwing stones onto other track.
- Scout Green 2015 – empty 30-foot ISA container blown off train

=== United States ===
- On 24 April 1883, 2 cars of a passenger train were blown from the narrow-gauge Denver, South Park and Pacific Railroad tracks near Como, Colorado, with only minor injuries.
- Around 6:15 pm, 6 May 1876, a passenger train traveling south on the Illinois Central Railroad at about 23 miles per hour was derailed during a storm just south of Neoga, Illinois. Numerous minor injuries were reported.
- Around 7 am, 23 Feb. 1884, 2 cars were blown off the narrow-gauge tracks of the Colorado Central Railroad near Georgetown, Colorado.
- Around 2 pm, 4 February 1885, the wind overturned an entire 3-car Colorado Central Railroad train just east of Georgetown, Colorado. The express train had slowed to 8 miles per hour because of the wind. 18 out of 20 passengers were injured.
- At 3:30 pm, 1 April 1892, a narrow-gauge passenger train of the Burlington and Northwestern Railway was blown off the tracks while running at full speed 1 mile east of Butler, a station between Fremont, Iowa and Hedrick, Iowa.; 4 were seriously injured, a dozen more suffered minor injuries. Note that the location places this on the Burlington and Western Railway tracks.
- On 2 September 1911, tram services in Charleston, South Carolina, were suspended due to winds.
- On 28 June 1986, a derecho derailed 18 piggyback cars on the Kate Shelley High Bridge over the Des Moines River in Iowa.
- On 29 June 1998, the Corn Belt Derecho blew several double stack and piggyback cars off the Iowa Interstate Railroad bridge across the Iowa River.
- A 2008 tornado in Northern Illinois derailed a Union Pacific train. Dramatic footage of the event was captured by a camera mounted on the train.
- On 27 April 2015, a severe storm knocked several double stack cars off the track as a train crossed the Huey P. Long Bridge, New Orleans, Louisiana, with no injuries. The accident was captured by a WGNO News Team dashcam.
- On 13 March 2019, mid-day winds of around 80 mph derailed the rear 26 cars of a double stack train on the Union Pacific high steel trestle over the Canadian River south of Logan, New Mexico.

One reason for choosing broad gauge (17% wider than standard gauge) for BART was the greater stability in high winds and perhaps earthquakes.

== Factors ==
- Lightweight trains
- Narrow gauge
- Aspects of the terrain
- Tunnels

== See also ==
- Snowshed
