= Reidar Smestad =

Reidar Smestad (8 May 1888 – 29 June 1962) was a Norwegian industrialist and landowner, the son of Carl Smestad and grandson of Jacob Olssøn Smestad.

After studying mining engineering at Bergakademie Berlin, he built up a mining company with assets such as the soapstone mining facilities in Kvam, which were later acquired by Norsk Hydro and AS Granitt, as well as the soapstone facilities in Lalm.

Smestad died on 29 June 1962 and is buried at the cemetery at Ullern Church.
