= Carl Smestad =

Carl Smestad (born c. 1849 – 4 April 1924) was a landowner and trader in ice and produce. He owned Smestad Mansion and its surrounding lands, comprising large parts of what is today the Smestad district in Oslo. He was the grandson of Jacob Olssøn Smestad and father of Reidar Smestad born 1888.
