= Chelford rail accident =

1894 railway accident in Cheshire, England

Coordinates: 53.27198°N 2.27834°W

- The railway disaster at Chelford, near Crewe (The Illustrated London News, 1895)

Details
- Date: 22 December 1894; 16:44
- Location: Chelford, Cheshire
- Country: England
- Line: London and North Western Railway
- Cause: A high-sided wagon was moved by the wind in the path of others.

Statistics
- Trains: 2
- Deaths: 14
- Injured: 48

The Chelford rail accident occurred on 22 December 1894 at Chelford railway station. The stationmaster was supervising shunting operations, during which a high-sided wagon was fly-shunted (i.e. run-off) into a siding in strong winds and rapidly fading light. As another six wagons were being run onto an adjoining track, the stationmaster saw the high-sided wagon being blown out of its siding by the wind to meet them. A collision occurred derailing the runaway in such a way that it fouled the main line just as the 16:15 Manchester to Crewe express approached, drawn by two locomotives, LNWR Waterloo Class 2-4-0 No 418 Zygia and Experiment Class No 518 Express. The stationmaster ran towards them waving a red lamp but the drivers thought he was signalling to the shunters and did not reduce speed. Zygia derailed and fell on her side whilst her tender ran up the platform ramp. Express remained upright but the first carriage demolished the front of a signal box. In all, 14 passengers were killed and 48 injured.

The inquiry had little comment to make as this seemed to be a freak accident but advised that in the future the brakes of all shunted wagons should be immediately pinned down.

A contemporary photo supposedly shows the re-railed damaged locomotive Zygia shortly after the accident.

== See also ==
- List of wind-related railway accidents

== Sources ==
- Rolt, L.T.C.; Kichenside, Geoffrey (1982) [1955]. Red for Danger (4th ed.). Newton Abbot: David & Charles. pp. 184–186. ISBN 0-7153-8362-0.
- Marindin, Major F.A. (18 January 1895). BOT Accident Report Chelford 1894 (PDF). London: Board of Trade.
