= Hauger station =

Oslo metro station

Hauger
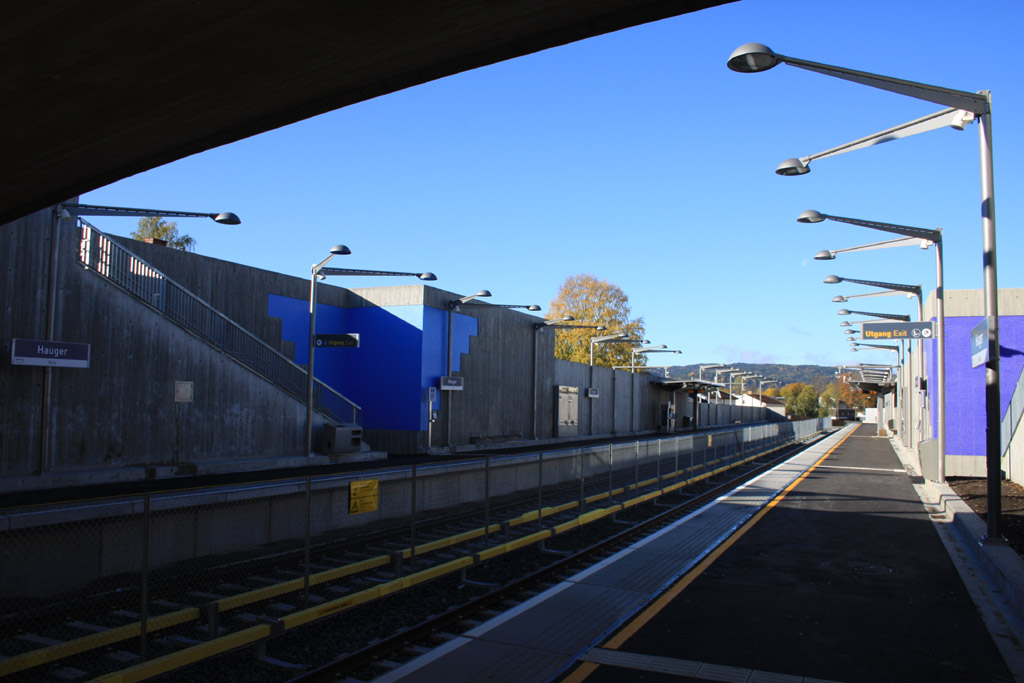

General information
- Location: Akershus, Norway, Bærum; Norway
- Coordinates: 59°54′39″N 10°30′41″E
- Owner: Sporveien
- Operator: Sporveien T-banen
- Line: Kolsås Line
- Distance: 16.5 km (10.3 mi) from Stortinget

Construction
- Structure type: At-grade
- Accessible: Yes

History
- Opened: 1 January 1930; 96 years ago

Services
Preceding station	Oslo Metro	Following station
Kolsås Terminus	Line 3	Gjettum towards Mortensrud
Location

Hauger is a station on the Kolsås Line (line 3) on the Oslo Metro system. It is located between Kolsås and Gjettum, 16.5 kilometers (10.3 mi) from Stortinget. It serves the neighborhood Hauger and the mainly industrial area Rud. Two upper secondary schools Rud and Rosenvilde are located in its vicinity.

The station was opened on 1 January 1930 as part of the tramway Lilleaker Line.
