= Røa (station) =

Oslo metro station

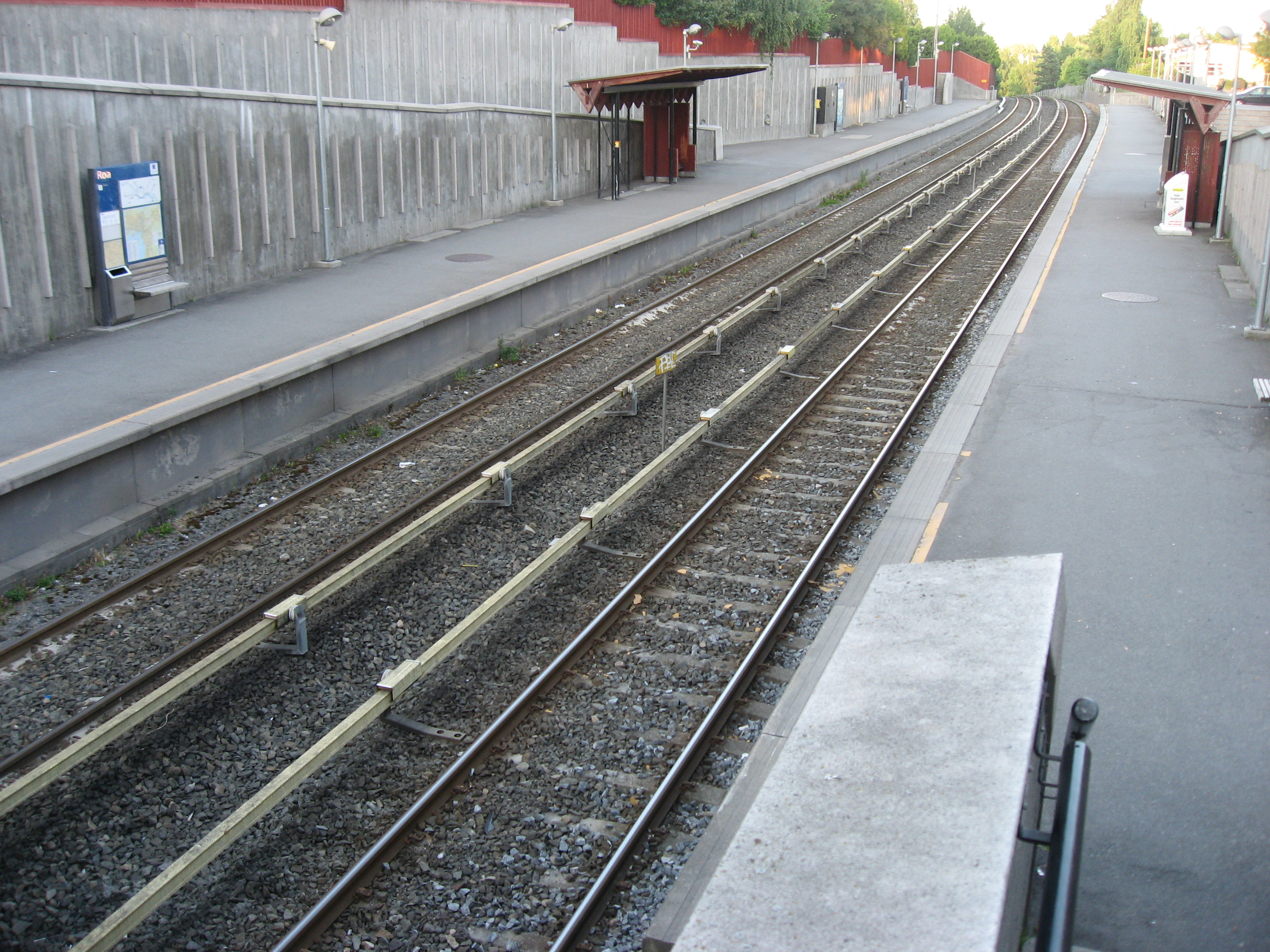

General information
- Location: Vestre Aker, Oslo; Norway
- Coordinates: 59°56′48″N 10°38′38″E
- Elevation: 142.4 m (467 ft)
- Owner: Sporveien
- Operator: Sporveien T-banen
- Line: Røa Line
- Distance: 7.5 km (4.7 mi) from Stortinget
- Platforms: 2
- Tracks: 2
- Connections: Bus: 42 Tjuvholmen - Voksen Skog; 41 Sørkedalen; 2N Østerås - Ellingsrudåsen; FB3 Oslo Airport - Bekkestua

Construction
- Structure type: At-grade
- Accessible: Yes

Other information
- Fare zone: 1

History
- Opened: 24 January 1935
Location

Røa is a station on Røa Line (Line 2) of the Oslo Metro, located in the Vestre Aker borough, 7.5 kilometers (4.7 mi) from Stortinget. The station is located between the stations of Hovseter and Ekraveien. The station is part of the old western suburban rail network and was opened on 24 January 1935, slightly to the west of the current location. Up until 1951 it was the terminus station, but the line was extended to Grini in 1948 and to Østerås in 1972.

The station is one of the transportation nodes in the west, and four bus lines connect with the station. The daily ridership is in the order of 4000.

Preceding station	Oslo Metro	Following station
Ekraveien towards Østerås	Line 2	Hovseter towards Ellingsrudåsen
