= Ellingsrudåsen station =

Oslo metro station

Ellingsrudåsen
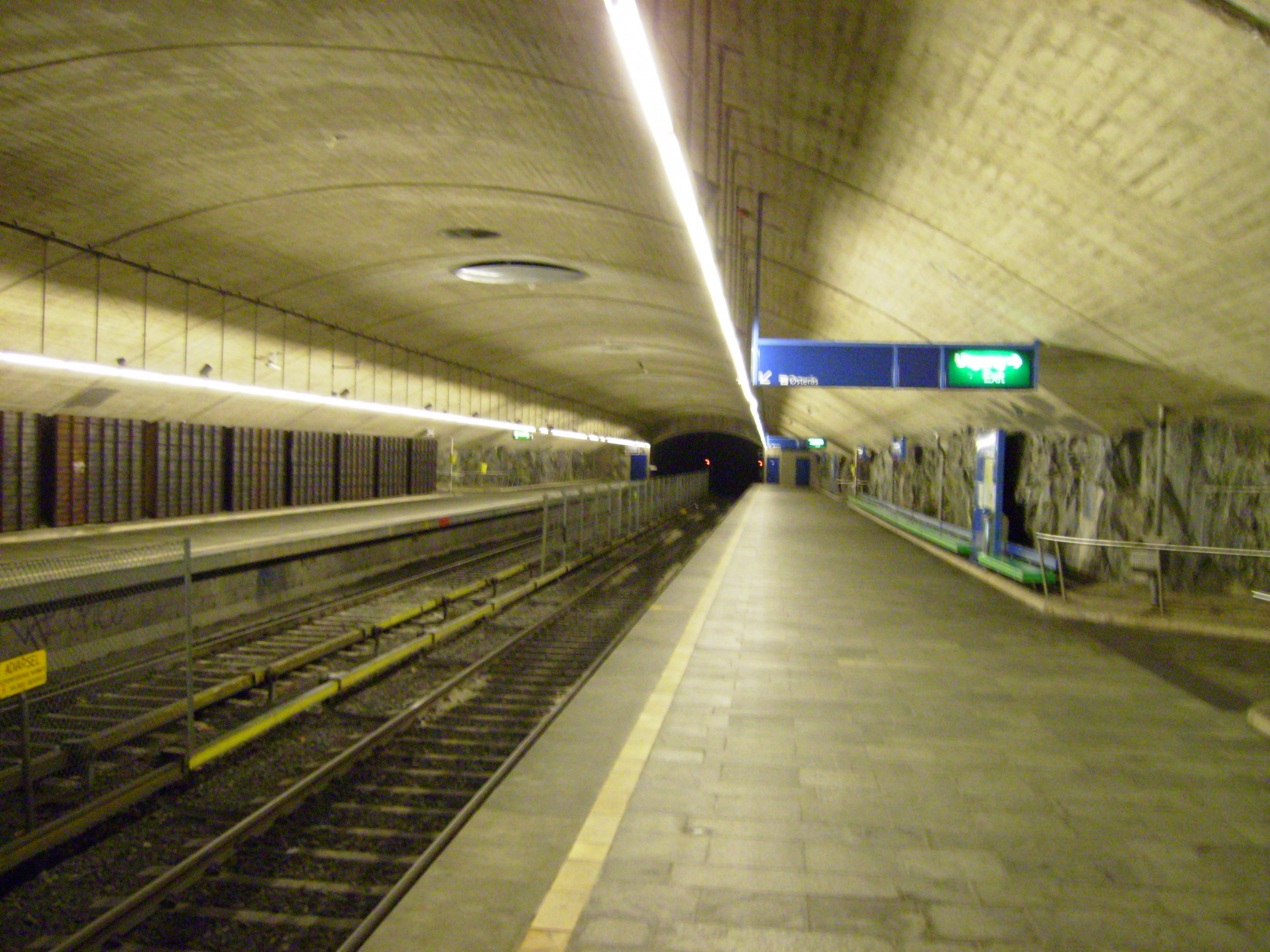

General information
- Location: Ellingsrud, Oslo; Norway
- Coordinates: 59°56′9″N 10°54′59″E
- Elevation: 165.2 m (542 ft)
- Owner: Sporveien
- Operator: Sporveien T-banen
- Line: Furuset Line
- Distance: 12.0 km (7.5 mi) from Stortinget
- Connections: Bus: 26 Bislett via Carl Berners plass 2N Østerås T - Helsfyr T - Lørenskog Sentrum (Nattbuss)

Construction
- Structure type: Underground
- Accessible: Yes

History
- Opened: 8 November 1981
Location

Ellingsrudåsen is a subway station on the Oslo Metro, located at Ellingsrud in the Alna borough. Since its opening on 8 November 1981, it has been the eastern terminus for the Furuset Line (Line 2). The line extension cost 50 million kroner at the time.

Ellingsrudåsen is a mostly residential area. Above the station is a small shopping centre.

Ellingsrudåsen is located over 40 meters underground, and elevators are the usual means of getting to and from the station. Like Romsås, Ellingsrudåsen has natural mountain walls.

Preceding station	Oslo Metro	Following station
Furuset towards Østerås	Line 2	Terminus
