= Østerås station =

Oslo metro station

Østerås
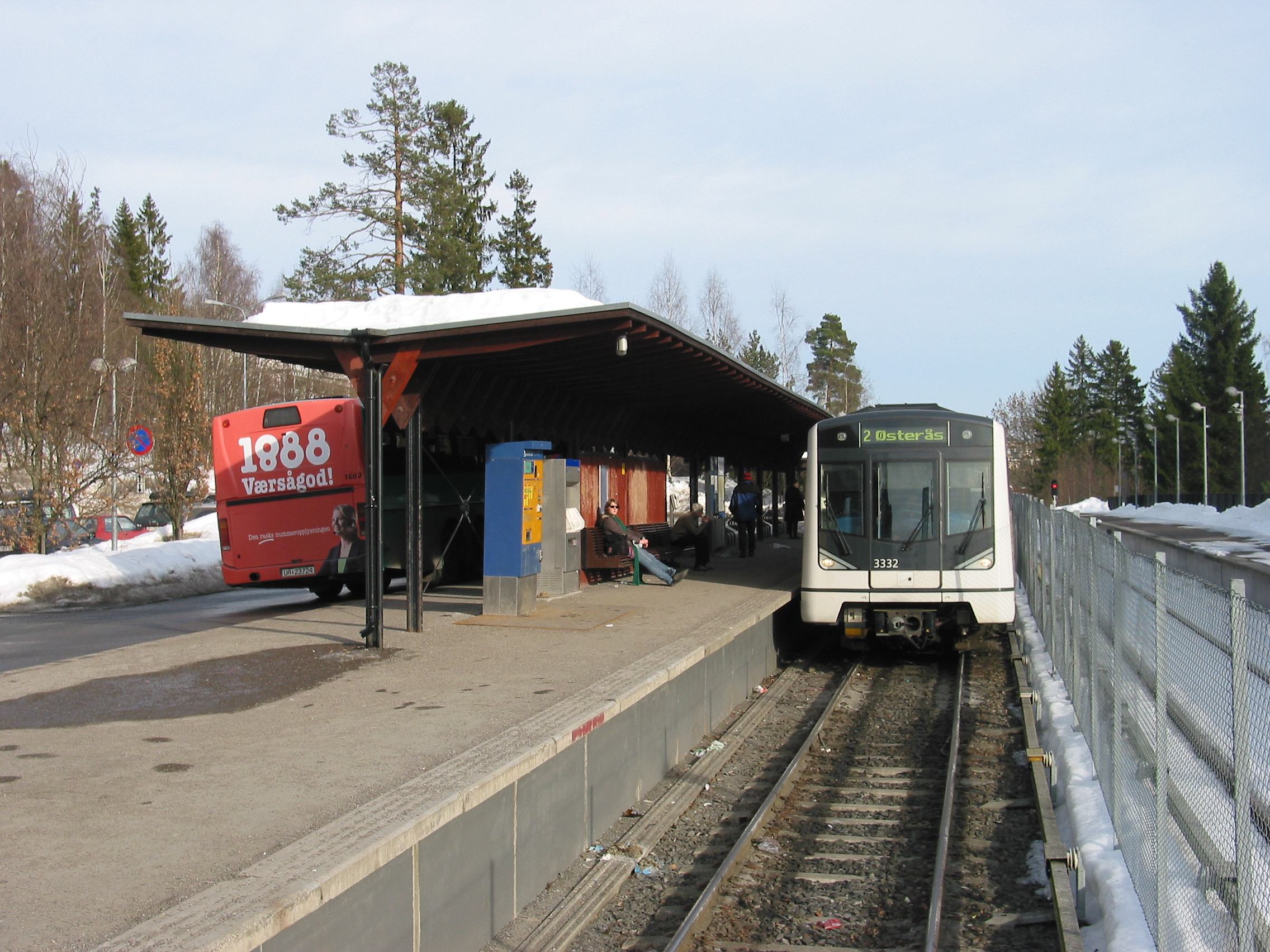
- MX3000 unloading at Østerås.

General information
- Location: Østerås, Bærum; Norway
- Coordinates: 59°56′21″N 10°36′32″E
- Elevation: 130.0 m (426.5 ft)
- Owner: Sporveien
- Operator: Sporveien T-banen
- Line: Røa Line
- Distance: 10.2 km (6.3 mi) from Stortinget
- Connections: 140 Bekkestua — Skøyen; 230 Sandvika - Ila; 235 Listuveien; 2N Ellingsrudåsen T 140N Bekkestua — Oslo Bus Terminal

Construction
- Structure type: At-grade
- Accessible: Yes

History
- Opened: 16 November 1972
Location

Østerås is the terminal station on the Røa Line of the Oslo Metro. The station is located in Bærum municipality, 10.2 km from Stortinget and was opened on 16 November 1972, extending the line from Lijordet.

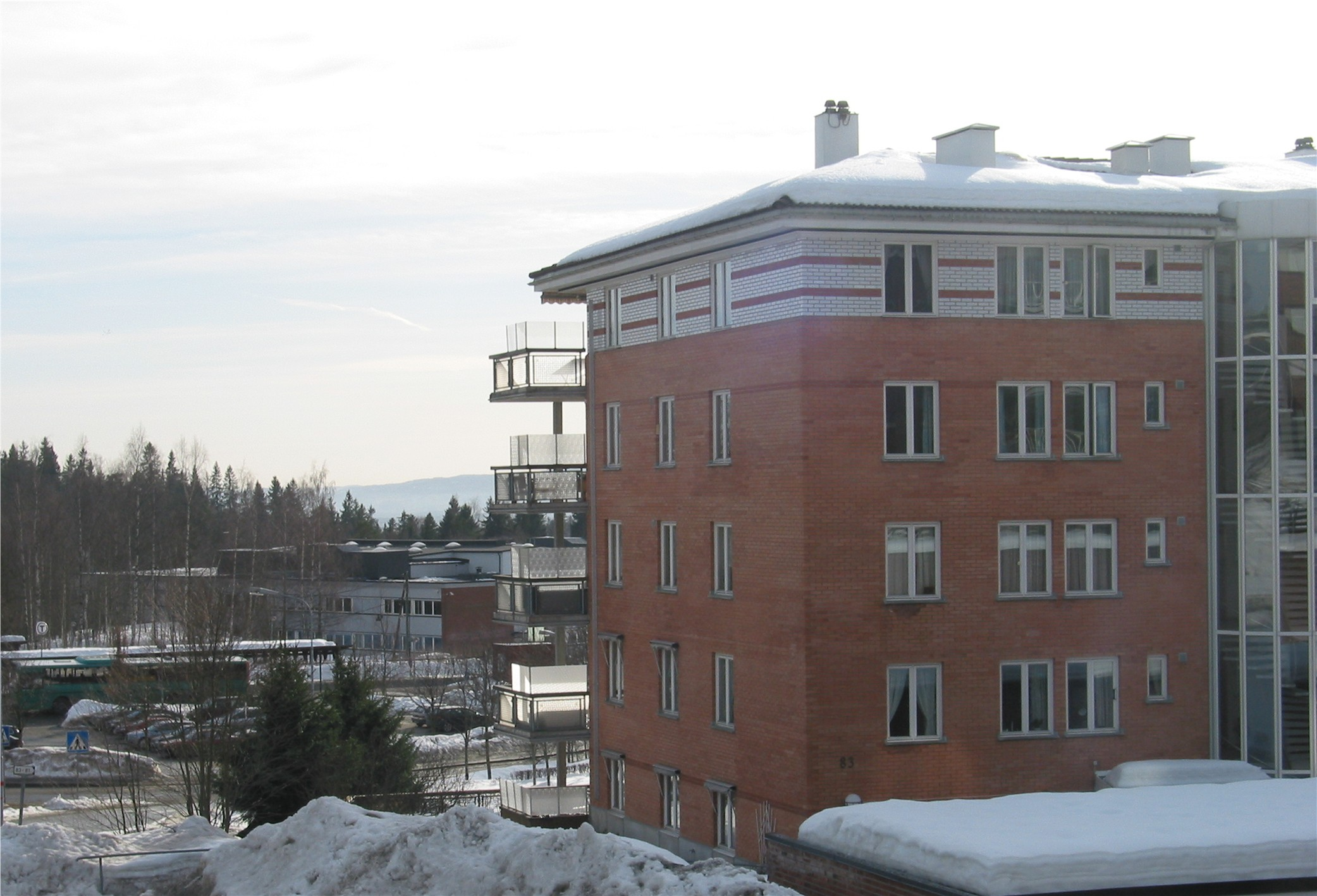
Housing at Østerås; the station visible in the background.

Østerås is a largely residential area. Next to the station is the middle school Østerås. The station also serves Eikeli Upper Secondary School.

Preceding station	Oslo Metro	Following station
Terminus	Line 2	Lijordet towards Ellingsrudåsen
