= Ullern =

Borough of Oslo, Norway

Coordinates: 59°55′32″N 10°39′17″E

Bydel Ullern
- Borough
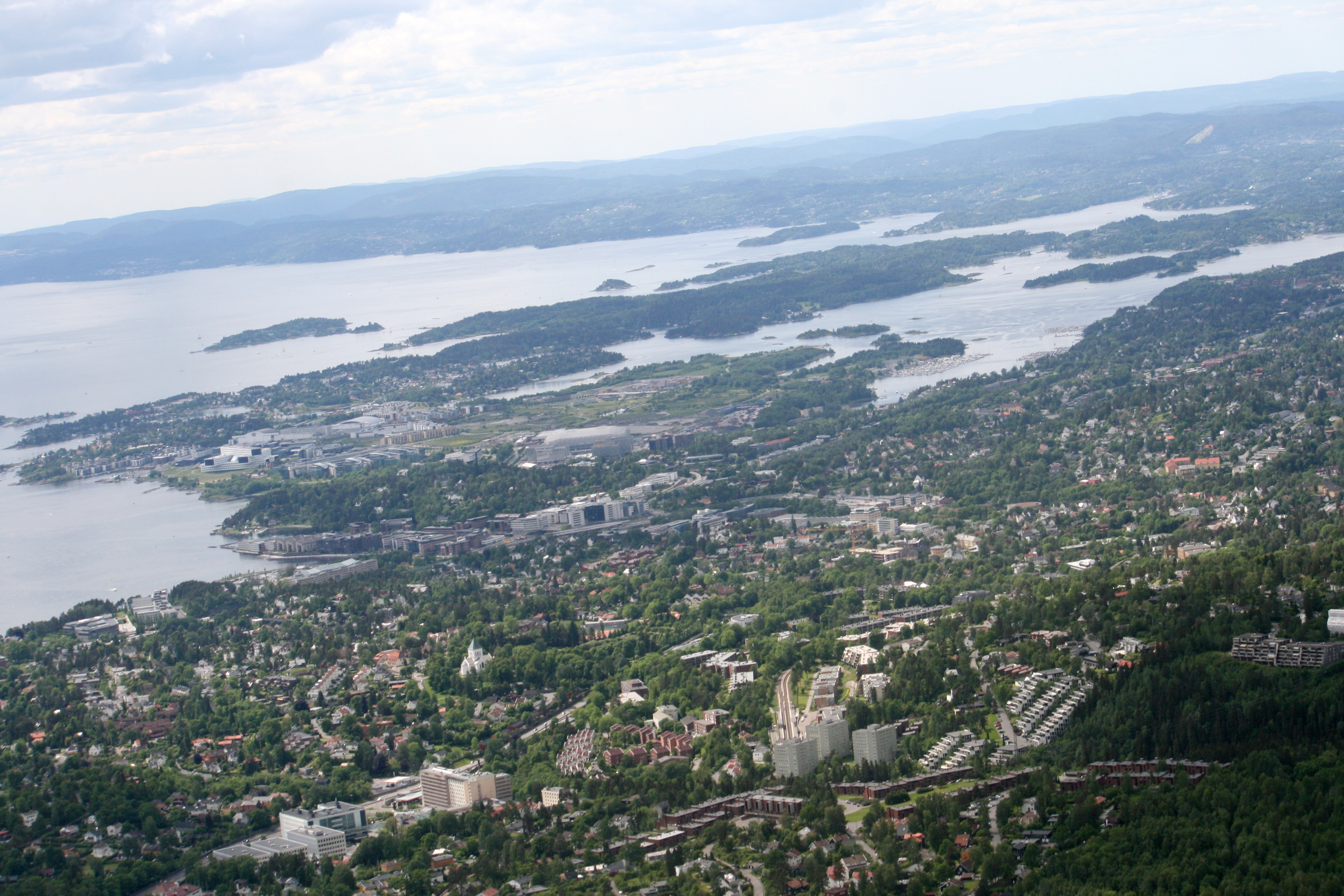

- Coat of arms

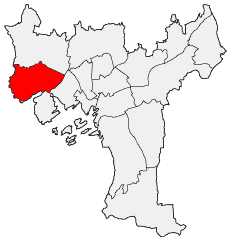
- Country: Norway
- City: Oslo

Area
  - Total: 9.4 km^{2} (3.6 sq mi)

Population (2020)
  - Total: 34,596
  - Density: 3,680/km^{2} (9,500/sq mi)
- Time zone: UTC+1 (CET)
  - Summer (DST): UTC+2 (CEST)
- ISO 3166 code: NO-030106
- Website: bydel-ullern.oslo.kommune.no

Ullern is a borough of the city of Oslo, Norway.

== History ==
The borough has its name from an old farm, Norse Ullarin. The first element is the genitive case of the name of the Norse god Ullr. The last element is vin, meaning pasture or meadow. In medieval times, the farm belonged to the monastery at Hovedøya. Following the Reformation in 1536, the farmland was separated between the crown and the local canon. Formally divided into lower and upper Ullern in 1740, both farms were bought by Herman Severin Løvenskiold, in 1878 and 1866 respectively.

At the time, Ullern was a part of the rural municipality Aker. Signs of urbanization began in the 1800s, when Skøyen and areas along the Lysaker River, which divides Ullern from Bærum, began developing into industrial sites. The 1872 opening of the Drammen Line railway was a catalyst for further building activity, as were the 1912 opening of the Smestad Line and the 1919 extension of the Skøyen Line to Lilleaker. The two latter lines were later extended further, in 1935 and 1924 respectively. In 1942, a connection between the two lines, between Jar and Sørbyhaugen, was opened, providing public rail transportation to the northern part of Ullern. In 1948, Ullern became a part of Oslo, when Oslo absorbed the entire Aker municipality. In the post-World War II period, the villa-dominated housing was supplemented by tower blocks, scattered across the borough.

== Geography ==
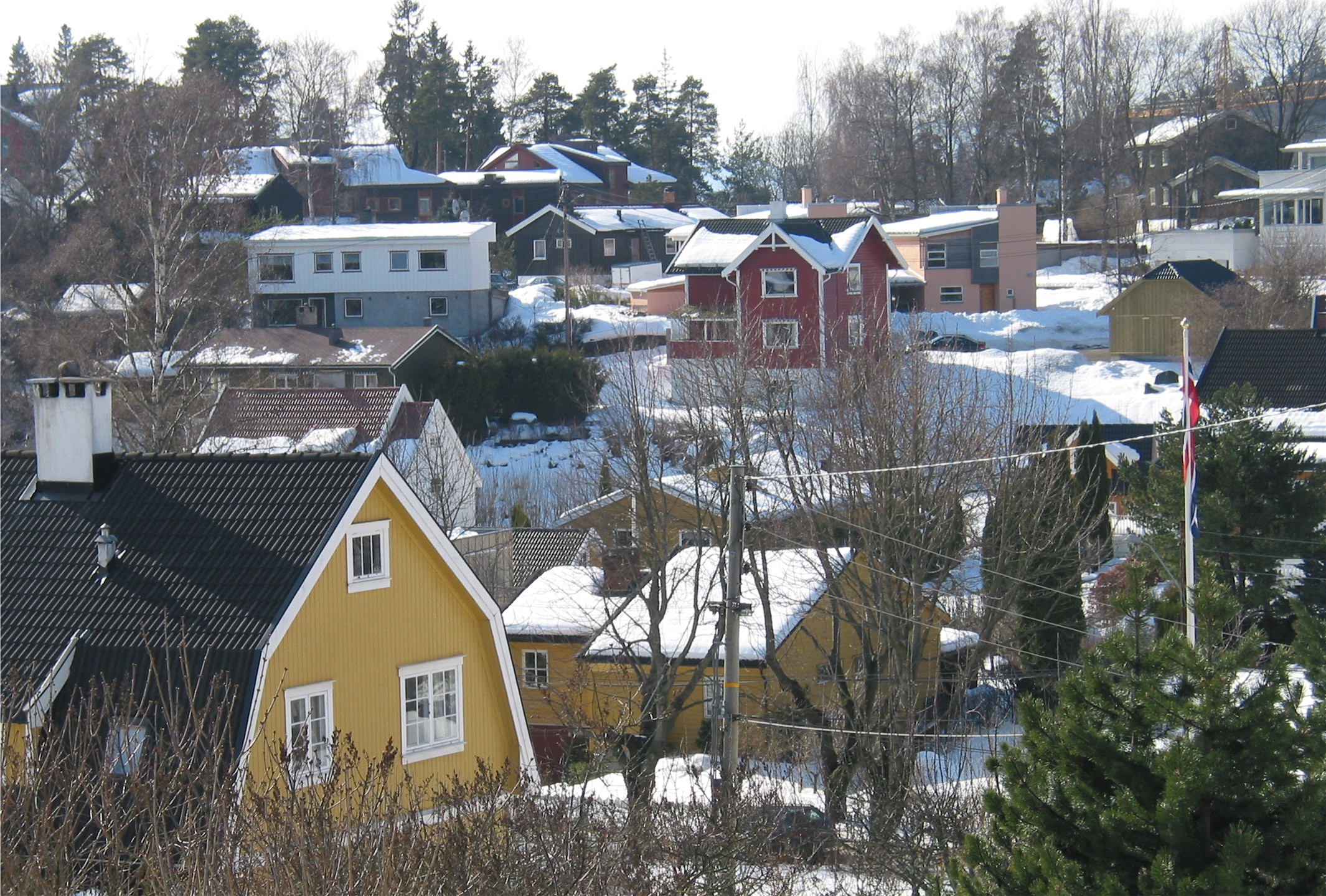
View of the residential area at Sollerud

Neighborhoods in the borough of Ullern include Lysejordet, Øraker, Lilleaker, Sollerud, Vækerø, Bestum, Ullern, Bjørnsletta, Ullernåsen, Montebello, Hoff and Skøyen.

The borough borders the Lysaker River and Bærum municipality in the west, Lysakerfjorden and Bygdøy in the south, Frogner borough in the east and Vestre Aker borough in the north. Before the borough mergers of 2003, the neighboring boroughs were Røa and Vinderen in the north and Uranienborg-Majorstuen and Bygdøy-Frogner in the east.

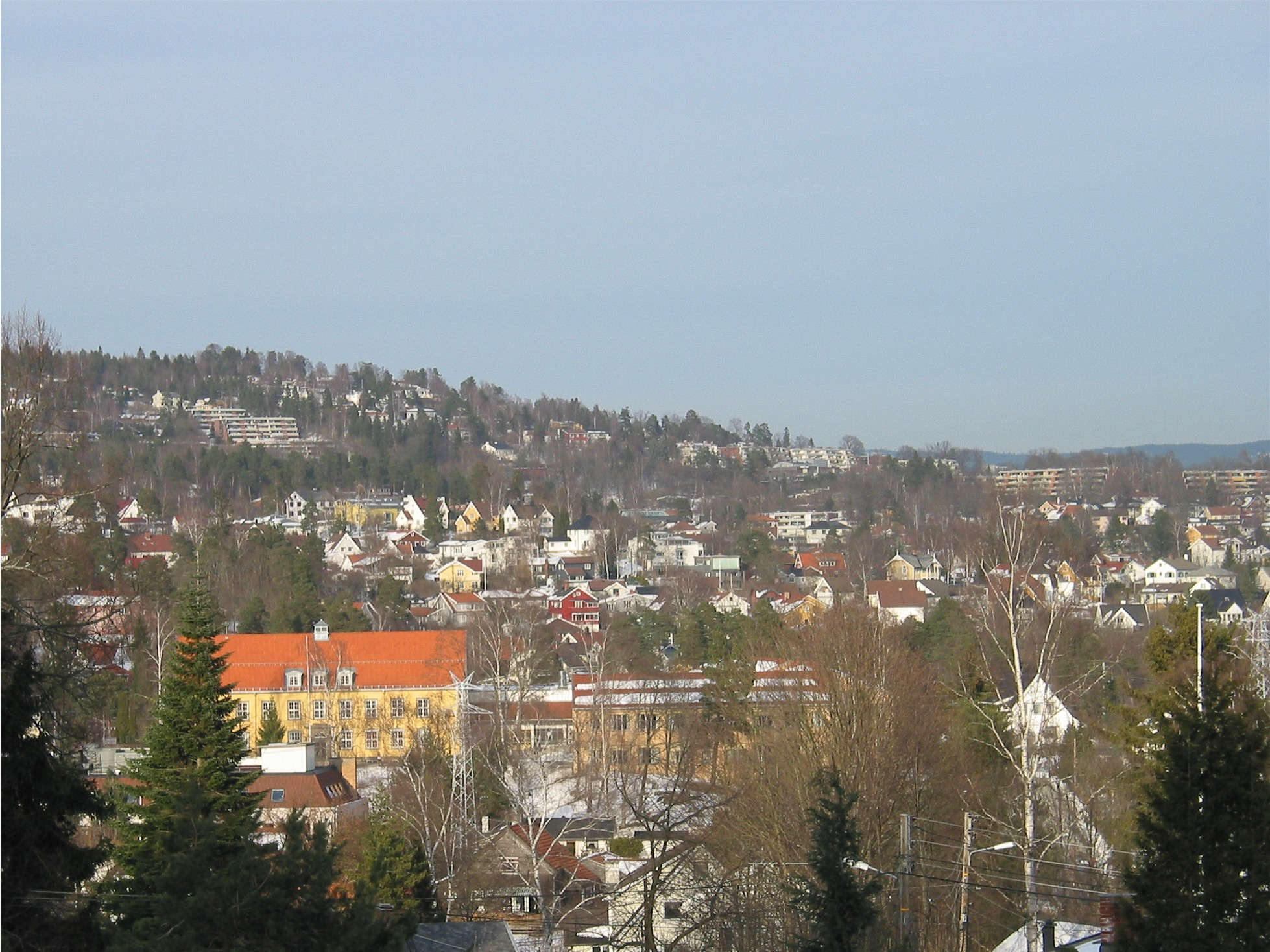
View of Øraker, with Jar in Bærum in the foreground

The hill Ullernåsen reaches 201 metres above sea level. It is known for its volcanic origin.

== Transportation ==
Ullern is served by the Lilleaker Line and Skøyen Line of the Oslo Tramway, the Kolsås Line of the Oslo T-bane and the Drammen Line railroad. The stations within the borough are Øraker, Lilleaker, Sollerud, Furulund, Bestum, Ullern, Abbediengen, Hoff and Skøyen (Oslo Tramway); Bjørnsletta, Åsjordet, Ullernåsen and Montebello (Oslo T-bane); and Skøyen (Drammen Line). Defunct stations are Bestum (Oslo Tramway); Lysakerelven, Old Bjørnsletta, Sørbyhaugen, Husebybakken (Oslo T-bane) and Bestun (Drammen Line).

The European route E18 runs through the southern part of the borough. At Vækerø, the Norwegian national road 160 branches off and heads north-east, passing Furulund station, the Old Bjørnsletta station and Lysakerelven station before crossing the Oslo-Bærum border at Jar. The Ring 3 starts at Lysaker, crosses the Oslo-Bærum border in the southern Granfoss Tunnel, emerges at Mustad before entering the northern Granfoss Tunnel, finally emerging near Ullern Church. It passes the Radium Hospital before continuing into Vestre Aker at Smestad.

The residents also have access to boat traffic from nearby Lysaker, and until 1998 access to the now-defunct Oslo Airport, Fornebu.

== Business ==
Major commercial areas are found at Lilleaker, Vækerø and Skøyen. The shopping mall CC Vest is located at Lilleaker, partially utilizing the former locales of the manufacturing company O. Mustad & Son. A locomotive production company, Thunes Mekaniske Værksted, had its localities at Thune, but is now defunct. Until the 2000s, Norges Varemesse ran a large convention center at Skøyen. The Norwegian Radium Hospital, opened in 1931, is located at Montebello. Slightly east of the Radium Hospital is Smestad fire station, opened in 1947. There are several schools in the borough, but no institutions of higher education.

== Culture ==
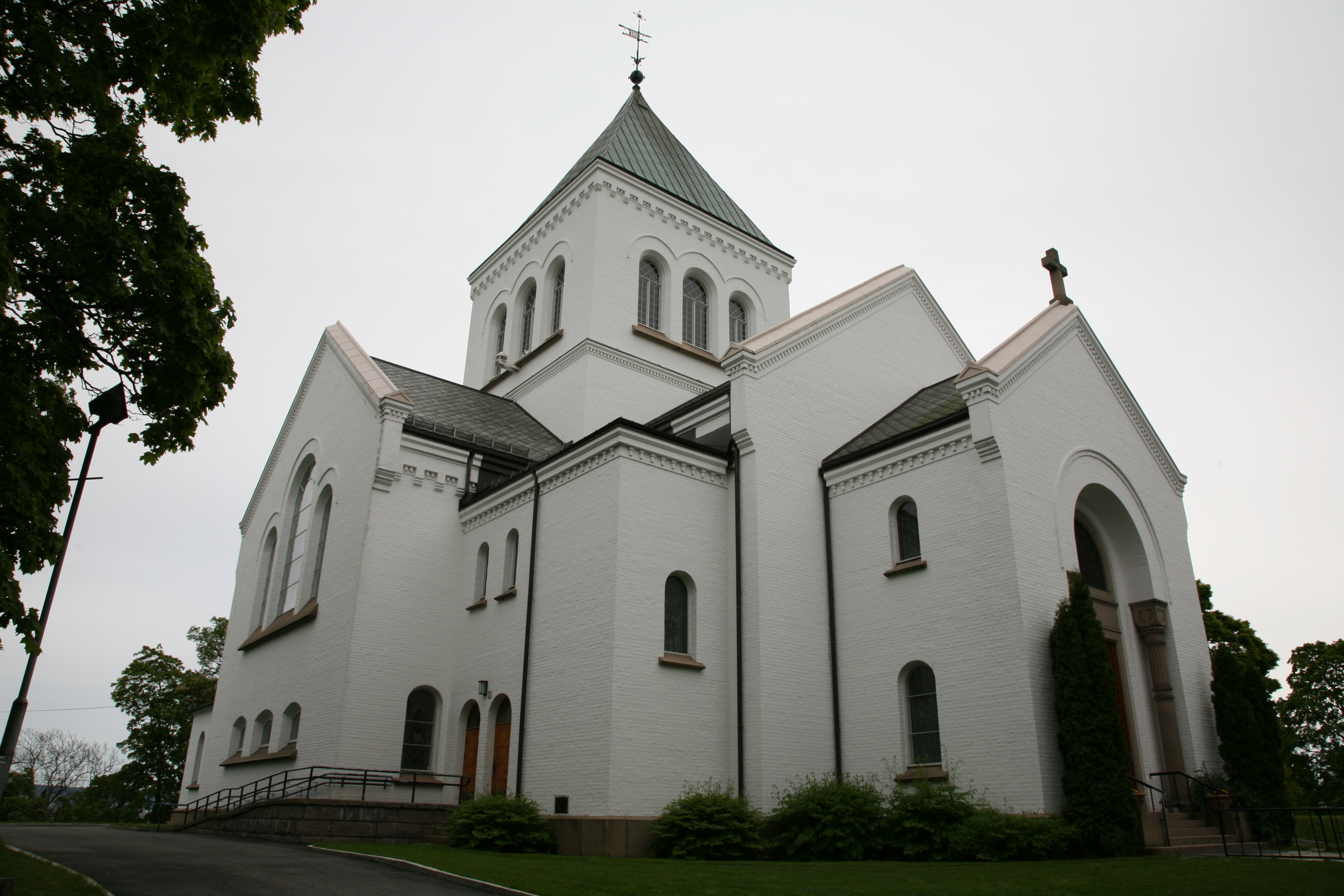
Ullern church

Ullern is a parish in the Church of Norway, but the borders do not correspond with the borough borders. The parish was separated from Vestre Aker in 1906, and later on Røa and Skøyen were separated from Ullern, in 1957 and 1984 respectively. Ullern church, serving the parish of Ullern, was raised in 1903. The parish of Skøyen had its church raised in 1989. The parishes of Ullern and Skøyen are parts of Vestre Aker deanery, in turn a part of the Diocese of Oslo.

The local newspaper is Ullern Avis Akersposten. Aftenposten is widespread as well.

=== Sports ===
The local multi-sports team is Ullern IF. It was founded in 1909, and absorbed the neighboring teams Bestum IF and Liull in 1972. Their home field, used for football and bandy matches, is located near Lysakerelven station. The indoor arena Ørakerhallen is used for handball and basketball matches; its basketball team last won the national title in 1996. The tennis club Ullern TK split from Ullern IF in 1992, and has its courts at Blokkajordet. Since 2000 it also owns 25% of the national tennis arena at Hasle. Notable players include Thorvald Moe and Jan Frode Andersen.

Ullern had several ski jumping hills in the past. Ullernbakken in Ullernåsen was demolished in 1958. Another hill, Husebybakken, was the venue of the competition Husebyrennet between 1879 and 1891. The competition was moved to the hill Holmenkollen in 1892, starting the Holmenkollen ski festival.

In addition, boat sports are popular. The rowing club Bestumkilen RK and the canoeing club Oslo KK are based in Bestumkilen, an arm of Lysakerfjorden. Leisure boating is also widespread.

== Politics ==
As a borough of Oslo, Ullern is governed by the city council of Oslo as well as its own borough council. The council leader is Carl Oscar Pederson from the Conservative Party, and the deputy leader is Ingrid Hopp, also of the Conservative Party. The Conservative Party has the most seats. The 15 seats are distributed among the following political parties for the 2019-2023 term:

- 8 from the Conservative Party (Høyre)
- 2 from the Labour Party (Arbeiderpartiet)
- 2 from the Green Party (Miljøpartiet de Grønne)
- 1 from the Progress Party (Fremskrittspartiet)
- 1 from the Socialist Left Party (Sosialistisk Venstreparti)
- 1 from the Liberal Party (Venstre)

The administration is headquartered at Hoff.
