= Lilleaker Line =

Tram line in Oslo, Norway

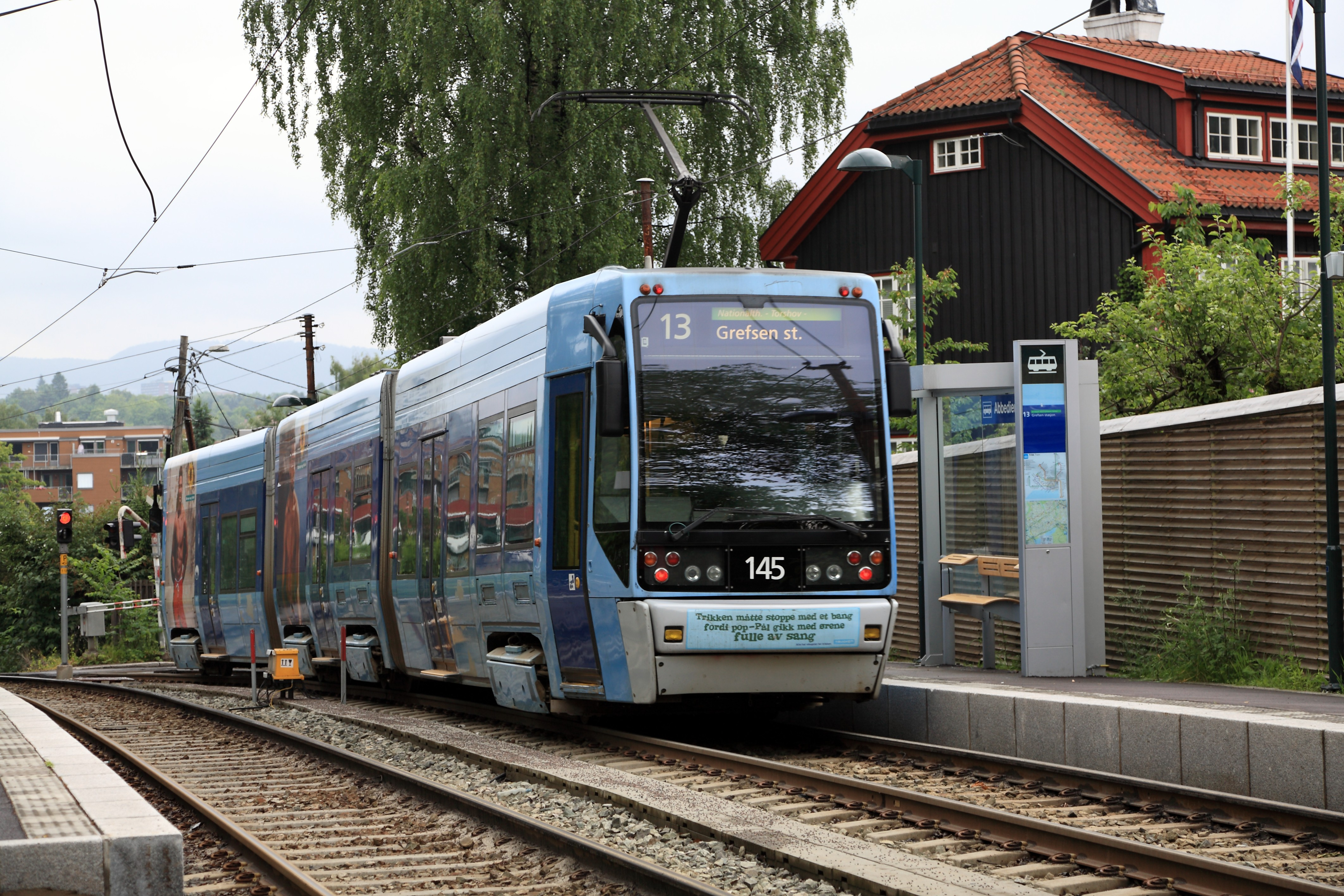
- SL95 tram at Abbediengen

Overview
- Native name: Lilleakerbanen
- Owner: Sporveien
- Termini: Skøyen; Øraker
- Stations: 9

Service
- Type: Tramway
- System: Oslo Tramway
- Operator(s): Sporveien Trikken
- Rolling stock: SL18

History
- Opened: 9 May 1919

Technical
- Line length: 3.8 km (2.4 mi)
- Number of tracks: Double
- Track gauge: 1,435 mm (4 ft 8 1/2 in)
- Electrification: 750 V DC overhead wire

The Lilleaker Line (Norwegian: Lilleakerbanen) is a suburban tramway from Skøyen in Oslo westwards to Øraker, Bærum in Norway. It is operated by Line 13 from Ljabru to Øraker of the Oslo Tramway, operated by Oslo Sporvognsdrift.

== Route ==
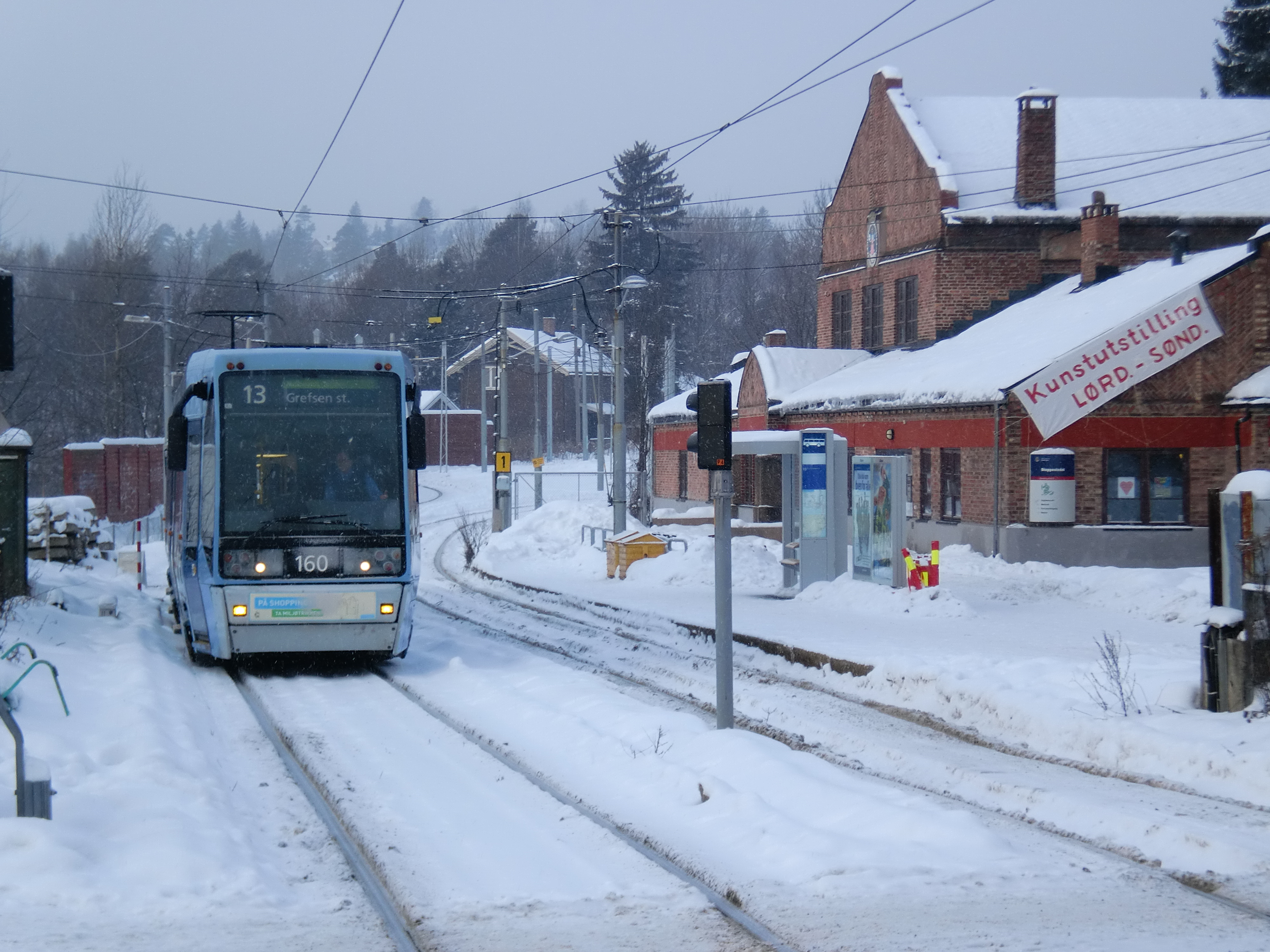
SL95 tram at Lilleaker

The Lilleaker Line runs 3.8 kilometres (2.4 mi) from Skøyen to Jar. The line is a standard gauge, double track light rail line with 750 volt overhead wire. At Skøyen it connects with the Skøyen Line of the Oslo Tramway and at Jar to the Kolsås Line of the Oslo Metro. Most of the route is dominated by housing. At Skøyen, there is a short walk to Skøyen Station on the mainline Drammen Line. It serves all west-bound trains of the Oslo Commuter Rail, some regional trains and the Airport Express Train. The station is also an important bus hub serving several routes.

The route continues via Hoff and Abbdediengen and Ullern. Previously a station was located at Bestum, but this was closed due to the vicinity to Ullern. The line then passes Furulund and Sollerud before reaching Lilleaker. The latter serves the northern parts of Lysaker as well as the shopping center CC Vest.

== Service ==
The line is owned by Sporveien and operated by Oslo Sporvognsdrift on contract with Ruter. The line is served using a mix of SL79 and SL95 trams, operating at a ten-minute headway. The services terminate at Bekkestua. The line is served by no. 13, that continues from Skøyen along the Skøyen line to the city center and onwards along the Ekeberg Line to Ljabru.

== History ==
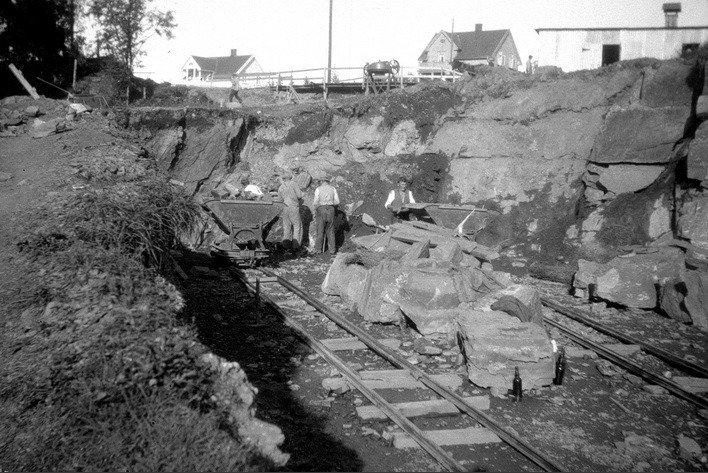
Construction of the extension from Bekkestua to Haslum in 1922

In 1912, Kristiania Elektriske Sporvei started working on plans to extend the street tram Skøyen Line towards Bestum or Øraker. The application for the section from Skøyen to Lilleaker was sent in 1913 and concession was granted in July 1915. Construction began immediately, trial runs were made on 8 May 1919 and the line opened the following day.

In 1917, two proposals were made for a suburban tram line further north. The southern proposal was to build the line as an extension of the Lilleaker Line. The line would go from Lilleaker and extend towards Jar and Nadderud to Haslum. The northern proposal was for an extension of the Røa Line (at the time called the Smestad Line) via Røa to Hosle, Haslum and Fleskum to Kolsås. The latter was essentially a combination of the current Røa and Kolsås Line. The two proposals caused local debate with people in western Bærum in general supporting the northern line and people in eastern Bærum supporting the southern line. An agreement was quickly reached with Kristiania Elektriske Sporvei (KES), that owned the Lilleaker Line. In 1921, the municipal council voted in favor of the southern line after rejecting a proposal to negotiate trackage rights with Holmenkolbanen. The main argument for the southern alternative was that the municipality would not have to pay any of the investment costs for the section of the line that would be localed within Aker.

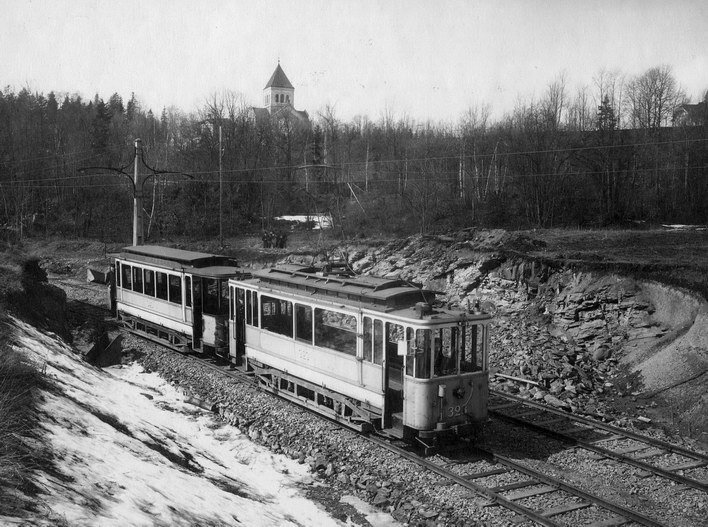
Class SS trams during trial runs in 1919

In 1924, KES' operations in Oslo were expropriated and became Oslo Sporveier. However, the Lilleaker Line was kept outside the expropriation. The expansion to Bærum was financed in part by the cash from the sale and in part from free land from the municipality. Concession from Lilleaker to Bekkestua was granted in 1922, and on 28 December the municipality voted to extend the line from Bekkestua to Haslum. The line to Bekkestua opened on 1 July 1924 and the extension to Hslum on 4 November. KES rebranded itself and became Bærumsbanen. The company bought twelve Class A trams with twelve trailers from Zypen & Charlier of Germany. After running along the Bærum Line to Skøyen, the trams continued along the Oslo Sporveier-owned Skøyen Line to Athenæum in the center of Oslo. The stations had a small building where there was a kiosk, telephone, ticket sale and freight handling.

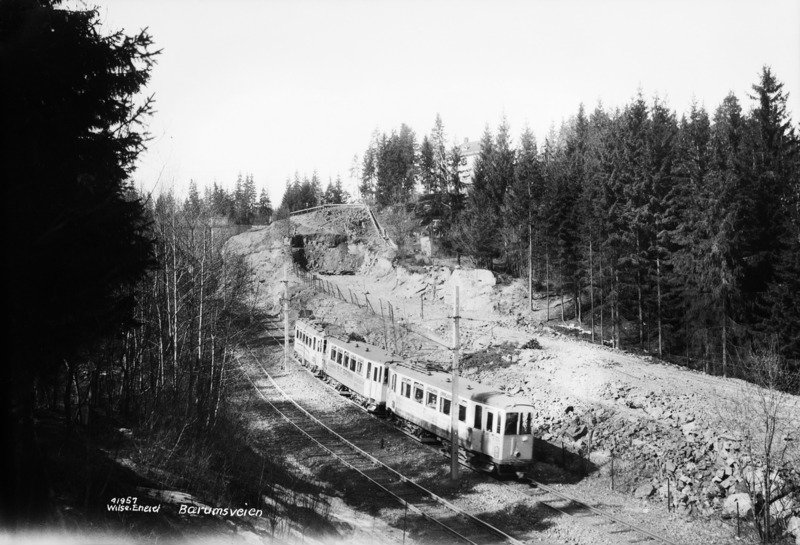
Class A tram on the line in 1935

The Bærum Line was extended to Kolsås on 1 January 1930. In 1924, one of the conditions for the concession was that the line was to be connected to the Common Tunnel of the Holenkollen Line. Oslo Municipality demanded that the company either turn its trams at Skøyen or allow the municipality to purchase the company cheap. On 1 October 1934, Bærumsbanen was bought by Oslo Sporveier and made a subsidiary. The two companies had a common executive management, but retained separate operations. At the same time, Aker Municipality's tram company Akersbanerne was left operating a single line east of the city center. In 1936, it was decided that Bærumsbanen would take over operation of this line, by operating the trams from the Kolsås Line through the city center to connect to the Østensjø Line. Operations started on 4 January 1937, and the 25 kilometres (16 mi) line was marketed as the Østensjø–Bærum Line. Although Bærumsbanen took over Akersbanerne's three Class A trams, up to three units from Ekebergbanen were also leased.

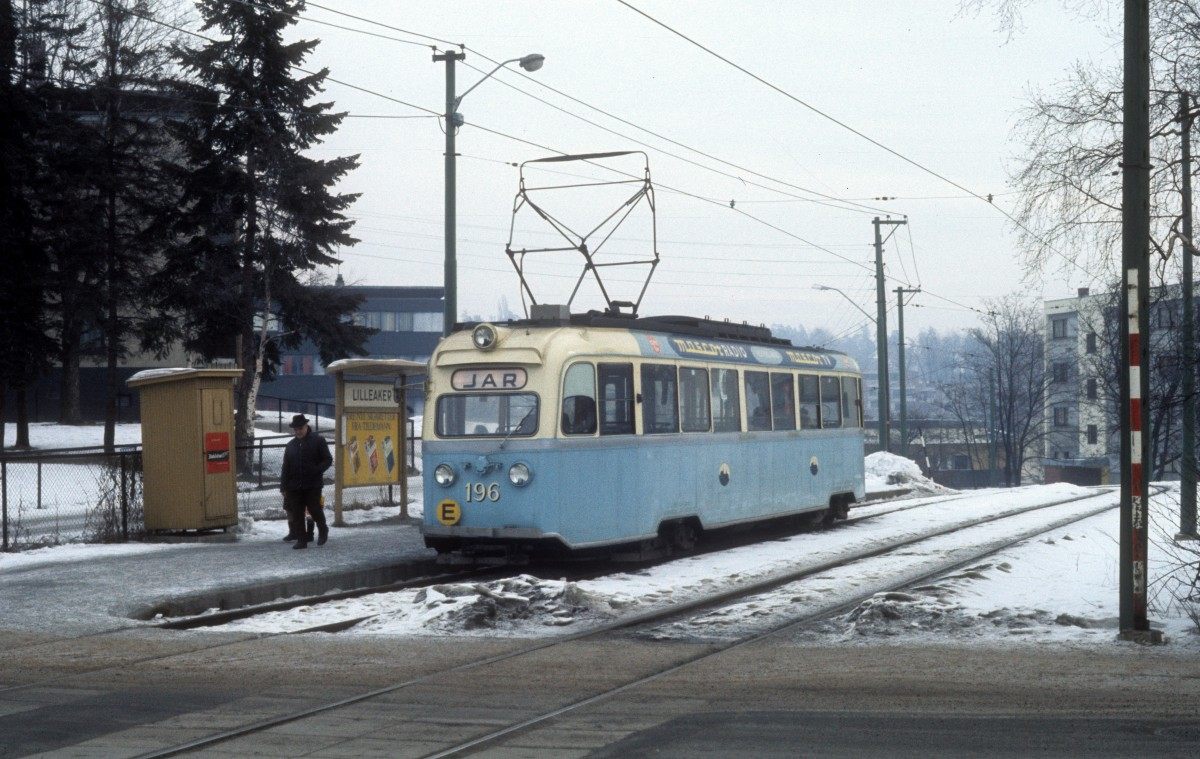
Gullfisk tram at Lilleaker in 1975

From 1937 to 1939, Oslo Sporveier received 46 Class B trams (the Gullfisk), of which half were transferred to Bærumsbanen and set to supplement the Class A. In 1939, construction of a connection from Jar to Sørbyhaugen on the Røa Line was started. When it opened on 15 June 1942, the 11.9 kilometres (7.4 mi) section from Sørbyhaugen to Kolsås was designated the Kolsås Line, and the 3.8 kilometres (2.4 mi) section from Jar to Skøyen was designated as the Lilleaker Line. A balloon loop was built at Jar, and the Lilleaker Line trams that served the Lilleaker Line could start turning there. This allowed for transfer between the two lines. In 1944, the ownership of rolling stock and all but two employees in Bærumsbanen were transferred to Oslo Sporveier. However, the ownership of the tracks and the formal operation rights remained with Bærumsbanen.

At the end of the war in 1945, the line was in need of a major overhaul, in particular the overhead wires. Lack of materials and money caused the extraordinary maintenance to take four years. Limitations of freight were imposed in 1946, and were terminated the following year. At the same time, the Kolsås Line services were internally numbered 9, but it was first many years later that the number appeared on the destination signs and schedules. Until 1951, the line had had constant fares since 1939; a 27% fare increase in 1951 was not sufficient to cover the 170% cost increase in the same period. The following year, Oslo Sporveier's Gullfisk were transferred to Bærumsbanen and designated Class E.

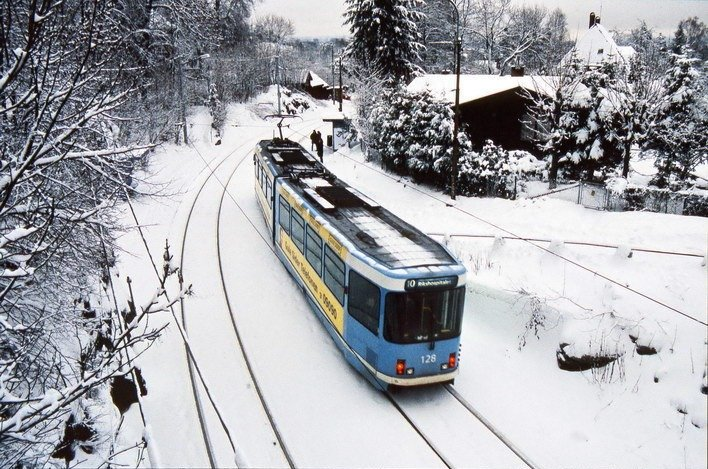
SL79 tram at Ullern in 2000

The Østensjø Line was closed to be converted to the metro standard on 18 June 1967, and from that day Line 9 only went from Jar to Oslo Central Station. From 1 July 1970, the conductors were gradually removed on the Class B and E trams. In 1971, Bærumsbanen was liquidated and ownership and all aspects of operation of the line was transferred to Oslo Sporveier. The Lilleaker Line was connected to the Ekeberg Line from 29 September 1974. Class B and E were used during regular operation, but supplemented with SM53 trams during rush hour. The section of the Skøyen Line from Skøyen to Thune was moved on 17 November 1981, and upgraded to light rail. This caused Skøyen Station to be moved a few blocks from the Norwegian State Railways' Skøyen Station. From 1982, the articulated SL79 trams were taken into use. Regular services during the 1980s and 1990s terminated at Jar, but night services operated all the way to Kolsås.

In February 2009, the part of the line west of Lilleaker was closed due to upgrades on the Kolsås Line. A balloon loop was constructed at Lilleaker to allow all trams to turn there. During construction, only the bi-directional SL95 trams could operate on the Skøyen–Lilleaker section. During the high-frequency (10-minute) schedule, Skøyen–Lilleaker is served by a shuttle tram with a transfer at Skøyen. During the low-frequency (20 minute) schedule, SL95 trams operate the entire Line 13 without any transfers needed. The curtailing of the line temporarily closed eliminated Øraker Station, despite local protests. The tram company indicated that reopening of the station might be possible if funds are available.
