= Husebybakken station =

Former Oslo metro station

Husebybakken

General information
- Location: Montebello, Oslo; Norway
- Coordinates: 59°56′13″N 10°40′13.8″E
- Line: Kolsås Line

Construction
- Structure type: At-grade

History
- Opened: 1942; 31 July 2006 (reopening)
- Closed: 19 June 1961; 31 May 2008 (second closure)
Location

Husebybakken was a metro station on the Kolsås Line of the Oslo Metro. Serving the neighborhood of Montebello in Oslo, Norway, it opened in 1942, when the connection line between Sørbyhaugen and Jar was opened. It was closed on 19 June 1961, but reopened from 31 July 2006 to 31 May 2008, when the rest of the Kolsås Line was being renovated. While in use, it served as the terminal station of the Kolsås Line, and for Line 6 of the metro. The station was demolished in 2008.

== History ==
In 1942, the Sørbyhaugen–Jar Line was opened, which connected the Kolsås Line with the Røa Line. On 5 July 1957, the southbound station Mærradalen was closed and Ullernåsen was moved midway between its old location and that of Mærradalen. On 19 June 1961, Husebybakken was closed.

In 1995, the Røa Line, which the Kolsås Line branches off from, was upgraded to metro standard to allow trains to operate through the Common Tunnel in the city tunnel. The first section of the Kolsås Line, from the branching point to Montebello was also upgraded. Trains switched from overhead wire to third rail at Montebello. By early 2006, the Akershus County Council passed an upgrade plan for the Kolsås Line. It would be upgraded to metro standard all the way to Kolsås, and while under construction, the sections of the line not yet upgraded will remain closed. The first section be upgraded, was from Montebello to Åsjordet. Because the upgrade included an extension of the stations to allow six-car trains, Montebello would need to be closed. Since the track until Montebello had full metro standard, building a temporary station in the area would allow the area to be served by the T-bane, and at the same time give the trains on line 6 a turning station.

Husebybakken was closed on 31 May 2008. The line did not reopen until 18 August, when the three first stations were finished upgraded to metro standard: Montebello, Ullernåsen and Åsjordet. During the intermezzo, trains turned at Holmen on the Røa Line. Following its closing, Husebybakken was demolished.

== Service ==
Husebybakken was the temporary terminus of the Kolsås Line while it existed. It was served by line 6 of the T-bane each fifteen minutes. Line 6 continued along the Røa Line, before entering the Common Tunnel to the city center. On the other end of the city center, the line followed the Ring Line. The station was served every 15 minutes during regular service hours.
