= Bjørnsletta station (1942–2006) =

Former Oslo metro station

Bjørnsletta
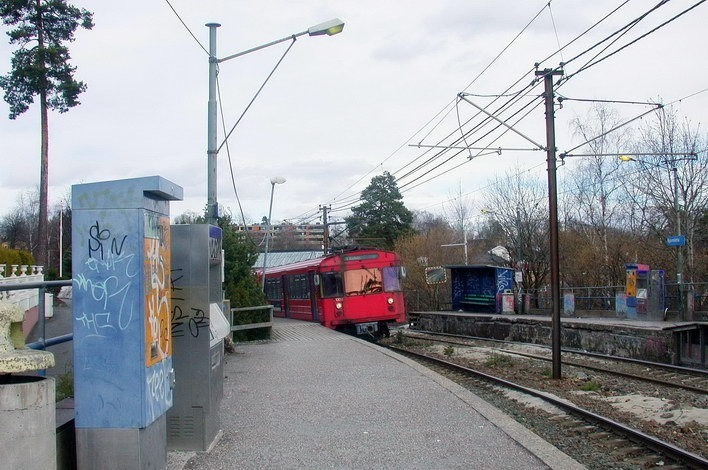
- Old Bjørnsletta Station in 2006

General information
- Location: Ullern, Oslo; Norway
- Coordinates: 59.927109°N 10.640259°E
- Elevation: 81.3 m (267 ft)
- Line: Kolsås Line
- Distance: 7.8 km (4.8 mi)

Construction
- Structure type: At-grade

History
- Opened: 15 June 1942
Location

Bjørnsletta was a station on the Kolsås Line (line 6) of the Oslo Metro in Norway. Located between the Åsjordet and Lysakerelven stations in the Ullern borough, Bjørnsletta was—along with Frøen—the only station on the subway network lacking step-free access to the platforms. The station was opened on 15 June 1942 when the line from Sørbyhaugen to Jar had been completed. Along with most of the line, Bjørnsletta was closed for upgrades on 1 July 2006; passenger service was temporarily provided by bus line 43. When the renovation was finished on 17 August 2010, Bjørnsletta and Lysakerelven stations were replaced by a new station, also named Bjørnsletta, placed in between.
