= Montebello station =

Oslo metro station

Montebello
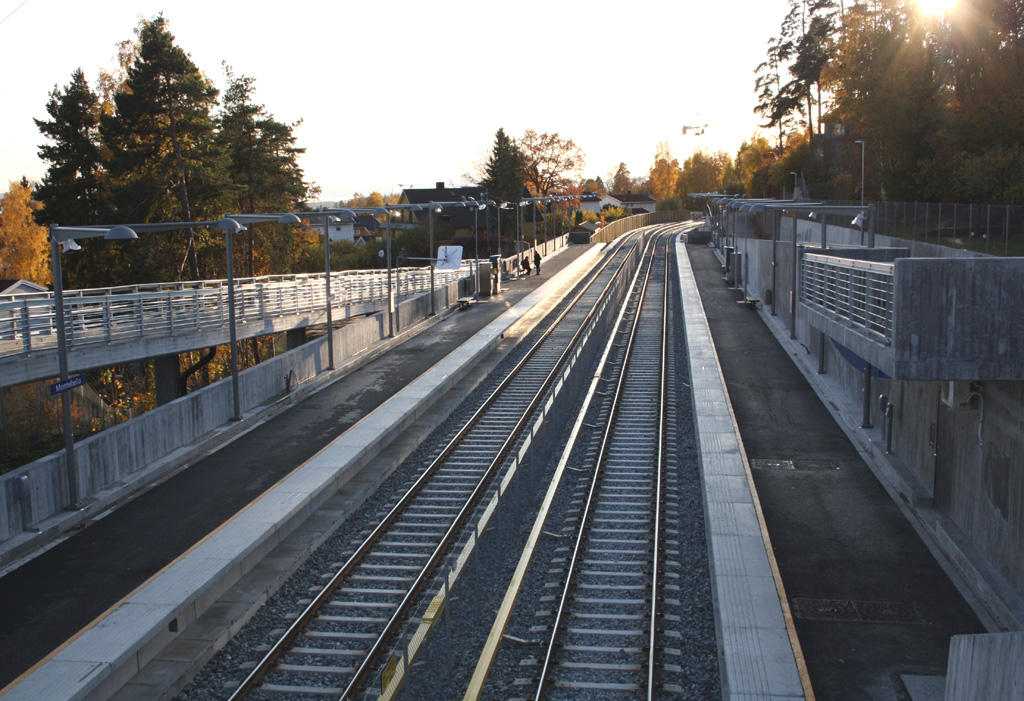

General information
- Location: Montebello, Oslo; Norway
- Coordinates: 59°56′5″N 10°40′6″E
- Owner: Sporveien
- Operator: Sporveien T-banen
- Line: Kolsås Line
- Distance: 6.0 km (3.7 mi) from Stortinget

Construction
- Structure type: At-grade
- Accessible: Yes

Other information
- Fare zone: 1

History
- Opened: 15 June 1942; 84 years ago
- Rebuilt: 1 July 2006 - 18 August 2008

Services
Preceding station	Oslo Metro	Following station
Ullernåsen towards Kolsås	Line 3 Kolsås Line	Smestad towards Mortensrud
Location

Montebello is a station on the Kolsås Line (Line 3) of the Oslo Metro. The station is located between Smestad and Ullernåsen. Montebello is the first station on line 3 not shared with another line. The station is on the north side of the Ring 3 highway which runs in an arch north of Oslo. It is the closest station to the Radium Hospital which is 400 m away. Montebello is located 6.0 km from Stortinget and was first opened on 15 June 1942.

From 1 July 2006, most of the line to Kolsås, from Montebello station and outwards, was closed for upgrades. At first trains then turned at Montebello, but from 31 July Montebello was also closed with the opening of a temporary station, Husebybakken which substituted for Montebello. This temporary station was located a few hundred metres to the east of the regular station and served as the terminus for the line. On 18 August 2008, the rebuilt Montebello station was opened. The new station has a longer platform, capable of serving trains with up to six cars, an increase from three. The previous level crossing has been removed, and a third rail power supply is used throughout. Up to the upgrade of Kolsåsbanen that started in 2006, trains switched from third rail to overhead wire systems at Montebello.
