= Ullern tram stop =

Light rail station in Oslo, Norway

Ullern
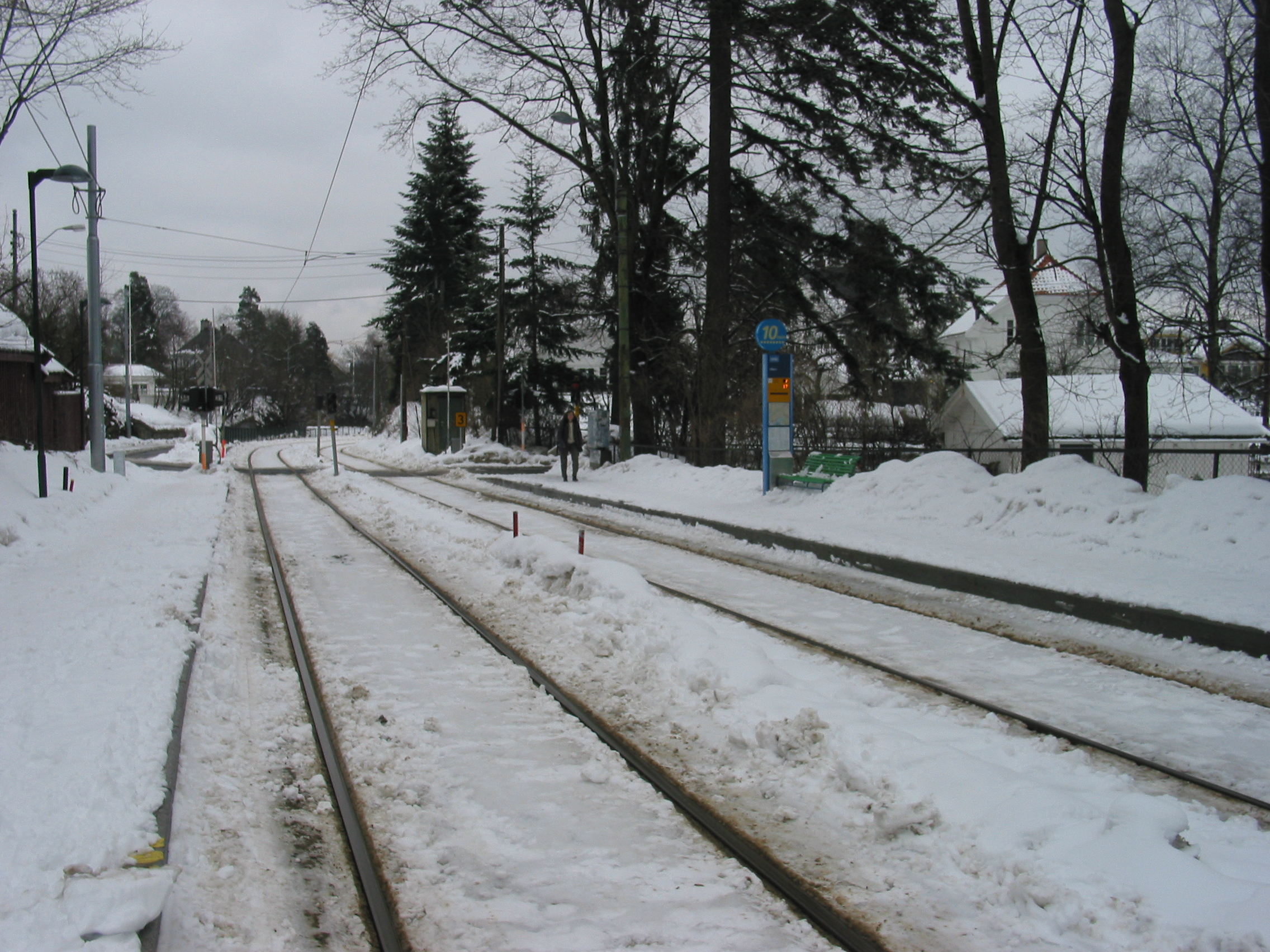
- The station platform, March 2009.

General information
- Location: Ullern, Oslo; Norway
- Coordinates: 59.924291°N 10.658583°E
- Line: Lilleaker Line

History
- Opened: 1919

Services
Preceding station	Trams in Oslo	Following station
Furulund towards Bekkestua	Line 13	Abbediengen towards Ljabru
Bestum Closed 2004 towards Bekkestua	Line 13	Abbediengen towards Ljabru
Location

Ullern tram stop is an Oslo Tramway or light rail station between Furulund (Bestum) and Abbediengen opened in 1919 at Ullern in the Oslo borough of Ullern on the Lilleaker Line (an extension of the Skøyen Line) of the Kristiania Elektriske Sporvei. The station is served by Line 13.
