= Lilleaker tram stop =

Tram stop in Oslo, Norway

Lilleaker
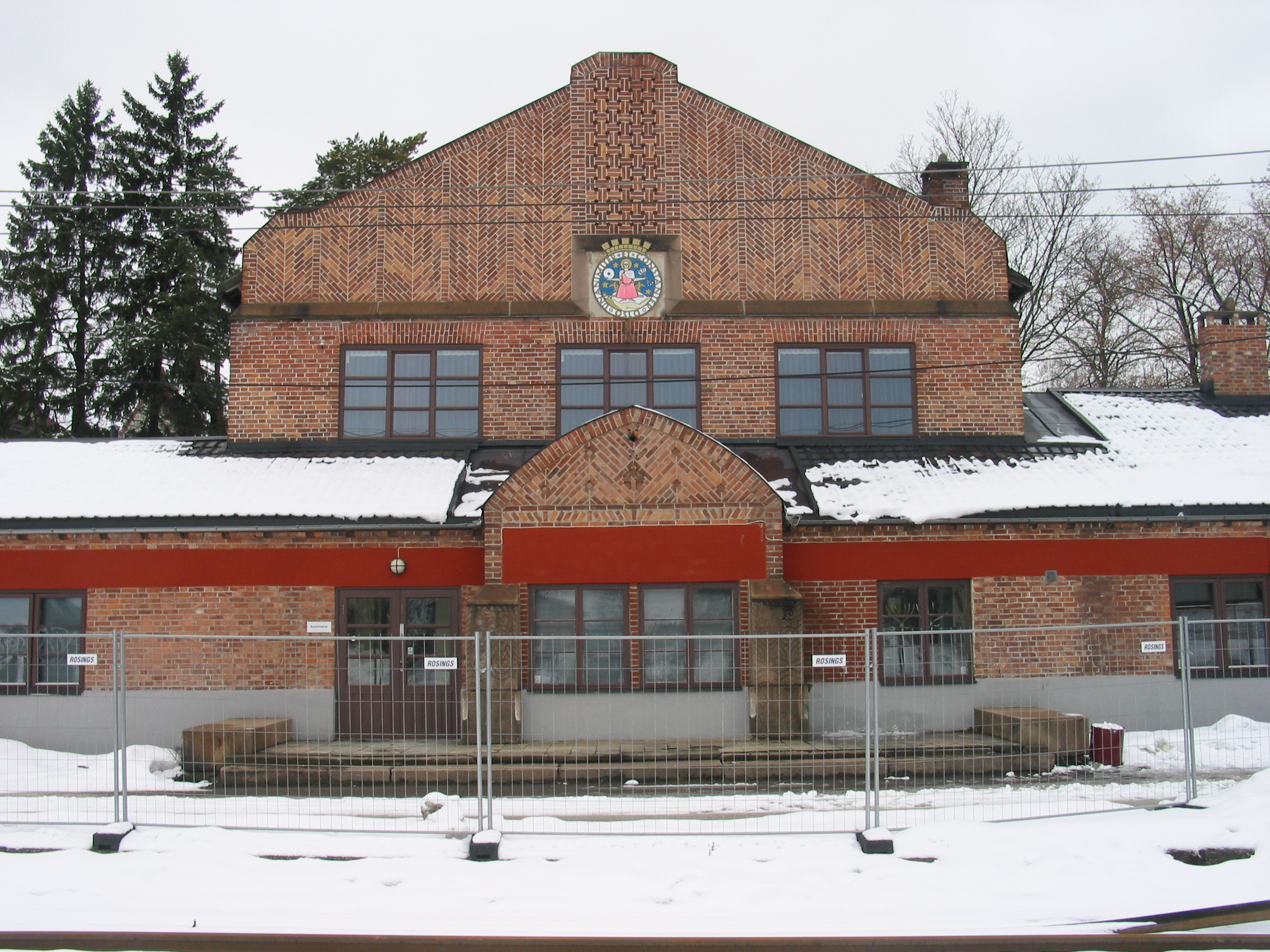
- Lilleaker station building, 2009.

General information
- Location: Lilleaker, Ullern, Oslo; Norway
- Coordinates: 59.920742°N 10.635795°E
- Line: Lilleaker Line
- Connections: Local Bus: 23 & 42

History
- Opened: 1919
- Original company: Kristiania Elektriske Sporvei
Location

Lilleaker is a light rail station on the Oslo Tramway.

Located at Lilleaker in Ullern, it was the terminus of the Lilleaker Line when it was opened in 1919 by Kristiania Elektriske Sporvei as an extension of the Skøyen Line (Øraker was the original name). In 1924 the Lilleaker Line was extended twice into Bærum, first to Bekkestua and then to Avløs.

During the schedule, SL95 trams operate the entire line 13 without any transfers needed. When a balloon loop was constructed at Lilleaker the single-directional trams could turn there.

From 1 December 2010, the line 13 doesn't have its terminus at Lilleaker´. After extensive work with the Metro/Tram tracks at Jar the Lilleaker Line terminates at Bekkestua. At peak hours every second tram is a SL79 and turns at Lilleaker.

Preceding station	Trams in Oslo	Following station
Øraker towards Bekkestua	Line 13	Sollerud towards Ljabru
