= Lysakerelven station =

Former Oslo metro station

Lysakerelven
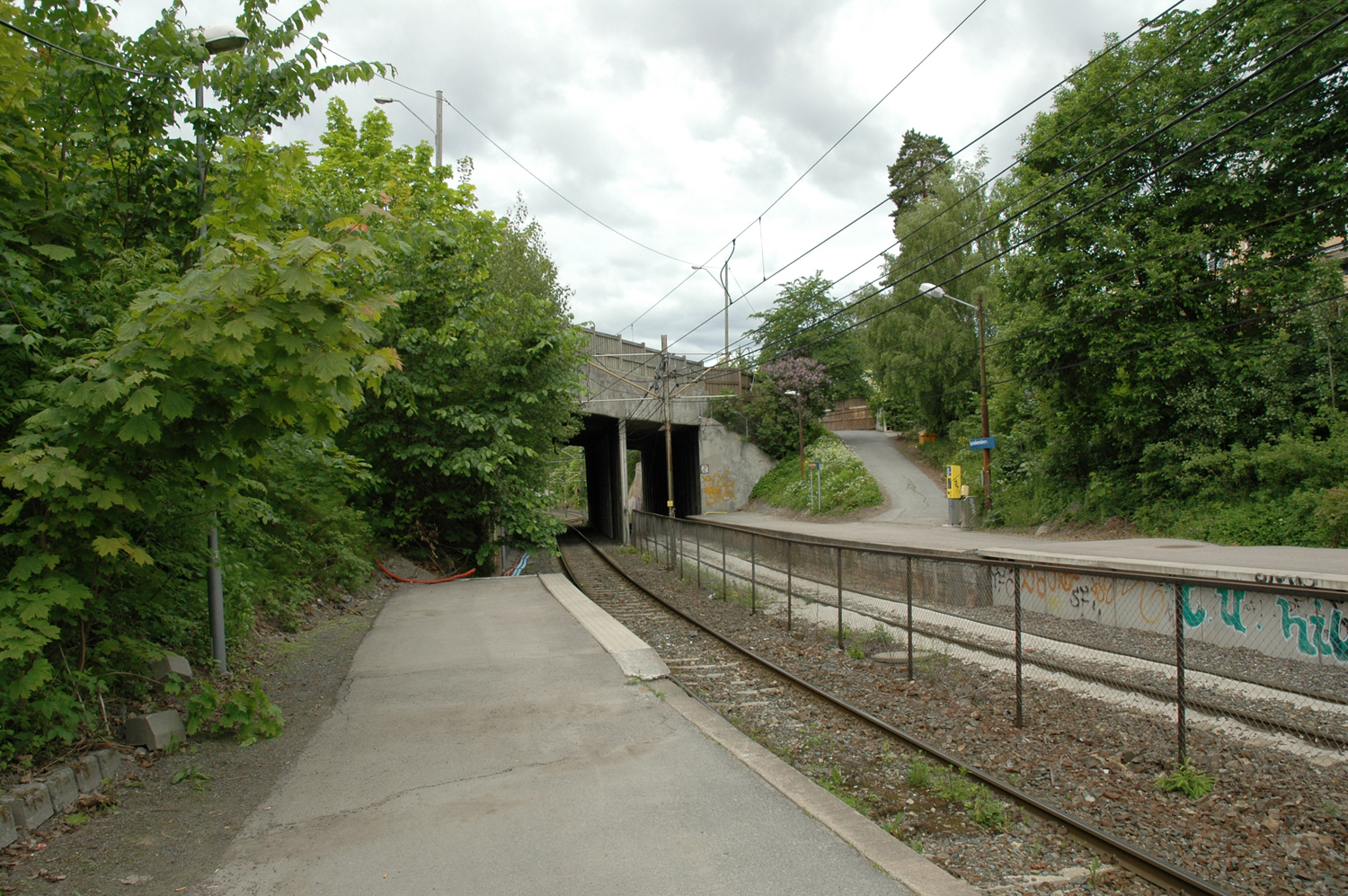

General information
- Location: Øraker, Ullern, Oslo; Norway
- Coordinates: 59.9260°N 10.6310°E
- Line: Kolsås Line
- Distance: 8.4 km (5.2 mi)

Construction
- Structure type: At-grade

History
- Opened: 15 June 1942
- Closed: 2006
Location

Lysakerelven is a former station in western Oslo on the Kolsås Line of the Oslo T-bane network, between the stations of Bjørnsletta and Jar, 8.4 kilometers (5.2 mi) from Stortinget. It was the last station within Oslo's boundaries before the line continues into Bærum; taking its name from the river Lysakerelven which is the boundary between Oslo and Bærum.

The station was opened on 15 June 1942. Along with most of the line, Lysakerelven closed for upgrades since 1 July 2006.

The future status of the Kolsås Line was debated, and one suggestion which was made was to end the line's subway service in Bærum entirely and replace it with trams, making Lysakerelven the end station. This option proved unpopular with passengers. Instead Lysakerelven and Bjørnsletta were merged into a new station located between them that took take the name of Bjørnsletta.
