= Furulund tram stop =

Tram stop in Oslo Municipality, Norway

Furulund
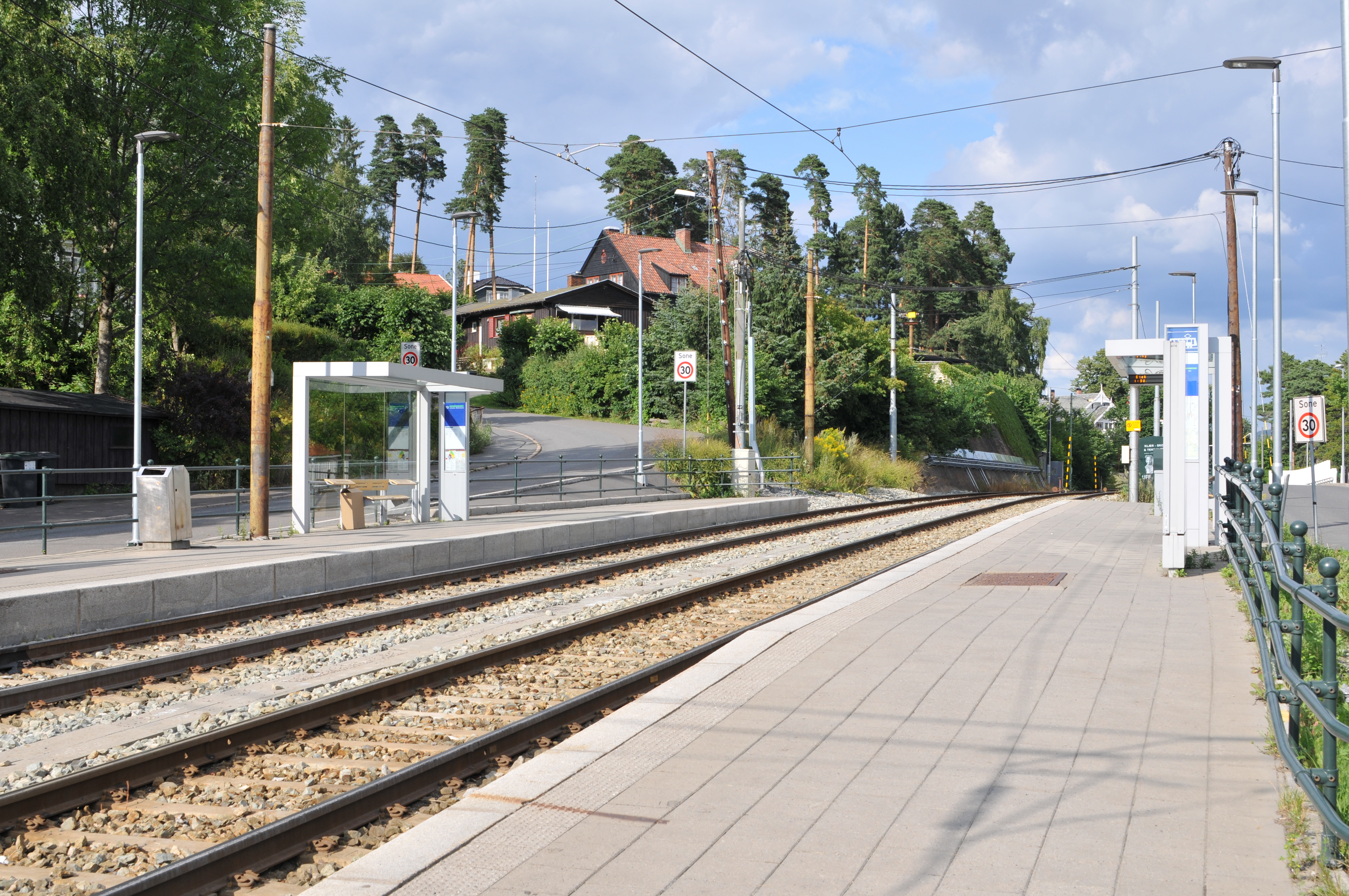
- The station platform, July 2014.

General information
- Location: Ullern, Oslo; Norway
- Coordinates: 59.919903°N 10.650129°E
- Line: Lilleaker Line

History
- Opened: 1919
Location

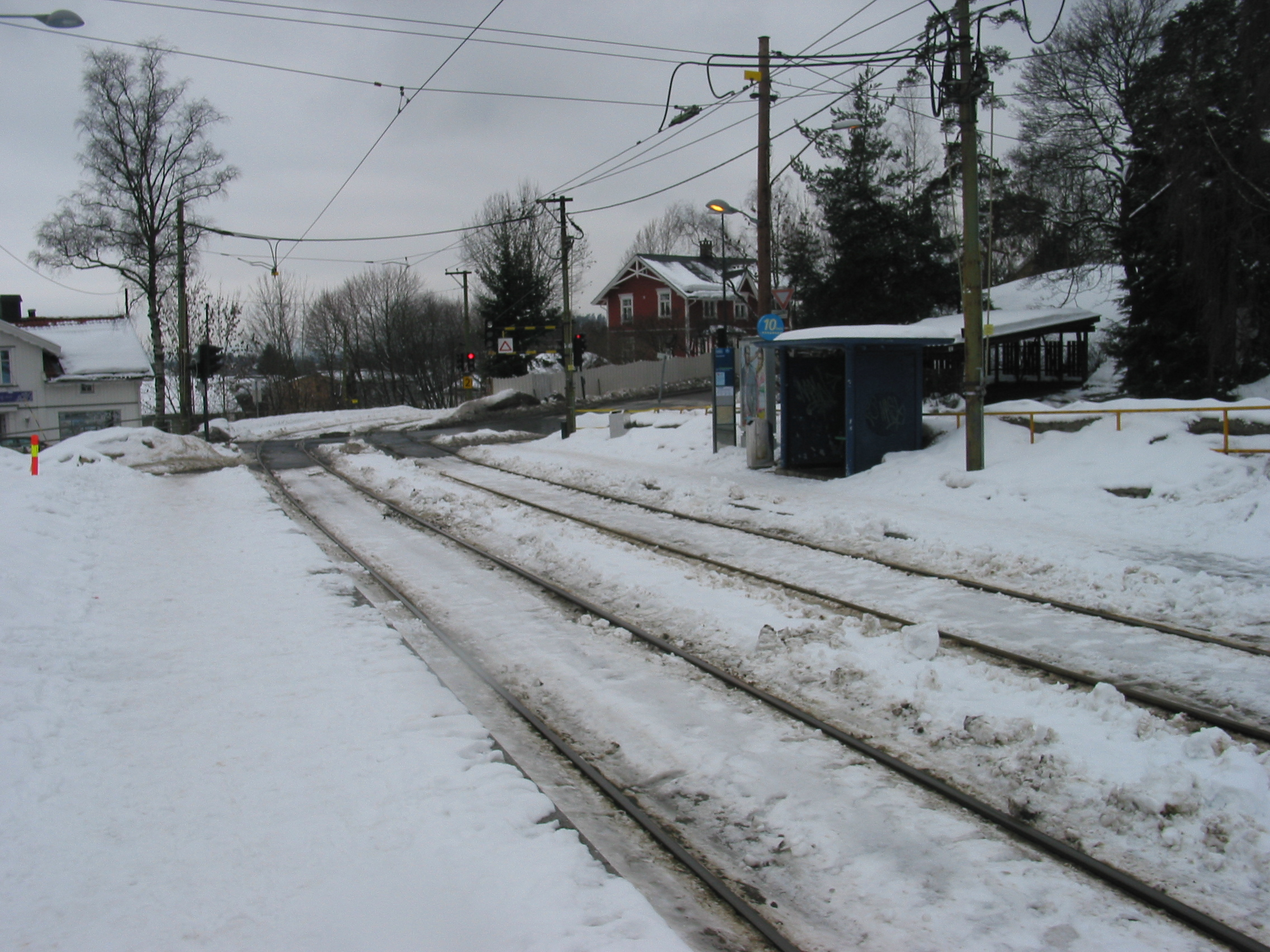
The station platform, March 2009.

Furulund is a light rail station on the Oslo Tramway.

It is located north of Vækerø in Ullern borough.

== History ==
It was opened by Kristiania Elektriske Sporvei together with the rest of the Lilleaker Line, as an extension of the Skøyen Line.

During the last part of World War Two, the station was out of commission; parts of the Furulund neighborhood (or Furulunden) were seized for use by Gestapo as headquarters.

Preceding station	Trams in Oslo	Following station
Sollerud towards Bekkestua	Line 13	Ullern towards Ljabru
Sollerud towards Bekkestua	Line 13	Bestum Closed in 2004 towards Ljabru
