= Øraker tram stop =

Tram stop in Oslo, Norway

Øraker
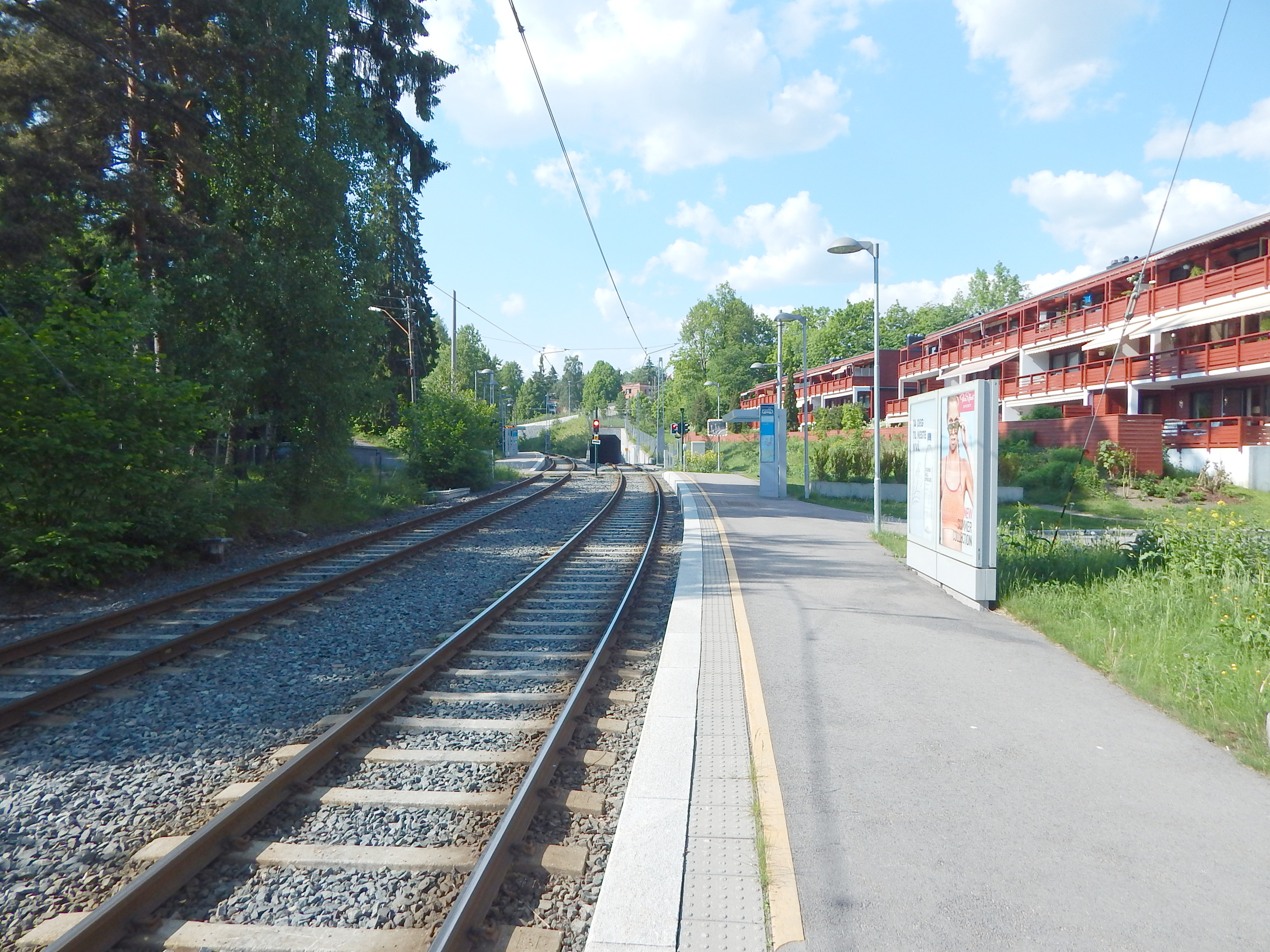

General information
- Location: Øraker, Ullern, Oslo; Norway
- Coordinates: 59.924850°N 10.630130°E
- Line: Lilleaker Line

History
- Opened: 1924

Services
Preceding station	Trams in Oslo	Following station
Jar towards Bekkestua	Line 13	Lilleaker towards Ljabru
Location

Øraker is a light rail station on the Oslo Tramway.

Located at Øraker in Ullern, it was opened in 1924, when the Lilleaker Line was extended to Jar.

In February 2009, the part of the line west of Lilleaker station was closed due to upgrades on the Kolsås Line. The curtailing of the line eliminated Øraker station for the time being, disappointing the area residents.

On 1 December 2010 the Station was reopened after extensive work being done to the next station Jar.

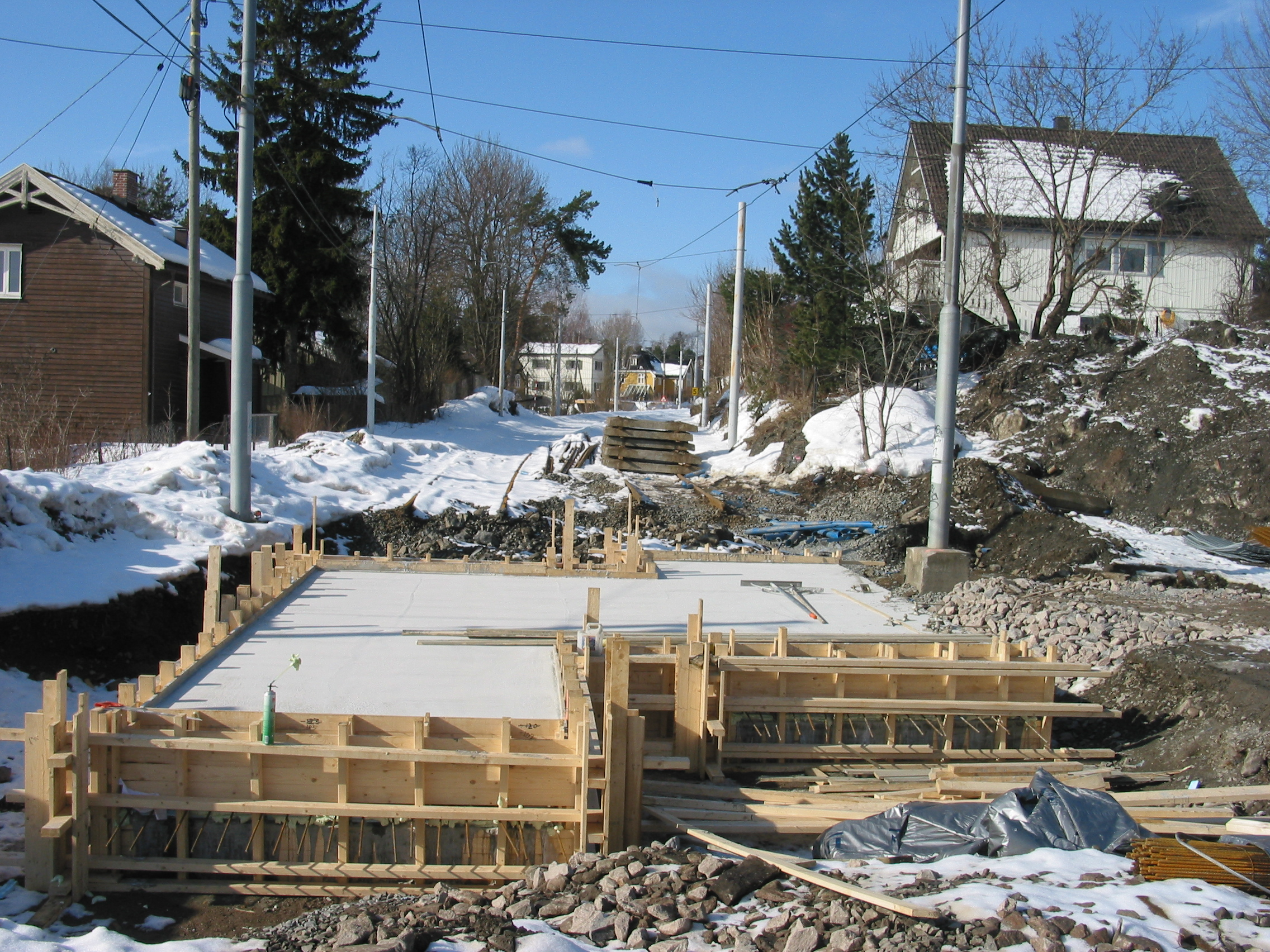
The rail tracks, replaced by another construction, immediately west of Lilleaker station, 2009
