= Hoff tram stop =

Tram stop in Oslo, Norway

Hoff
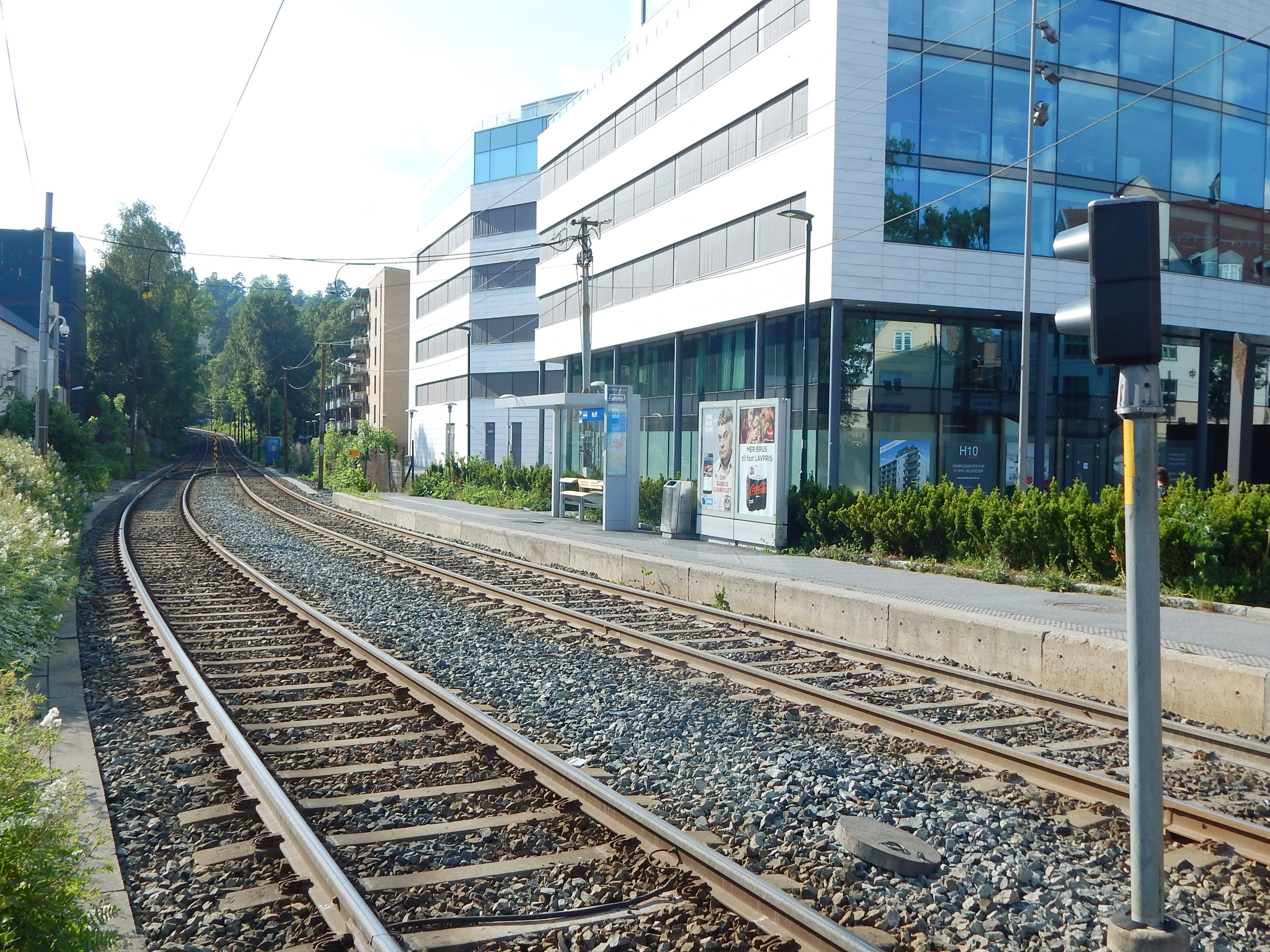

General information
- Location: Hoff, Ullern, Oslo; Norway
- Coordinates: 59.9250010°N 10.6748779°E
- Line: Lilleaker Line
- Connections: Bus: 40 Øvre Sogn - Skøyen

History
- Opened: 1919
Location

Hoff tran stop is an Oslo Tramway or light rail station opened in 1919 at Hoff in the Oslo borough of Ullern on the Lilleaker Line (an extension of the Skøyen Line) of the Kristiania Elektriske Sporvei. The station is served by Line 13. It is served by Line 13.

Preceding station	Trams in Oslo	Following station
Abbediengen towards Bekkestua	Line 13	Skøyen towards Ljabru
