= Sollerud tram stop =

Tram stop in Oslo, Norway

Sollerud
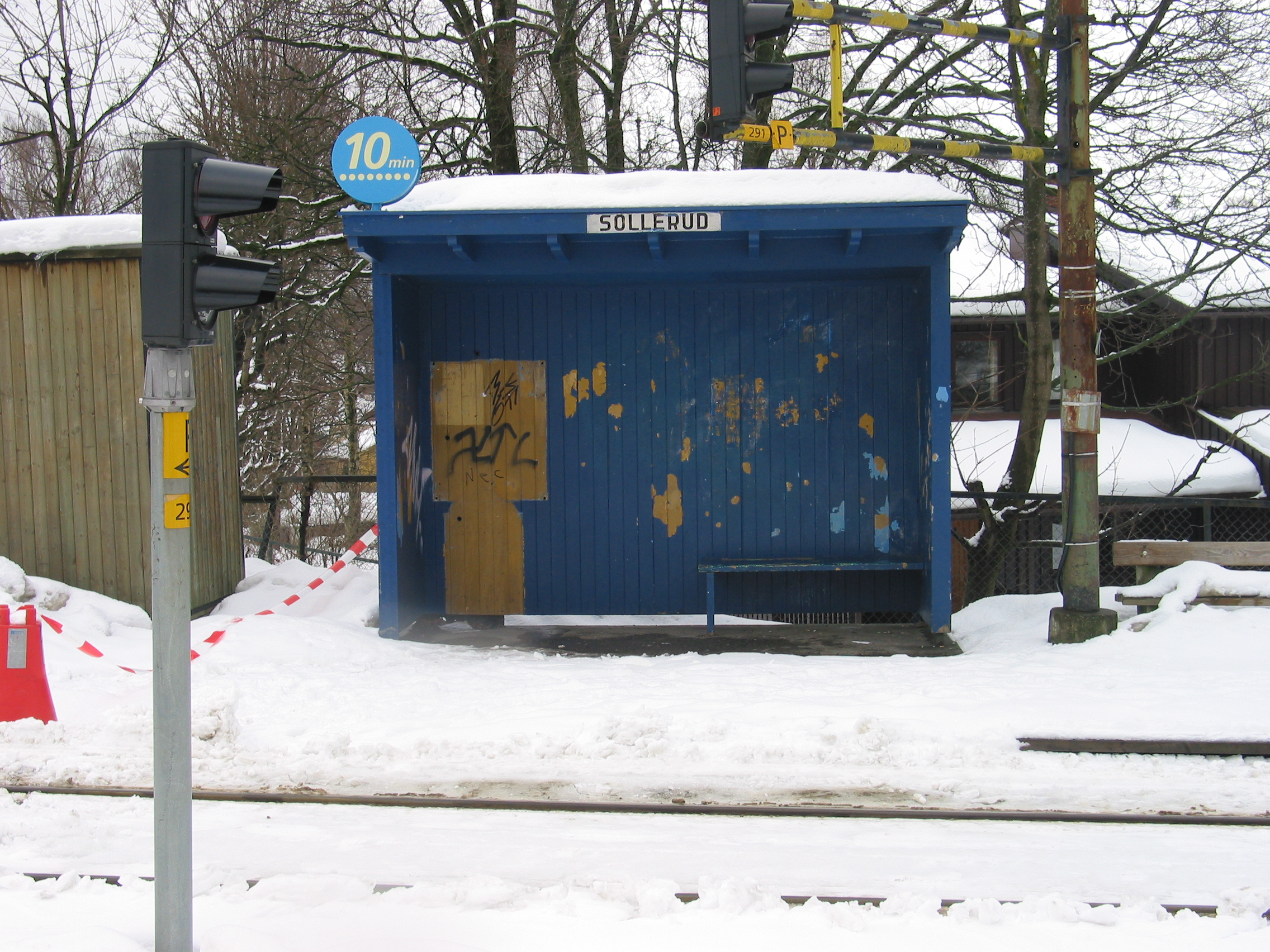
- Old-fashioned shack for passengers, March 2009.

General information
- Location: Sollerud, Ullern, Oslo; Norway
- Coordinates: 59.921043°N 10.643091°E
- Line: Lilleaker Line

History
- Opened: 1919
Location

Sollerud tram stop is an Oslo Tramway or light rail station opened in 1919 at Sollerud in the Oslo borough of Ullern on the Lilleaker Line (an extension of the Skøyen Line) of the Kristiania Elektriske Sporvei. The station is served by Line 13.

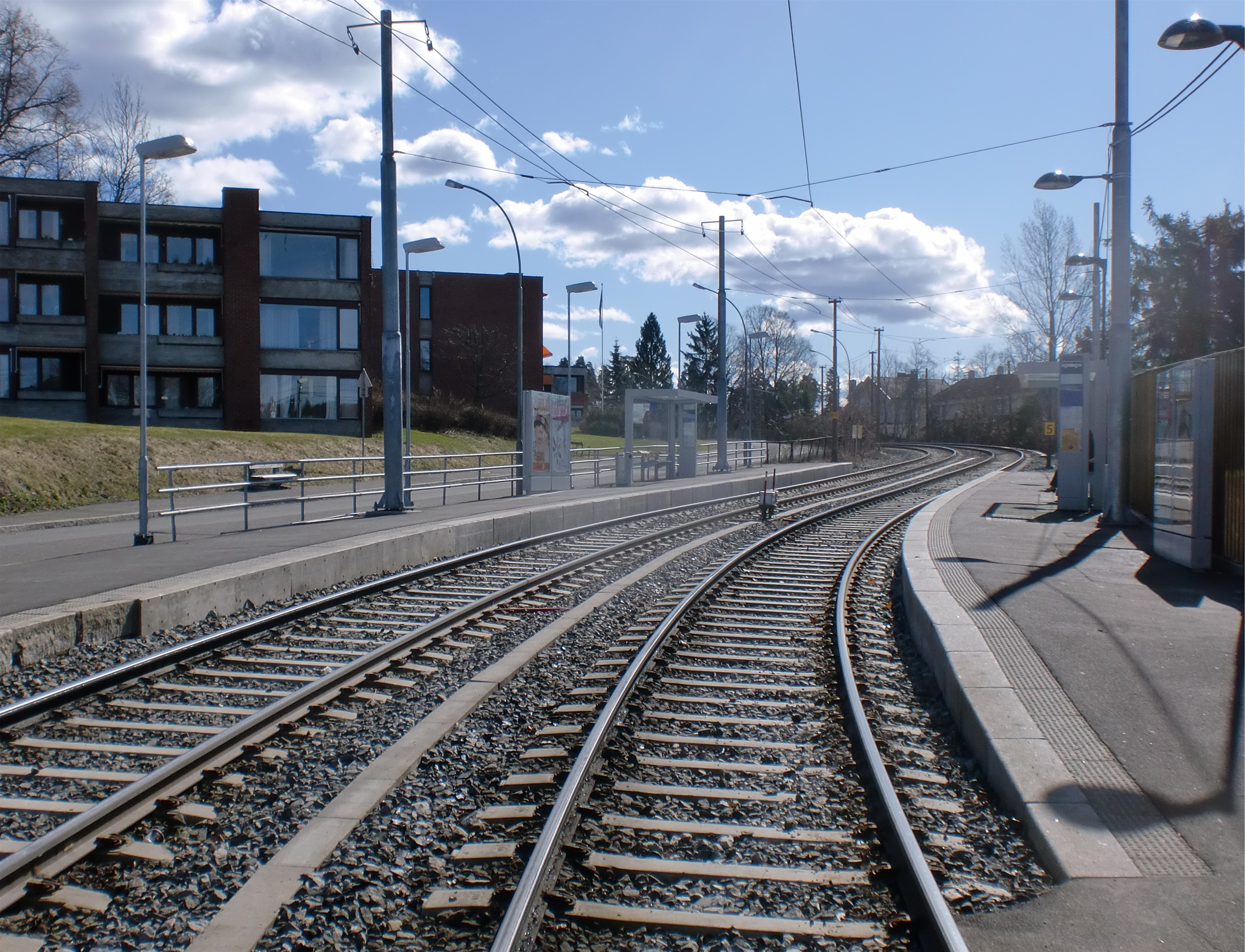
Station in spring

Preceding station	Trams in Oslo	Following station
Lilleaker towards Bekkestua	Line 13	Furulund towards Ljabru
