= Abbediengen tram stop =

Tram stop in Oslo, Norway

Abbediengen
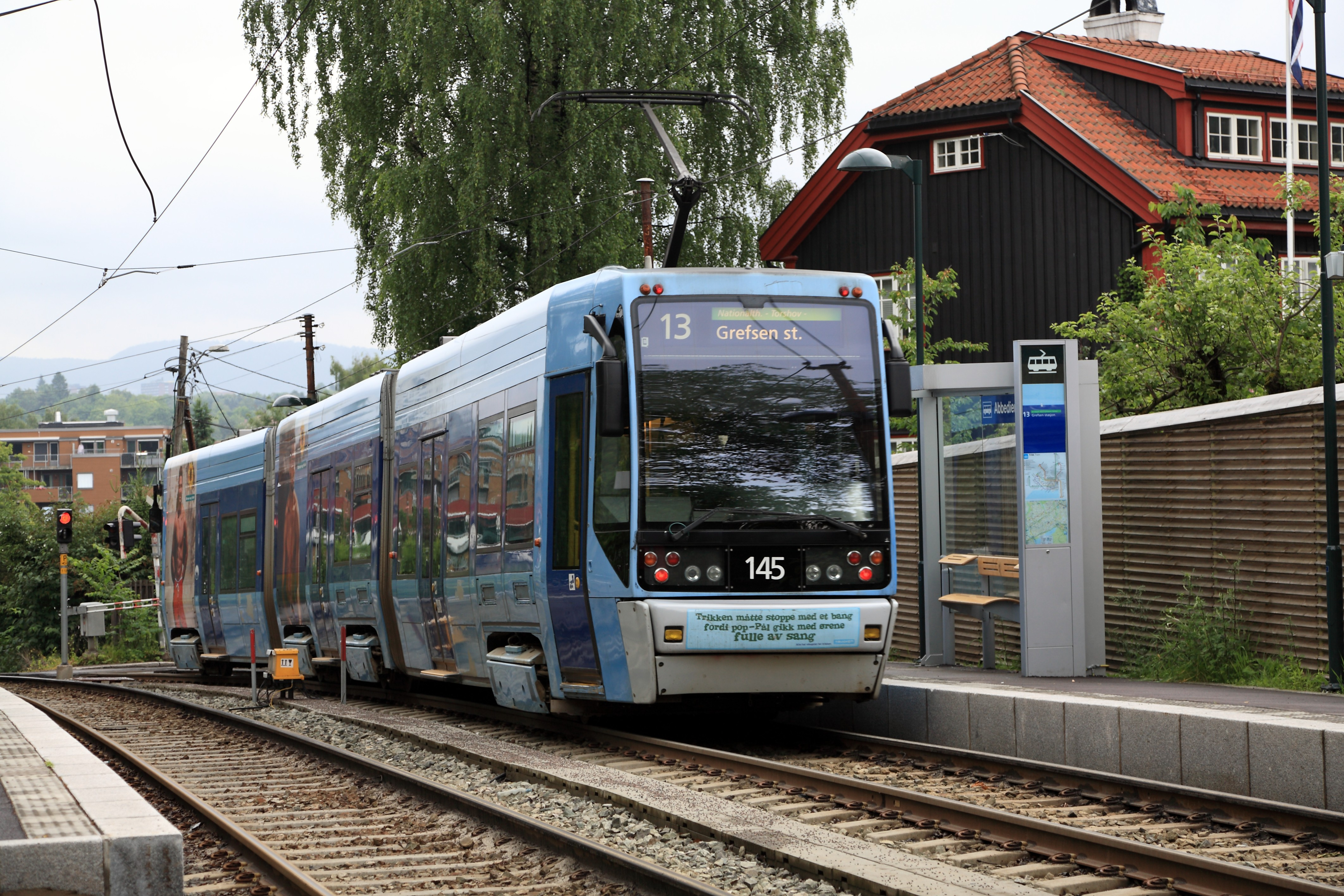

General information
- Location: Ullern, Oslo; Norway
- Coordinates: 59.9251702°N 10.6671599°E
- Line: Lilleaker Line

History
- Opened: 1919
Location

Abbediengen tram stop is an Oslo Tramway or light rail station opened in 1919 at Abbediengen in the Oslo borough of Ullern on the Lilleaker Line (an extension of the Skøyen Line) of the Kristiania Elektriske Sporvei. The station is served by Line 13.

Preceding station	Trams in Oslo	Following station
Ullern towards Bekkestua	Line 13	Hoff towards Ljabru
