= Bestum tram stop =

Oslo metro station

Coordinates: 59°55′20″N 10°39′20″E

Bestum

General information
- Location: Ullern, Oslo; Norway
- Line: Lilleaker Line

Other information
- Fare zone: Zone 1

History
- Opened: 1919
- Closed: 2004

Services
Preceding station	Trams in Oslo	Following station
Furulund towards Bekkestua	Line 13	Ullern towards Ljabru
Location

Bestum is a former light rail station on the Oslo Tramway.

The station was located at Bestum in Ullern, on the Lilleaker Line, between Ullern Station to the east and Furulund Station to the west.
