= Bjørnsletta station =

Oslo metro station

Bjørnsletta
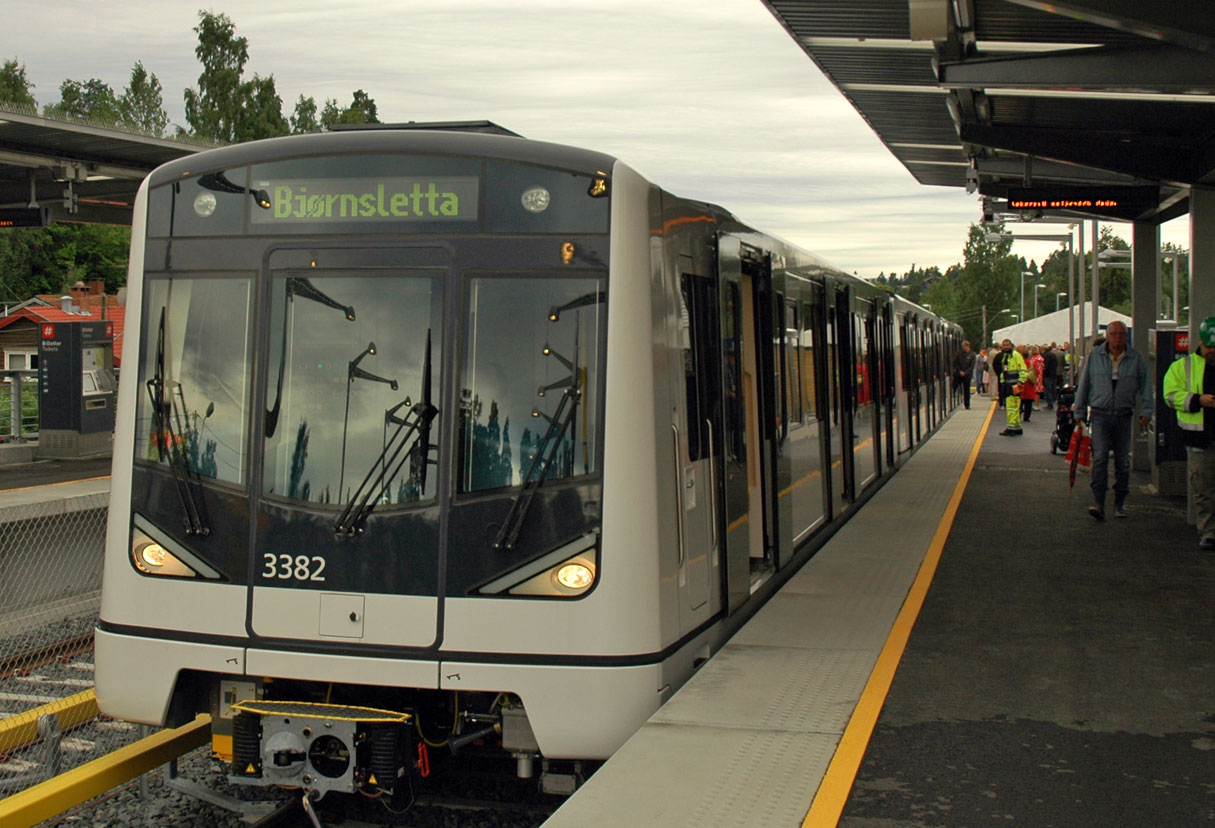
- Opening day at the station

General information
- Location: Øraker, Oslo; Norway
- Coordinates: 59°55′35″N 10°38′03″E
- Owner: Sporveien
- Operator: Sporveien T-banen
- Line: Kolsås Line
- Distance: 8.2 km (5.1 mi) from Stortinget
- Tracks: 2

Construction
- Structure type: At-grade
- Cycle facilities: Yes
- Accessible: Yes

Other information
- Fare zone: 1

History
- Opened: 17 August 2010; 16 years ago

Services
Preceding station	Oslo Metro	Following station
Jar towards Kolsås	Line 3 Kolsås Line	Åsjordet towards Mortensrud
Location

Bjørnsletta is a station on the Kolsås Line of the Oslo Metro. It serves the residential area of Øraker in Oslo, Norway and is served by Line 3. The station opened on 17 August 2010 and replaced two former stations: Bjørnsletta (located at a different location) and Lysakerelven. Both these stations were closed in 2006 while the Kolsås Line was being upgraded from a light rail to a rapid transit. Bjørnsletta is 8.2 kilometres (5.1 mi) from Stortinget.

== History ==
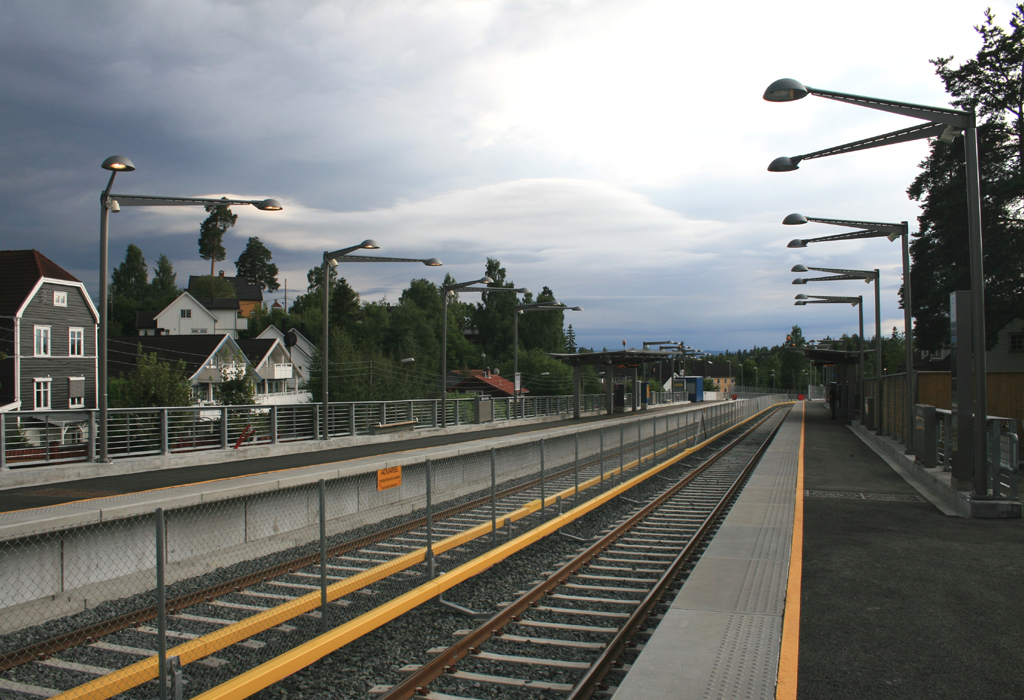
The station, looking westwards

The first station named Bjørnsletta opened with the connection from the Kolsås Line to the Røa Line on 15 June 1942. It was originally called Sletta, meaning "The Plain", but the ministry protested and felt that the name was too generic. Since bears had been spotted in the area in 1852, it was decided to name it Bjørnsletta, meaning "The Bear Plain". A lower secondary school named Bjørnsletta was opened in 1981, though that school is located closer to the Åsjordet Station.

In 2006, the Kolsås Line was closed for renovations. Although connected to the Oslo Metro, the line had been built as a light rail and still had overhead wires, level crossings, low platforms and lacked automatic train protection. The upgrade allowed the metro to replace the aging T1300 trains with the new MX3000, and have longer six-car trains.

The construction was managed by Kollektivtransportproduksjon, who also owns the station. After the closing of Lysakerelven, Bjørnsletta is the last station on the Kolsås Line in Oslo, with the next station, Jar, being located in Bærum. The official opening of the station took place on 17 August 2010 by Mayor Fabian Stang, and the station will remain the terminal station of Line 6 until December, when Jar is scheduled to open.

== Facilities ==
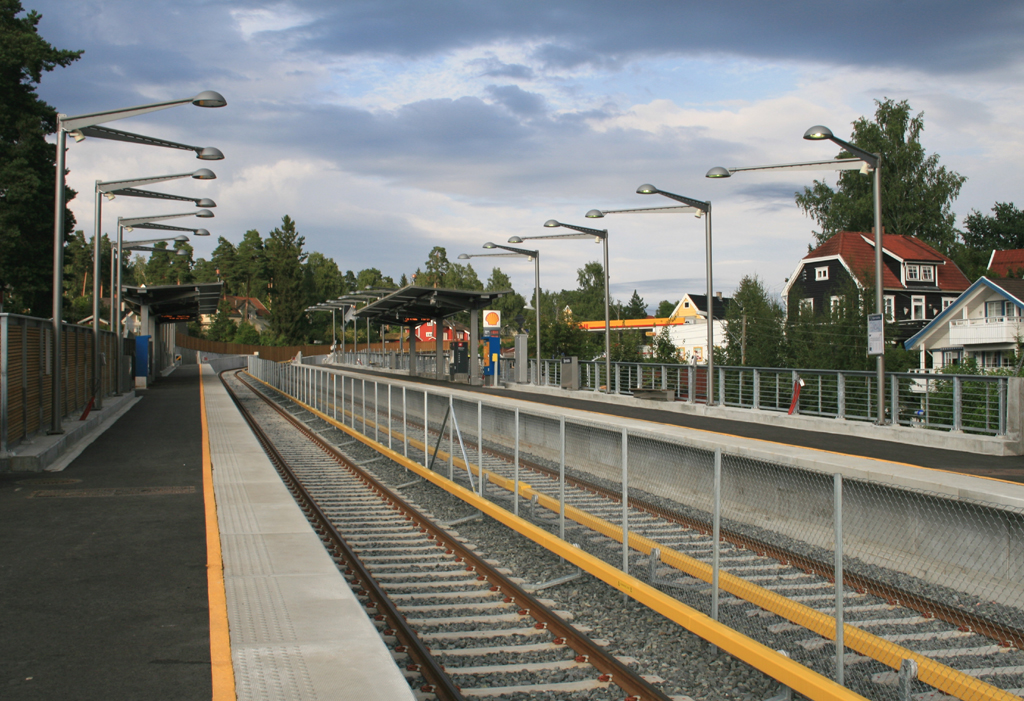
The station, looking eastwards

The station is located on the Kolsås Line, 8.2 kilometres (5.1 mi) from Stortinget, between the roads Bærumsveien and Sportsveien. The station is built along the old right-of-way, which limits the speeds along the line to 50 kilometres per hour (31 mph). The station has two side platforms and is long enough for six-car trains. The station has ticket machines and has universal access.

== Service ==
Bjørnsletta is served by Line 3 of the Oslo Metro, operated by Oslo T-banedrift on contract with Ruter. The rapid transit serves the station every 15 minutes, except in the late evening and on weekend mornings, when there is a 30-minute headway.
