= Wessels plass =

Square in Oslo, Norway

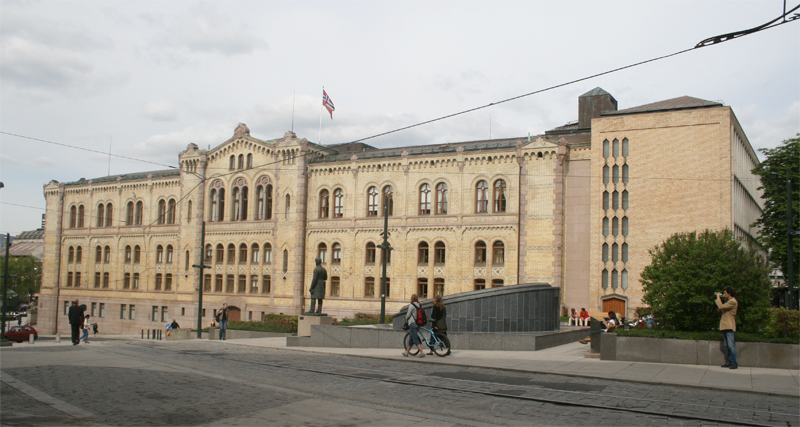
The Parliament of Norway Building with Wessels plass in the foreground.

Wessels plass ("Wessel's Square") is a square in Oslo, Norway, located south of the Parliament of Norway Building.

== History ==
Originally on the site was a knoll with a house surrounded by a garden. The Parliament of Norway Building was completed in 1866, ad in 1873 Oslo municipality bought the knoll. It was demolished around 1880 to give room for a park-like square. Named Stortingspladsen ('The Storting Square'), it was given its current name in 1891. It was named after Johan Herman Wessel, and a bust of him was raised here in 1891. A statue of Johan Sverdrup was raised in 1964. Under the square is a walking tunnel between the Parliament of Norway Building and office buildings across the street.

== Transport ==
Wessels plass had a light rail station on the Briskeby Line of the Oslo Tramway. It was served by lines 13 and 19, while it was active; westbound trams skipped the station. The square is also served by buses, and the Oslo Metro station Stortinget is not far away.
