= Lilleaker =

Neighbourhood in Oslo, Norway

Coordinates: 59°55′10″N 10°38′18″E

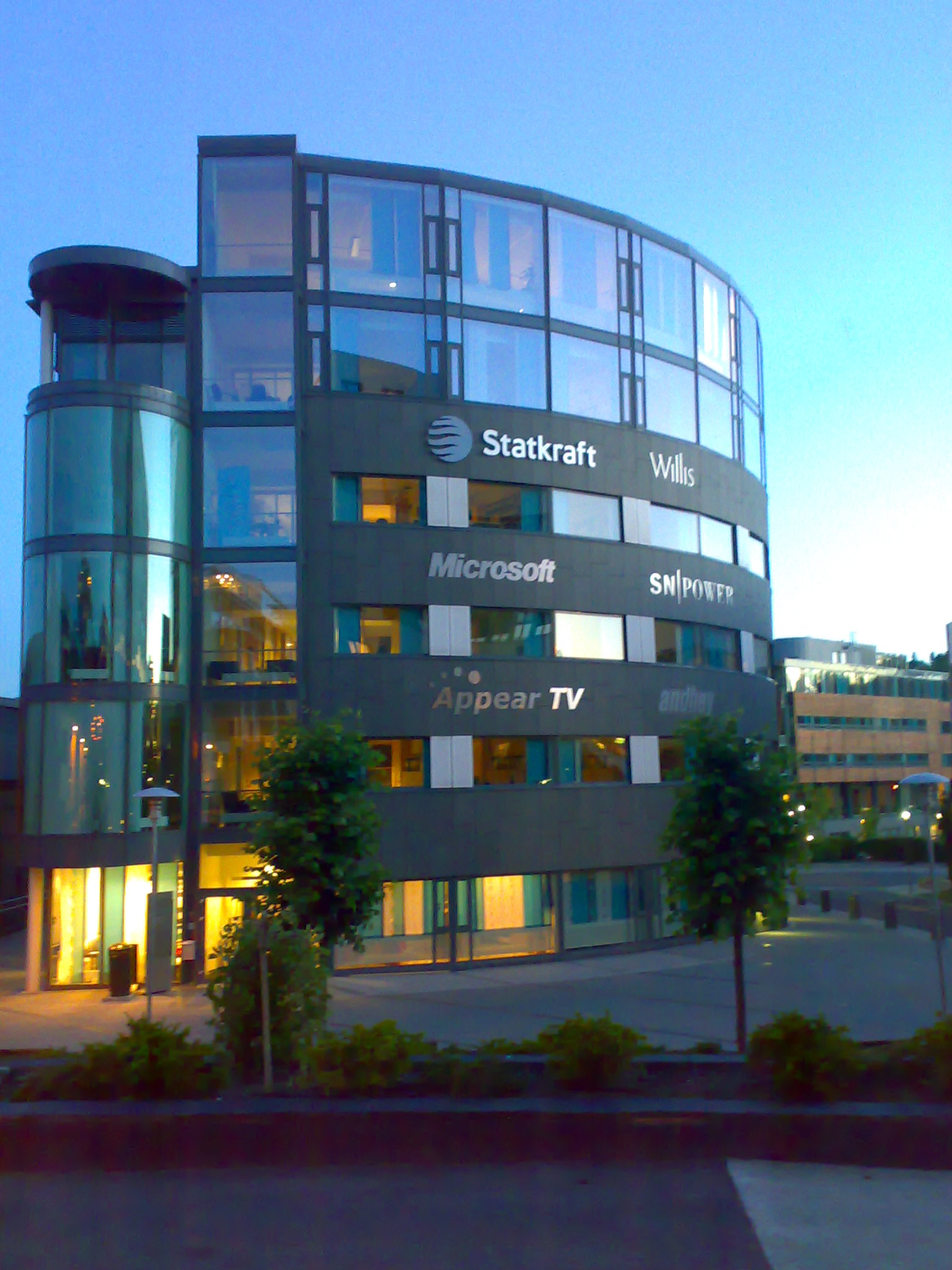
Office building at Lilleaker.

Lilleaker is a neighbourhood and industrial site in Ullern, Oslo, Norway. It is located east of the river Lysakerelva. The area is named after the Lilleaker farm.

Lilleaker served by the Lilleaker station of the Oslo Tramway, the southern part by Lysaker Station on the Drammen Line.

The local multi-sports clubs Lilleaker IF and Fagforeningenes IL Lilleaker (1927–1936) were absorbed and are now both a part of Ullern IF. The shopping center CC Vest is located in Lilleaker.
