= Ullernåsen station =

Oslo metro station

Ullernåsen
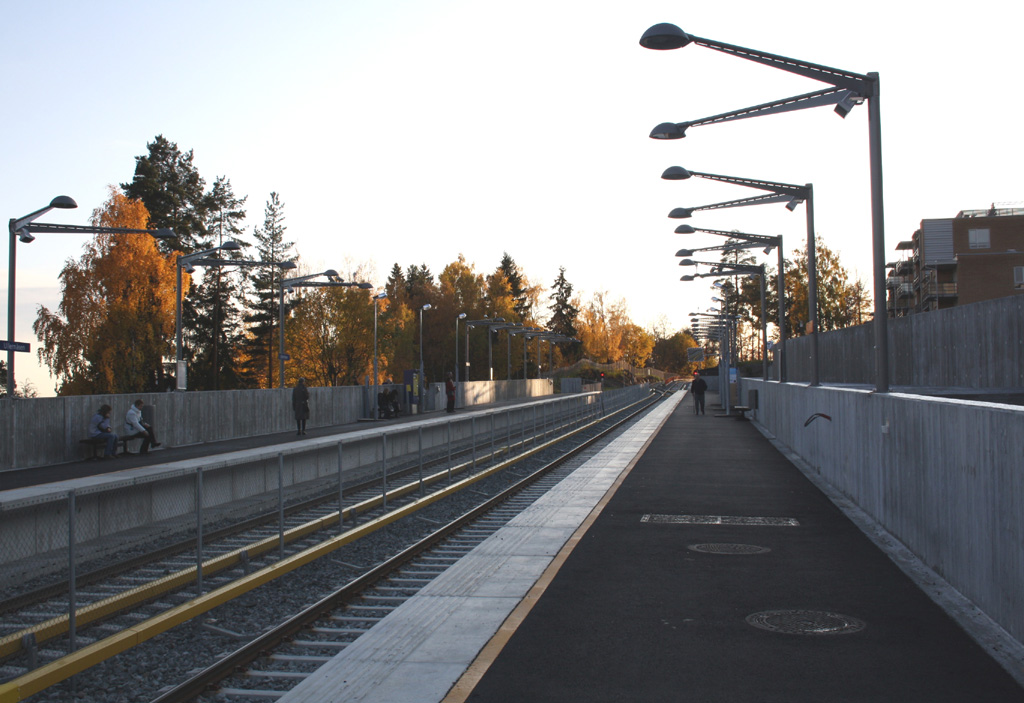

General information
- Location: Ullern, Oslo; Norway
- Coordinates: 59°55′52″N 10°39′21″E
- Elevation: 94.6 m (310 ft)
- Owner: Sporveien
- Operator: Sporveien T-banen
- Line: Kolsås Line
- Distance: 6.8 km (4.2 mi) from Stortinget

Construction
- Structure type: At-grade
- Accessible: Yes

Other information
- Fare zone: 1

History
- Opened: 15 June 1942; 84 years ago
- Rebuilt: 1 July 2006; 20 years ago to 18 August 2008; 18 years ago

Services
Preceding station	Oslo Metro	Following station
Åsjordet towards Kolsås	Line 3 Kolsås Line	Montebello towards Mortensrud
Location

Ullernåsen is an Oslo Metro station located at Ullern in Oslo, Norway. It is on Kolsås Line between Åsjordet and Montebello. It was opened on 15 June 1942. Since June 2006 it was temporarily closed while Kolsåsbanen was upgraded, and reopened on 18 August 2008.
