= CC Vest =

Shopping mall in Oslo, Norway

Coordinates: 59.9178°N 10.6362°E

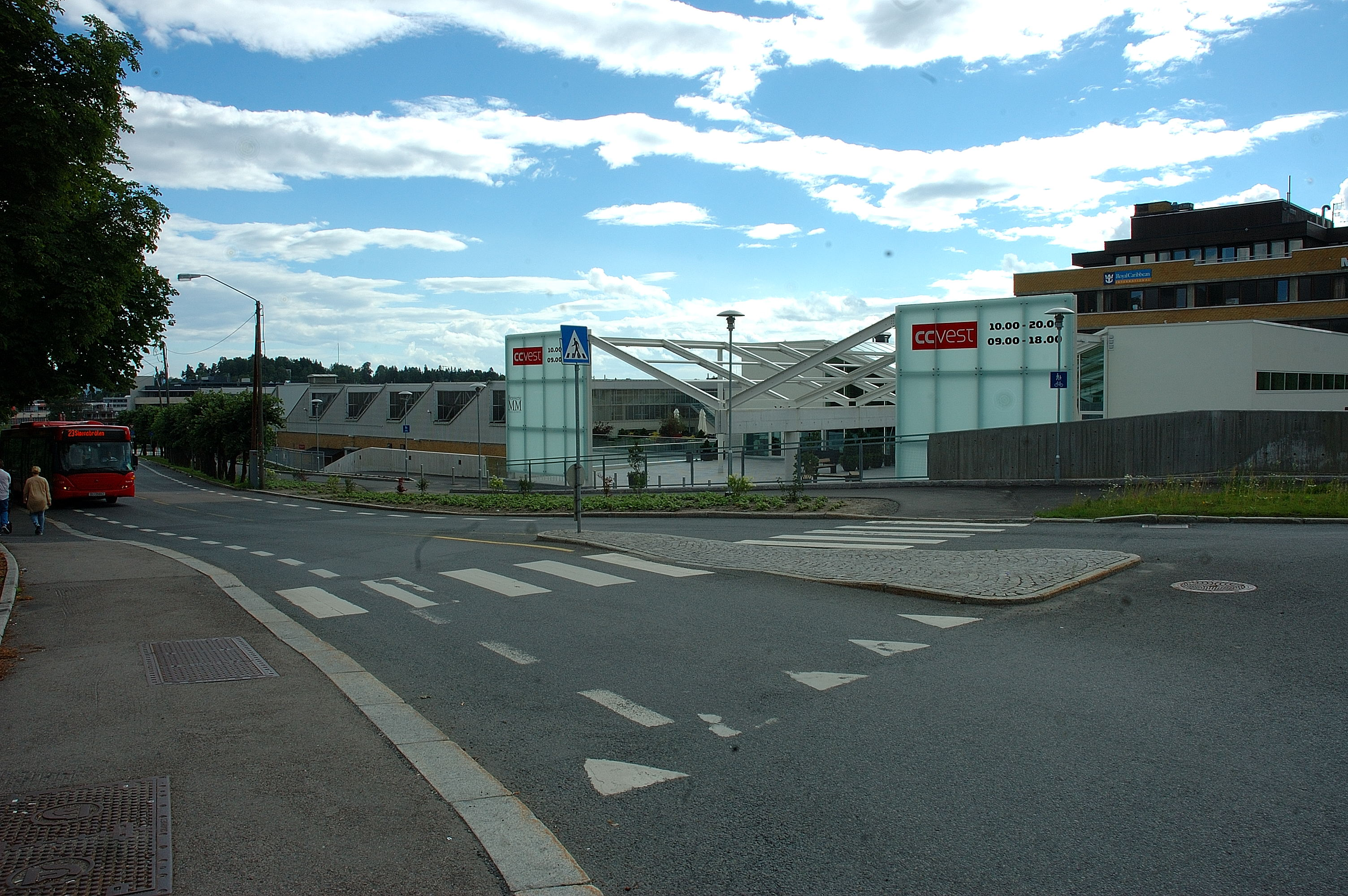
CC Vest

CC Vest is a Norwegian shopping centre in Lilleaker, Oslo. It has 78 outlets, and mainly serves western Oslo as well as eastern Bærum.

It was opened in 1989. The localities were previously used for industrial production by the company O. Mustad & Son, who by the 1980s wanted to cease this activity. The mall went through expansions in 1990, 1991, 2000 and 2004.
