= Montebello, Norway =

Neighborhood in Ullern, Oslo, Norway

Coordinates: 59.936°N 10.663°E

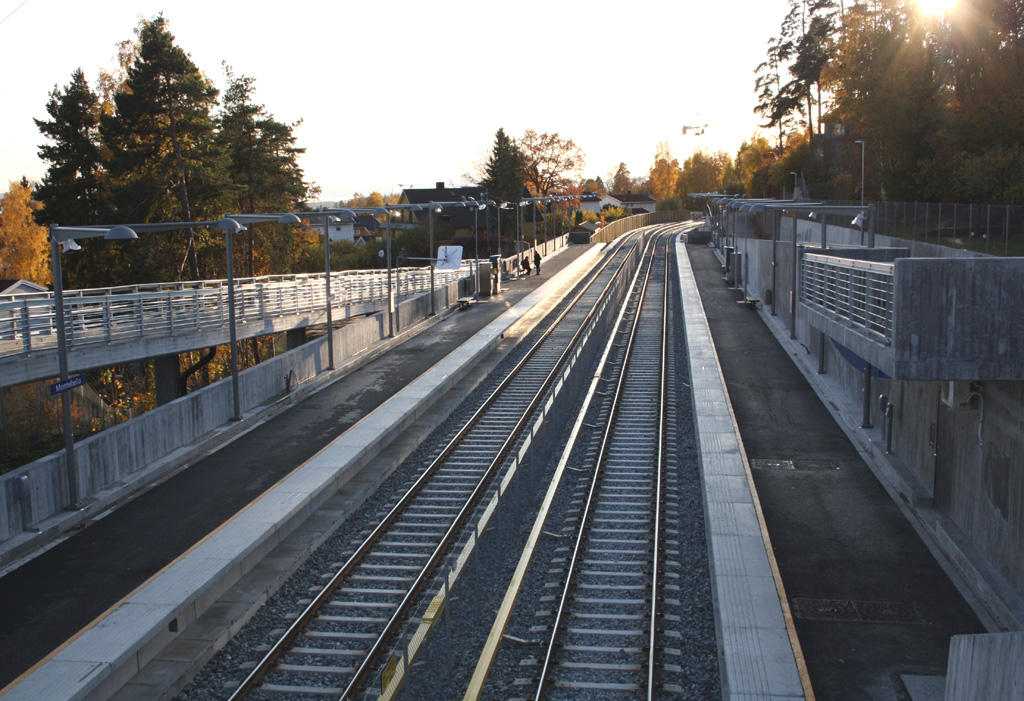
Montebello station

Montebello is a neighborhood in the borough of Ullern in Oslo, Norway.
