= Åsjordet station =

Oslo metro station

Åsjordet
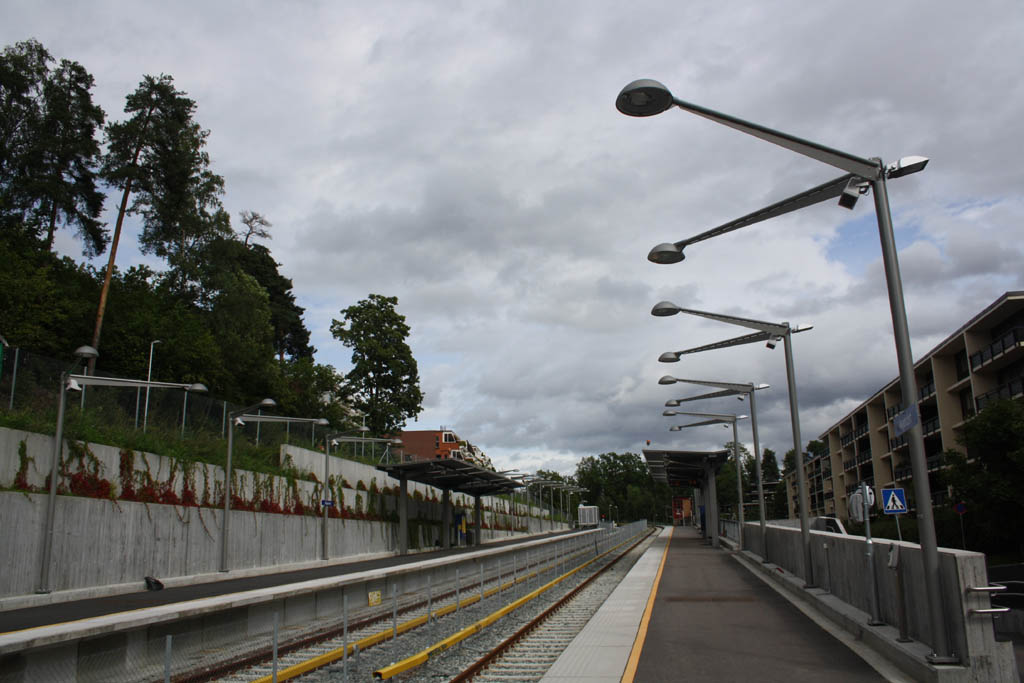

General information
- Location: Ullern, Oslo; Norway
- Coordinates: 59°55′43″N 10°38′48″E
- Owner: Sporveien
- Operator: Sporveien T-banen
- Line: Kolsåsbanen
- Distance: 7.4 km (4.6 mi) from Stortinget
- Tracks: 2

Construction
- Structure type: At-grade
- Accessible: Yes

Other information
- Fare zone: 1

History
- Opened: 15 June 1942; 84 years ago
- Rebuilt: 1 July 2006; 20 years ago to 18 August 2008; 18 years ago

Services
Preceding station	Oslo Metro	Following station
Bjørnsletta towards Kolsås	Line 3 Kolsås Line	Ullernåsen towards Mortensrud
Location

Åsjordet is a station on the Kolsås Line and Line 3 on the Oslo Metro system. It is located between Ullernåsen and Bjørnsletta, 7.4 kilometers (4.6 mi) from Stortinget. The station was opened on 15 June 1942 when the line from Røabanen to Jar was completed.

Along with most of the line, Åsjordet was closed for upgrades from 1 July 2006. The station reopened on 18 August 2008 after an upgrade that included, among other things, longer platforms which can accommodate trains with up to six cars like most of the subway system.

The area around Åsjordet is mainly residential, but some offices and other commercial buildings are also located in the area.
