= Fornebu Line =

Rail line in Fornebu, Bærum, Norway

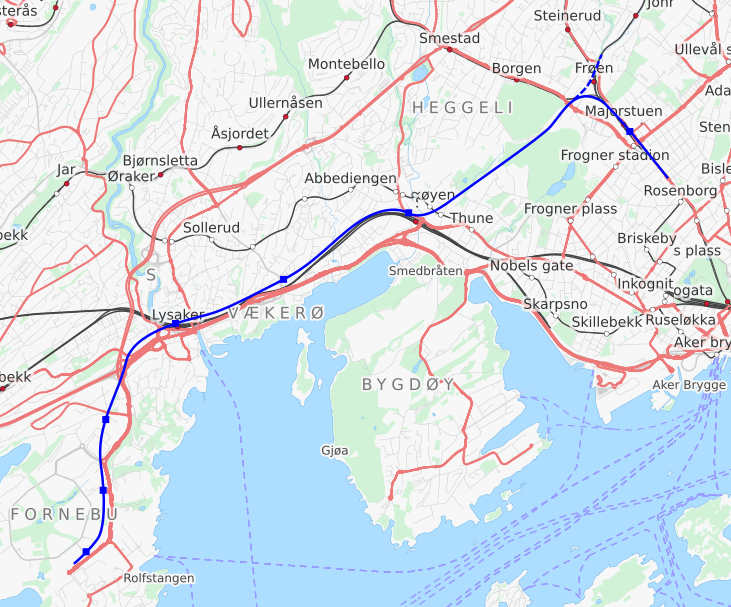
- Proposed route of the metro alternative

Overview
- Native name: Fornebubanen
- Status: Under construction
- Termini: Majorstuen; Fornebu

Service
- Type: Rapid transit
- System: Oslo Metro
- Rolling stock: MX3000

Technical
- Line length: 8.15 km (5.06 mi)
- Number of tracks: Double
- Track gauge: 1,435 mm (4 ft 8 1/2 in) standard gauge
- Electrification: 750 V DC third rail
- Operating speed: 70 km/h (43 mph)

The Fornebu Line (Norwegian: Fornebubanen) is an under-construction metro line forming a fully underground extension of the Oslo Metro between Majorstuen in Oslo and Fornebu in Bærum, Norway. The line is being built as part of the existing metro network and will connect to the metro's Common Tunnel at Majorstuen.

It will be about 7.7 kilometers (4.8 mi) long, running entirely in tunnel, and will have six new underground stations at Skøyen, Vækerø, Lysaker, Unity Arena, Flytårnet and Fornebu Senter, with a new depot at Fornebu.

Construction started on 11 December 2020, and the line is currently planned to open in 2029, after an earlier target of 2027 was postponed. The project is funded by the state, Oslo and Bærum municipalities and toll-road revenues, and recent estimates put the investment cost at a little over NOK 23 billion in 2021 price level.

== History ==
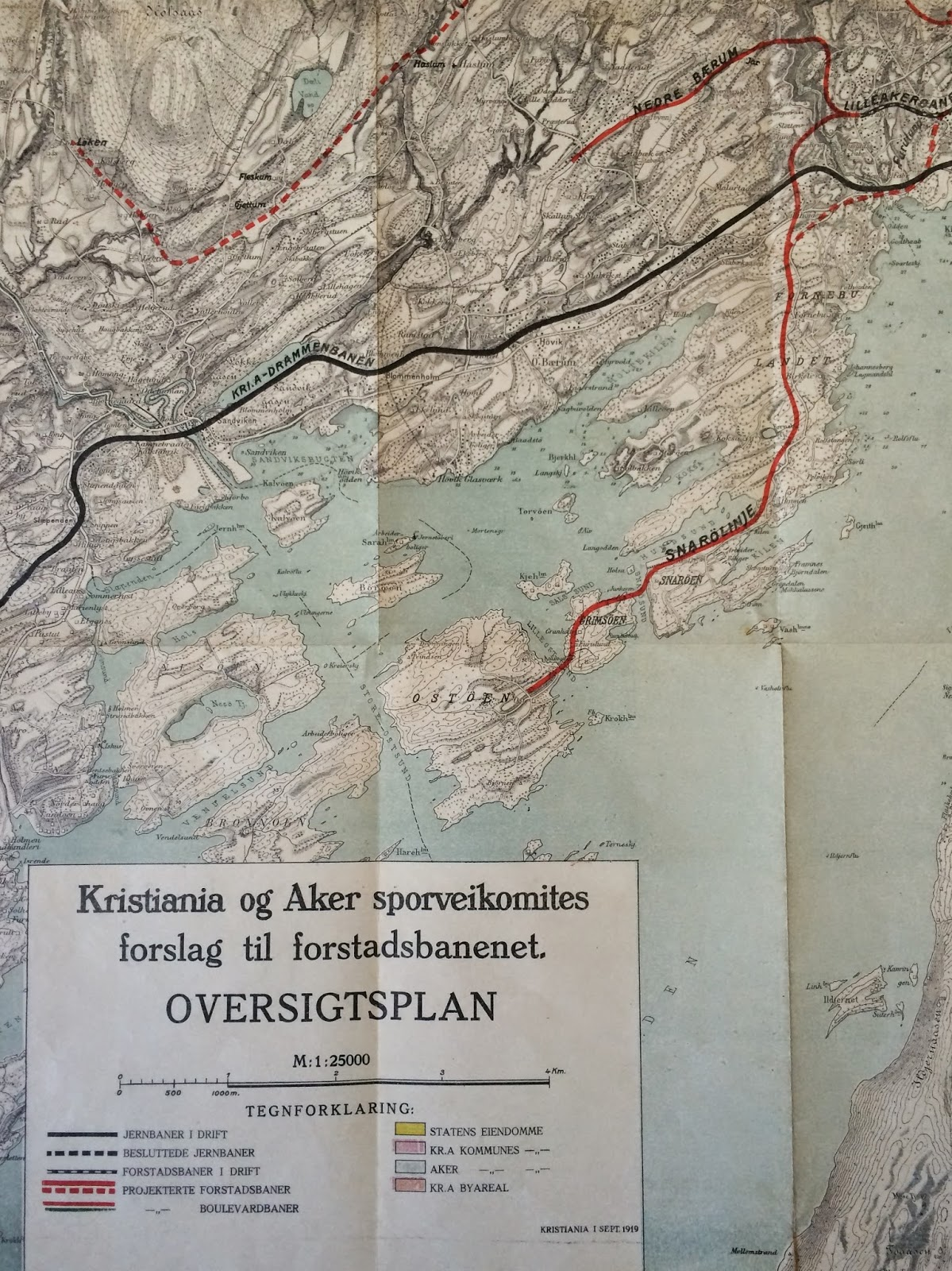
1919 proposal for a suburban light rail through Fornebu

The first proposals for a line to Fornebu arose as part of a 1917 competition issued by Christiana (later Oslo) and Aker Municipality to plan a new rail transport plan for the capital area. The winning design, made by Jørgen Barth, included a series of suburban lines. One of these was a branch from the Lilleaker Line past Lysaker, through Fornebu and onwards to Snarøya and Ostøya. At the time Fornebu was a largely unpopulated area, while there was a small population at Snarøya. Fornebu and Snarøya received a coach service in 1921. During the 1930s, the water aerodrome Gressholmen Airport became insufficient to meet Oslo's aviation needs, and it was decided that Fornebu would become the site of an airport. Oslo Airport, Fornebu opened on 1 June 1939.

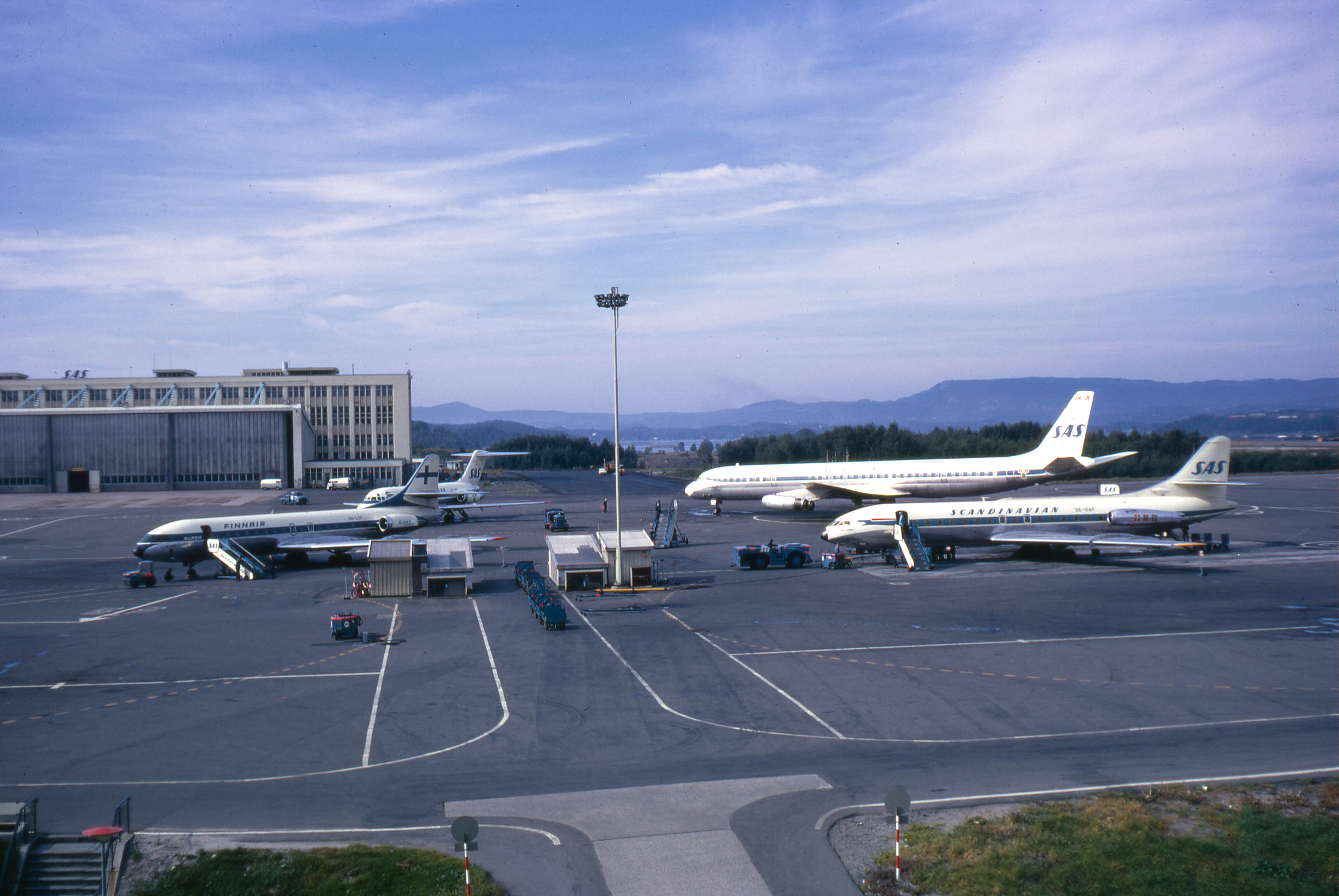
Finnair and Scandinavian Airlines aircraft at Oslo Airport, Fornebu in 1971, including two Sud Aviation Caravelles, a Douglas DC-9 and a Douglas DC-8

Transit to the airport was organized through a series of concessions which were issued to individual bus companies. From 1975, local buses were coordinated through Stor-Oslo Lokaltrafikk. Airport coach services to the city center were on the other hand granted to the largest airlines, Braathens SAFE and Scandinavian Airlines System (SAS). They operated each their coach service from two separate locations downtown. Various improvements to this system were proposed, including check-in in the city center. The coach and bus services were generally regarded as little attractive and forty percent of passengers at the airport used taxis. Fornebu was at the time still considered an option for a future main airport for Eastern Norway and there were therefore proposal to build an airport rail link.

Meanwhile, there was a political debate regarding the site of a new airport. Fornebu was one alternative. However, it only had a single runway, which was too small to serve intercontinental flights. It would therefore have to serve in tandem with Oslo Airport, Gardermoen. Other proposals were placing the airport at Hurum, Ås and Hobøl, or building a new airport at Gardermoen. The Norwegian State Railways developed a series of plans for the various airport locations, including the Hurum Line, the Gardermoen Line—which was ultimately built—and branches of the Østfold Line to Hobøl and Ås. The ground transport system was a major part of the considerations and proposals were made both for motorway and railway access to all the alternatives. As part of its 1986 proposal NSB also launched the concept of a people mover to the airport.

Construction of the airport was to be carried out by a separate limited company owned by the Civil Aviation Administration. Hence the airport was financed using state grants which would be repaid. A similar model was used for roads and railways, in which a separate subsidiary of NSB would be set up to build new railway lines. Parliament voted on 8 June 1988 in favor of building a new airport at Hurum. A series of weather surveys were then published which showed unfavorable conditions and the matter was again brought up for political consideration. A final decision to build a new airport at Gardermoen was thus taken on 8 October 1992 and subsequently closing Fornebu.

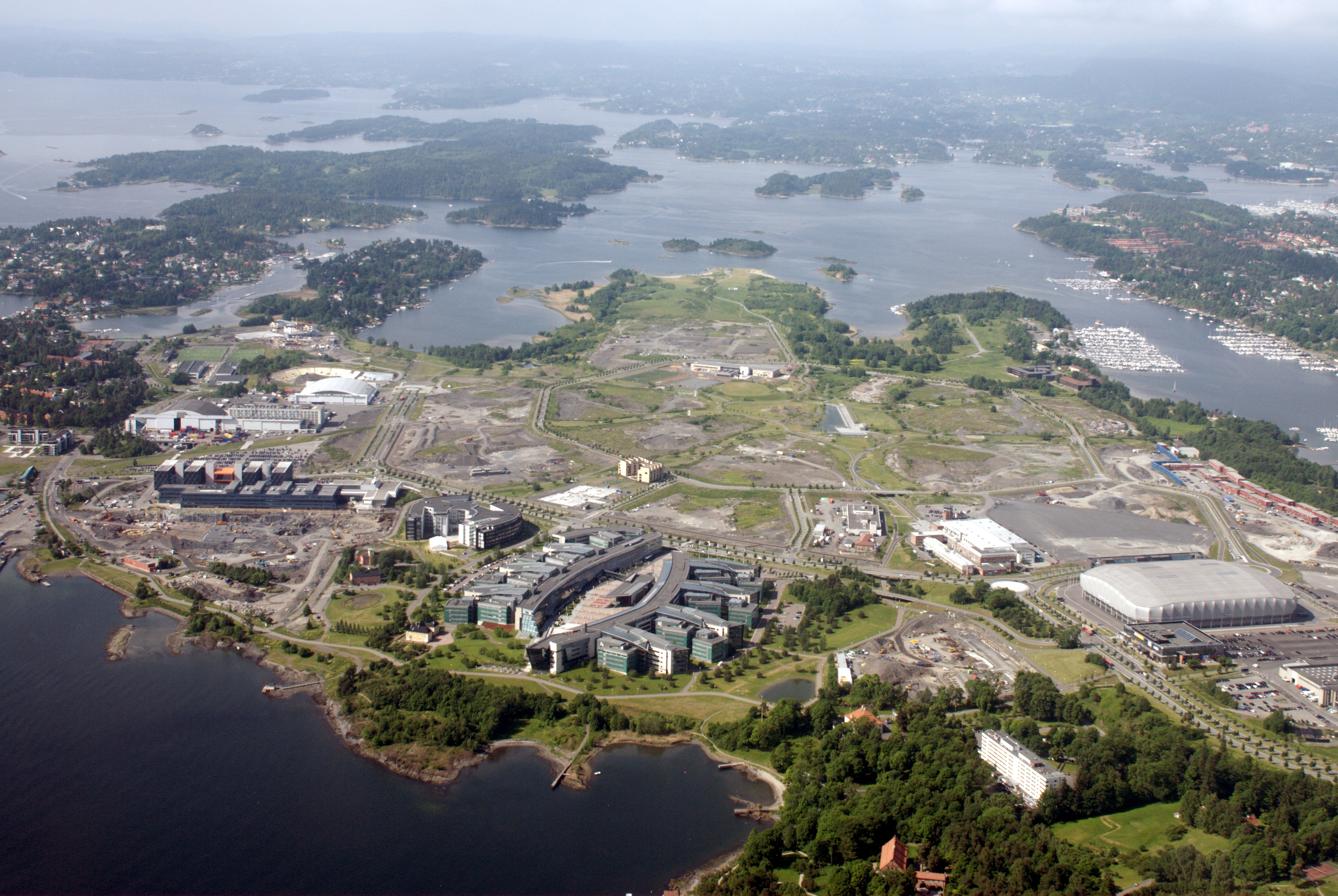
Aerial view of the peninsula

Lysaker Station was the closest railway station to Oslo Airport, Fornebu. From 27 May 1990, SAS and NSB started a cooperation to better the connection between rail and airline services. The project included the station being branded as Lysaker/Fornebu and dedicated shuttle buses running from the station to the airport terminal. NSB changed their scheduled so all InterCity Express and long-distance trains on the Drammen Line started stopping at Lysaker. Oslo Sporveier and the Norwegian National Rail Administration launched a proposal for a tram-train service in 1997, largely inspired by the Karlsruhe model. The last plane departed from Fornebu on 7 October 1998.

Work on planning the use of Fornebu after the airport was closed started in the early 1990s. The degree of how dense the peninsula was to be built was a source of controversy. Initial plans called for the establishment of a suburban area with 0.1 hectares (0.25 acres) lots and single dwellings. Ownership of the airport land was held by the government through Statsbygg and Oslo Municipality. Both a 1992 and a 1997 report concluded that it would benefit society the most if Fornebu was redeveloped as a residential area, with as many as 14,000 residences being quoted as a suitable number. However, this was later shifted towards more commercial and less residential space. In December 1999, the land-owners committed to contributing 200 million kroner towards a rail link, which was increased to 500 million in January 2000. Bærum Municipal Council approved the zoning plan for Fornebu in April 2000, which called for 5,000 residences and 15,000 jobs. This issue was appealed by Statsbygg, who demanded an increase in utilization. The Ministry of the Environment concluded in September that the number of residences be increased to 6,000. The latter sold its properties to Fornebu Boligspar in 2001, the same year as Statsbygg sold its properties to a series of investors.

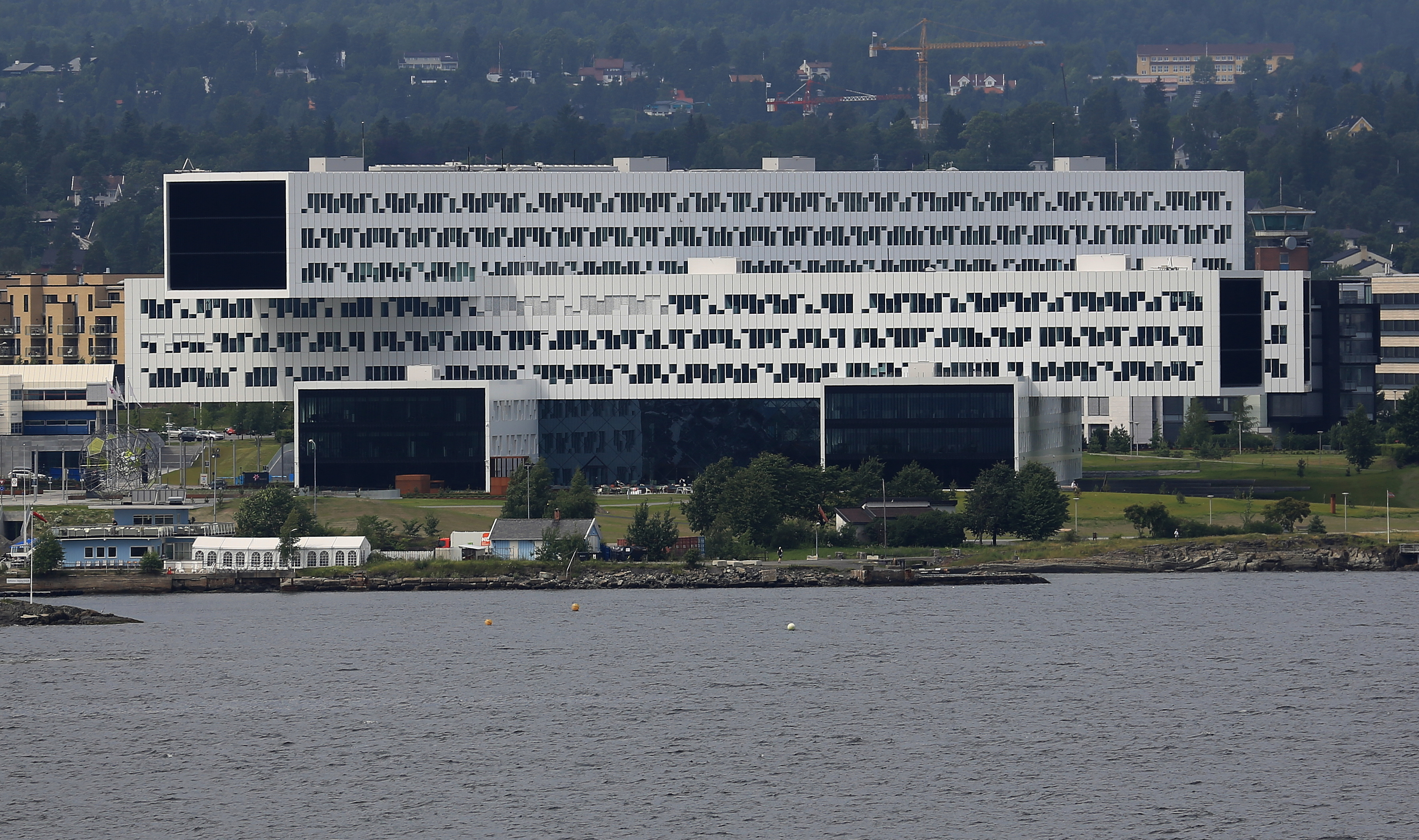
Equinor is one of several large companies to have built major office complexes at Fornebu

The first report regarding a rail transit system to the redeveloped Fornebu was published in April 2001, published by the Norwegian Public Roads Administration and the National Rail Administration. It investigated both bus, people mover, mainline railway and a tramway. The mainline railway alternative was based on the Asker Line being routed via Fornebu instead of running directly to Lysaker from Sandvika Station. By 2001 construction of the Asker Line was under way and soon this alternative was ruled out. The Ministry of Transport and Communications determined in August that building a line would be the responsibility of Akershus County Municipality, Bærum Municipality and, if applicable, Oslo Municipality. The following month a state grant of 600 million kroner was issued.

As an intermediate solution a bus service was established from Oslo to Fornebu. The number of buses have increased dramatically as new work places have opened, although there is no spare capacity on the buses. A further 2,500 in Fornebu opened in 2013 when Statoil opened its capital offices. The lack of transit was also a hindrance for the construction of housing, as this required the transit system to be in place. As of 2012 only 300 residences had been built at Fornebu.

Akershus County Municipality issued a report investigating tramway, people mover and bus rapid transit in March 2002. The county council voted in June to pursue a people mover, although it kept the possibility open for a connection onwards via tramway or metro. Further reports were issued in December 2002 and February 2003, and in April 2003 the county again approved a people mover, and asked Oslo Municipality to build a metro line to Lysaker. However, in the following three years there was a shift in the interest of building a people mover.

A new report was issued in 2006 and in May 2007 Akershus County Council voted in favor of building a tramway. A contributing factor was that a large array of expert bodies, including Oslo Sporveier, the Public Roads Administration, the Institute of Transport Economics and a series of consulting companies all recommended that a people mover was not suitable. The main downsides of a people mover gradually became evident for the county politicians. These included the inability to provide a direct service to Oslo and the system costs of have a fourth rail system, in addition to a metro, tramway and mainline railway. A particular concern was that very few people chose to use public transport if there are two or more transfers, which would be reality for many with a people mover.

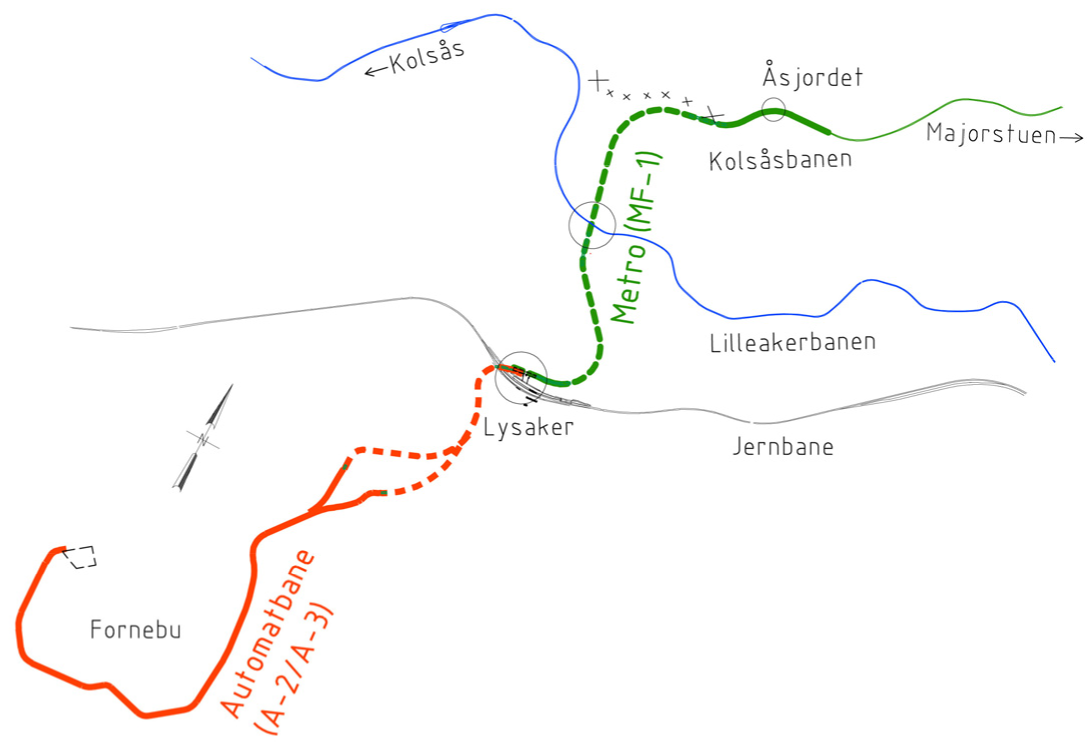
2004 map proposal of the Fornebu Line as a people mover and an extension of the metro from the Kolsås Line to Lysaker

Ruter attempted to base its right-of-way planning for the tramway along the regulated right-of-way of the people mover. However, this was not compatible as the premise for the people mover was that it would run elevated for its route, thus avoiding conflicts with road traffic. This issue made the tramway route unfeasible in the old route and Ruter therefore had to design a new route. Ruter was established as a common transit agency for Oslo and Akershus in May 2008, and took over the responsibility for planning. Ruter has since published a series of reports looking at the various modes and routes. It thereby concluded that a tramway would not be suitable and eventually landed on that a metro line exclusively in a tunnel via Skøyen to Majorstuen would be preferable. It cited the need for quick travel speeds to the city center, connection with the other transit systems and sufficient capacity to handle increased development at Fornebu. The metro alternative was approved of by Akershus County Council in December 2012 and Oslo Municipal Council in April 2013.

== Premise ==
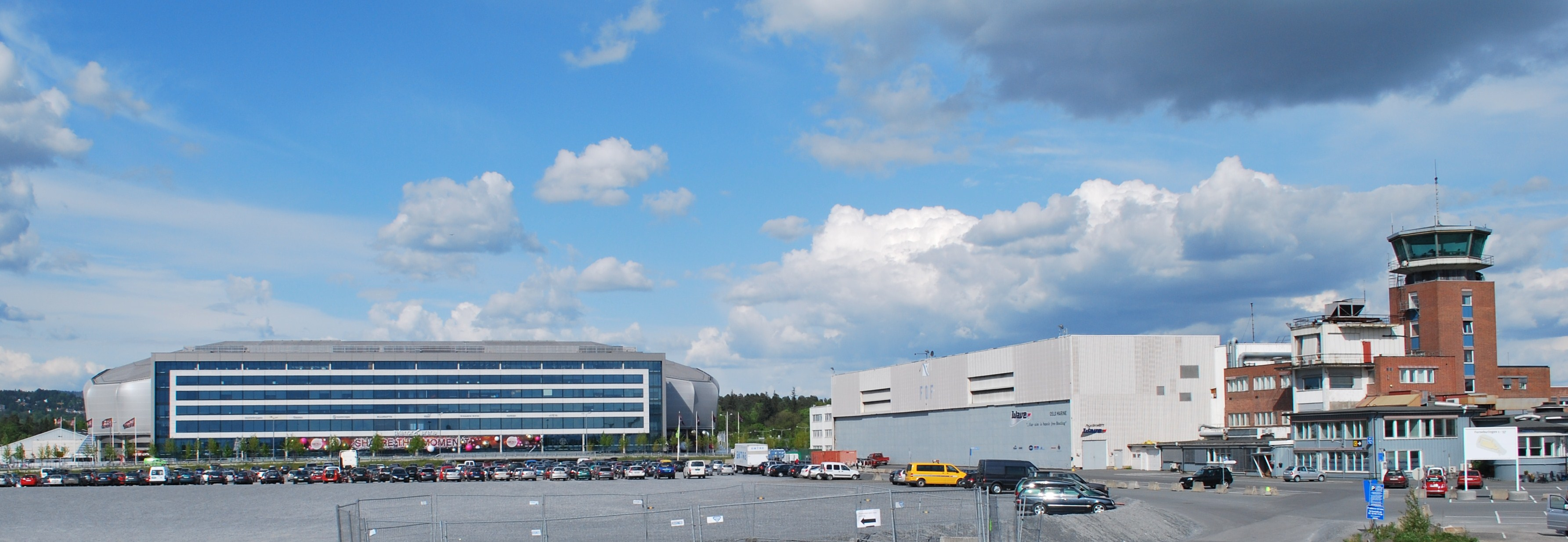
Telenor Arena and the old control tower is a recurring proposed site for a station

A planned 20,000 jobs and 6,000 residences are to be located at Fornebu. The transit system therefore has to be dimensioned to handle this number of commuters during the morning rush-hour. Further expansion to the plans could bring the total number of jobs to 25,000. The increase would have to be entirely based on transit, as there is no sufficient parking capacity for more people to drive. Demand for the various modes is more or less the same, at about 4,000 people per hour in both directions. However, given a long-term, high-growth development, only the metro alternative actually has sufficient capacity to handle the traffic estimates. The zoning plan of Fornebu is designed in such a way that only a limited amount of the area can be built before a rail transit is under construction.

Financing of the line will come from a variety of sources. There is funding in Oslo Package 3, an amalgamation of various national and local grants and toll fees, but this is insufficient to finance construction, even if it is delayed until 2027. Land-owners at Fornebu have committed 500 million 2000-kroner towards the construction of a rail transit. Ruter is considering if it should build the line as a public–private partnership. An alternative way to generate additional funding is that the land-owners pay for part of the infrastructure in exchange for a change to the zoning allowing more dense construction. Since 2013 the Ministry of Transport and Communications has promised to fund half the investments, although it is uncertain if this funding could be released before 2018.

== Proposed modes and routes ==
=== Suburban line ===
The 1919 proposal for a light rail was based on the standard of the western suburban lines, which are today part of the metro. The Lilleaker Line was proposed linked to the Common Tunnel at Majorstuen Station and a branch from the Lilleaker Line was proposed built, with two alternative routings, either branching near Lilleaker Station or at Bestum Station, intersecting via a culvert with the Drammen Line near Lysaker and then continuing through Fornebu in the middle of the peninsula. It would cross Snarøysundet to Snarøen and over Lille Ostsund to Ostøen. Further extensions to Brønøen were also called for, but at a later date. The municipal committee saw the line not only as a possibility for serving local residents, but also to transport day tourists from the city to the seaside.

=== Commuter rail ===
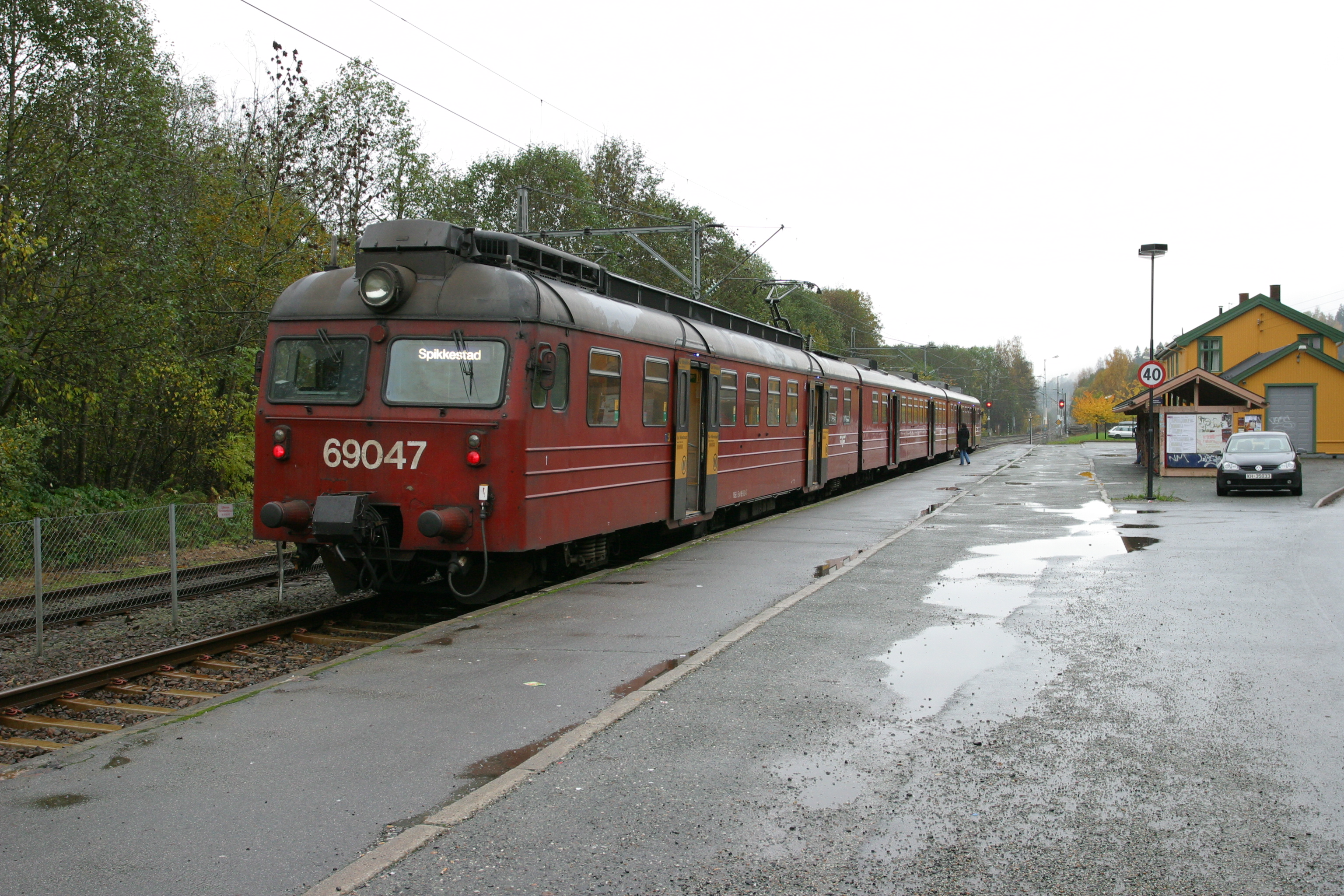
The mainline railway alternative called for the use of NSB Class 69 trains, such as this one at Heggedal Station

The 1981 proposal by the Institute of Transport Economics called for a mainline railway service to Fornebu as a single-track branch from the Drammen Line to the airport terminal. The intersection was proposed located 300 meters (980 ft) east of Lysaker Station, hinder trains from stopping at Lysaker. This was caused both by the geological conditions and road plans. The line would branch off and run under the Drammen Line and E18 in a tunnel. It would ascend between Snarøyveien and the fjord and continue to a station situated at the water aerodrome. The station would feature two tracks and would include an elevated walkway over to the terminal. Depending on the options for expanding Fornebu, the then main terminal was proposed rebuilt to an international terminal and a new domestic terminal was proposed built. This would have required the railway line to be extended and a second station be built. The line was estimated to cost 100 million kroner.

The line would have been built and operated by the Norwegian State Railways (NSB). As the Oslo Tunnel between Skøyen and Oslo Central Station is the bottle-neck of the system, the proposal called for existing routes of the Oslo Commuter Rail from the east which run through the tunnel and terminate at Skøyen council be extended to Fornebu. The proposal called for three every twenty minutes and a travel time of twelve minutes. The system would be able to take advantage of the airport being served against the rush-hour flows. Even when the investments in rail infrastructure were included, operating costs for a rail transit system were lower than that of a bus service. However, the lack of a train station in the terminal would add five minutes walking time. The proposal also examined various fast ferry services and found that the rail service would be between five and nine minutes faster than any coach or ferry option.

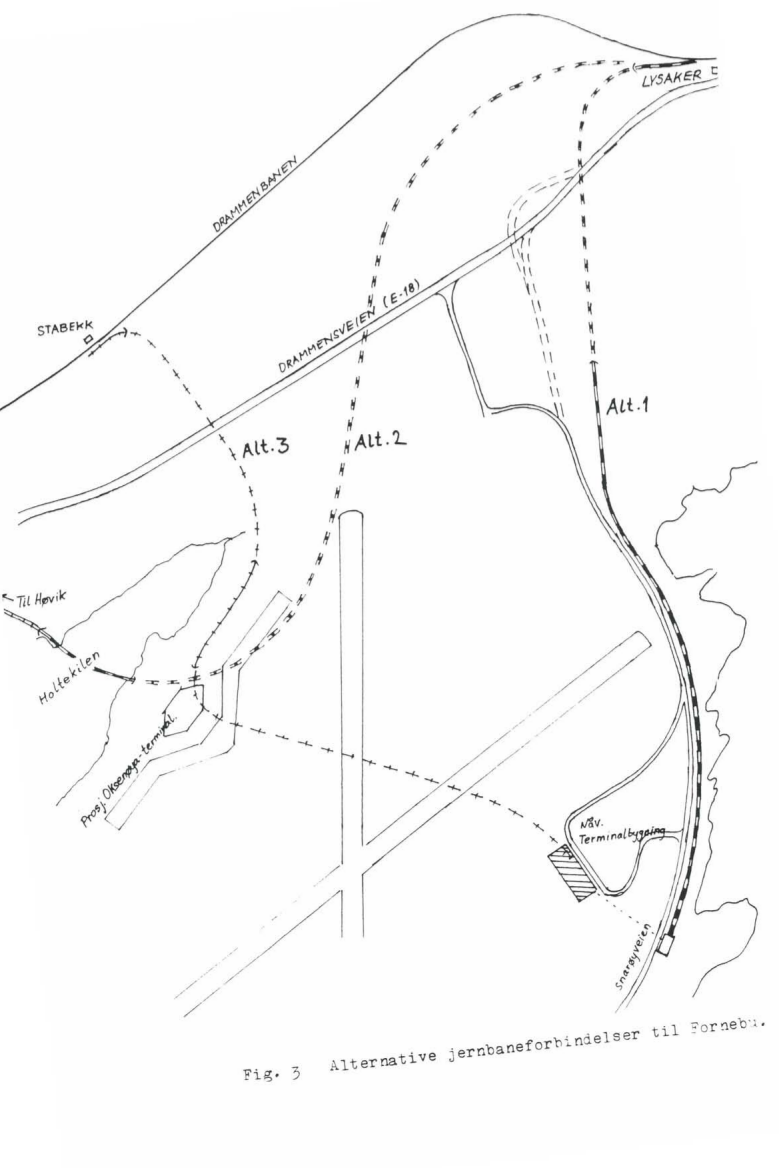
Map of NSB's two railway lines (alt. 1 is the branch and alt. 2 is the loop) and its people mover proposal (alt. 3)

The 1986 proposal by NSB considered the use of more modern rolling stock than the Class 69 trains being used. In addition to a branch proposal, it called for a loops from the Drammen Line between the stations of Stabekk and Høvik which would run down to Fornebu and stop at a station before continuing onwards to Lysaker. By then it was determined that keeping Oslo Airport, Fornebu would involve building a new, domestic terminal, situated at Oksenøen, 1,000 meters (3,300 ft) from the old terminal. The train station would be situated between these and a moving walkway built between the terminals and to the train station. NSB preferred the loop, as it allowed trains running along the Drammen Line to deviate via Fornebu and serve the airport. The branch line would require all traffic from the west to transfer at Lysaker. Costs were estimated at 160 million kroner, including a third track from Bestun Station to Stabekk.

NSB presumed that a similar operating procedure be carried out for a branch service. However, it proposed a different route which branched off west of Lysaker Station. By linking these with various lines to the east, this would allow direct services to the airport from the Østfold Line, the Gjøvik Line and the Trunk Line. For a loop service, NSB proposed that the airport be served with existing commuter trains running on the Drammen Line between Asker Station and Lillestrøm Station (today's line L1). The main advantage was that it would allow all regional and express trains, including those serving to the Bergen Line, the Sørlandet Line and the Vestfold Line, to call at the airport. Travel times were estimated at 12 minutes to Oslo Central Station, 18 minutes to Asker, and 25 and 33 minutes, respectively by commuter and express train, to Drammen Station. NSB estimated a twenty-five percent market share, giving an estimated 3,500 to 8,000 daily passengers, depending on how much airline traffic was allocated to Fornebu. A major advantage was that it would largely come as an additional product for existing services and would thus be economically favorable for NSB.

The final railway proposal was placed in a 2001 report. It looked at the possibility that the Asker Line would have been placed in a different route between Sandvika and Skøyen through Fornebu. Various routes were considered, some of which would stop and other which would not at Lysaker. Alternatively the branch proposal with two station was considered from Lysaker. THis would involve the construction of about 10.2 kilometers (6.3 mi) of new railway.

=== Automated people mover ===
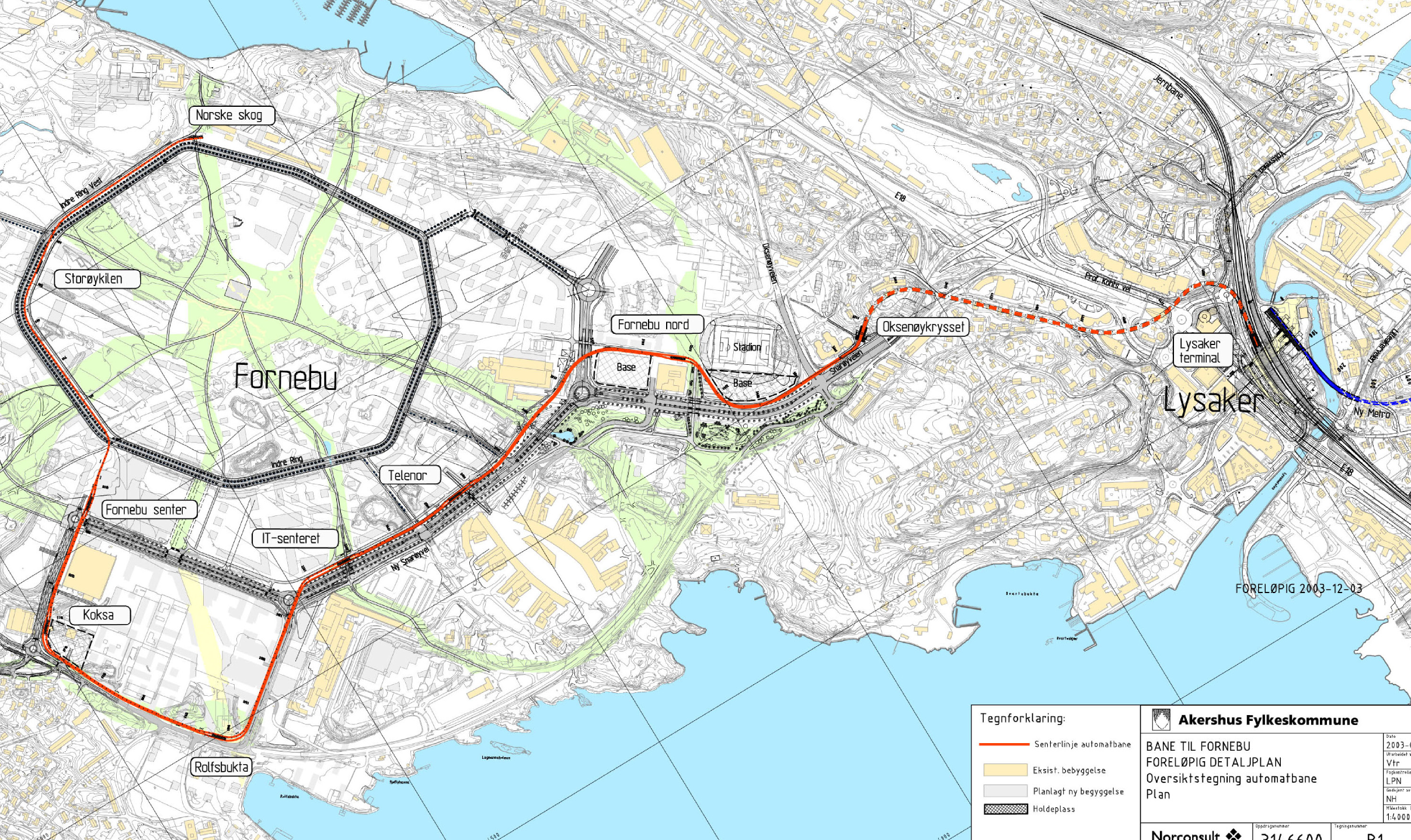
Detailed map of the proposed route of the people mover

The first proposal for a people mover was launched by NSB in 1986 and was centered around being a link for the airport. The line would have its start at Stabekk Station on the Drammen Line, where it would be located next to the railway platforms. NSB would schedule all services along the Drammen Line stop at Stabekk. The stations at the terminals would be built in the immediate vicinity of the check-ins. The line would have been 2.2 kilometers (1.4 mi) long and have two stations, one at each of the terminals. In such capacity it would double as a transit system between the terminals, which would be situated on each side of the runway. Travel time to Oslo Central Station was estimated at 15 minutes. A major advantage compared to the loop line was that the people mover would be able to serve both terminals, not just the new terminal.

The second alternative for a people mover arose with the closing of the airport. Various technologies were pursued, ranging from a light metro—essentially a low-capacity rapid transit—to monorails. No universal standards are available and the system would have to be custom-built by a manufacturer. The system would run elevated or in a tunnel from Lysaker to Oksenøykryset and from there as an elevated line. Akershus County Municipality opted for a monorail system, emphasizing the light design. Speeds would have been limited to 40 to 50 kilometers per hour (25 to 31 mph).

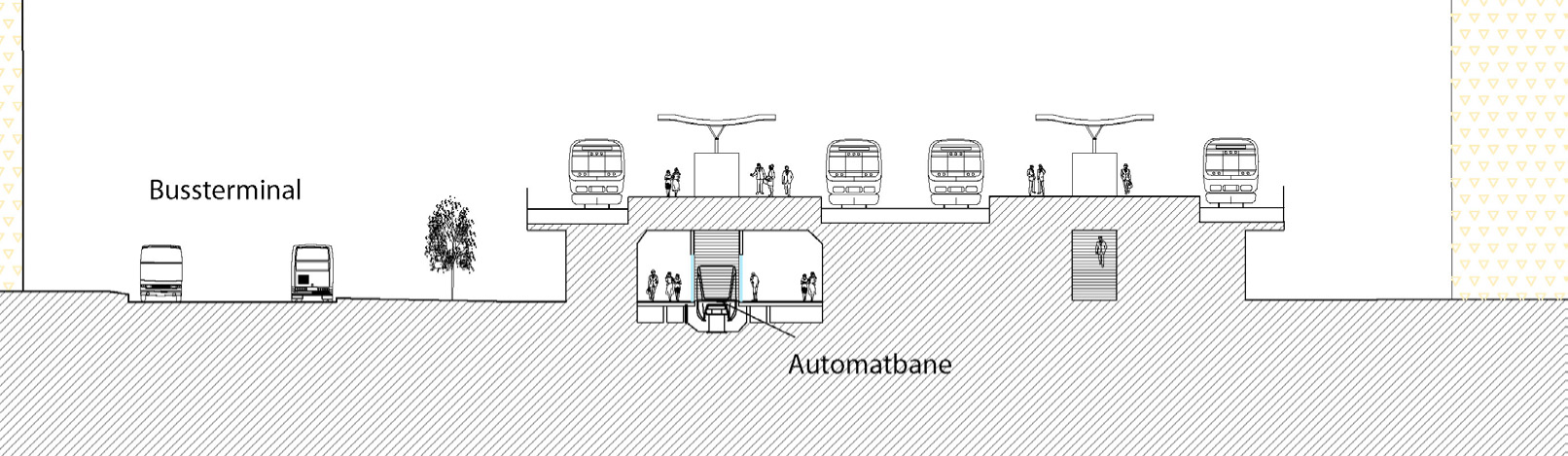
Crossection of Lysaker Station showing how the people mover could be integrated into the station

From Lysaker the line was proposed built as a double-track system to Fornebu Senter and onwards as a single-tracked system to Norske Skog. The system would require 32 hourly departures during rush-hour and 16 departures per hour the rest of the day. Eight of these would continue on the single-tracked section. Travel time from Lysaker to Norske Skog would have been 12.5 minutes, 10 minutes to Fornebu Senter and 5 minutes to Telenor. The line would serve ten stations.

The system could either be built in isolation, and rely on transfer to train at Lysaker, or be built in connection with a metro. The latter would result in an underground section through Lysaker and a common transfer between the three modes at Lysaker. The metro line was proposed as a branch of the Kolsås Line from Åsjordet Station and with an intersection and transfer to the Lilleaker Line at Lilleaker. Almost the entire section of metro would be built in a tunnel. at Lysaker a metro alternative would give transfer at the same platform between the two modes, while a non-metro alternative would give a people mover station below the train station. By linking up to five cars into a train, each departure could have a capacity of 175 people. This would allow for 5,600 passengers per hour. Initial reports regarded this as sufficient, but later reports found this to be insufficient. The system would require eleven trains.

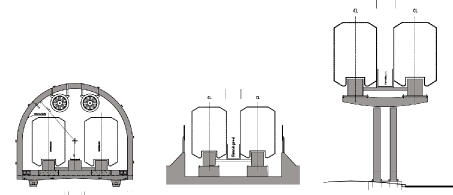
Illustration of crossections of people movers in tunnel, at-grade and elevated

During later planning phases the county also looked at the possibility for the line to be built in such a way that it at a later date could be converted to a tramway and connected to the Oslo Tramway. The alternative gave a large hike in the investment costs, while it provided no advantages during the initial operating phase. The structure's width and visual profile would increase and of these reasons the alternative was abandoned.

A major advantage with the people mover was that it would allow for a good geographical coverage of the peninsula and could be built to make all bus services superfluous. The plans required that Lysaker Station had an exceptionally good transit service with links in many directions so that further transfers would not be necessary. Investments were estimated at 1.5 billion kroner in 2011, lower than any of the alternative modes.

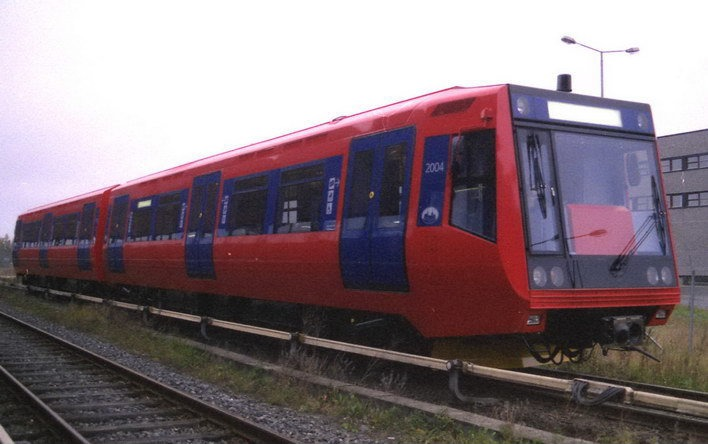
The tram-train model was based around the use of modified T2000 metro trains, which could both use overhead wires and third rails

=== Tram-train ===
The proposed tram-train route would run in a new tramway line from Fornebu to Lysaker. There it would connect to the Drammen Line from Lysaker Station to Skøyen Station. At the latter site it would instead connect to the Skøyen Line of the tramway via Bygdøy allé and run to the city center and Jernbanetorget. The line was proposed extended eastwards partially along the Trunk Line and partially along a new light rail route via Akershus University Hospital to Lillestrøm and Kjeller in Skedsmo. The line from Lysaker to Fornebu was estimated to cost 223 million krone, and a total cost of 334 million to reach the city center.

The service took its basis in the new T2000 trains which had been delivered for the Holmenkollen Line a few years earlier. These were built so that they could operate both along light rails with overhead wires at 600 volts and on the metro with a third rail 750 volt power supply. Connection to the mainline railway would require the system to also handle 15 kV 16.7 Hz AC. However, the system would only have to relate to standard gauge. The system posed a series of challenges. One was the difference in platform height and loading gauge. While the metro features a platform height of 105 centimeters (41 in), the railways used 57 and 70 centimeters (22 and 28 in) and the tramway 26 centimeters (10 in). Similarly, the vehicles have varying widths. This would mean that a tram-train would have to opt out of using existing platforms at all but one mode. The systems use varying standard top speeds and a tram-train would therefore have to have more power than a metro train to keep higher speeds to not slow other traffic on the mainline railway.

=== Tramway ===
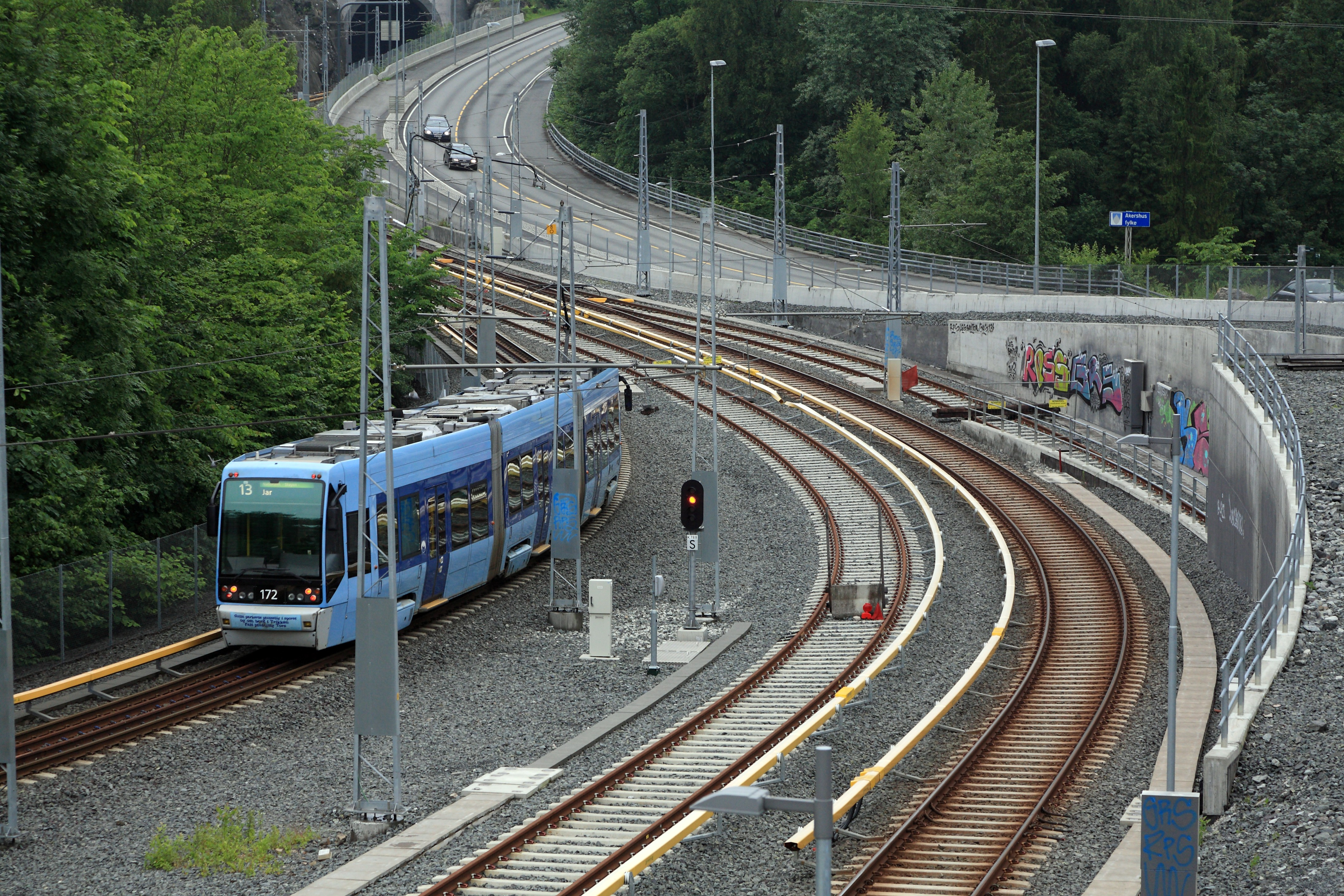
A SL95 unit of the Oslo Tramway on a new section of track of the Lilleaker Line at Øraker

Ruter's proposal for a tramway was based on two separate routes from the city center to Lysaker and one proposed route from Lysaker through Fornebu. From the city center the trams would run along the Skøyen Line, while others would run from Majorstuen to via the Frogner Line to Frogner plass and from there in a new line to Skøyen. From Skøyen there were two proposed routes to Lysaker. The one involved using the existing Lilleaker Line to Furulund Station, where the line would branch off. It would then run in a tunnel to Lysaker and onwards to Oksenøyveien. The alternative, which was named the Fjord Tramway, was proposed to run from the Skøyen, through a short tunnel under the E18 and along Bestumkilen. It would have an intermediate station at Vækerø and then continue in a tunnel to Lysaker and onwards to Oksenøyveien. It would be located in an underground station at Lysaker, blow the lot north of the station. The station would be located at 4 meters (13 ft) below mean sea level in bedrock. This allows it to be built without interrupting operations at Lysaker Station, without interfering with the structures on the lot above and giving sufficient depth to pass under Lysakerelva.

From Oksenøyveien, where it would feature a stop, the line would continue onwards to stations at Telenor Arena and the Telenor head office. It would run through a short tunnel to Rolfsbukta and then start turning around to in a circle to Koksa and terminate at Fornebu Senter. A future extension was proposed onwards to Storøykilen and Norske Skog's head office. The line from Fornebu Senter to Furulund would be 4.7 kilometers (2.9 mi), while an extension from Fornebu Senter to Norske Skog would be 1.0 kilometer (0.62 mi). Travel time from Fornebu Senter to Lysaker would be 8.5 minutes and from Fornebu Senter to Nationaltheatret 27.5 minutes. The line is proposed to be served by 24 trams per hour from Fornebu to Skøyen, of which 8 continue to the city center and onwards along an extended Sinsen Line to Tonsenhagen. In 2011 the costs of a tramway were estimated at 2.7 billion kroner.

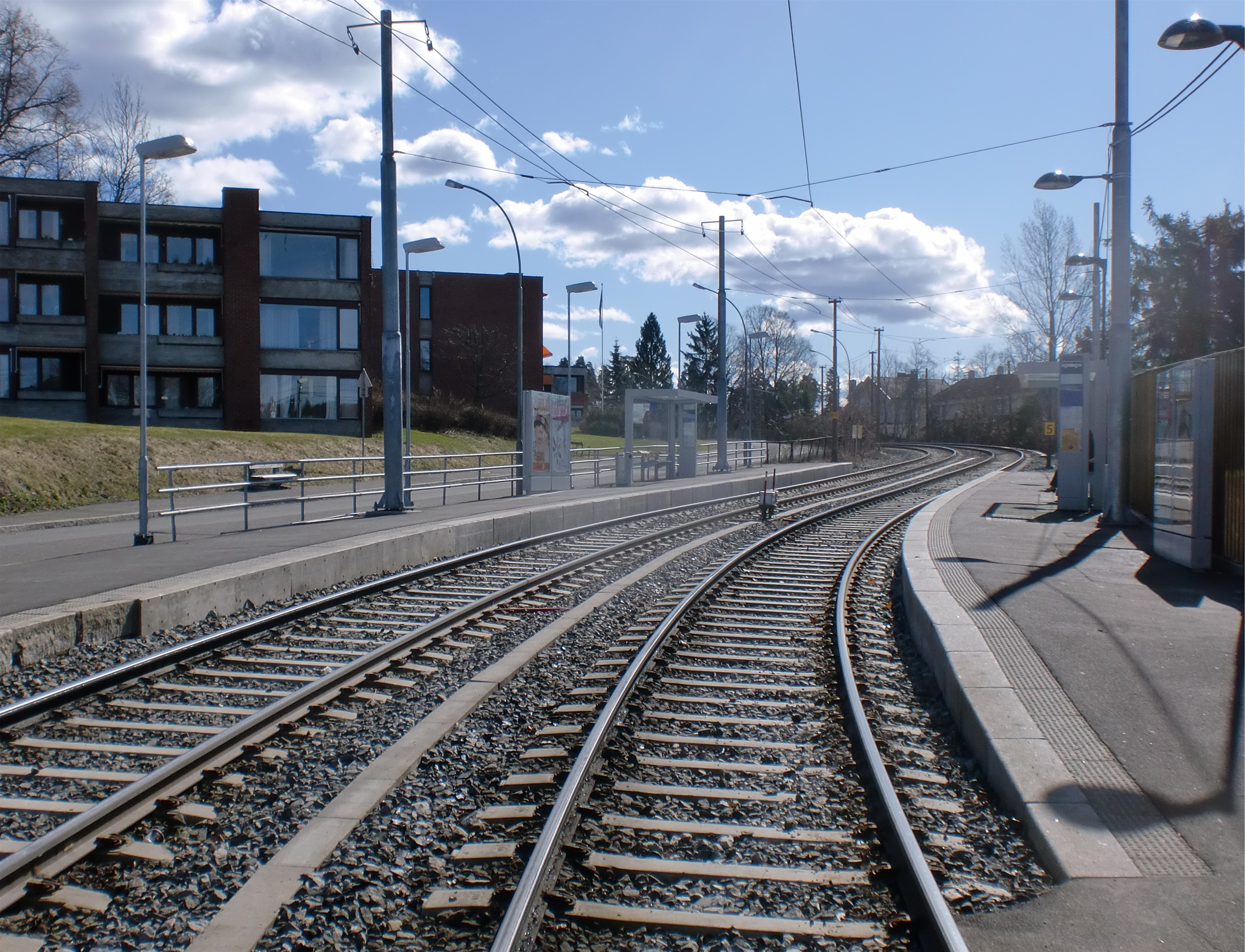
The tramway alternative could have been built as a branch of the Lilleaker Line

Ruter has also explored the concept for light rail based on the agency's long-term plan to upgrade the tram network to a system similar to a stadtbahn. It would run with conventional tram vehicles, connected in pairs and with a combined capacity of circa 360 passengers. In relation to its route, it was planned built at ground level with six station at Fornebu (Fornebu Senter, Koksa, Rolfsbukta, Telenor, Telenor Arena and Oksenøykryssset). From there it would run to Skøyen in a tunnel with intermediate stations at Lysaker and Vækerø. From Skøyen some services would run along existing tramways to the city center, while others would run in a tunnel to Majorstuen. Ruter estimated the cost of the light rail at 3.5 billion kroner in 2011. It would have 16 hourly departures to Skøyen, half of which would continue to Majorstuen and half of which would continue to the city center.

The tramway alternative has the easiest and fastest access, being located at street level. This encourages passengers which will take it between stops on Fornebu and travelers heading to Lysaker. However, the long travel time by tram to the city centers means that most travelers will switch to trains at Lysaker. Estimates show that in the long run the tramway alternative may not have sufficient capacity to handle all the traffic to Fornebu. The tramway is in the process of ordering new trams. One of the goals is that they can be a shelf ware. Should the Fornebu Line be built as a tramway, it would feature the only tunnels on the network. This would result in the trams having to be built in a higher fire grade, resulting in significantly higher costs for all trams for the network. Alternatively special trams for the Fornebu Line would have to be built, eliminating possibility of economy of scale.

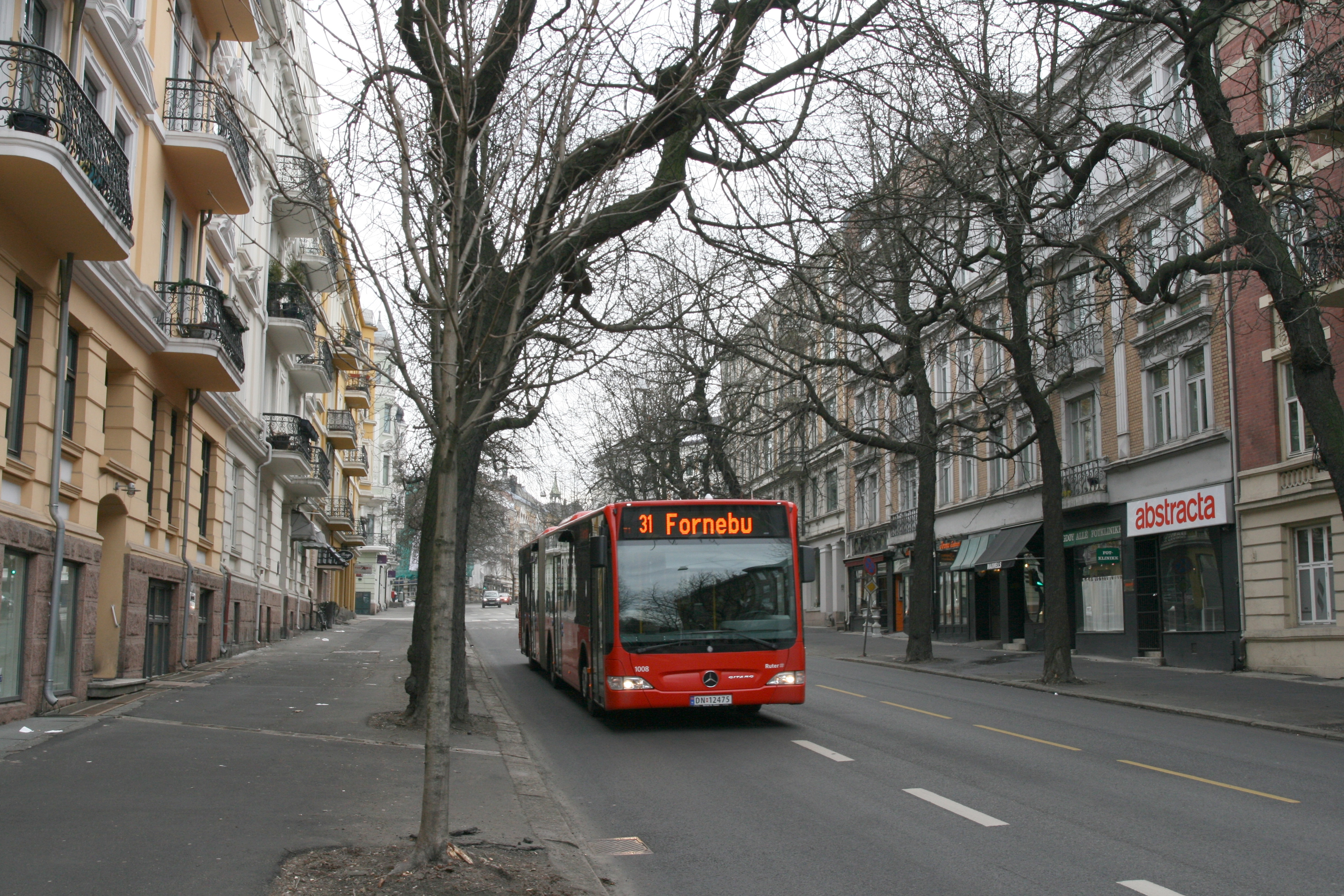
Mercedes-Benz Citaro articulated bus on Line 31 to Fornebu in Bygdøy allé

=== Bus rapid transit ===
Buses make up the current public transport service to Fornebu, and as of 2017, Ruter operates up to 50 buses per hour to the peninsula. They partially run along reserved bus lanes. However, there is not sufficient capacity at street level to handle more buses at the stops. The Norwegian Public Roads Administration is considering alternatives for handling increases buses, including that of building a bus terminal. Construction of a rail transit system would make further upgrades superfluous.

Termed "superbus", Ruter has investigated the possibilities of building a bus rapid transit. From the city center the route would follow the current bus route along Bygdøy allé for street access, while other buses would run on the motorway to Oslo Bus Terminal. It would follow the same right-of-way as a tramway would from Skøyen to Fornebu and would run either in a tunnel or along the fjord from Lysaker to Skøyen. It would serve Lysaker via an underground terminal and continue in a tunnel to Øksenøykrysset. It would continue through Fornebu halting at six stops. However, Ruter was concerned that it would be difficult to create an efficient system without large-scale bus lane conversion in the city center. Investments were estimated at 1.7 billion kroner in 2011.

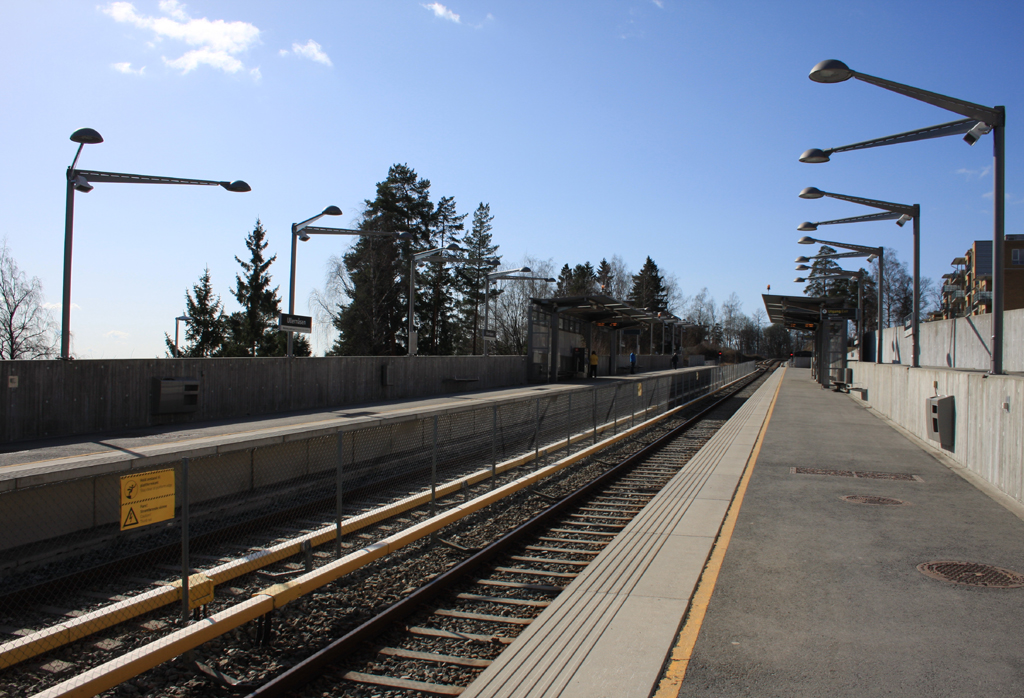
Ullernåsen was previously proposed as the site for the Fornebu Line to branch off from the Kolsås Line.

=== Metro ===
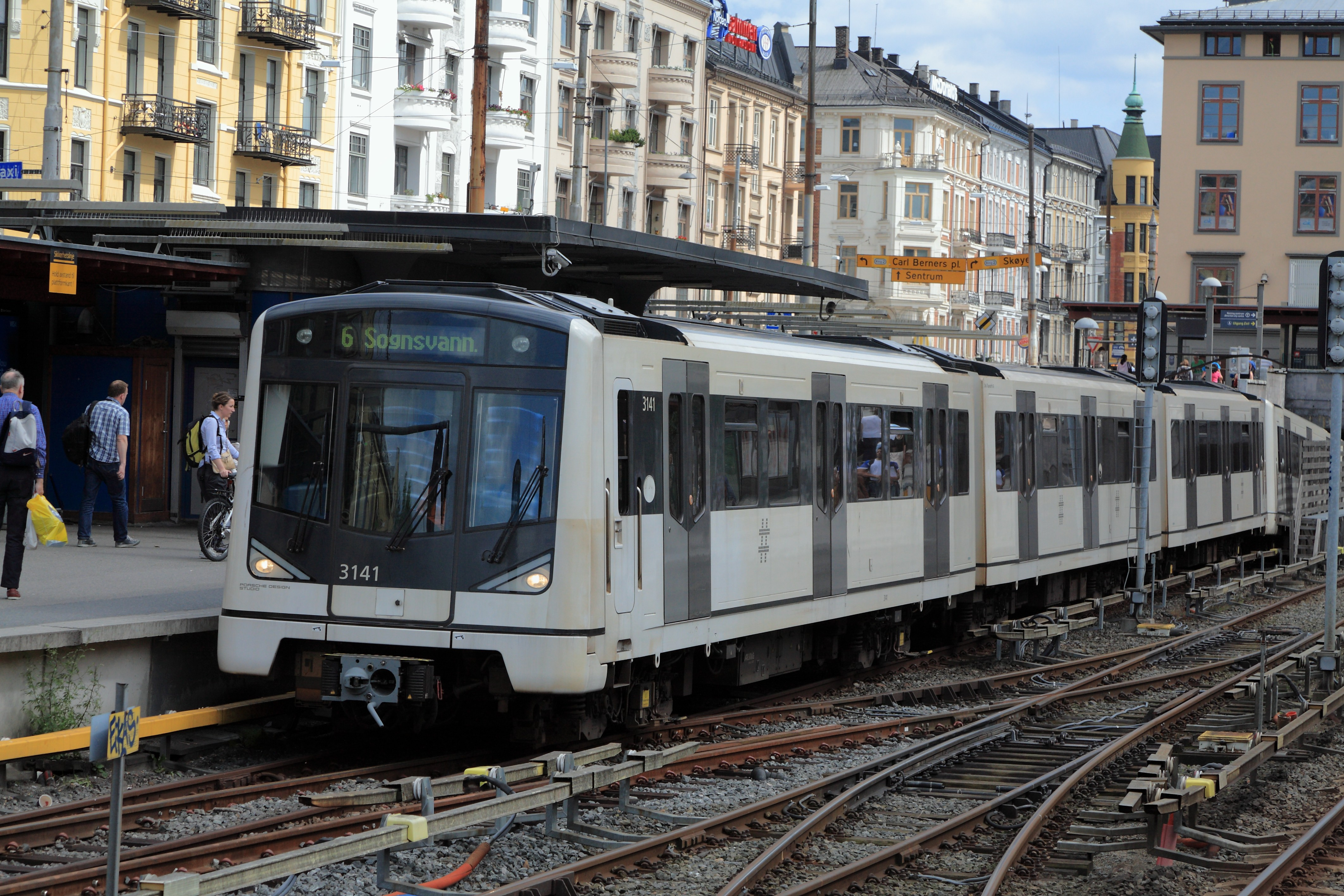
Majorstuen, the westernmost station of the Common Tunnel, is proposed as the Fornebu Line's terminus.

The first metro proposal, from 2009, called for the line to be built as a branch of the Kolsås Line from Ullernåsen. Except for a short portion at the southern end, the entire line was proposed in a tunnel. After Ullernåsen the line would have only three stations, Lysaker, Telenor Arena and Fornebu Senter. However, additional stations were considered. Eight hourly services were proposed, which could or could not continue from Majorstuen through the Common Tunnel. Further plans called for an upgrade to allow a fly-over at Makrellbekken, on the Røa Line.

A second main proposal was launched in 2011, whereby the metro would follow a new route. It would leave Majorstuen in its own right-of-way in a tunnel. It would turn ninety degrees and run under the Frogner Park to a station at Skøyen. From there it would run close to Bestumkilden, with an intermediate station at Vækerø before reaching Lysaker. The line would have three stations on Fornebu: Telenor Arena, Flytårnet (Telenor) and Fornebu Senter. Ruter recommended this alternative, based on its combination of fast travel time to the city center and that a metro alternative is the only service which can be guaranteed to have sufficient capacity in the long run. Ruter estimated the cost of a metro via Ullernåsen at 3.0 billion kroner and via Skøyen at 4.5 billion kroner in 2011.

The Skøyen route has an estimated travel time of 5 minutes from Fornebu Senter to Lysaker and 12 minutes from Fornebu Senter to Majorstuen. This involves building a 2,600 meters (8,500 ft) from Majorstuen to Skøyen, 1,250 meters (4,100 ft) to Vækerø, 1,350 kilometers (840 mi) to Lysaker, 1,050 meters (3,440 ft) to Arena, 900 meters (3,000 ft) to Flytårnet and 1,000 meters (3,300 ft) to Fornebu Senter. Sixty percent of the line will run in Oslo. There has also been proposals to build a station at Madserud and the Frogner Park, although the need given the sparse population has been questioned.

A major challenge with the metro alternative is the network's congestion through the Common Tunnel, which is shared by all lines between Majorstuen and Tøyen. Currently the capacity through the tunnel is limited to 28 trains per hour per direction, although Ruter hopes than improvements in signaling can increase this to 32. This, combined with turning trains from the Holmenkollen Line at Majorstuen, will allow all eight hourly metro trains to reach the downtown area. There are plans to build a second metro tunnel through the city center, with estimates for completion around 2030.

== Bibliography ==
- Akershus County Municipality (2004). Bane til Fornebu – Samlet fremstilling, april 2004 (in Norwegian).
- Berthelsen, Jørn (1981). Reisen til flyplassen (in Norwegian). Oslo: Institute of Transport Economics. ISBN 82-7133-343-7.
- Bredal, Dag (1998). Oslo lufthavn Gardermoen: Porten til Norge (in Norwegian). Schibsted. ISBN 82-516-1719-7.
- Deloitte (2012). Realisering av Fornebubanen gjennom fellesskapsfinansiering (PDF) (in Norwegian).
- Haldsrud, Stian (2013). Banen og byen (in Norwegian). Oslo: Storbyforlaget. ISBN 978-82-999426-0-7.
- Kristiania og Akers Sporveiskomite (1919). Indstilling fra Kristiania og Akers Sporveiskomite. Avsnit 1 : Forstadsbaner (in Norwegian).
- Norwegian Public Roads Administration, Norwegian National Rail Administration and Asplan Viak (2001). Kollektivbetjening av Fornebu (PDF) (in Norwegian).
- Norwegian State Railways (1986). Hovedflyplass: Jernbane i tilbringingen (PDF) (in Norwegian).
- Oslo Sporveier, Norwegian National Rail Administration and Civitas (1997). Kombibane Oslo (in Norwegian).
- Ruter (2010). Kollektivtrafikkløsning på Fornebu (PDF) (in Norwegian).
- Ruter (2011). Kollektivtrafikkbetjening av Fornebu (PDF) (in Norwegian). Archived from the original (PDF) on 7 June 2014.
- Ruter (2013). Konseptvalgutredning for anskaffelse av nye trikker (PDF) (in Norwegian). Archived from the original (PDF) on 7 June 2014.
- Wisting, Tor (1989). Oslo lufthavn Fornebu 1939–1989 (in Norwegian). TWK-forlaget. ISBN 82-90884-00-1.
