= Steinar Killi =

Norwegian civil servant (born 1941)

Steinar Killi (born 1941) is a Norwegian civil servant who has had various leading positions within transportation in government agencies and is director of the Norwegian National Rail Administration.

He graduated in economics from the University of Oslo in 1966 and has been researcher at the Institute of Transport Economics (1967–69), in the Norwegian Public Roads Administration (1969–78) and in the Ministry of Transport and Communications until 1990 when he became director of the construction of Oslo Airport, Gardermoen. On June 11, 1999 he replaced Osmund Ueland as director of Jernbaneverket.

| Preceded by Osmund Ueland | Director of the Norwegian National Rail Administration; 1999–2008 | Succeeded by Elisabeth Enger |
