= Øyvind Sørbrøden =

Norwegian civil servant

Øyvind Sørbrøden (born 10 January 1945) is a Norwegian civil servant and organizational leader.

He is best known as the director of the Norwegian Association of Local and Regional Authorities from 1986 to 2002. He has also been chief administrative officer (rådmann) in Sortland Municipality, and after 1992 he ran his own consulting company. He has a degree in economics, and was the secretary-general of AIESEC from 1968 to 1969.

He resides in Vettre.

Preceded by Arne Ø. Rødskog	Director of the Norwegian Association of Local and Regional Authorities; 1986-1992	Succeeded by Elisabeth Enger (acting)
