= BaneTele =

Former Norwegian telecommunications company

BaneTele AS
- Type: Private
- Industry: Telecommunication
- Founded: 1996
- Headquarters: Oslo, Norway
- Area served: Norway
- Key people: Jan Morten Ruud (CEO)
- Products: Fiberoptic network
- Number of employees: 150 (2006)
- Parent: Norwegian Ministry of Trade and Industry, Bredbåndsalliansen
- Website: www.banetele.no

BaneTele was a Norwegian part state owned telecommunications company previously part of the Norwegian State Railways. The company provided stem fiberoptic cable network in Norway along the railway and power grid. The company had its headquarters in Oslo.

The company only offered the central network capacity, not any content. Along with Telenor it was the only company to offer central network services, covering 70 cities north to Tromsø. The company sold its products to smaller customers through agents or other operators while larger customers could purchase directly from BaneTele. In total the BaneTele network was 12,500 km long.

== History ==
The Norwegian State Railways (NSB) built a parallel copper network along the railway for internal communication and signaling; by 1899 this network was complete. In 1985 NSB started the construction of a fibre network. By 1996 this was made a division of the Jernbaneverket, the newly created track operator, with the name BaneTele. The division was made a limited company in 2001. The same year BaneTele bought the remains of the bankrupt company Enitel which was created by numerous Norwegian electricity companies to build a national fibre network along the power grid. Enitel had also bought Telia Norway after the failed merge between Telia and Telenor. Enitel went bankrupt in 2001 and the power grid network was merged with the railway network. In 2002 the ownership of BaneTele was transferred from Jernbaneverket to the government. In 2006 50% of BaneTele was sold to Bredbåndsalliansen, which in turn is owned by 6 Norwegian electricity companies, thereby reinstating some of the ownership that was lost when Enitel went bankrupt.
