= Osmund Ueland =

Norwegian civil servant

Osmund Ueland (born 27 September 1947) is a Norwegian civil servant and former CEO of Norges Statsbaner (NSB).

An engineer by education, he worked for Aker from 1975 to 1990. From 1990 to 1994, he headed the Lillehammer Olympic Organising Committee (LOOC). In 1994, he was hired as CEO for NSB Gardermobanen; the next year he was promoted to become CEO in the Norwegian State Railways. In 1996, the Norwegian State Railways was demerged to create two entities; Norges Statsbaner and the Norwegian National Rail Administration. Ueland was the director of both, leaving the National Rail Administration in 1999. He was then fired after heavy criticism related to his leadership of NSB in 2000.

Civic offices
Preceded by Kristian Rambjør	Chief executive of the Norwegian State Railways (1883–1996); 1995–1996	Succeeded by –
Preceded by position created	Chief executive of the Norwegian State Railways; 1996–2000	Succeeded by Randi Flesland (acting)
Preceded by position created	Director of the Norwegian National Rail Administration; 1996–1999	Succeeded by Steinar Killi
