= Arne Ø. Rødskog =

Arne Ø. Rødskog (16 May 1922 – 24 January 1991) was a Norwegian organizational leader.

He is best known as the director of the Norwegian Association of Local and Regional Authorities from 1979 to 1986. He had worked in that organization, or its predecessors, since 1958. He was also a board member of Kommunal Landspensjonskasse.

He hailed from Oslo, took the cand.jur. degree and served as a deputy judge for a short time before being hired in Norges Kooperative Landsforening, which he left in 1958.

Preceded by Kjell T. Evers	Director of the Norwegian Association of Local and Regional Authorities; 1979-1986	Succeeded by Øyvind Sørbrøden
