= Oksenøen =

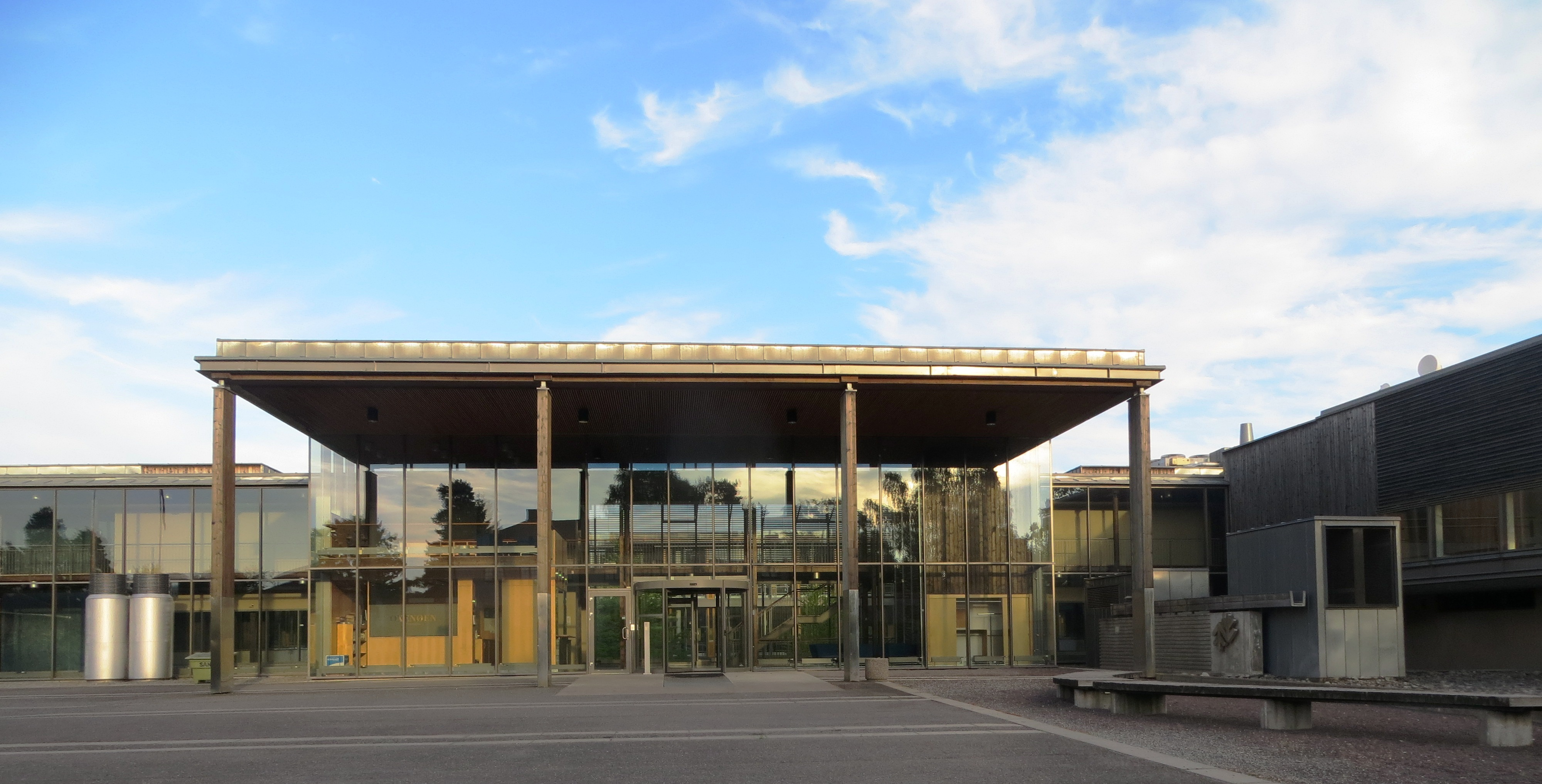
- Interactive map of the Oksenøen area

General information
- Type: Office
- Architectural style: Postmodernism
- Location: Fornebu, Norway, Oksenøyveien 70–84
- Coordinates: 59.8975°N 10.6052°E
- Inaugurated: 8 January 1999
- Owner: Aspelin Ramm and Oslo Bolig- og Sparelag

Technical details
- Floor area: 5,700 m^{2} (61,000 sq ft)

Design and construction
- Architects: Magnus Poulsson (1919); Lund & Hagem Arkitekter (1999)

Website
- oxenoenbruk.no

Oksenøen, also spelled Oxenøen and Oksenøyen, and sometimes referred to as Oksenøen Bruk, is an office complex on the peninsula of Fornebu in Bærum Municipality, Norway. Traditionally the site consisted of two farms, Store Oksenøen and Lille Oksenøen, which date back to the late Iron Age. The site became a market garden from 1919. This was rebuilt to create a 14,000-square-meter (150,000 sq ft) office complex which opened in 1999. The complex was until 2013 the head office of Norske Skog.

== History ==
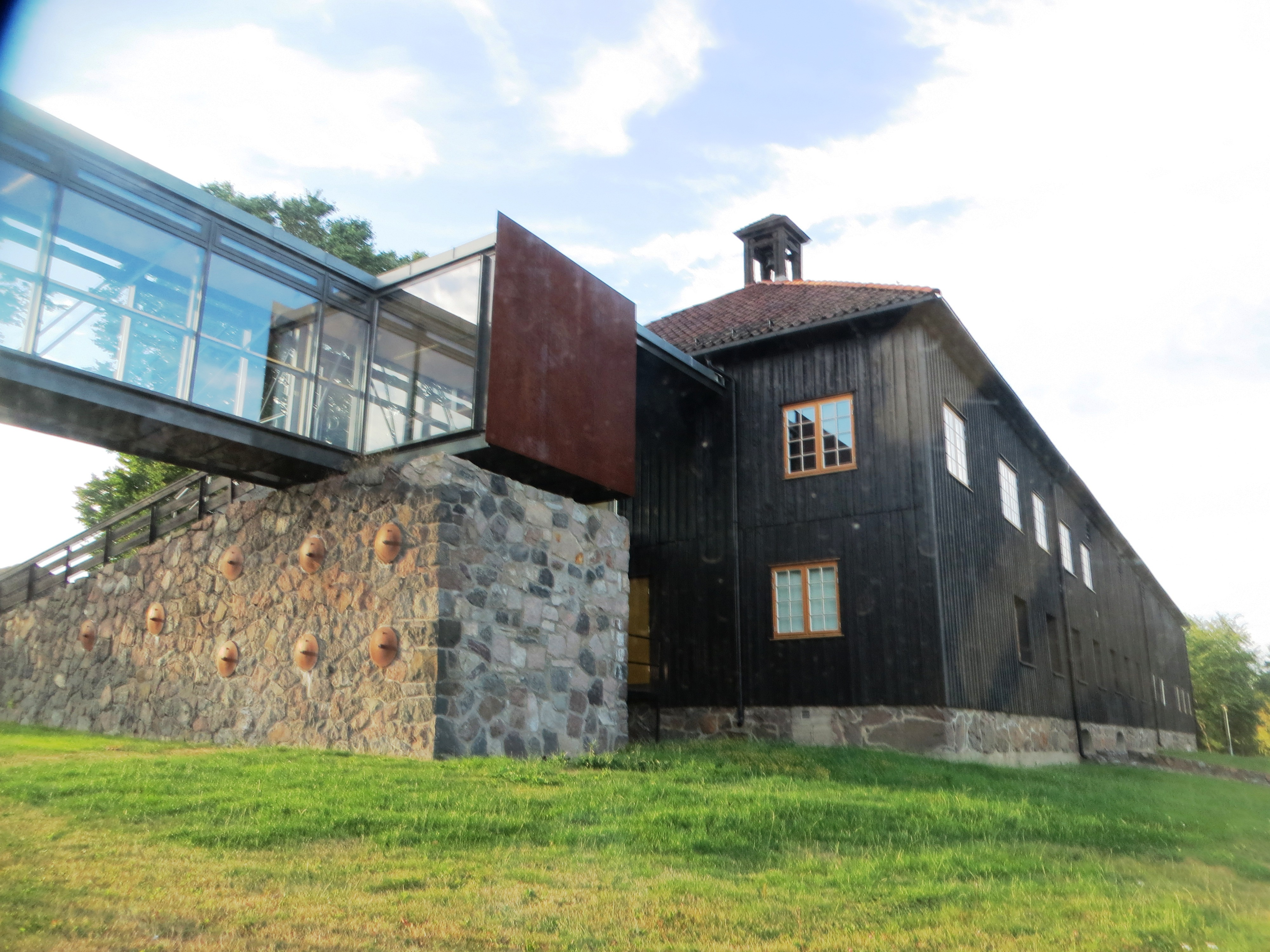

Settlements at Oksenøen have been dated to the Germanic Iron Age and Viking Age, in the period 600 to 1050 AD. A burial mound at Lille Oksenøen has been dated to the same period. Oksenøen has since the Middle Ages consisted of two farms, Store Øksenøen (colloquially Storøen) and Lille Øksenøen (colloquially Lilleøen). The latter was considerably smaller. These two, along with the farm Fornebu, came under ownership of the Catholic Church during the early Middle Ages. Following the Reformation in 1537, ownership passed to the state. Shortly afterwards Lille Øksenøen was taken over by private owners, with frequent changes of ownership. It became a croft in 1771, and became part of the Fornebu estate in 1812. Store Øksenøen remained owned by the state until 1838. The property was split in 1867.

The opening of the Drammen Line in 1872 made the Fornebu area attractive for housing. Gradually areas were parceled for housing, although Oksenøen was too far from the train line to be attractive for much more than summer cottages. There was a small road which led to the farms. In the early 20th century Oksenøen was converted into a market garden. Designed by Palace Gardener Nickelsen and Architect Magnus Poulsson, the facility was completed in 1919. It consisted of eight to ten buildings and ten to twelve greenhouses. It was the largest market garden in the Nordic Countries in 1919, and by far the largest such facility in Norway to be built with a central plan.

Oslo Airport, Fornebu was established in 1939. Due to the break-out of the Second World War, the Norwegian Army Air Service established a base at Oksenøen on 3 September. The greenhouses were used as barracks. In the German invasion of Norway starting 9 April 1940, Fornebu fell under attack and was bombed on 12 April, although the buildings at Oksenøen were not damaged. Until 1945 the area became occupied by Luftwaffe. North of Oksenøen a branch of Grini detention camp was built to supply manpower to operate the air base.

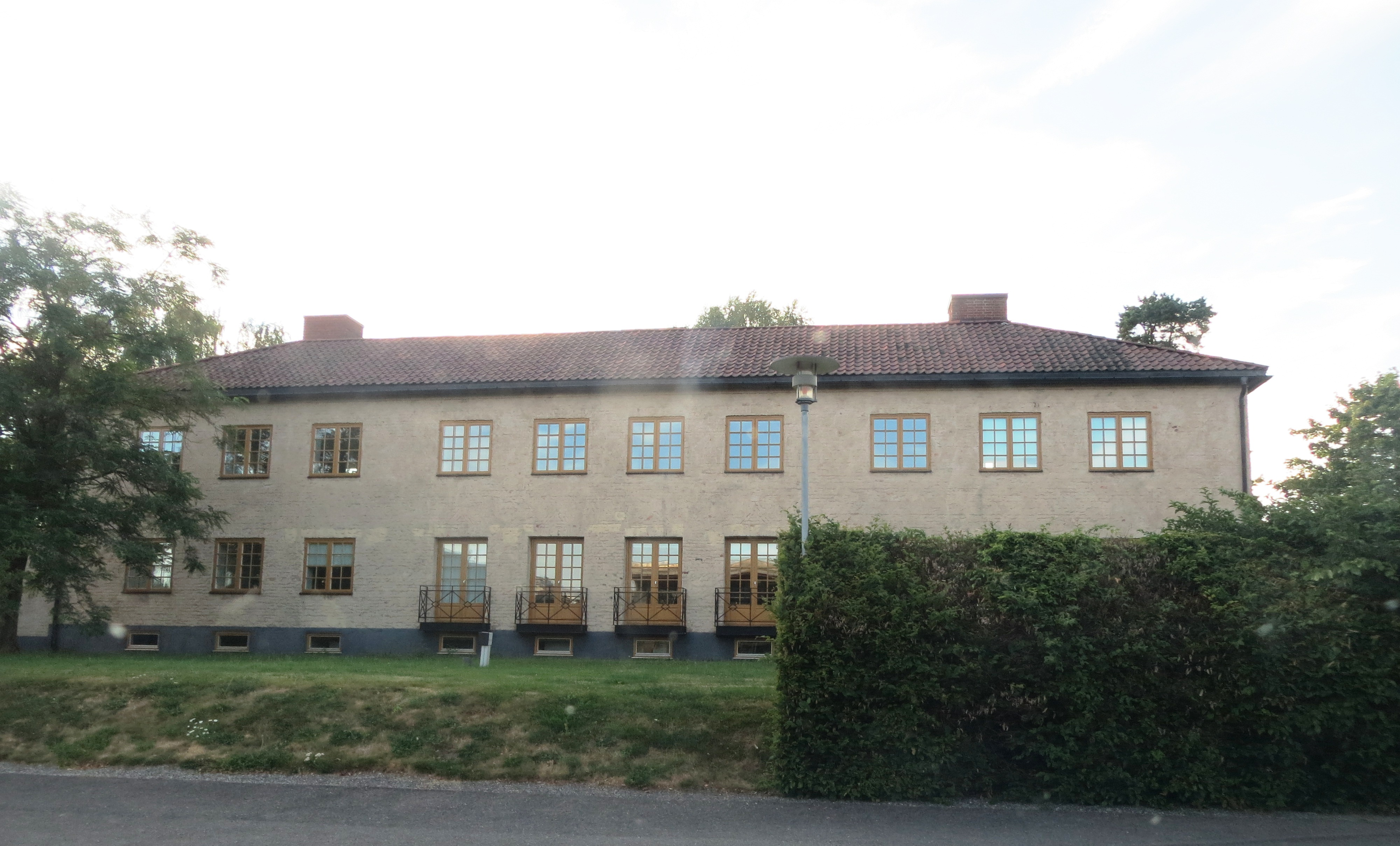

As part of the Oslo Airport location controversy, Øksenøen was proposed as a site for a new international terminal for the airport. This would create a situation with two terminals on each side of the runway, connected by a subterranean passageway. The Oksenøen terminal was further proposed to receive a train station, which would be built as a branch of the Drammen Line.

Norske Skog bought the property from the Norwegian Directorate of Public Construction and Property in August 1996, pending the 1998 closure of Oslo Airport, Fornebu. The company intended relocating from their former offices at Granfoss Næringspark in Lysaker. The site was upgraded to a complex consisting of 5,700 square meters (61,000 sq ft), with space for 200 employees. The site was designed by Lund & Hagem Arkitekter and cost 140 million Norwegian krone. Moving into the office buildings at Oksenøen took place on 8 January 1999. Although the corporation had for a long time had offices in Lysaker, the annual meeting on 5 May 1999 approved that the grope move its head offices from Fiborgtangen in Levanger Municipality to Bærum Municipality. Norske Skog sold Oxenøen effective 1 October 2008 to a consortium of Aspelin Ramm and Oslo Bolig- og Sparelag for NOK 429.5 million. The corporation was experience a difficult financial situation and needed to sell assets to pay off debt. Due to the corporate downsizing, Norske Skog relocated to Karenlyst allé 49 at Skøyen in Oslo from June 2013.

== Bibliography ==
- Bærum Municipality (1994). Forstudie av verneinteresser på Fornebu (in Norwegian).
- Pollen, Geir (2007). Langt fra stammen (in Norwegian). Oslo: Gyldendal Norsk Forlag. ISBN 978-82-05-34625-3.
