= Elisabeth Enger =

Norwegian civil servant

Elisabeth Enger (born 1 July 1958) is a Norwegian civil servant, from August 2008 director of the Norwegian National Rail Administration.

She was a bureaucrat in Akershus County Municipality from 1980 to 1982, and then consultant and later chief administrative officer (rådmann) in Skodje Municipality from 1983 to 1989. She then worked as a director in Norwegian Association of Local and Regional Authorities. She returned as chief administrative officer in Lier Municipality from 1994 to 2001 and Bærum Municipality from 2001 to 2008.

She has the cand.mag. degree.

Preceded by Øyvind Sørbrøden	Director of the Norwegian Association of Local and Regional Authorities (acting); 1993	Succeeded by Søren Gunnar Torsdal
Preceded by Steinar Killi	Director of the Norwegian National Rail Administration; 2008–present	Incumbent
