= Jernbaneverket =

Defunct government agency responsible for maintenance of Norwegian railways

- Company type: Government agency
- Industry: Railway infrastructure
- Founded: 1996
- Defunct: 2016
- Fate: Closed by the Government of Norway, assets were transferred to Bane NOR and the Norwegian Railway Directorate.
- Successors: Bane NOR; Norwegian Railway Directorate (Jernbanedirektoratet)
- Headquarters: Oslo, Norway
- Area served: Norway
- Key people: Elisabeth Enger (Director)
- Parent: Norwegian Ministry of Transport and Communications
- Website: www.jernbaneverket.no

Jernbaneverket (lit. 'the railway administration') was a government agency responsible for owning, maintaining, operating and developing the Norwegian railway network, including the track, stations, classification yards, traffic management and timetables. Safety oversight was the duty of the Norwegian Railway Inspectorate, while numerous operating companies run trains on the lines; the largest being the state owned passenger company Vy (formerly NSB) and the freight company CargoNet.

The administration operated all railways in Norway, except public station areas and freight terminals built before 1997 and private sidings. All track is standard gauge, with a total of 4,230 kilometres (2,630 mi), of which 2,498 kilometres (1,552 mi) is electrified, and 245 kilometres (152 mi) is double track. The Norwegian Railway Museum was a subsidiary of the rail administration.

On 1 December 1996, NSB was split up; formally NSB and the inspectorate were demerged from the National Rail Administration, and NSB made a limited company. All three became subordinate to the Norwegian Ministry of Transport and Communications. The administration got its own chief executive, Steinar Killi, from 1 July 1999.

On 31 December 2016, as a result of the rail reform of the Conservative lead government coalition, the administration was dissolved and all tasks were transferred to Bane NOR or the Norwegian Railway Directorate. Bane NOR took over ownership of the infrastructure from 1 January 2017.

== History ==
State ownership of railways was initially through partial ownership of the many lines built during the 1860s and 1870s; by 1883, the authorities decided to create the Norwegian State Railways (NSB) that would own and operate most lines. By the 1960s, passenger transport on private railways was abolished, and only a few private lines remained; the last, the Kirkenes–Bjørnevatn Line, was closed in 1997. Since then the agency has operated all railway lines in the country, except tramways and the Oslo T-bane, that are operated by their respective counties.

During the 1990s, multiple rounds of reforms and restructurings were enacted upon NSB and the Norwegian railway sector, one of which saw the rise of a new organisation model in 1992 under which infrastructure activities were organised principally under regional managers, which were given more responsibility and consequently reinforced by technical and administrative support functions. On 1 December 1996, the National Rail Administration was created via the division of Norges Statsbaner into two agencies, the Norwegian National Rail Administration and the Norwegian Railway Inspectorate, as well as one limited company, NSB BA. Prior to 1 July 1999, NSB and the administration continued to have the same board and the same director, Osmund Ueland.

An early issue for the administration to address was appropriate scaling of its workforce against it activities. Due to the inhospitable winter climate in Norway, many infrastructure activities become unfeasible for months at a time, leading to temporary overcapacity with numerous staff having no assigned work; this was difficult to account for in conventional means of competitive tendering for major maintenance and renewal projects, and came at a considerable premium in terms of both price and productivity. Between 1992 and 2006, there was a gradual yet meaningful reduction in administrative staff and production personnel from 2,100 to 1,350. The administration also anticipated future increases in difficulties pertaining to Norway's climate, as an increase in precipitation would likely lead to more frequent landslides; proactive measures taken to guard against this danger included setting up a comprehensive inventory of landslide-prone sites, the implementation of physical preventative measures in such sites, as well as close cooperation with the Norwegian Meteorological Institute to establish additional weather stations to provide more reliable forecasts. Such measures are intended to boost regional readiness to response to climate-related emergency situations.

Starting in 1985, NSB and Televerket jointly constructed a national network of optical fiber that progressively covered the entire railway network. This network remained part of Jernbaneverket until 2001, at which point it was transferred to the subsidiary BaneTele. That same year, it acquired the bankrupt telecom company Enitel, and the whole subsidiary transferred to the Norwegian Ministry of Trade and Industry in 2002. During 2010, it was announced that Alcatel-Lucent had been selected by the administration to deploy an advanced high-speed network based on IP/MPLS technology to handle all railway-related business communications, such as train signaling, signage on station platforms, and the GSM-R radio communications network.

During the mid-2000s, considerable growth in both passenger and freight traffic was recorded, while punctuality figures in excess of 90 percent, the best in the NSB's history, had also been attained. Much of the nation's lines were single track, which constrained both capacity, flexibility, and opportunities to further improve punctuality; hence, several schemes to double track particularly busy stretches of single track were enacted, particularly in and around the capital city of Oslo. Furthermore, in June 2004, the Norwegian parliament authorised an additional NOK 10 billion of investments in the nation's railway in addition to that which was already allocated under the National Transport Plan for the period 2006–2015.

The administration undertook various programmes to improve safety upon the rail network. It was responsible for a continuous process of dynamically amending various requirements, standards and procedures to account for the introduction of new technologies as well as improvements in knowledge, particularly in respect to human error factors. Having identified significant risk factors associated with roughly 4,000 (as of 2005) level crossings that served mainly residential and agricultural areas, a systematic effort was undertaken to reduced the number of such crossings. By 2005, the administration was openly stating its long-term objective of eliminating level crossings as a part of the modernisation of Norway's railways.

By the mid-2000s, the administration was playing a leading role in the introduction of GSM-R digital radio communications. A NOK 1.7 billion development programme was underway to roll out this European system to facilitate secure, rapid, and effective communication between line traffic controllers, train drivers, and other railway personnel; it also better facilitated international railway operations along with increased competition between train operating companies. Despite Norway's relatively challenging topography, the introduction of GSM-R was relatively swift, priority having been given to stretches of track where preceding emergency communication systems had been unsatisfactory. Comprising 700 ground-based installations for coverage of 3,800 kilometres of track and 600 tunnels, the system was in place on along all Norwegian lines by 2007. During the 2010s, the administration contracted Nokia to provide various services, from implementing a quality management system, provideing support, and driving improvements in relation to Norway's GSM-R network.

During 2005, the maintenance division was demerged, and established as the limited company Baneservice, owned directly by the ministry. This restructuring was part of a program initiated by the conservative-liberal government to privatize the maintenance of the tracks, compelling the administration to perform tenders; similar policies were being enforced on the Public Roads Administration and Coastal Administration. The process of privatizing the work of 1,100 employees was discontinued after the 2005 election, following the victory of the socialist coalition government; despite this reversal, the administration stated its intention to continue to tender various projects where it would be economically desirable to do so.

During the late 2000s, the administration anticipated a doubling of freight traffic over the following decade; to accommodate the running additional and longer freight trains, an investment of NOK 3.7 billion in various capacity enhancement works targeted at freight operations was proposed for the period between 2010 and 2019. This work largely focused on the expansion of freight terminals and the provision of additional passing loops. In terms of tonnage, intermodal traffic accounts for 85 percent of all freight traffic, thus the administration explored the concept of intermodal transport of containers, semi-trailers and swap bodies between various major Norwegian cities using modern road-rail transfer terminals.

During the late 2000s and early 2010s, Norwegian authorities became increasingly vocal on the prospects of high-speed rail operations; specifically, the Ministry of Transport and Communications commissioned an independent assessment of high-speed rail's feasibility in the country that conceived of a new network of single-track electrified high-speed routes with a maximum speed of 250km/h roughly in parallels with core routes of the existing conventional network. In 2009, a proposal for the national transport plan for the period 2010-2019 included the construction of the Follo Line, a new 24km double-track line between Oslo Central Station and Ski at an initially estimated cost of NOK 11.6 billion. In March 2015, the administration signed a joint contract with the Spanish construction group Acciona and Italian contractor Ghella to build the Blix Tunnel, the largest civil engineering feature of the Follo Line; construction work started later that same year.

== Operations ==
All track in Norway is standard gauge, covering a total distance of 4,230 kilometres (2,630 mi), of which 2,498 kilometres (1,552 mi) is electrified at 15 kV 16.7 Hz AC, and 245 kilometres (152 mi) is double track. The Gardermoen Line, at 64 kilometres (40 mi), is the only high-speed line. The network consists of 716 tunnels, 2,572 bridges and 3,690 level crossings. In 2012, Norway's railways transported 61,121,000 passengers for 3,202 million passenger kilometers and 30,271,000 tonnes of cargo for 3,489 million tonne kilometers. That same year, there were 20 train-related accidents, with two fatalities.

=== Organization ===
The administration was divided into a directorate and divisions for infrastructure management, infrastructure construction and traffic management; BaneEnergi is subordinate to the traffic management and was responsible for supplying electricity to the railway companies. Main offices was located in Oslo, while regional offices was located in Bergen, Hamar and Trondheim, while train control areas was also located in Drammen, Kristiansand, Stavanger and Narvik. The administration also ran the Norwegian Railway College in Oslo and the Norwegian Railway Museum in Hamar. The agency had about 2,900 employees.

In 2007, the administration had a revenue of NOK 5,661 million, of which 1,934 M went to operation, 1,369 M to maintenance, 67 M to the Gardermoen Line and 2,291 M to investments. Of the investments 82% went to new lines, notably the Asker Line (25%), Stavanger–Sandnes (17%), Lysaker Station (17%) and Ganddal Yard (8%). The administration received most of its income from the ministry, but railway companies had to pay to use the Gardermoen Line.

=== Stations ===
At the time of the demerger, all stations were transferred to NSB, but the administration retained ownership of the platforms. All stations opened after 1996 were owned by the administration; this has caused a complex ownership structure where sections of the stations may have different owners. The operation of all stations was remained at the administration, while the NSB subsidiary Rom Eiendom is responsible for managing the railway unrelated sections of the stations, for instance the shopping center in Oslo Central Station.

=== Railway companies ===
The companies that have agreements to access the national railway are Borregård Rail, Cargolink, CargoNet, Flytoget, Green Cargo, Hector Rail, Malmtrafik, Norwegian State Railways, NSB Gjøvikbanen, Ofotbanen, Peterson Rail, SJ, Tågåkeriet and the Valdres Line.

=== Rolling stock ===
Jernbaneverket maintained a small fleet of maintenance trains and track inspection railcars themselves. All of Jernbaneverkets trains are yellow and diesel operated. When Baneservice was demerged, they took over most of the maintenance units. Jernbaneverket's stock:

- 1 Di 3a (snowplow)
- 3 Di R3 (snowplow and shunter)
- 2 MZ
- 2 Skd 225 (shunter)
- 17 LM2 (catenary inspection)
- 4 LM4 (catenary rebuilding)
- 5 LM5 (catenary maintenance)
- 5 LM6 (catenary maintenance)
- 1 Roger 300 (track inspection)
- 1 Roger 1000 (track inspection)
- 1 YF1 (rescue)

== Bibliography ==
- Norwegian National Rail Administration (2012). Jernbanestatistikk 2012 (PDF). Oslo: Norwegian National Rail Administration. Archived from the original (PDF) on 23 October 2013.
- Norwegian National Rail Administration (2008b). Mer på skinner! (PDF). Oslo: Norwegian National Rail Administration.
