= Institute of Transport Economics =

Characteristic of transport economics

- Type: Foundation
- Industry: Research
- Founded: 1954
- Headquarters: Oslo, Norway
- Area served: Norway
- Revenue: 100 million kr
- Number of employees: 90
- Website: www.toi.no

The Institute of Transport Economics (Transportøkonomisk institutt –TØI) is a national, Norwegian institution for multidisciplinary transport research. Its mission is to develop and disseminate transportation knowledge of scientific quality and practical application. The Institute is an independent, non-profit research foundation. It holds no interests in any commercial, manufacturing or supplying organisation.

TØI has a multidisciplinary research environment with approximately 110 employees, of which about 80 are researchers.

Its sphere of activity includes most of the current issues in road, rail, sea and air transport, as well as urban mobility, environmental sustainability and road safety. In recent years the Institute has been engaged in more than 70 research projects under the EU's Research Framework Programmes.
