= List of boroughs of Oslo =

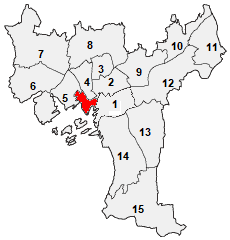
Boroughs of Oslo in 2022, Sentrum in red.

The 15 boroughs of Oslo were created on 1 January 2004. They each have an elected local council with limited responsibilities.

Borough	Residents	Area	Number
Alna	49 801	13,7 km^{2}	12
Bjerke	33 422	7,7 km^{2}	9
Frogner	59 269	8,3 km^{2}	5
Gamle Oslo	58 671	7,5 km^{2}	1
Grorud	27 707	8,2 km^{2}	10
Grünerløkka	62 423	4,8 km^{2}	2
Nordre Aker	52 327	13,6 km^{2}	8
Nordstrand	52 459	16,9 km^{2}	14
Sagene	45 089	3,1 km^{2}	3
St. Hanshaugen	38 945	3,6 km^{2}	4
Stovner	33 316	8,2 km^{2}	11
Søndre Nordstrand	39 066	18,4 km^{2}	15
Ullern	34 596	9,4 km^{2}	6
Vestre Aker	50 157	16,6 km^{2}	7
Østensjø	50 806	12,2 km^{2}	13

In addition is Marka (1610 residents), that is administered by several boroughs; and Sentrum (1471 residents, 1.8 km^{2}) that is partially administered by St. Hanshaugen, and in part directly by the city council. As of 1 January 2020, Oslo had 693,494 residents, of which 2386 were not allocated to a borough.

== Former borough structure ==
=== Borough structure 1973–88 ===
From 1973 to 30 June 1988, Oslo had 40 boroughs. Some existed only on paper, since they were to be constituted only when the areas were built.

- Borough 1: Ruseløkka, Skillebekk, Frogner
- Borough 2: Homansbyen, Uranienborg, Majorstua, parts of Fagerborg
- Borough 3: St. Hanshaugen, Gamle Aker, parts of Ila and Fagerborg
- Borough 4: Marienlyst, Ullevål, Lindern, parts of Fagerborg
- Borough 5: Bjølsen, Sagene, parts of Ila
- Borough 6: Sandaker, Åsen, Torshov
- Borough 7: Grünerløkka, Møllergata
- Borough 8: Sinsen, Rodeløkka, parts of Tøyen
- Borough 9: Grønland, Gamlebyen, Kampen, Vålerenga, parts of Tøyen
- Borough 10: Ekeberg, Holtet, Bekkelaget
- Borough 11: Nordstrand
- Borough 12–13–14: Holmlia, Hauketo, Rudene
- Borough 15: Lambertseter
- Borough 16–17: Banderud, Skullerud, Rustad, Bøler, Ulsrud, Tveteråsen
- Borough 18: Ryen, Manglerud, Abildsø
- Borough 19: Skøyen, Oppsal, parts of Trasop
- Borough 20: Etterstad, Helsfyr, Teisen
- Borough 21–22: Tveita, Hellerud, Haugerud, Trosterud, parts of Trasop
- Borough 23 was to take parts of boroughs 20, 24 and 31
- Borough 24–25: Lindeberg, Furuset, Ellingsrud, Haugenstua, Høybråten, Tangerud
- Borough 26: Rommen, Fossum, Stovner
- Borough 27: Romsås
- Borough 28: Rødtvet, Ammerud, parts of Grorud
- Borough 29: Kalbakken, Flaen, parts of Grorud
- Borough 30: Linderud, Veitvet, Sletteløkka
- Borough 31: Løren, Risløkka, Økern
- Borough 32: Lofthus, Årvoll, Tonsenhagen
- Borough 33: Nydalen, Grefsen, Kjelsås
- Borough 34: Tåsen, Korsvoll, Kringsjå
- Borough 35: Vinderen, Ris, Slemdal, Holmenkollen
- Borough 36: Røa, Hovseter, Voksen
- Borough 37: Ullernåsen, Lysaker, Bestum
- Borough 38: Huseby, Smestad, Skøyen
- Borough 39: Bygdøy
- Borough 40: Marka, the islands

=== Borough structure 1988–2004 ===
From 1985 to 1988, the boroughs of Stovner, Røa, Gamle Oslo and Søndre Nordstrand were trials for the new system. From 1 July 1988 to 31 December 2003, Oslo had 25 boroughs:

- Borough 1: Bygdøy–Frogner
- Borough 2: Uranienborg–Majorstuen
- Borough 3: St.Hanshaugen–Ullevål
- Borough 4: Sagene–Torshov
- Borough 5: Grünerløkka–Sofienberg
- Borough 6: Gamle Oslo
- Borough 7: Ekeberg–Bekkelaget
- Borough 8: Nordstrand
- Borough 9: Søndre Nordstrand
- Borough 10: Lambertseter
- Borough 11: Bøler
- Borough 12: Manglerud
- Borough 13: Østensjø
- Borough 14: Helsfyr-Sinsen
- Borough 15: Hellerud
- Borough 16: Furuset
- Borough 17: Stovner
- Borough 18: Romsås
- Borough 19: Grorud
- Borough 20: Bjerke
- Borough 21: Grefsen–Kjelsås
- Borough 22: Sogn
- Borough 23: Vinderen
- Borough 24: Røa
- Borough 25: Ullern

In addition Sentrum and Marka.
