= Sporveisbussene =

Bus company in Oslo, Norway

AS Sporveisbussene
- Company type: Subsidiary
- Industry: Transport
- Founded: 1997
- Headquarters: Oslo, Norway
- Area served: Oslo, Norway
- Key people: Tore Berg (CEO)
- Revenue: ▲NOK 643 million (2005)
- Number of employees: 977 (2005)
- Parent: Kollektivtransportproduksjon
- Subsidiaries: Nexus Trafikk; Lavprisekspressen
- Website: www.sporveien.no

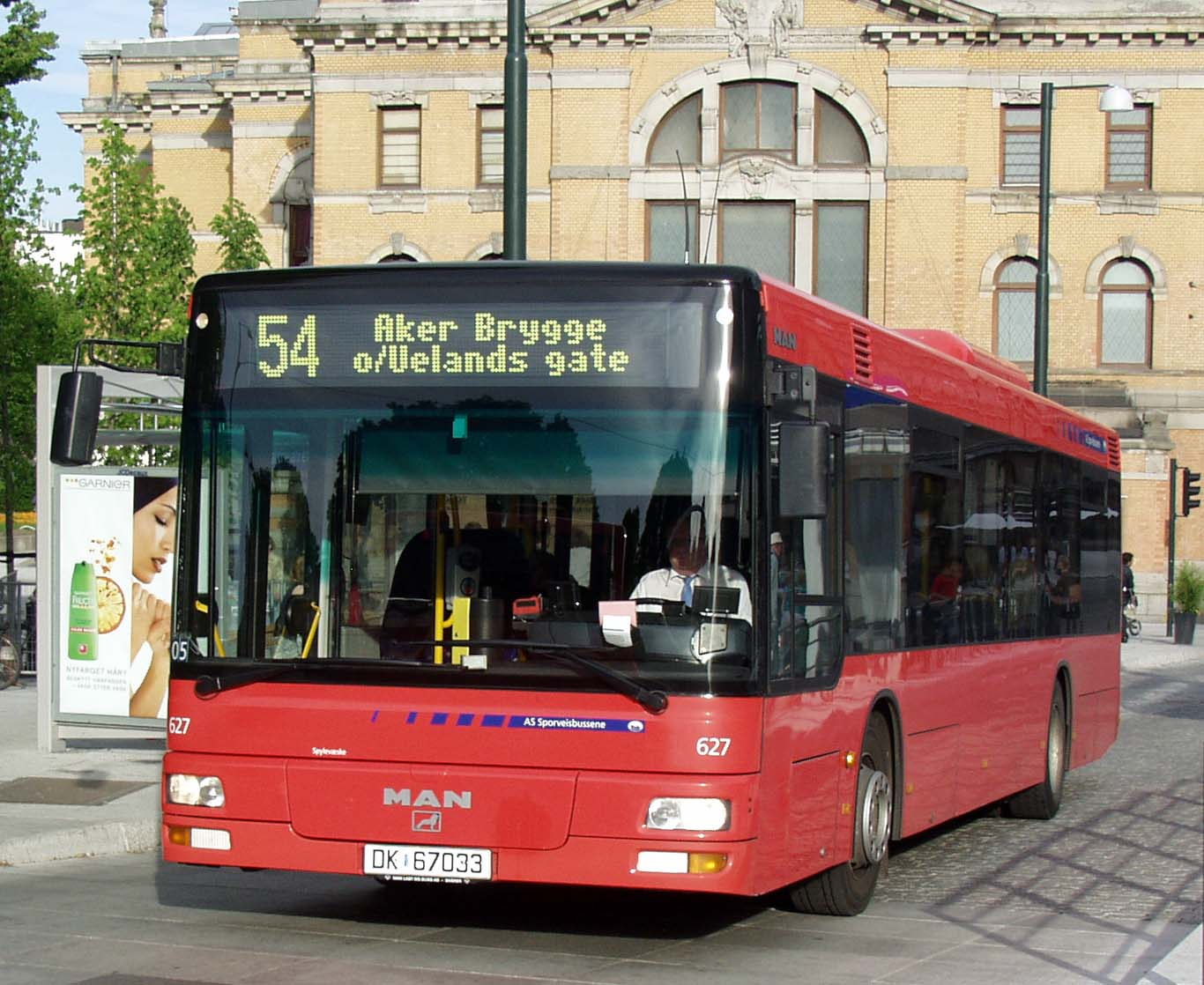
A MAN NL263 bus operated by Sporveisbussene

AS Sporveisbussene is a bus company that operates about 75% of the routes in Oslo, Norway. The company was created in 1997 when the then Oslo Sporveier was reorganised. It is now a subsidiary of Kollektivtransportproduksjon, a municipal company responsible for operating public transport in Oslo. In 2003 the Oslo City Council decided that bus transport in Oslo was to be based on public service obligation contracts, and Sporveisbussene has steadily lost its routes to these contracts. Instead, Sporveisbussene has established a subsidiary, Nexus Trafikk, that can compete in the competitions, and has won many of them. The company also operates the express coaches branded Lavprisekspressen.

== Fleet ==
Between them the two companies operate 413 buses, have 977 employees and have the headquarters at Alnabru in Oslo. As of 2005 the bus fleet consisted of:

- 72 MAN NG313 (articulated bus)
- 40 MAN NL263
- 11 MAN NL353
- 5 MAN midi buses
- 40 Mercedes-Benz Citaro (articulated bus)
- 64 Mercedes single buses
- 9 Mercedes-Benz Citaro (boggi bus)
- 8 Mercedes-Benz O520 Cito (service bus)
- 26 Scania single buses
- 22 Scania boggi buses
- 183 Solaris Urbino 18 (articulated bus)
- 13 Volvo articulated buses
- 9 Volvo single buses

== History ==
By the 1920s, the Oslo Tramway had grown to a series of lines spanning from the city center to new neighborhoods. While this allowed excellent transport from the city center to the residential areas, it did not permit easy transport between the neighborhoods. This gave rooms for bus transport, as a supplement to the tramway. On 13 November 1927, Oslo Sporveier, who operated the city trams, started Line 18 between Alexander Kiellands plass and Loelvdalen. The route ran every ten minutes, and the tickets cost NOK 0.25. The company had bought ten buses from Strømmens Værksted, each with room for 23 seated and 17 standing passengers. They had Hall Scott gasoline engines with a power output of 48 kilowatts (64 hp), and stationed at Vålerenga Depot. Five buses were needed to operate the route.

The next route was Line 19, which opened on 3 January 1928. It ran from Lille Tøyen Hageby to Grønlands torg. After a week, the line was further extended to Storgata, which was served by the tramway, thus allowing passengers to transfer. Most of the route ran parallel to the Kampen Line of the tramway, and the route was as such not diagonal. The first circular route was Line 20, which opened between Majorstuen and Carl Berners plass on 15 May 1928. From June, the route was extended from Majorstuen to Tordenskiolds plass via Neuberggata, Tidemandsgate, Magnus Bergs gate, Thomas Heftyes gate, Bygdøy allé, Drammensveien and Karl Johans gate. Line 21 opened on 25 June, running from Dælenengate and Colbjørsens gate to Waldemar Thranes gate, Bislett and Josefines gate. The new routes required 18 more similar buses from Strømmens Værksted.

In 1928, the company bought a trial bus from the United States, which had a capacity for 80 passengers. Oslo Sporveier followed up with a serial delivery of ten units which were slightly smaller and had a capacity of 60 passengers. To get the weight down to the maximum permitted 11 tonnes (11 long tons; 12 short tons), the body was built in aluminum. They had a six-cylinder engine with a power output of 110 horsepower (82 kW). An additional twenty buses were delivered in 1931, with five of the buses equipped with two engines. The new buses also had separate entry and exit doors. Another twenty buses were delivered in 1932. Line 22 was established in October 1929 between Sagene and Oslo East Station, and Line 23 from Torshov via Sagene to Majorstuen. The latter ran partially parallel to Line 20.

On 18 January 1931, the Bus Ring was established as an extension of Line 20 in both directions, so it ran from Frogner via Majorstuen, Sagene, Torshov, Rodeløkka, Grünerløkka, Kampen to Tøyen. In January 1934, Oslo Sporveier started building their own bus in cooperation with Strømmen. It featured hydraulic transmission, it lacked gears and a clutch, and had the motor under the floor. Being built out of aluminum, it weighed 5,080 kilograms (11,200 lb), allowing reduced fuel and rubber consumption. Christened Flodhest (meaning hippopotamus), 70 units were serial produced from 1936 to 1939, and remained in service until 1958.

In 1931, the company sent an application for concession to operate a trolleybus from the city limited on Trondheimsveien to Grorud. The route, Line 30, was being operated by Ingeniør M. O. Schøyens Bilcentraler. Oslo Sporveier argued that a trolleybus would give better service, but the application was rejected, as it was sufficient improvement to terminate Schøyen Bilcentraler's concession. Later the plans were changed to the route would terminate at Majorstuen, and then at Skøyen. In 1937, a new application was sent to establish a trolleybus route, this time because of the shortage in fuel. From 1939, Oslo Sporveier was given a 60& rationing on gasoline.

In 1939, a Flodhest was built as a trolleybus and sent to Drammen for operation on their trolleybus network. It returned to Oslo and was put into service on a new trolleybus route, Line 17 from Rodeløkka to Nordre Åsen, from 15 December 1940. The route was 1,600 meters (5,200 ft) long and cost NOK 0.05. It remained in use until 21 August 1944 and ran using the single bus. On 5 December 1943, Line 21, from Carl Berners plass to Skillebekk, was opened as a trolleybus, with 11 buses being used on the route. From 1944, it was the only bus route being run by Oslo Sporveier. The same year, the Norwegian resistance blew up the garage at Bjølsen, which was being used to manufacture parts for the German Messerschmitt Bf 109 aircraft.

From 1947 to 1949, Oslo Sporveier took deliver of 50 trolleybuses, with electrical equipment from Vickers, which could take 75 passengers. New trolleybus routes were also established. These included Line 20 from Galgeberg to Majorstuen, and Line 23 from Bjølsen to Linnassgate, both from 17 January 1949. From 11 June 1950, the latter became part of a new Line 18, from Bjølsen to Ekeberg Hageby. The final trolleybus route was Line 24, from Tåsen to Kirkegaten, which opened on 20 February 1955.

In 1948, Oslo Sporveier took over the bus routes operated by Wicktor Ruud to Riskløkka and Økernbråten. In 1947 and 1948, Oslo Sporveier took delivery of twenty Scania-Vabis B 22 buses, with capacity for 70 passengers, and in 1948 and 1948 fourteen diesel buses built by Hønefoss Karosserifabrikk (Høka) on Leyland chassis were delivered. A further thirty Leyland-buses built by Strømmen were delivered from 1949 to 1951. From 1 February 1953, Oslo Sporveier took over the bus services operated by Ekebergbanen. The following year, Line 23 was established along Ring 3.

Delivery of the first fifteen Leyland Worldmaster took place in 1956, and with later deliveries they would dominate the fleet until 1968. In 1960, the city council decided to gradually close the tramway. The first two lines, the Kampen Line and the Vippetangen Line, were both closed the same year, and the two routes established by Line 29, from Kampen via the East Station to Studenterlunden, and Line 27 from Nydalen via Vippetangen to Skillebekk. In June 1962, the tram connection between the Sinsen Line and the Grünerløkka–Torshov Line was closed. On 24 June 1962, Line 24 was converted from trolleybus to diesel bus, and on 24 June 1963 the same happened with Line 18. On 17 October 1966, Sagene Ring of the tramway was closed and replaced by Line 17 from Sagene to the East Station. On 17 October 1966, the last trolleybus ran on Line 21, which was also taken over by diesel buses.

On 12 September 1966, Line 0, the Center Ring, started running as a circle through the city center. It ran every six minutes both east and west from Grønlands torg. Month passes were not valid on the route, and the line had 3,000 daily passengers. It was terminated from 18 June 1967. The route was served using Büssing Senator 12 and Leyland Panther. From 23 June 1968, the Vålerenga Line was closed and replaced by Line 17, which was extended from the East Station to Vålerenga. From 29 October 1967, the route was extended to Helsfyr, when the part of the Lambertseter Line was converted to metro. The last trolleybus service, one Line 20, ran on 23 June 1968.

All lines, except Line 20, had the conductor removed from 30 March 1968. The preamble was the delivery of Senator 12 buses from Büssing, which started in 1964. In addition, the company took delivery of Leyland Panther buses. The two models had been bought to compare them, and Büssing was preferred. Later orders included the Büssing Präfekt 12 and 13D and had a power output of 116 kilowatts (156 hp). Until 1978, Oslo Sporveier almost exclusively order Büssing buses, with the exception of six Scania CR 110 M in 1972, twenty-five Scania CR 111 M in 1974, and nineteen MAN SL 200 in 1972 and 1973, and a further twenty-five in 1976.

In November 1977, Oslo Sporveier bought De Blå Omnibusser and its 24 buses, which was based at Alnabru. In 1978, after pressure from Norwegian manufacturers through the press, Oslo Sporveier bought its first Norwegian-built busses, six Volvo B59 in 1978, built at Vestfold Bil- og Karosserifabrikk (VKB), and following year seven Volvo B10M buses. In 1980, the company tested several articulated buses, and chose ten VBK-built Volvo B10M buses with delivery in June and July 1981. They were put into service on Line 20. From 1982, Grefsen Depot was no longer used for buses, and became a depot solely for trams. In 1983, VKB filed for bankruptcy, and Oslo Sporveier started buying their buses from Arna Bruk Karosseriffabrikk, who delivered the first series of nine articulated B10M buses that year. By 1985, Arna had delivered another ten articulated buses and thirteen non-articulated buses, the latter based on Volvo B10R. The same year, Oslo Sporveier also took delivery of ten MAN SL200s.

Starting on 21 November 1986, Oslo Sporveier introduced night buses. They ran from Strotinget and Jernbanetorget, and consisted of four routes, one westwards, one northwards, one eastwards and one southwards. Each service ran once an hour in each direction, with clockwise and counter-clockwise routes running every half-hour. Month passes were not valid, the bus cost NOK and ran with departures from 01:30 04:00. The service required nine buses and gave 420 passengers on Fridays and 830 on Saturdays. On 7 March 1987, Stortinget Station of the Oslo Metro opened, and many of the bus routes were moved. A new Line 25 was created, from Majorstuen to Stovner. From 27 March, a circle bus route was established from Tveita Station on the Furuset Line of the metro, along Sigrud Undsets vei.

From March 1991, Oslo Sporveier took into use four propane-fueled buses from Arna. One 5 July, the first routes in Oslo were taken over by public service obligation contracts. The first were Line 36 from Maridalen via Kjelsås to Torshov, and Line 56 from Solemskogen and Grefsenkollen to Torshov. Both were operated with mini buses by Oslo Taxi. From 10 October 1991, the bus division started a service line for the elderly and disabled in the areas Haugerud, Tveita Oppsal, Bøler, Bogerud and Skullerud. From 7 July 1992, Oslo Sporveier received two Ontario Orion II25 buses for these routes, which had experienced a 90% load factor. Additional service routes were established on 1 December 1992 and on 10 May 1993. The same year, the company received its first low-floor buses.
