= Østensjø =

Borough of Oslo, Norway

Bydel Østensjø
- Borough
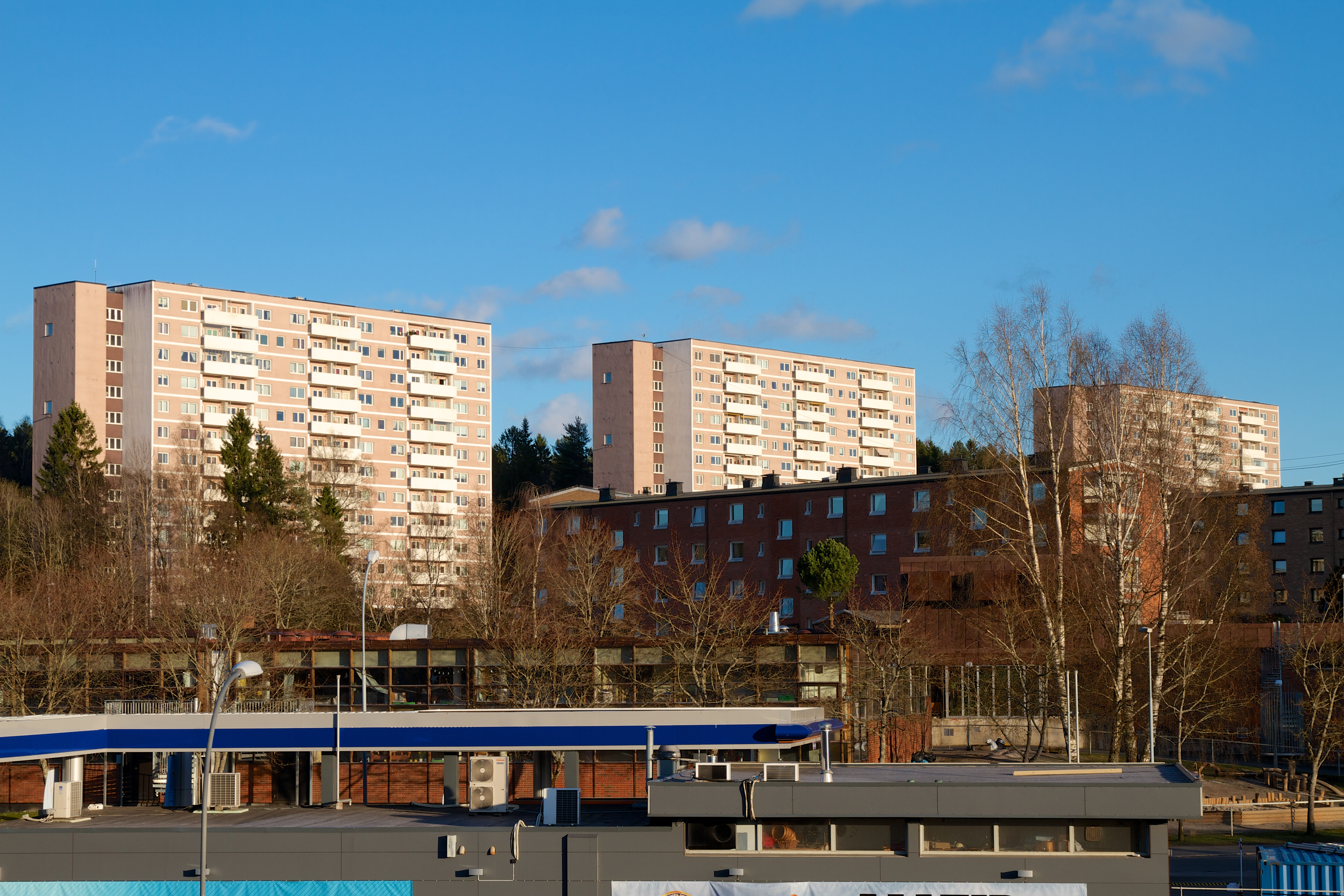

- Coat of arms

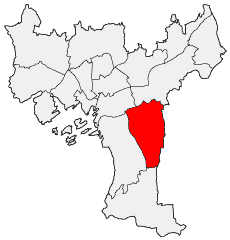
- Coordinates: 59°53′20″N 10°50′01″E
- Country: Norway
- City: Oslo

Area
  - Total: 12.24 km^{2} (4.73 sq mi)

Population (2020)
  - Total: 50,806
  - Density: 4,151/km^{2} (10,750/sq mi)
- Time zone: UTC+1 (CET)
  - Summer (DST): UTC+2 (CEST)
- ISO 3166 code: NO-030113
- Website: bydel-ostensjo.oslo.kommune.no

Østensjø (pronounced [ˈœ̂sːtn̩ˌʂøː]) is a borough of the city of Oslo, Norway.

The borough is in the southeastern part of Oslo. It is well known for its proximity to the forested area of Østmarka, a popular resort and hiking area for the citizens of Oslo and Lørenskog. Østensjø consists of the suburbs of Bøler, Abildsø, Bogerud, Skullerud, Ulsrud, Hellerud, Trasop, Oppsal and Manglerud, all located around Lake Østensjøvannet. The Østensjøvannet area has been a protected wildlife reserve since 1992.

Østensjø has traditionally been a Norwegian middle and working class borough, compared to the more immigrant populated boroughs in Oslo East End, like Alna, Grorud, Stovner and Søndre Nordstrand.

The club IL Manglerud Star which is known for ice hockey and football is located here.
