= Bøler =

Neighborhood in Oslo, Norway

Coordinates: 59°53′N 10°51′E

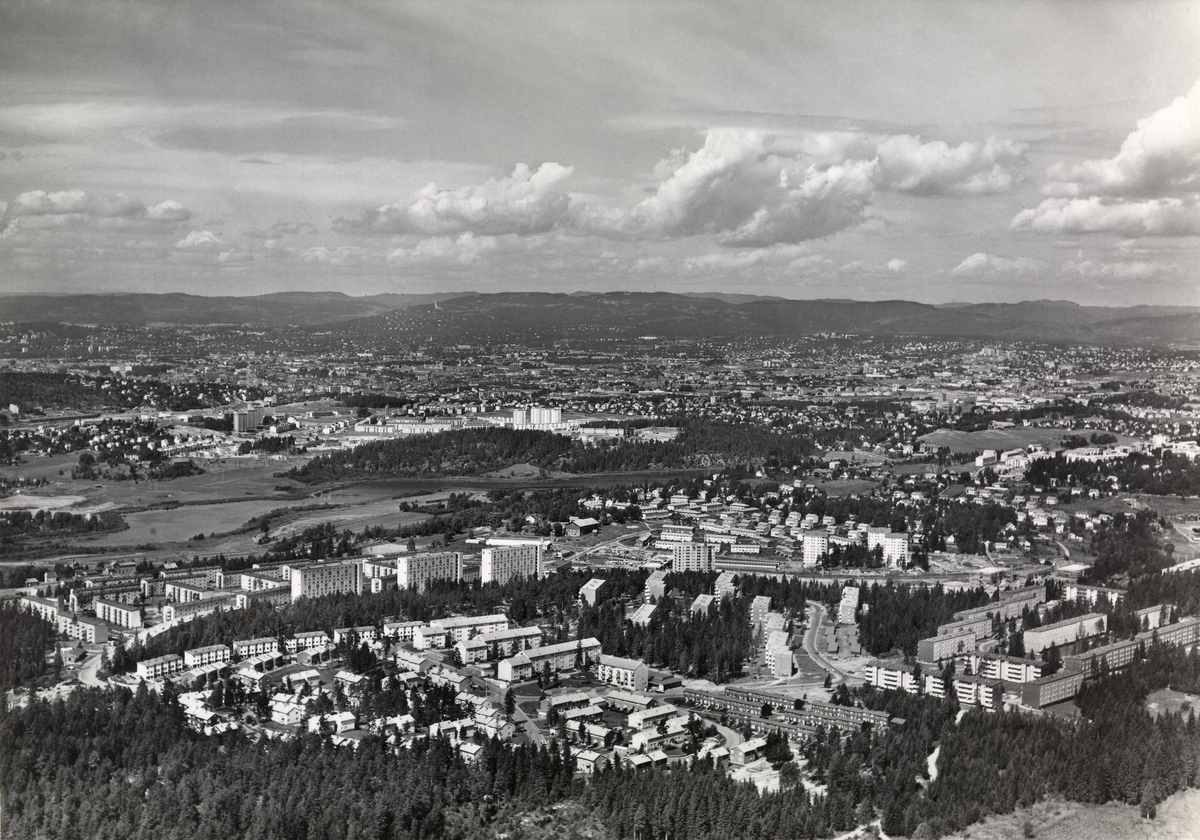
Aerial view, ca. 1985.

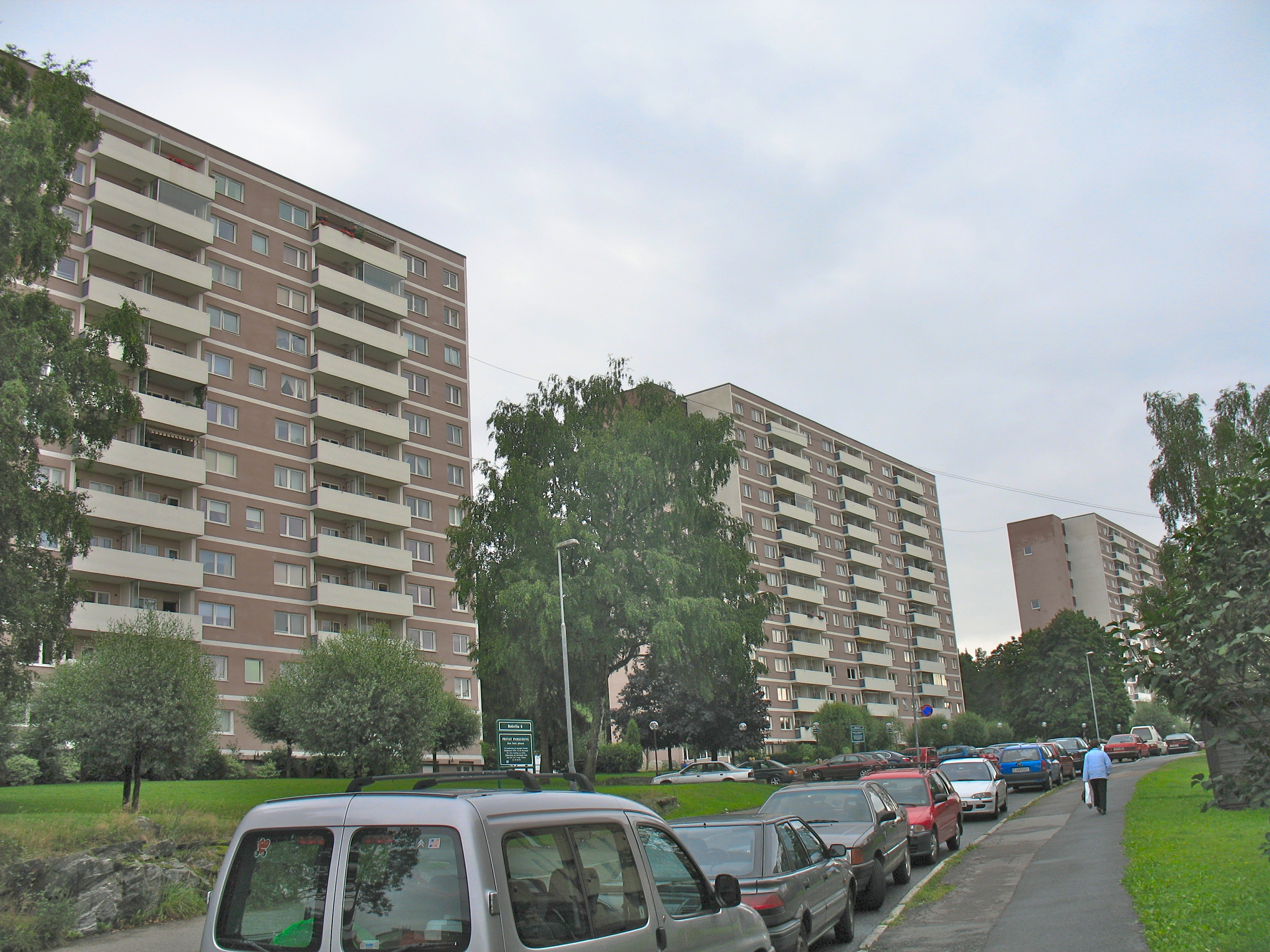
Tower blocks at Bøler. They won the Sundt Price for architecture in 1956–57.

Bøler is a south-eastern suburb of Oslo, Norway. It is one of the more picturesque areas of Oslo. Østmarka forest and lake Nøklevann are in its immediate vicinity. Infrastructure-wise, it has a shopping center , two elementary schools, a public bath, a library, a church and a stop on the Østensjøbanen metro line.

== History ==
The name Bøler comes from Old Norse bæl (farm). The area was mostly built up in the late 1950s, with high-rise buildings and smaller houses.

Bøler was a separate borough of the city of Oslo, Norway from the mid-1980s up to December 31, 2003, when it became part of the borough of Østensjø.

== Nearby locations ==
- Ulsrud
- Bogerud
- Østensjøvannet
- Abildsø
- Oppsal
- Skullerud
