= 1939–40 Norwegian Ice Hockey Championship season =

Sports season

The 1939–40 Norwegian Ice Hockey Championship season was the sixth season of ice hockey in Norway. 14 teams participated in the league, and Grane won the championship.

== Results ==
=== First round ===
- Grane
- Stabekk - Forward 3:1
- Bygdø - Ready 2:6
- B14 - Frisk 1:2
- Frogner - Holmen 1:3
- Gjøa - Furuset 0:4
- Strong - Heming 1:0
- Hasle

=== Second round ===
- Grane - Stabekk 5:1
- Ready - Frisk 4:3
- Holmen - Furuset 5:2
- Strong - Hasle 0:2

=== Semifinals ===
- Grane - Ready 4:0
- Holmen - Hasle 1:3

=== Final ===
- Grane - Hasle 1:0
