= Hellerud =

Former borough of Oslo, Norway

Coordinates: 59°54′39″N 10°50′47″E

Hellerud was a borough of the city of Oslo, Norway up to January 1, 2004, when it became part of the new borough of Alna. It is also a traditional neighbourhood located within this area to the south of Tveita and Haugerud and north of Oppsal. It borders on the forest of Østmarka.
