= Norwegian National Road 159 =

Road in Norway

Coordinates: 59°55′46″N 10°58′05″E

National Road 159
- Bokmål: Riksvei 159; Nynorsk: Riksveg 159

Route information
- Length: 11.4 km (7.1 mi)

Location
- Country: Norway

Highway system
- Roads in Norway; National Roads; County Roads

Riksvei 159 (Rv159) is a four-laned motorway between Karihaugen in Oslo and Lillestrøm. The road is 11.4 km, of which 1.7 km is in Oslo and 9.7 km is in Akershus.
