= Ellingsrud Church =

- Ellingsrud kirke
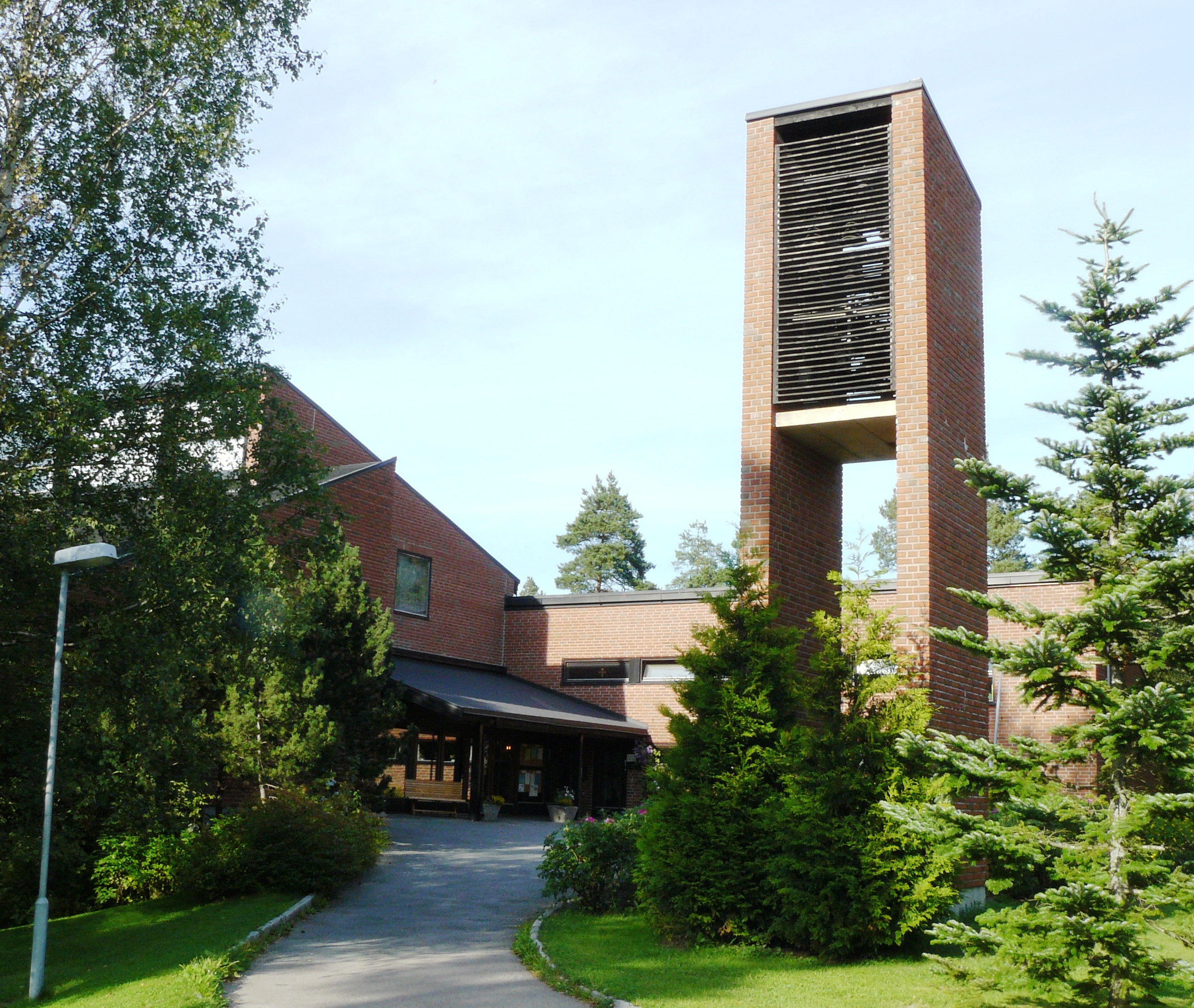
- Ellingsrud Church
- 59°56′13.344″N 10°54′59.378″E
- Location: Dragonstien 18, Ellingsrud, Oslo,
- Country: Norway
- Denomination: Church of Norway
- Churchmanship: Evangelical Lutheran
- Website: https://kirken.no

History
- Status: Parish church
- Consecrated: 1981

Architecture
- Functional status: Active

Specifications
- Capacity: 550
- Materials: Brick

Administration
- Diocese: Diocese of Oslo
- Deanery: Østre Aker
- Parish: Ellingsrud og Furuset

Ellingsrud Church is a church center in Oslo, Norway. Ellingsrud Church was consecrated in 1981.

== History ==
The church was built according to drawings by architect Erik Anker.

The altarpiece is painted by Ingjerd Pettersen-Hagh. The altarpiece is divided into three parts, and has a painting depicting the women at the grave of Christ, the risen Christ and Christ washing the disciples' feet.

The church organ has 17 voices, made by Ryde & Berg in 1994.

The church bells in a separate bell tower from Olsen Nauen Bell Foundry were made in 1981. There are 12 bells in the carillon, of which the two largest are also used for regular ringing.

In the building is also a parish hall and the church's offices. In the basement of the church is the "Culture Cellar", an exhibition and sale for local artists and craftsmen.
