= Abildsø =

Neighborhood located in Oslo, Norway

Coordinates: 59.88°N 10.82°E

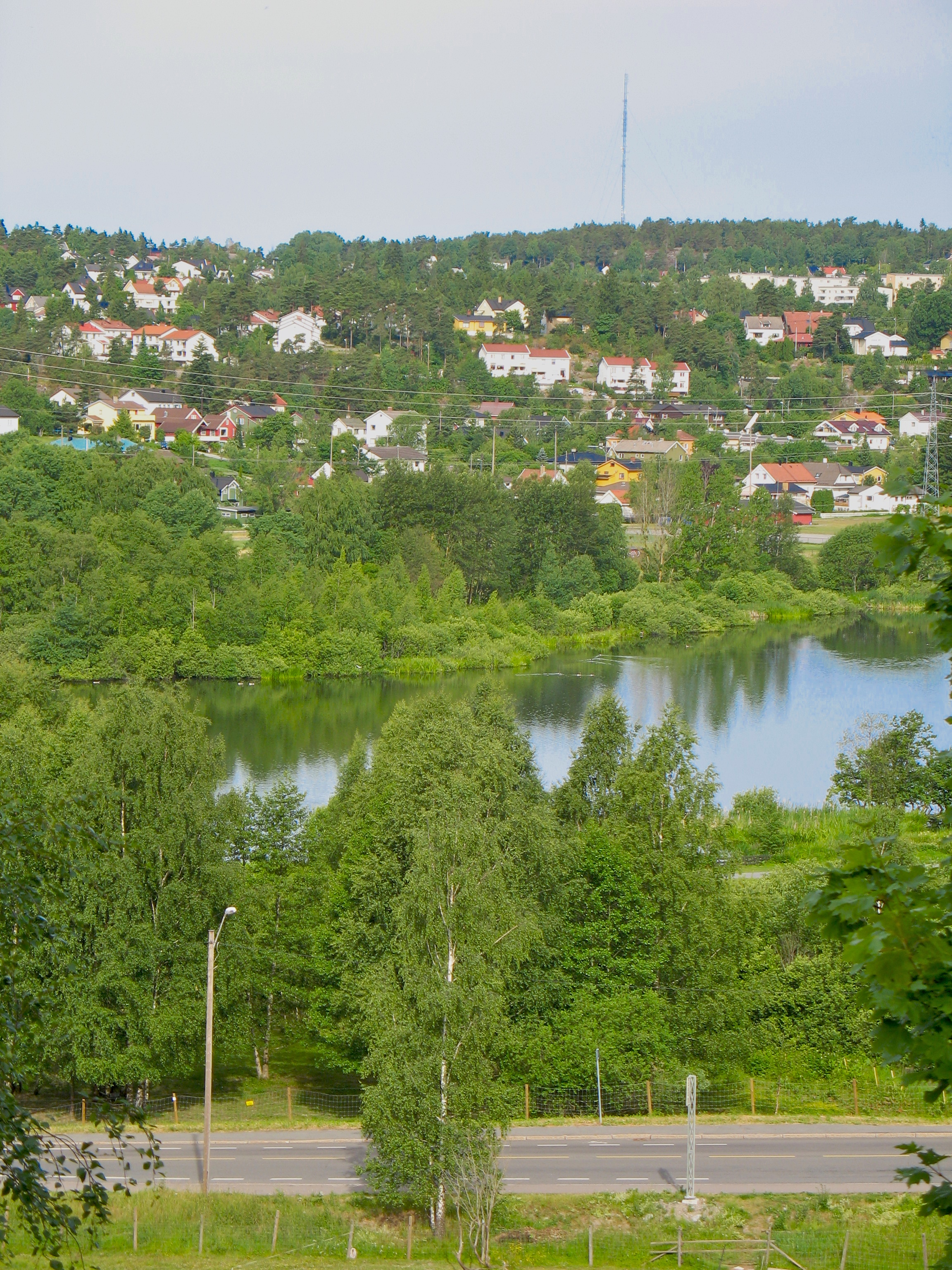
Østensjøvannet in front of Abildsø

Abildsø is a neighborhood in the borough Østensjø in Oslo, Norway. It is located south of Manglerud and Ryen, east of Lambertseter, north of Langerud and east of Bøler the lake Østensjøvannet. During the late 1800s, Abildsø was the site of Minna og Frederik Husgjerningsskole, a school for young farm girls. The school was operated by education pioneer, Minna Wetlesen and her husband Frederik Wetlesen

== The name ==
The neighborhood is named after the old farm Abildsø (Abildsø gård). The first element is the genitive case of apaldr m 'wild apple tree', the last element is vin f 'meadow'.
