= Keep-it Technologies =

Technology company

Keep-it Technologies AS
- Type: Private limited company
- Industry: Biotechnology
- Founded: December 4, 2001
- Headquarters: Oslo, Norway
- Key people: Kristen Aksel Hovland (CEO)
- Number of employees: 22
- Website: www.keep-it.no/en

Keep-it Technologies AS (formerly TimeTemp) is a spin-off technology company from The Norwegian University of Life Sciences (NMBU) in Ås, just outside Oslo in Norway. Keep-it Technologies has offices and manufacturing facilities at Furuset in Oslo. The company is primarily engaged in research and technology development of a shelf-life indicator for temperature-sensitive products, such as food, pharmaceuticals and chemicals. The company's research efforts have received financial support from the Research Council of Norway’s Food Programme, as well as from Innovation Norway’s industrial R&D scheme (IFU).

== Business ==
Keep-it Technologies has developed a time and temperature indicator (TTI) that shows the actual remaining shelf life of products, which is significantly better than the traditional static date stamp. It is based on temperature over time, and each indicator is tailored to the products shelf life profile. The technology behind the indicator has been developed and verified at the University, before a working prototype was finally developed. Keep-it Technologies has patented the indicator in a number of countries, including the USA.

Keep-it Technologies’ shelf-life indicator comprises two small chambers with different ingredients that react and change colour depending on time and temperature. A blue bar moves gradually from left to right and eventually disappears. The blue bar moves slow at low temperatures and faster as the temperature increases. The indicator is attached as a self-adhesive label to the packaging by the food producer. It monitors the time and temperature the packages is exposed to from production, during transport, at the retailer, and in the consumer's own fridge. In this way the device gives more correct indication of remaining shelf life (days left) than traditional date-stamping, because it takes into account the actual temperature to which the individual food package has been exposed.

Benefits by using the indicator: Reduce food waste for both retailer & consumer, increase food safety & quality, and gain control over the whole cold chain, and reduce customer complaints.

== History ==
- 2000: Four scientists from what was then the Agricultural University of Norway (NLH), now the Norwegian University of Life Sciences (UMB) had the idea of replacing traditional date-stamping with something that can give a more correct indication of remaining shelf life for temperature sensitive products, such as food and pharmaceuticals.
- 2001: The fundamental principles for a shelf-life indicator were verified in the laboratory. The company TimeTemp AS, now Keep-it Technologies, was founded in 2001 to develop the technology into a commercial product.
- 2003: TimeTemp comes in second place in DNB’s national innovation competition.
- 2003-2007: The technology is tested and developed in the university's laboratories, and a working laboratory prototype is created. Keep-it Technologies is granted a patent in a number of different countries, including the US, Canada, Australia and New Zealand.
- 2007-2009: With support from the Research Council of Norway, Keep-it Technologies initiates an R&D project to develop the technology from laboratory prototype to an industrial prototype, and test it on real products through a professional cold chain.
- 2010-2011: The company raises new investment capital and initiates an IFU project that develops the first consumer version of the indicator. The indicator is tested on the first products in the Norwegian grocery market.
- 2012: Keep-it indicator is commercialized in Norway with the Norwegian retailer, Rema 1000.
- 2018: Keep-it has indicators on 30 different fresh products at Rema 1000, Kolonial.no and Oslo University Hospital. Has sold over 70 million indicators to now.

== Articles ==
- Reduce waste with shelf-life indicator for food, The Research Council of Norway, The Food Programme, 1 September 2010
- Less Waste With Shelf-Life Indicator for Food, Science Daily, 1 September 2010
- TimeTemp's shelf-life indicator for food will help Norwegian retailers reduce waste, News Medical, 4 September 2010
- Intelligent shelf life indicator could slash food waste, FoodProduction daily.com, 7 September 2010
- TimeTemp bring waste solution with intelligent shelf-life indicator in-Pharma Technologist.com, 9 September 2010
- TimeTemp develops smart label, Bakers Journal, 15 November 2010
