= Furuset kulturpark =

Park in Oslo, Norway

Coordinates: 59°56′34.091″N 10°53′22.085″E

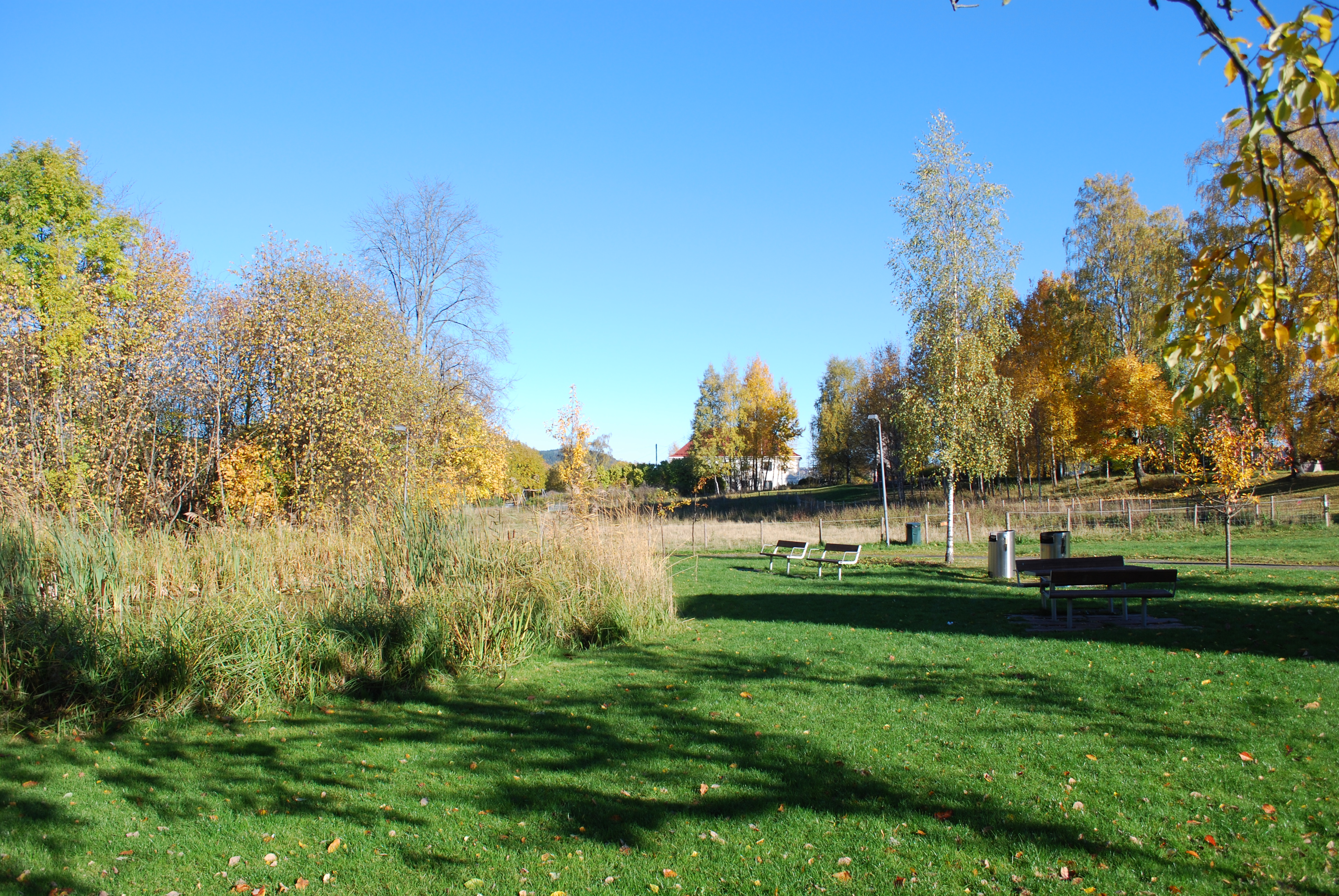
Furuset kulturpark

Furuset kulturpark is a park in the neighborhood of Furuset in Oslo, Norway. It opened in May 2009 at a cost of NOK 5.6 million.

The 15.2-acre park is operated by the municipality and is used for recreational purposes, with a pedestrian and bicycle paths and a recreational area. Furuset Church (Furuset Kirke) is in the vicinity. In the park there is a field of flowers and flowering trees and a pond. In the summer months, goats from Nordre Lindeberg 4H-farm are let out to graze in a paddock in the park.
