= Helsfyr-Sinsen =

Former borough of Oslo, Norway

Coordinates: 59°54′51″N 10°47′55″E

Helsfyr-Sinsen was a borough of the city of Oslo, Norway, from 1988 to January 1, 2004, when it was split up and merged into Alna and Gamle Oslo boroughs. It consisted of the neighborhoods Helsfyr, Teisen, Etterstad, Keyserløkka, Lille Tøyen, Valle, Løren, Carl Berners plass, Rosenhoff and Sinsen.
