= Wetlesen =

Wetlesen is a Norwegian surname. Notable people with the surname include:

- Minna Wetlesen (1821–1891), Norwegian educator, teacher, and author
- Wilhelm Wetlesen (1871–1925), Norwegian painter and illustrator
