= Furuset Aktivitetspark =

Park in Oslo, Norway

Coordinates: 59.9404°N 10.8935°E

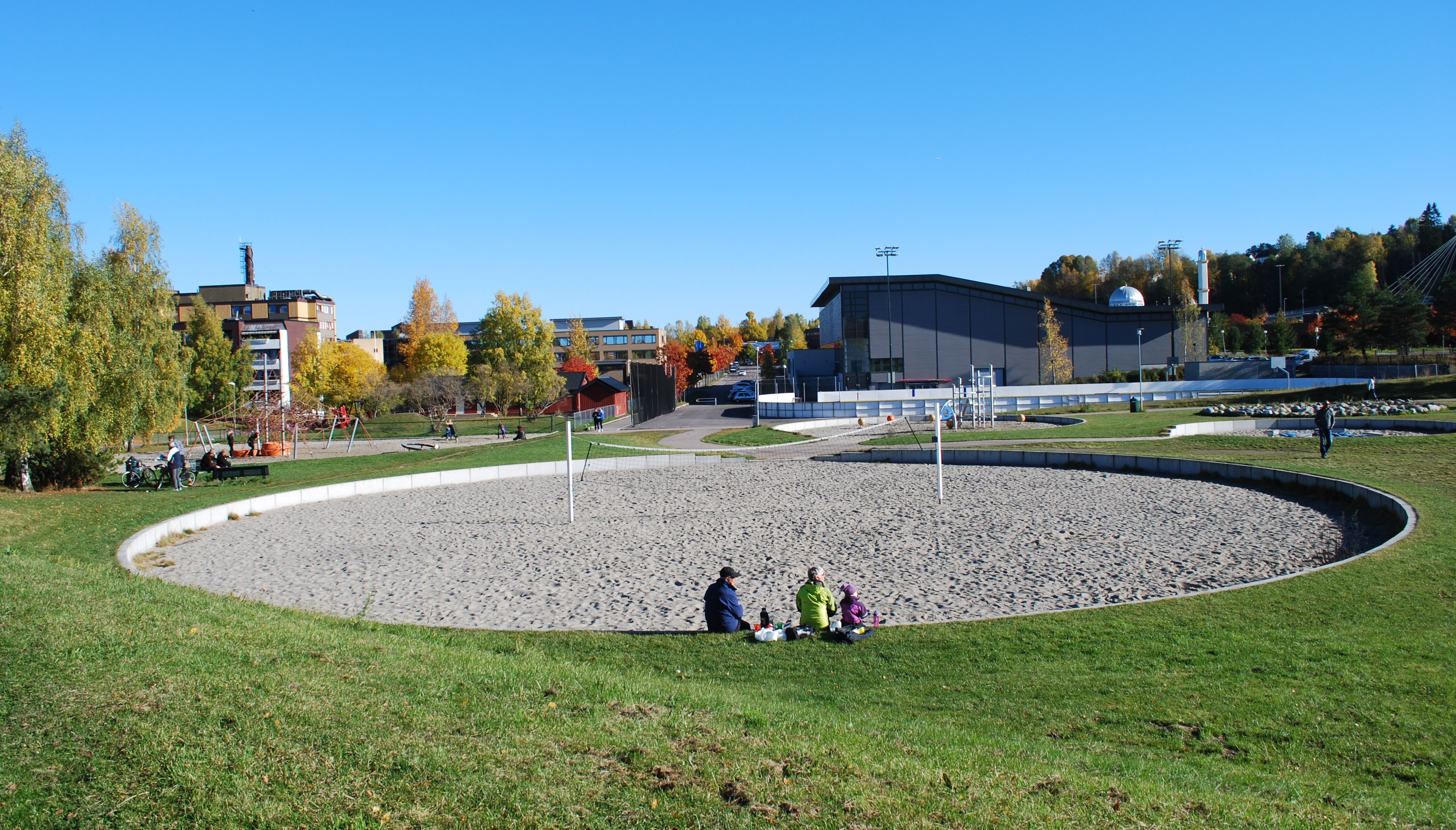
Furuset Aktivitetspark: the beach volley court

Furuset Aktivitetspark (literally Furuset Activity Park) is a park in the neighborhood of Furuset in Oslo, Norway. It opened in November 2008. It was created as part of an initiative to develop the Grorud Valley under the auspices of Oslo Municipality and the national authorities.

The park is located less than 200 m (660 ft) southwest of the Furuset Shopping Centre (Furuset Senter). Extending over 25.4 acres (10.3 ha), it is operated by the municipality for recreational purposes. Facilities include climbing nets, roundabouts, fitness equipment, a 40 x 60 metre (130 x 200 ft) soccer pitch with artificial grass, a beach volleyball court, a gravel running track, a circular labyrinth, and a playground. In winter there is a skating rink where it is possible to rent ice skates.
