= Rustad =

Rustad may refer to:

- Clare Rustad (born 1983), professional football player, who plays for Toronto Lady Lynx
- Fritz Rustad (1852–1930), Norwegian civil and royal servant
- John Rustad, BC Conservative Member of the Legislative Assembly of the Canadian province of British Columbia
- Michael Rustad, law professor at Suffolk University Law School, an author and television commentator
- Tine Rustad Kristiansen (born 1980), Norwegian handball player
- Tommy Rustad (born 1968), Norwegian auto racing driver

== See also ==
- Rustad, Minnesota
- Rustad Bay, small bay indenting the southwest side of Annenkov Island, off the south coast of South Georgia
- Rustad Knoll, rounded, snow-topped elevation (365 m) which surmounts the south shore of Bouvetøya immediately east of Cato Point
