= Karihaugen =

Neighbourhood in Ellingsrud, Oslo, Norway

Coordinates: 59.9347°N 10.9265°E

Karihaugen is a neighbourhood in the residential area of Ellingsrud in Oslo, Norway. The development of the area started in the 1970s. Karihaugen consists mainly of residential buildings in various shapes and sizes. Karihaugen also has a tiny industrial area (Karihaugen industrial area), which borders to the much bigger Visperud industrial area in Lørenskog.
