= Trosterud =

Neighborhood in Oslo, Norway

Coordinates: 59°56′N 10°52′E

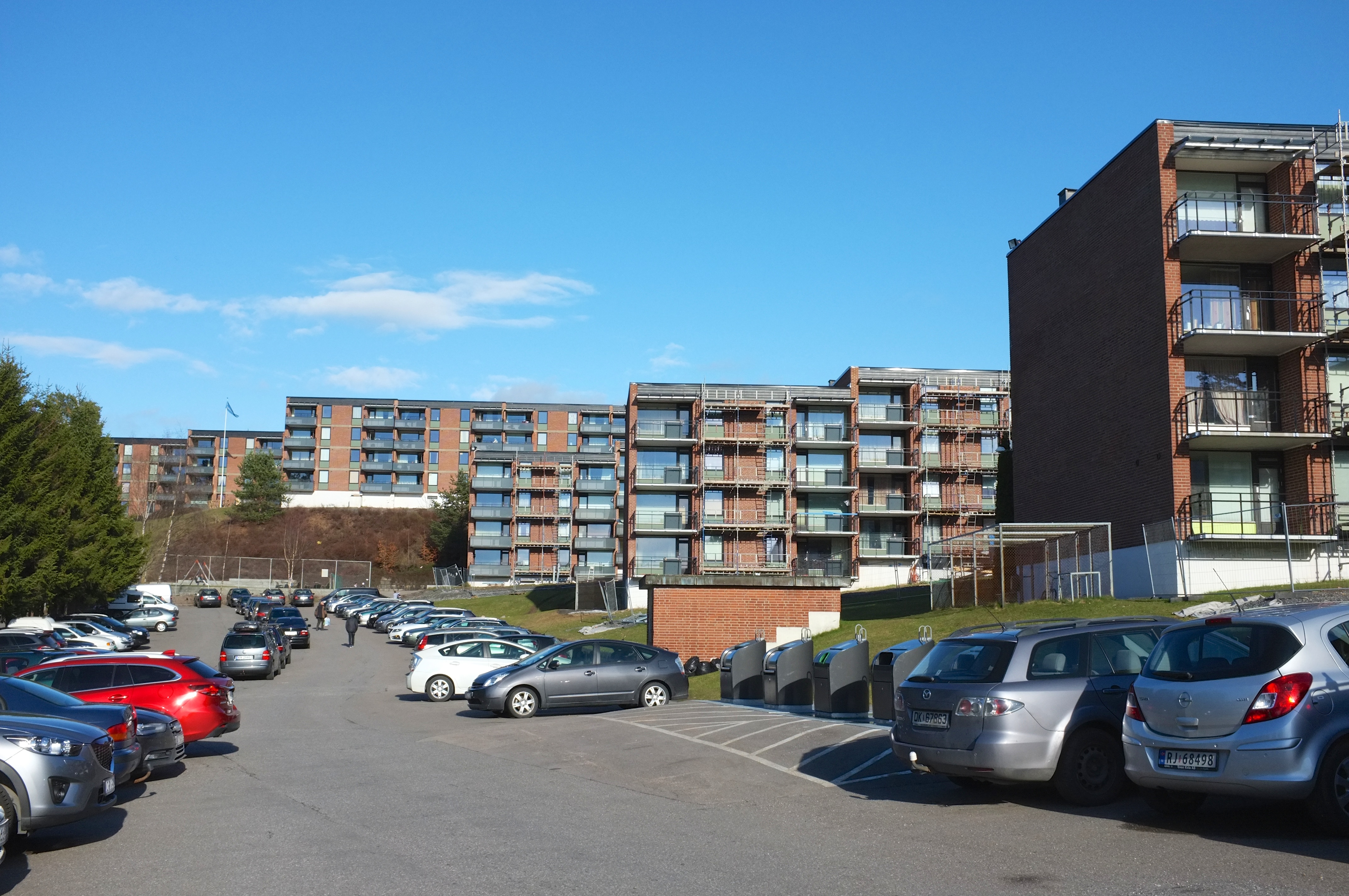
Johan Castbergs Road

Trosterud is a neighborhood in Alna borough in Oslo, Norway.

The place is named after Trosterud farm. The farm is preserved and is located in Dr. Dedichens vei.

Trosterud was developed in the 1960s and 1970s, but also had some small-house buildings before that. During the same period, Trosterud Centre was completed. Today, the centre consists of a Kiwi shop, kiosk (MIX), youth club, medical centre, and a physical institute. The centre's façade was refurbished in the autumn of 2013, and the youth club reopened in January 2014. The outdoor area has been given new lighting and planting.

Trosterud school was established in 1969, and Trosterud station at Furusetbanen in 1974. The school closest to Trosterud is Lutvann School.

Dr. Dedichens vei, which cuts through the area from Tvetenveien up to lake Lutvann, is named after Henrik Dedichen, who built a mental hospital at Trosterud in early 1901. Henrik Dedichen founded and ran "Dr. Dedichens privatasyl" at Trosterud in Østre Aker from 1901 to 1933, and worked for reforms in the field of mental health care and the legislation surrounding it. Henrik Dedichen founded and ran "Dr. Dedichens privatasyl" at Trosterud in Østre Aker from 1901 to 1933.

The asylum itself is preserved, along with the old residence and the remains of a formal garden with a small water mirror. The accommodation is currently used as a kindergarten called Nordre Trosterud Gård barnehage. Several sculptures have been deployed around the "villa".

Today, the neighborhood is known for its diverse population, with a mixture of different nationalities and ethnicities.

Trosterud is served by Oslo T-bane's Trosterud station with four departures every hour. The ride to downtown Oslo takes about 17 minutes. There are also two bus services to Trosterud.
