= Rosenhoff =

Neighbourhood of Oslo, Norway

59°55′50.29″N 10°46′30.36″E

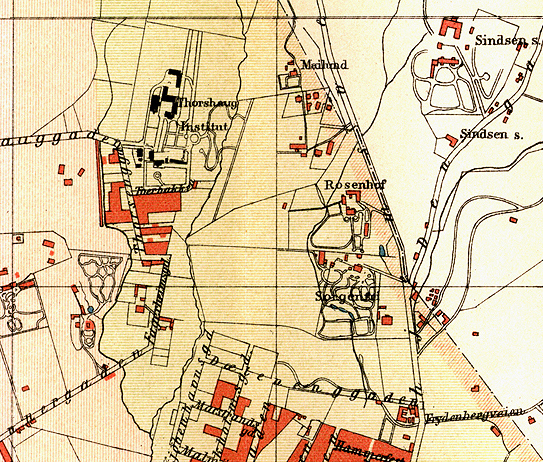
Map from 1887 showing watercourses dividing the areas of Kristiania into districts in 1878. Along the south, Dælenenga is being built.

Rosenhoff is a neighbourhood of Helsfyr, Oslo. It lies north of Carl Berners plass and Rodeløkka, south and east of the park area of Torshovdalen, and west of Sinsenbyen. The neighborhood is built on the site of the former Rosenhoff locks, is triangular, and borders Mailundveien to the northwest, Rosenhoffsgata to the south, and Trondheimsveien to the east. The tram also runs through this part of Trondheimsveien, and there is a tram stop at Rosenhoff.

The buildings were built by the municipality after a fire in 1913. The population was 1505 as of 2009.
