= Rustad Knoll =

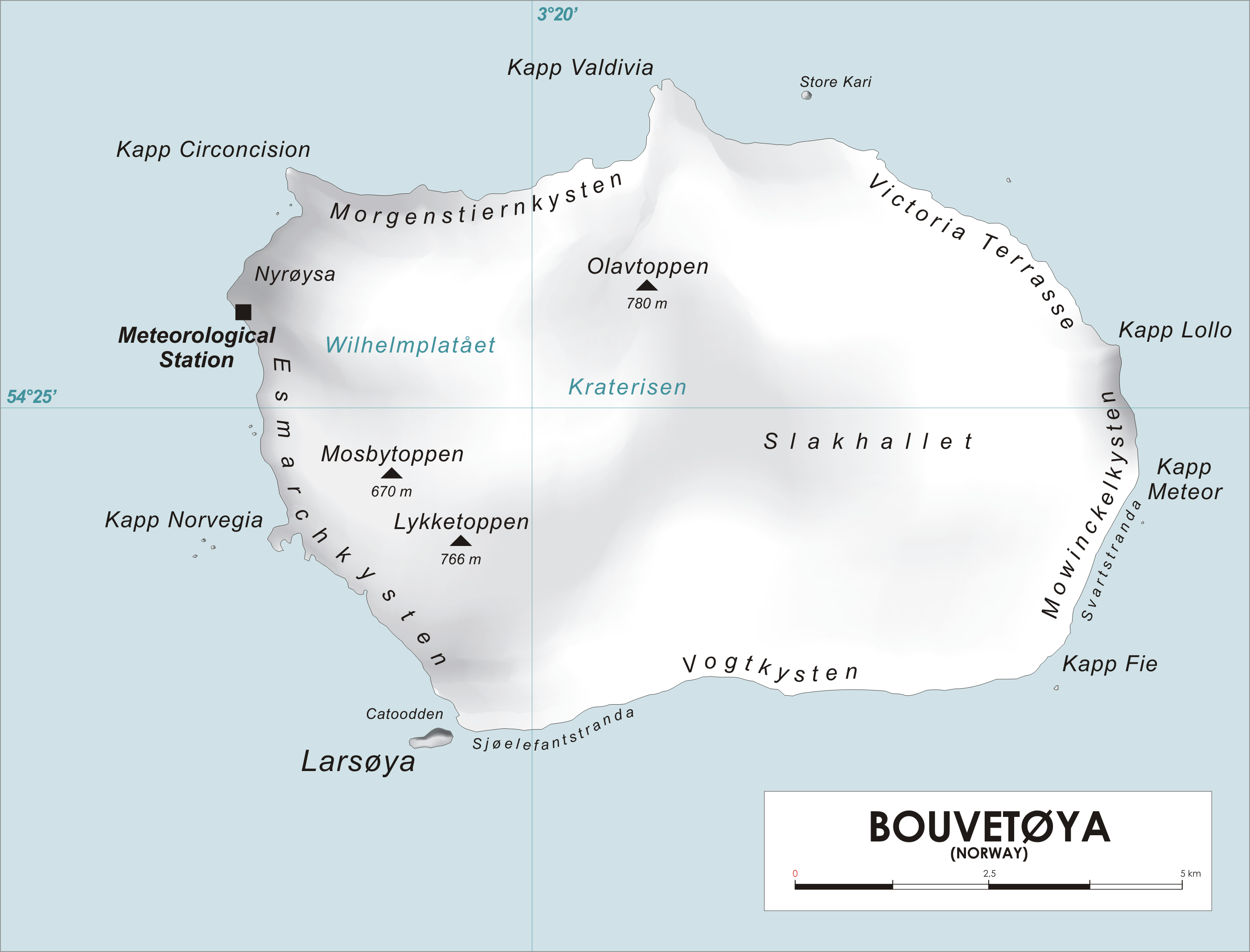
Map of Bouvetøya

Rustad Knoll (54°28′S 3°23′E) is a rounded, snow-topped elevation (365 m) which surmounts the south shore of the island of Bouvetøya immediately east of Cato Point. First charted in 1898 by a German expedition under Carl Chun. The knoll was recharted in December 1927 by the Norvegia expedition under Captain Harald Horntvedt. They named it for Ditlef Rustad who was in charge of the biological research of the expedition.
