= Furuset Church (Oslo) =

- Furuset kirke
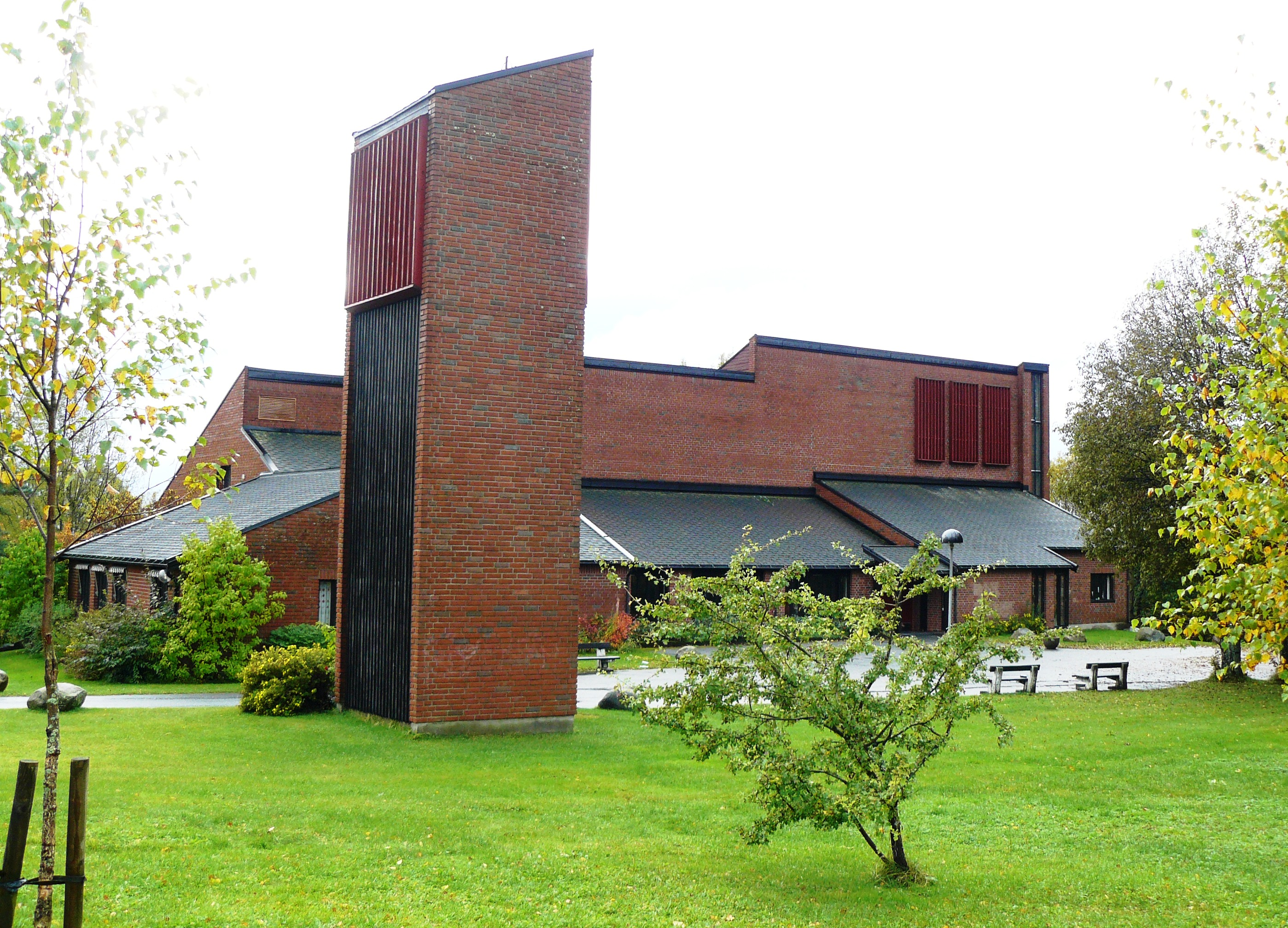
- Furuset Church
- 59°56′31.664″N 10°53′21.275″E
- Location: Ulsholtveien 37, Furuset, Oslo
- Country: Norway
- Denomination: Church of Norway
- Churchmanship: Evangelical Lutheran

History
- Status: Parish church

Architecture
- Functional status: Active
- Architect: Harald Hille
- Completed: 1980

Specifications
- Capacity: 600
- Materials: Brick

Administration
- Diocese: Diocese of Oslo
- Parish: Ellingsrud og Furuset

Furuset Church is a church that was consecrated in 1980. The church is located in the neighborhood of Furuset in Oslo, Norway. In the same area was a church in the Middle Ages, from which keys of iron were found, are preserved and placed in the present church.

The church is built in brick and has 600 seats spread over several rooms that can be joined or separated by sliding doors. Downstairs there is a meeting room. The altarpiece in the church room, made by Gunnar Torvund, is in wood with a Christ motif in bronze. It has carved biblical and religious motifs. The church organ, which has 18 voices, was built by organ builder Eystein Gangfløt in 1982.

The church has a steep roof and a separate bell tower of bricks and panels, where there are two church bells.

Furuset Church is listed by the Norwegian Directorate for Cultural Heritage.
