= Lavprisekspressen =

Norwegian intercity coach service

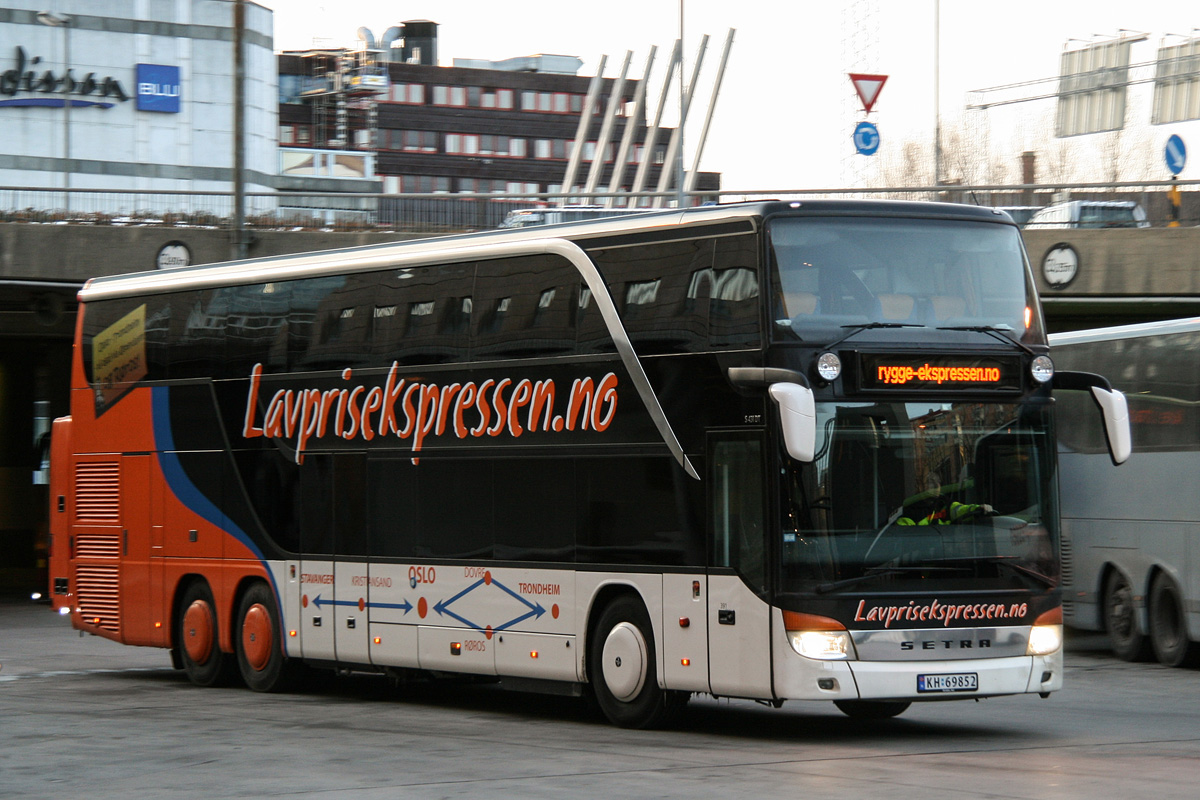
Setra S 431 DT of Lavprisekspressen

Lavprisekspressen is a Norwegian coach bus service operating out of Oslo to the cities of Trondheim and Stavanger. The service is operated by Unibuss Ekspress AS, a subsidiary of Unibuss AS. Both routes have one or two departures per day. The main coaches are the Setra S 431 DT double-decker buses.
