= Alna =

Borough of Oslo, Norway

Bydel Alna
- Borough
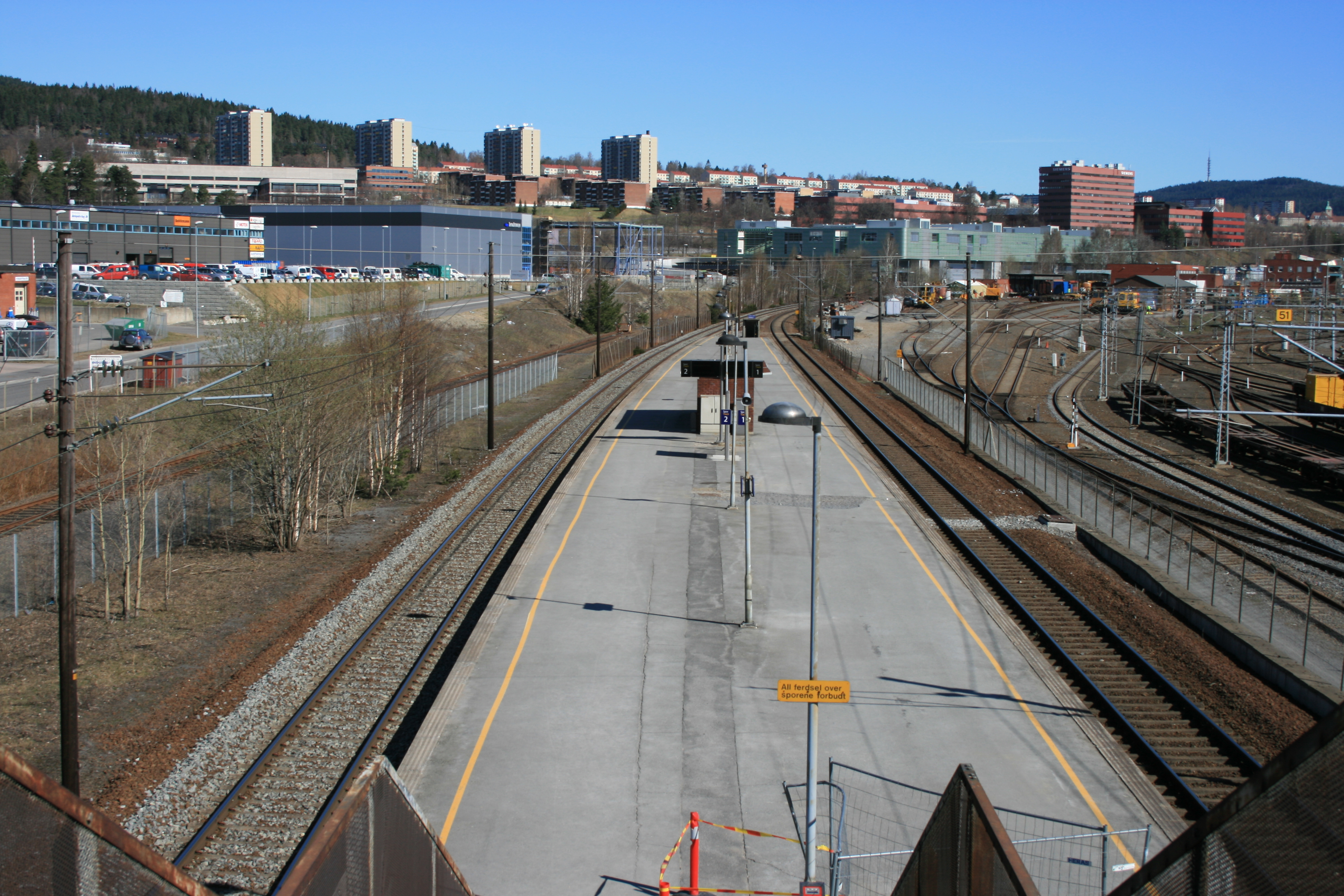

- Coat of arms

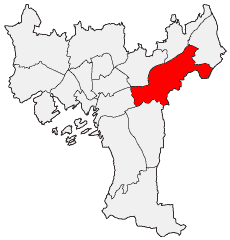
- Country: Norway
- City: Oslo
- District: Grorud Valley

Area
  - Total: 13.75 km^{2} (5.31 sq mi)

Population (2020)
  - Total: 49,801
  - Density: 3,622/km^{2} (9,380/sq mi)
- Time zone: UTC+1 (CET)
  - Summer (DST): UTC+2 (CEST)
- ISO 3166 code: NO-030112
- Website: oslo.kommune.no/politikk-og-administrasjon/bydeler/bydel-alna

Alna is a borough of the city of Oslo, Norway. It is named after the River Alna, which flows through it.

The borough consists of the following neighborhoods:

- Alnabru
- Ellingsrud
- Furuset
- Haugerud
- Hellerud
- Lindeberg
- Teisen
- Trosterud
- Tveita

In the Oslo borough reform in 2004, the borough Helsfyr-Sinsen was removed, and the neighborhoods Teisen and Bryn were included in Alna.

== Demographics ==
As of 1 January 2020 there were 49,801 people living in the borough. Of these, 24,943 (50.1%) were male. There were 1,495 immigrants from Western countries and 24,943 from Non-Western countries (50%). The countries from where most immigrants originated were Pakistan (5,060), Turkey (1,500), Sri Lanka (1,161), the former Yugoslavia (1,078), and Somalia (756). There were 641 births in the borough in 2018, and 341 deaths. The same year 6,875 people moved into the borough, while 6,767 moved out. In 2018, the average gross income for the borough was NOK 394,000, somewhat lower than the average for the city of NOK 529,400.

== Politics ==
As a borough of Oslo, Alna is governed by the city council of Oslo as well as its own borough council. The council leader is Mari Morken from the Labour Party and the deputy leader is Sunniva Bratsberg, of the Socialist Left Party. The Labour Party has the most seats. The 15 seats are distributed among the following political parties for the 2019-2023 term:

- 6 from the Labour Party (Arbeiderpartiet)
- 2 from the Progress Party (Fremskrittspartiet)
- 2 from the Conservative Party (Høyre)
- 2 from the Red Party (Rødt)
- 2 from the Socialist Left Party (Sosialistisk Venstreparti)
- 1 from the Green Party (Miljøpartiet de Grønne)

== Transport ==
The area is served by the Furuset Line of the Oslo Metro, which was constructed throughout the 1970s. All stations between Hellerud and Ellingsrudåsen are within Alna. It is also served by an assortment of bus lines part of Ruter's bus network. It is also served by Alna railway station, which is part of the Trunk Line running between Oslo S and Lillestrøm.
