= Lindern, Oslo =

Neighborhood in Oslo, Norway

Coordinates: 59°56′03″N 10°44′30″E

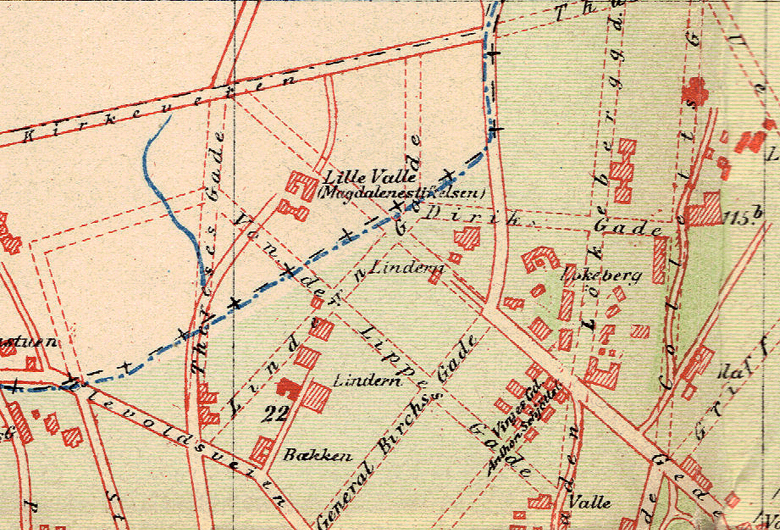
Map of Lindern, c.1900

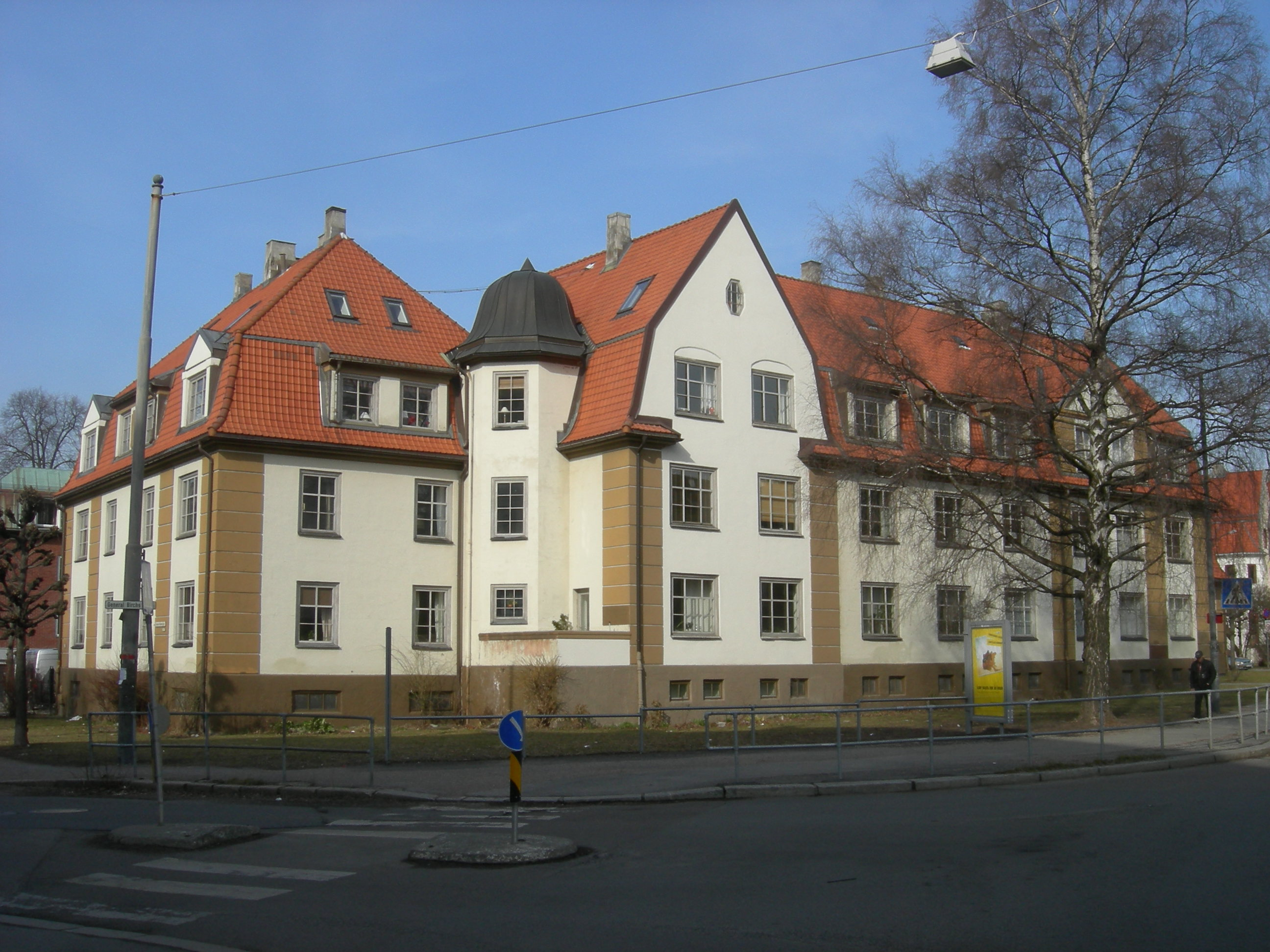
Housing in Lindern

Lindern is a neighborhood in the borough St. Hanshaugen in Oslo, Norway.

Originally farmland in the former municipality Aker, the southern part was incorporated into Christiania city in 1858 and the northern part in 1948. The Norwegian School of Veterinary Science is located at Lindern.
