= Manglerud =

Borough in Oslo, Norway

Coordinates: 59.89595°N 10.81278°E

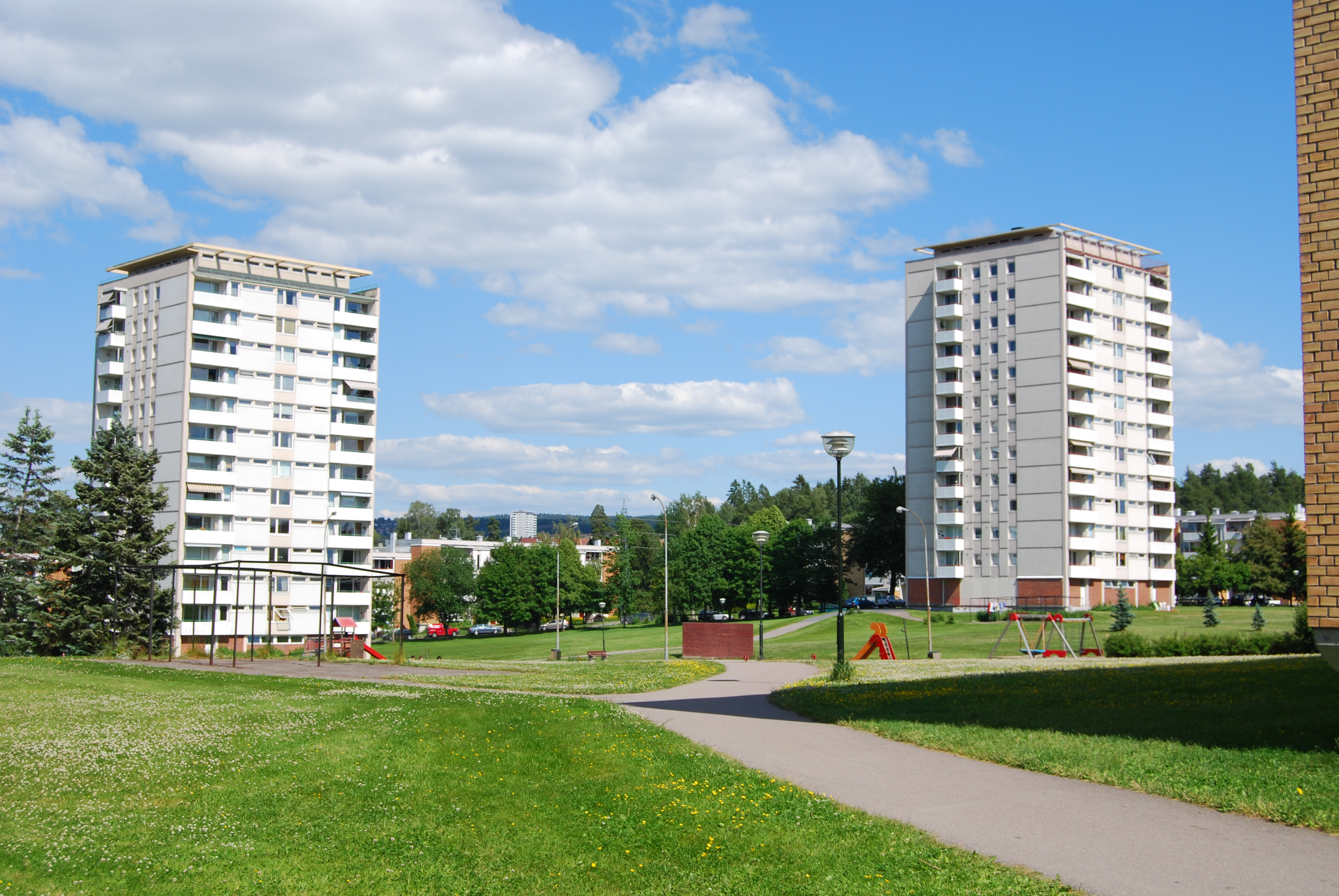
Tower blocks in Manglerud.

Manglerud is a borough in the Østensjø district of Oslo, Norway. Manglerud was built in the 1960s as a suburb to Oslo, connected by the Oslo T-bane metro system.

== Sport ==
=== Ice hockey ===
The suburb is perhaps most known for its ice hockey team, Manglerud Star, which plays in the GET-ligaen, the highest level of Norwegian hockey. They are two times Norwegian champions, in 1977 and in 1978.

== Notable people ==
- Paul Waaktaar-Savoy, member of the Norwegian band a-ha
- Magne Furuholmen, member of the Norwegian band a-ha
- Marius Müller, musician
