= Bjølsen =

Neighborhood in Oslo, Norway

Coordinates: 59°56′18″N 10°45′30″E

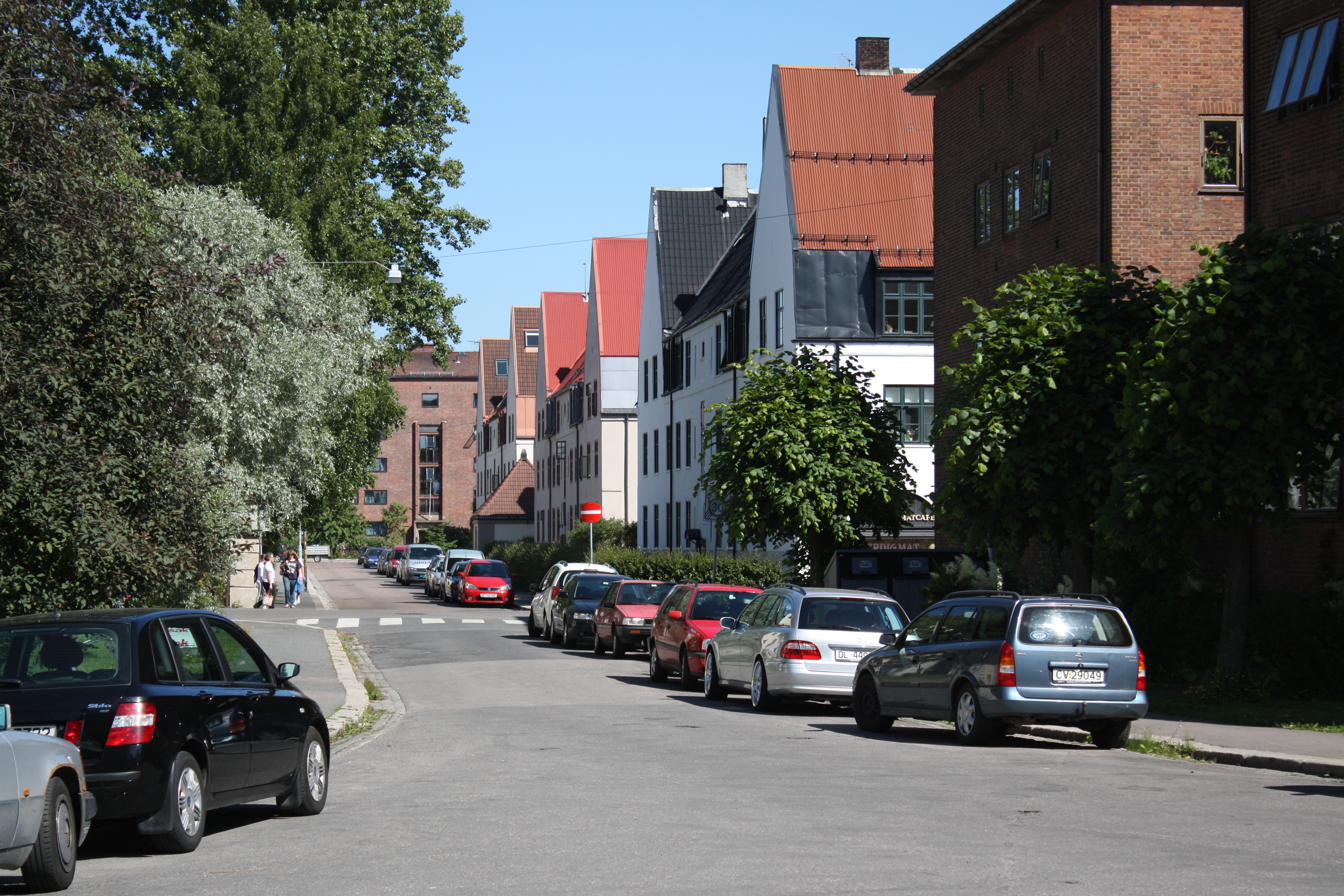
Bjølsen

Bjølsen is a neighbourhood in the Sagene borough in central-northern Oslo, Norway. Originally a farm in the former Aker municipality, it was incorporated into Christiania (now Oslo) in 1878.

It has been sawmill and mill operation as far back as the 17th century. Later came the textile industry to Bjølsen, and also a granite quarry.

After most of Bjølsen was incorporated in Christiania (Oslo) in 1878 and much of the farm land was purchased by the municipality it became regulated park, Bjølsen park, which is still a green lung in the area. It adjoins a colonial garden where the children's television series Portveien 2 was recorded.

== Notable sites ==
- Aker River: Oslo's green lung. The river historically has given power to numerous industry companies in Oslo
- Bjølsen park: 34 acre park that is known for a beautiful linden tree-lined street which runs north–south along the park's highest point
- Margarinfabrikken (Margarine Factory): Historic margarine factory that was in operation until 1929; now Norway's largest kindergarten.
- Bjølsenveggen (Bjølsen wall): 50+ meter street mural completed in 2020
- Bjølsenhallen (Bjølsen hall): sports and business center that includes large indoor sports hall, pharmacy and a large grocery store. The sports hall consists of a handball court with grandstand, a floorball court and a number of smaller halls. Hall was a historic site to a sabotage act by Max Manus and others during World War II.
- Oslo skatepark: Norway's largest and only sports center built exclusively for skateboarders

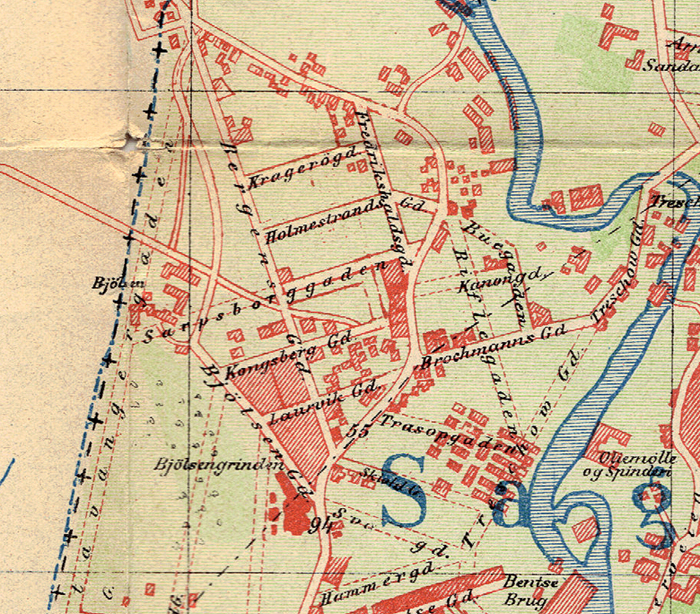
Bjølsen map 1900
