= Ulsrud =

Neighbourhood in Oslo, Norway

Coordinates: 59°53′27″N 10°50′55″E

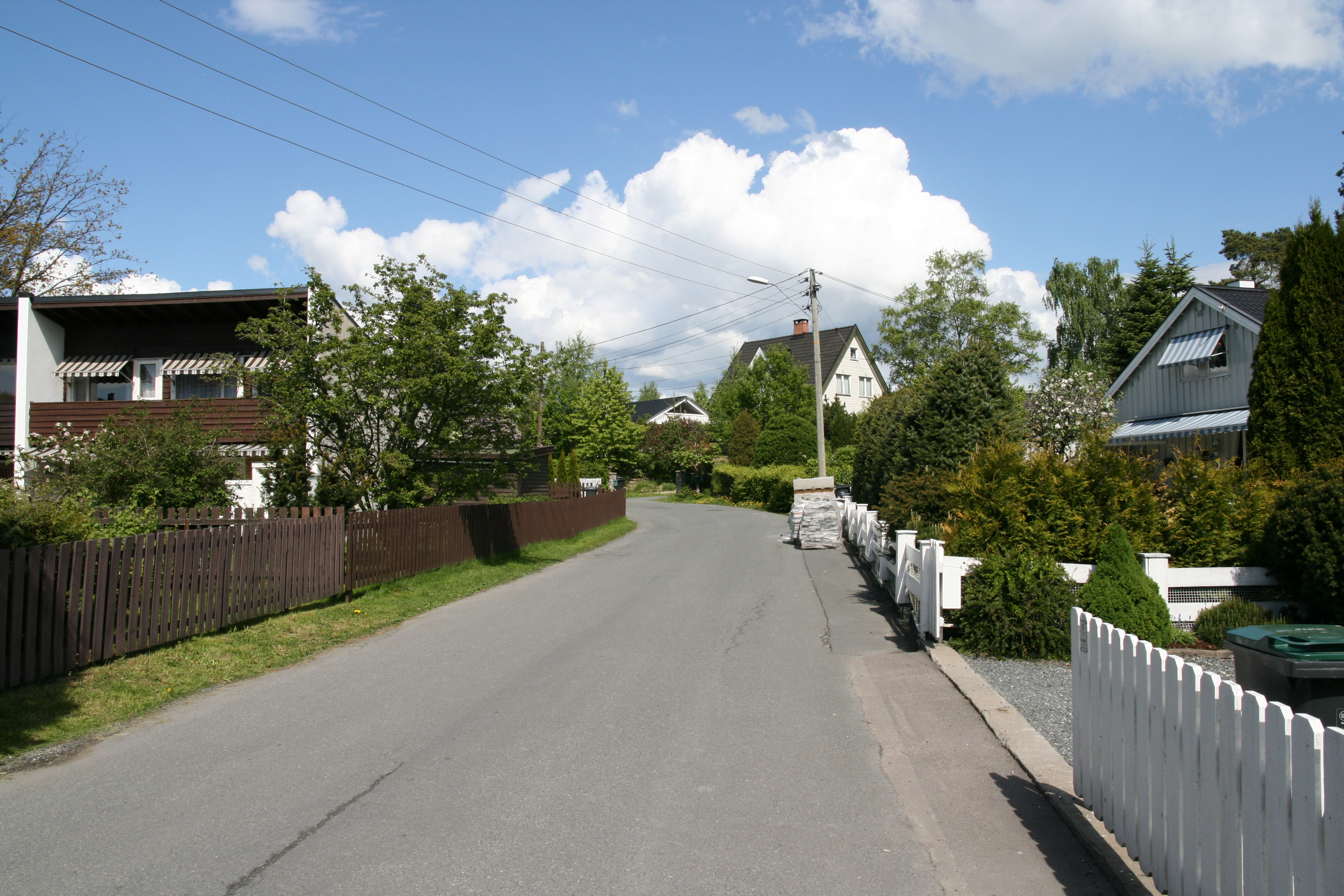
From Østbyfaret, Ulsrud.

Ulsrud is a neighbourhood in Oslo, Norway. Previously an ancient farm, and located between the lakes Østensjøvannet and Ulsrudvannet.

The area is served by the Ulsrud station of the Østensjø Line on the Oslo Metro.
