= Bogerud =

Neighborhood in Oslo, Norway

Coordinates: 59°52′32″N 10°50′30″E

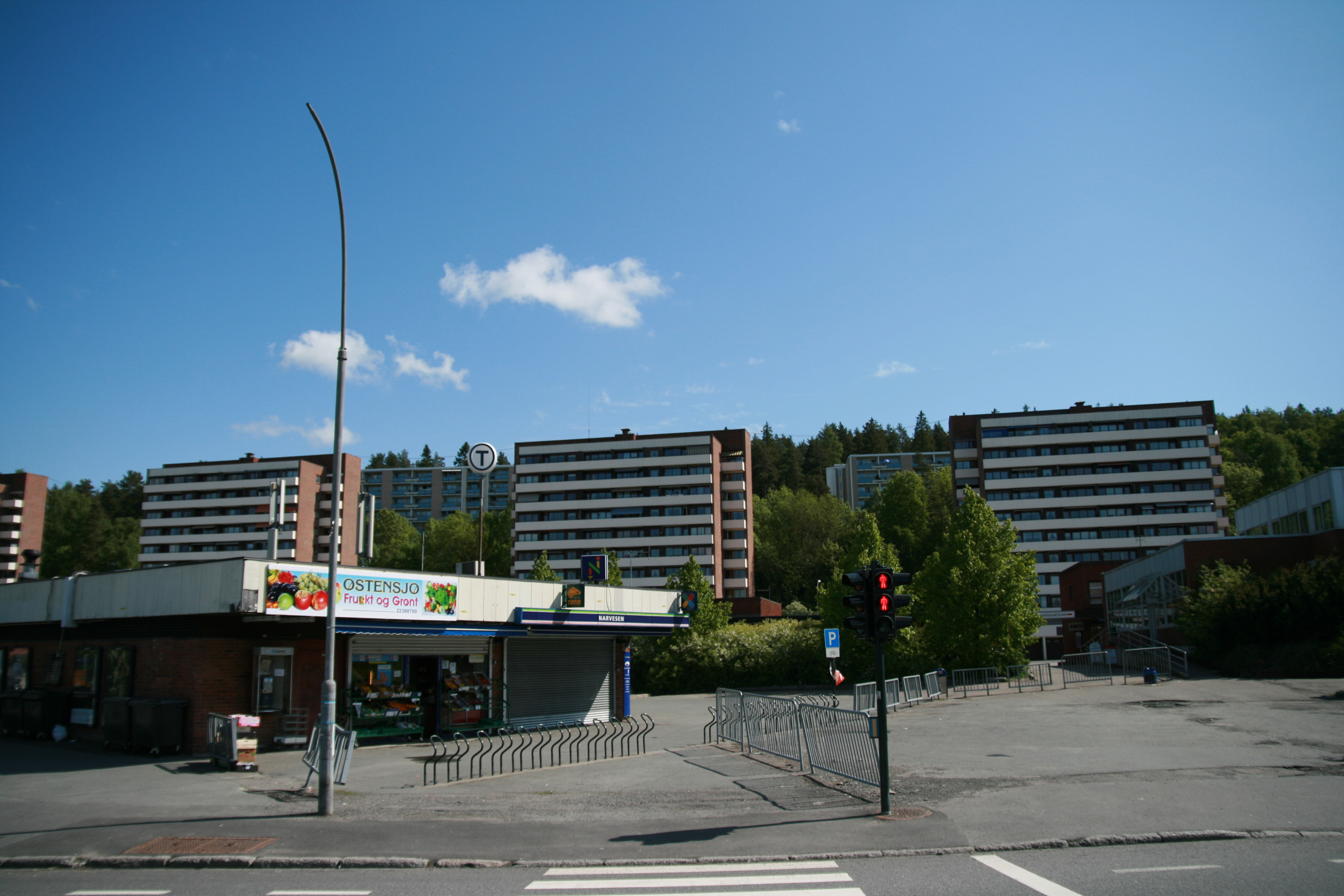
Bogerud.

Bogerud is a neighbourhood in Oslo, Norway. It is located southeast of the lake Østensjøvannet. The area belonging to the ancient Bogerud farm was developed from the early 1960s.

Bogerud is served by the Bogerud station of the Østensjø Line on the Oslo Metro.
