= Ellingsrud =

- Neighbourhood
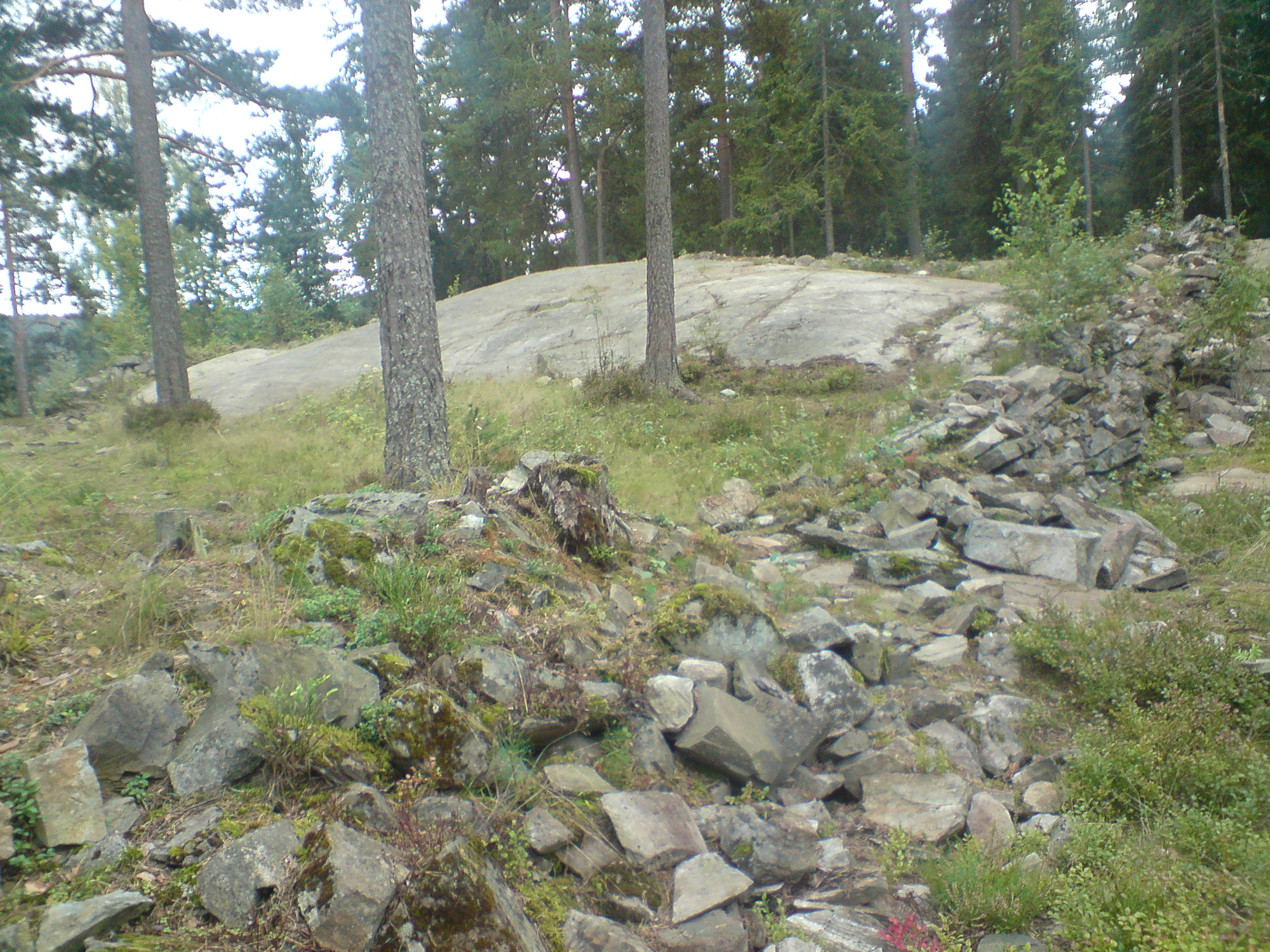
- In the forest by Ellingsrud
- Nickname: E-rud
- Interactive map of Ellingsrud
- Coordinates: 59°55′52″N 10°55′15″E
- Country: Norway
- County: Oslo
- District: Groruddalen
- Municipality: Oslo
- Borough: Alna
- Time zone: UTC+1 (CET)
  - Summer (DST): UTC+2 (CEST)
- Postal codes: 1061–1064

Ellingsrud is a neighbourhood in the borough of Alna in the north-east part of Oslo, Norway. Ellingsrud consists of Ellingsrudåsen, Bakås, Fjeldstad, Karihaugen, Munkebekken, and the small area of Kaiekroken, located in the far east close to Furuset and Lindeberg. The population is approx. 7,000 people. Ellingsrud is located north of the recreational forest Østmarka. Most of Ellingsrud was built in the 1970s, and has two primary schools (Bakås and Ellingsrudåsen), and one lower secondary school (Ellingsrud). Ellingsrud church was opened in June 1981. Ellingsrud IL is a local sports club. The neighborhood is served by the Ellingsrudåsen Station of the Oslo T-bane, that opened 8 November 1981.
