= Teisen =

Neighborhood in Oslo, Norway

Coordinates: 59°54′55.16″N 10°49′3.85″E

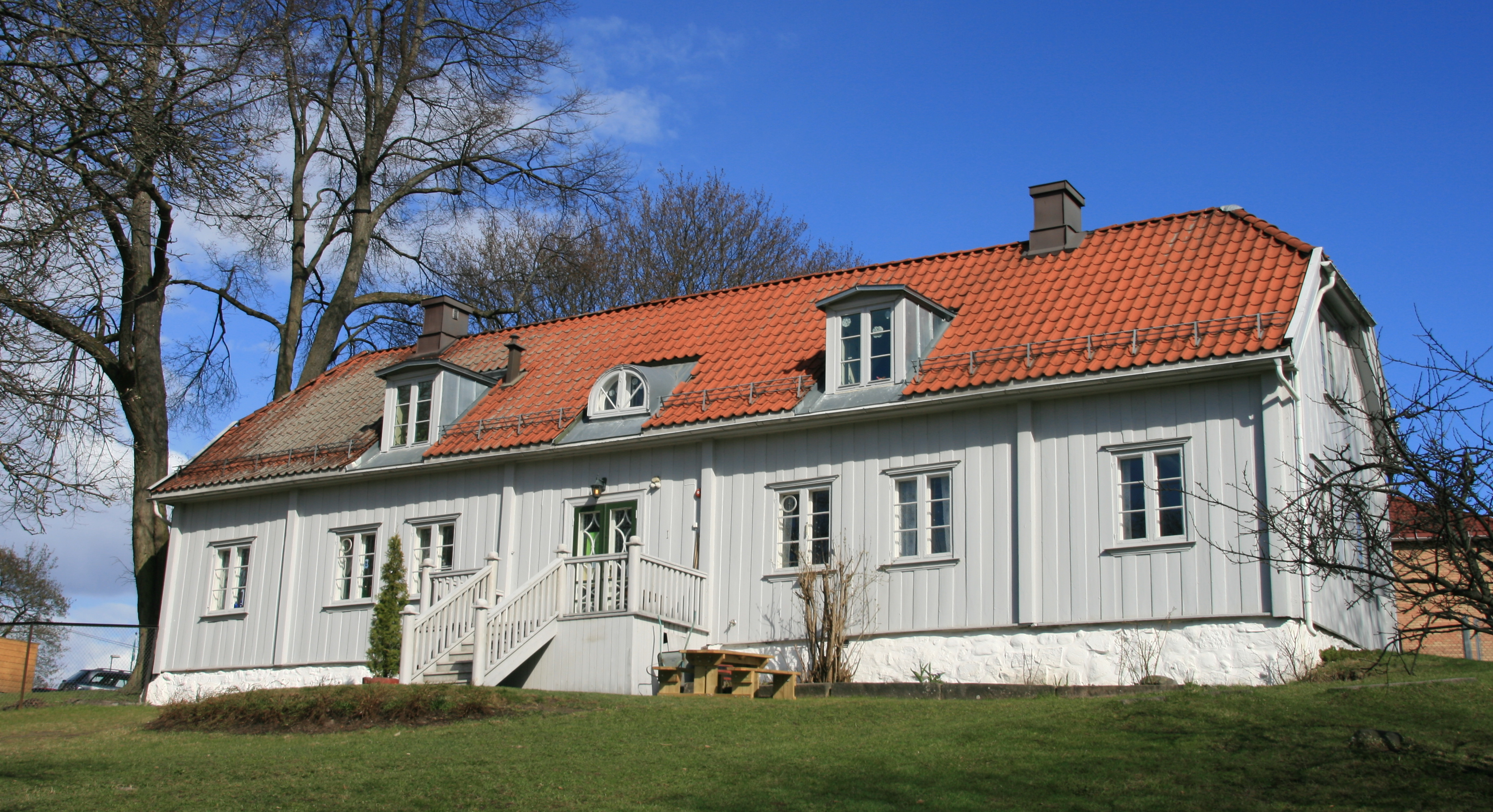
Teisen farm in 2010.

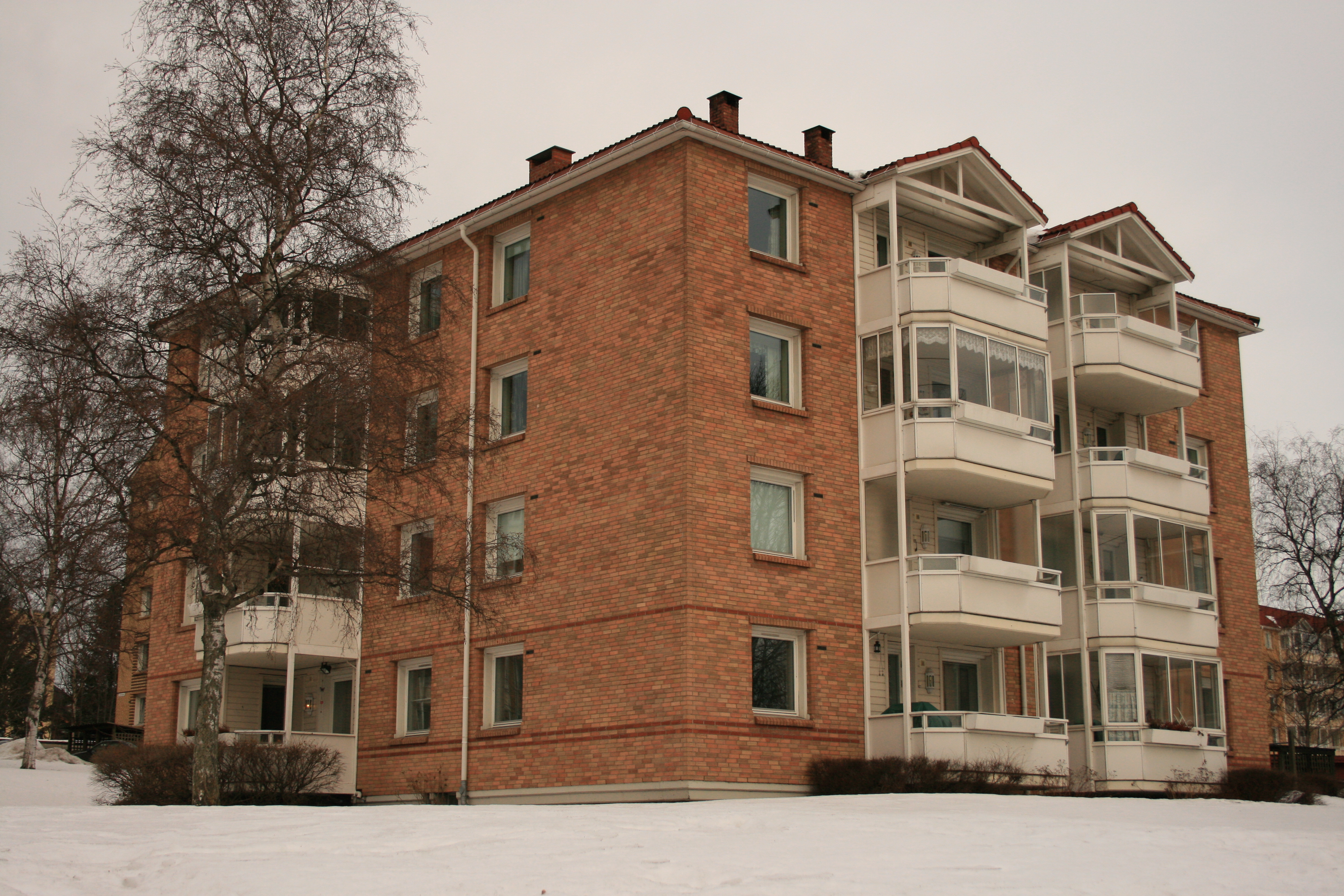
Residential building in Teisen, 2010.

Teisen is a neighborhood in the borough of Alna in Oslo, Norway.

It was a residential area in the 19th century, but from the 1950s it was built up with apartment blocks.
