= Minna Wetlesen =

Norwegian educator

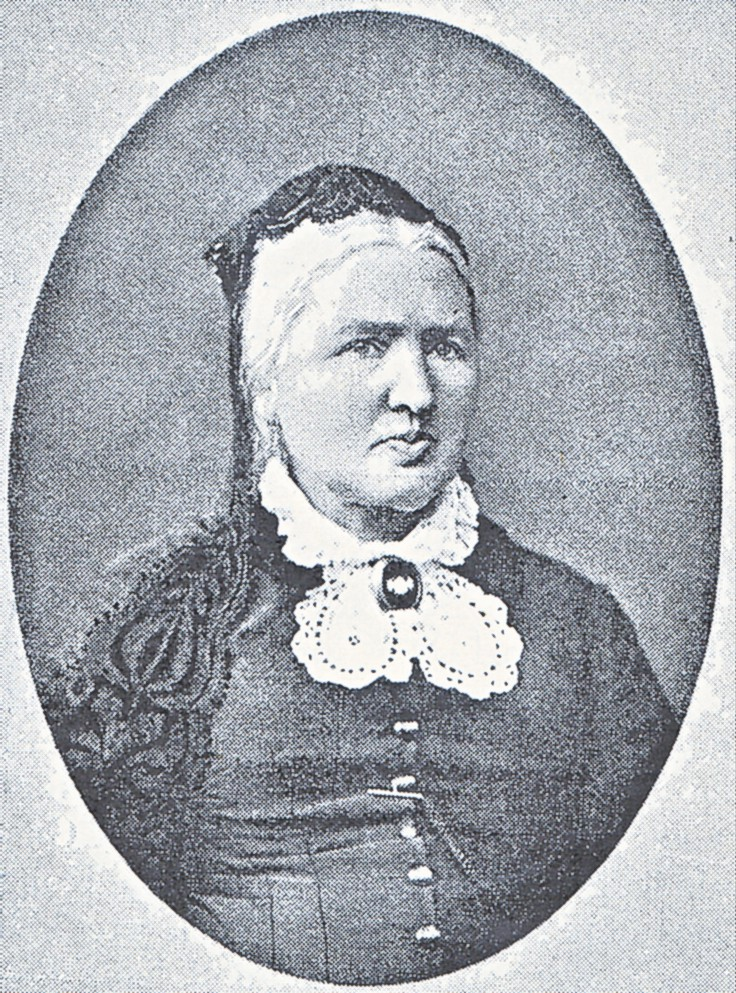
- Born: Annette Wilhelmine Bülow; 18 January 1821; Drammen, Norway
- Died: 14 March 1891 (aged 70)
- Occupations: Educator, teacher writer

Minna Wetlesen (née Annette Wilhelmine Bülow; 18 January 1821 – 14 March 1891) was a pioneer Norwegian educator, teacher and author.

== Biography ==
Annette Wilhelmine Bülow was born at Drammen in Buskerud, Norway. She was the daughter of Danish-born naval officer Ludwig Wilhelm von Bülow (1790-1834). and Anette Sophie Edel von Bülow (1789-1872). Her parents were members of the Danish noble Bülow family. After the death of her father, she and her mother moved to Copenhagen. In 1845, she married Frederik Wetlesen (1815-1890) who taught at the agricultural school founded by his father, Michael von Zenthe Wetlesen.

In 1865, she and her husband started Minna og Frederik Husgjerningsskole, a school for young farm girls situated at the historic farm Abildsø (Abildsø gård) in Aker, east of Christiania (now Oslo). This was the first such school in Norway. The school offered classes in mathematics and the Norwegian language as well as home economics, cooking, care of livestock and processing of farm products. In 1890, she published her popular cookbook for young housewives, Husholdningsbog for unge Husmødre i By og Bygd (Kristiania. 1890).

== Related reading ==
- Husgjerningsskolen på Abildsø - Europas første husmorskole (Erik Henning Edvardsen)
