= Østensjøvannet =

Lake in Oslo, Norway

Østensjøvannet Nature Reserve
- IUCN category Ia (strict nature reserve)
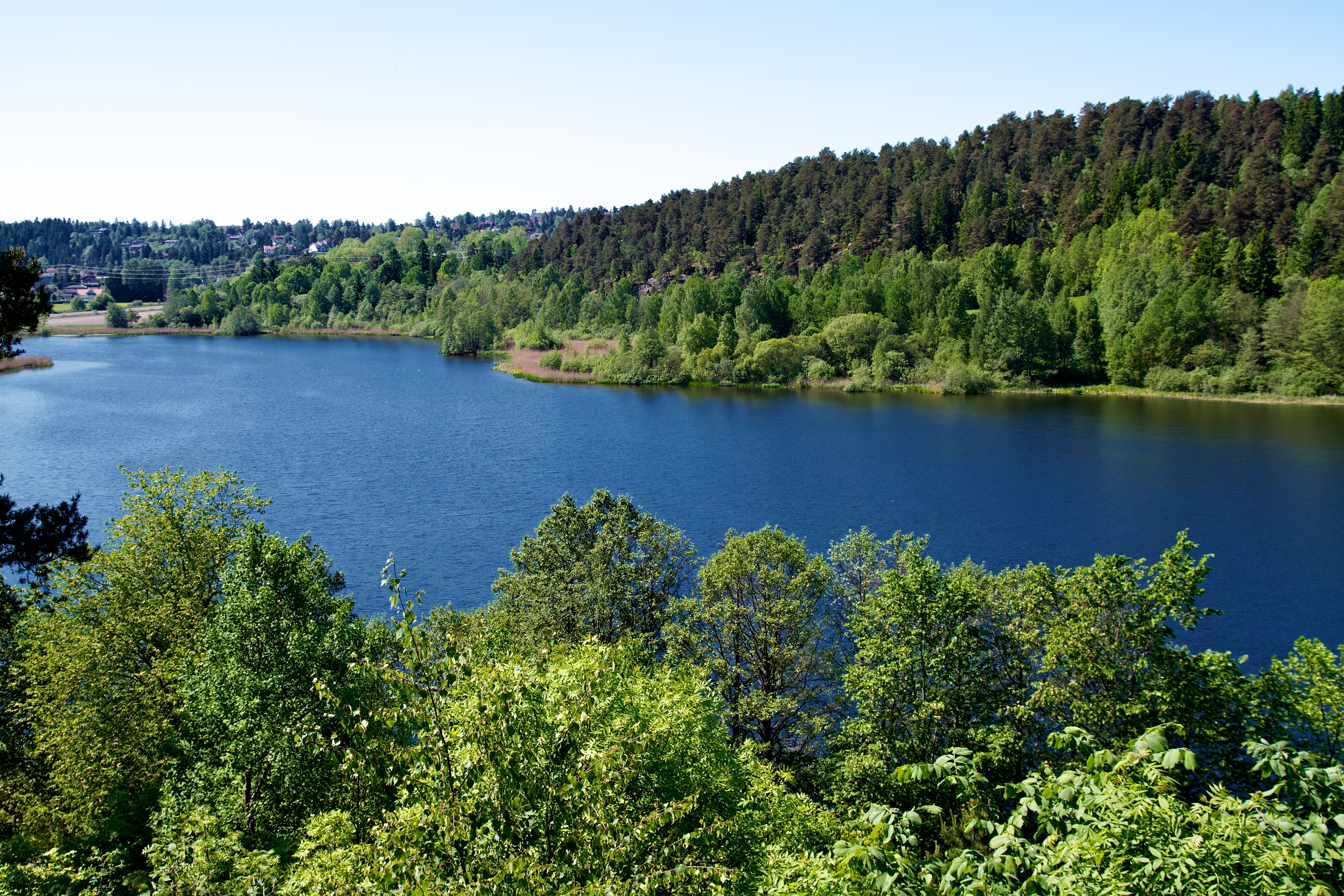
- Østensjøvannet lake
- Interactive map of Østensjøvannet Nature Reserve
- Location: Oslo
- Coordinates: 59°53′18″N 10°49′37″E

Østensjøvannet is a lake located in the Østensjø borough in Oslo, Norway. It is well known for the wide variety of birds and other wildlife that can be found there. It is currently a wildlife preserve, though urban development posed a serious threat to the lake and its environs during the 1980s and early 1990s.

== Etymology ==
Østensjøvannet ("Østensjø lake") is named after the Østensjø farm (old Norse Austansjór). The first element is austan 'east of', and the last element is sjór 'sea, lake'. The farm was situated on the lake's east side. The last element is the finite form of vann 'water; lake'. The meaning of the name is then 'the lake belonging to Østensjø'.

== Wildlife ==
Østensjøvannet is well known for its birdlife, and over 200 different species of birds have been sighted at or near the lake, quite a significant number by Norwegian standards. Other wildlife is regularly sighted at the lake, but the variety of species is not much different from surrounding places, such as Østmarka. Fishing during the summer is forbidden, while ice-fishing is allowed.

== Cultural history ==
Finds in the area suggest that people may have been living in the area as far back as the stone age. Farming in the area started around 500 AD. At various locations surrounding the lake, there are burial mounds from the Viking Age.

Abildsø gård, located on the lake's west side, was Norway's second farm school. It was where Minna Wetlesen started Europe's, and possibly the world's first "household" - school where girls and young women could learn about running a household and performing the various tasks related to it.

== Environmental issues ==
The lake itself has been a wildlife preserve since 1992, while Abildsø gård was preserved by the Norwegian Directorate for Cultural Heritage (Riksantikvar) in 1997. In 2002, the Oslo city council passed plans for the "Østensjøvannet Environmental Park", which in effect preserves the various habitats and "green areas" surrounding the lake.

Situated inside the Oslo city limits, surrounded on all sides by built-up areas, has put a considerable strain on the lake, both in terms of pollution (especially caused by leaks from less-than-perfectly maintained sewage systems) and plans for using the fields and forested areas surrounding the lake for various purposes, including housing, a cemetery and even a small golf course. The sewage systems affecting the lake have been better maintained in recent years, and the environmental state of the lake is currently much better than it was a decade or two ago.
