= Skullerud =

Skullerud is a Norwegian last name. Notable people with the name include:

- Fritz Skullerud (1885–1969), Norwegian runner and station master
- Tor Ole Skullerud (born 1970), Norwegian football player and manager

== See also ==
- Skullerud (station), a train station in Oslo, Norway
