= Tveita =

Neighbourhood in Oslo, Norway

Coordinates: 59°23′N 5°59′E

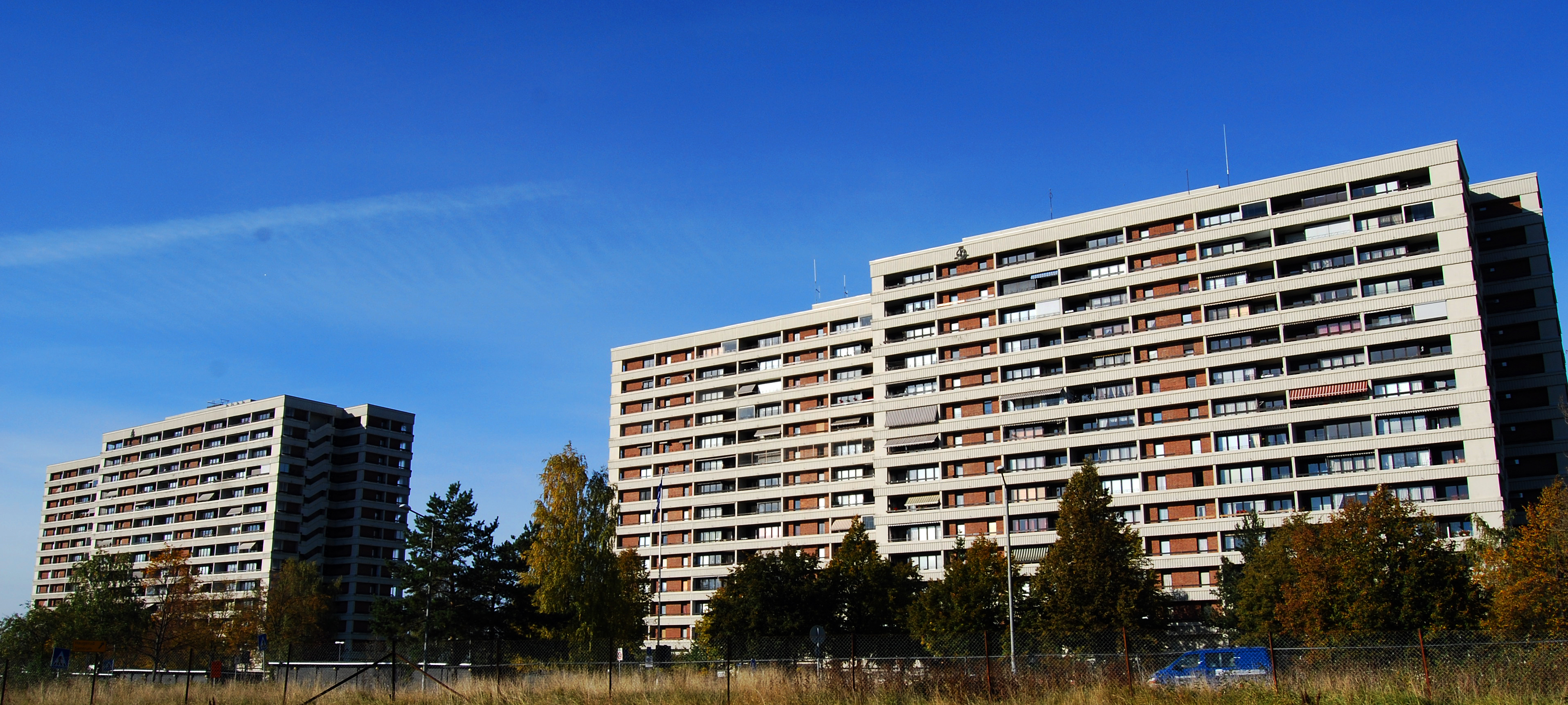
Buildings at Tveita.

Tveita is a neighborhood in the borough of Alna in Oslo, Norway.

The area was built up between 1963 and 1967. It is served by the station Tveita on the Oslo Metro, and among the facilities is a shopping mall.

== Tveita-gjengen ==
Tveita is perhaps best known as the place of origin for Tveita-gjengen, which was an infamous criminal gang who dominated the crime scene in the Oslo area during the 1980s and 1990s.
