= Furuset =

Suburban area of Oslo, Norway

Coordinates: 59°56′4″N 10°53′4″E

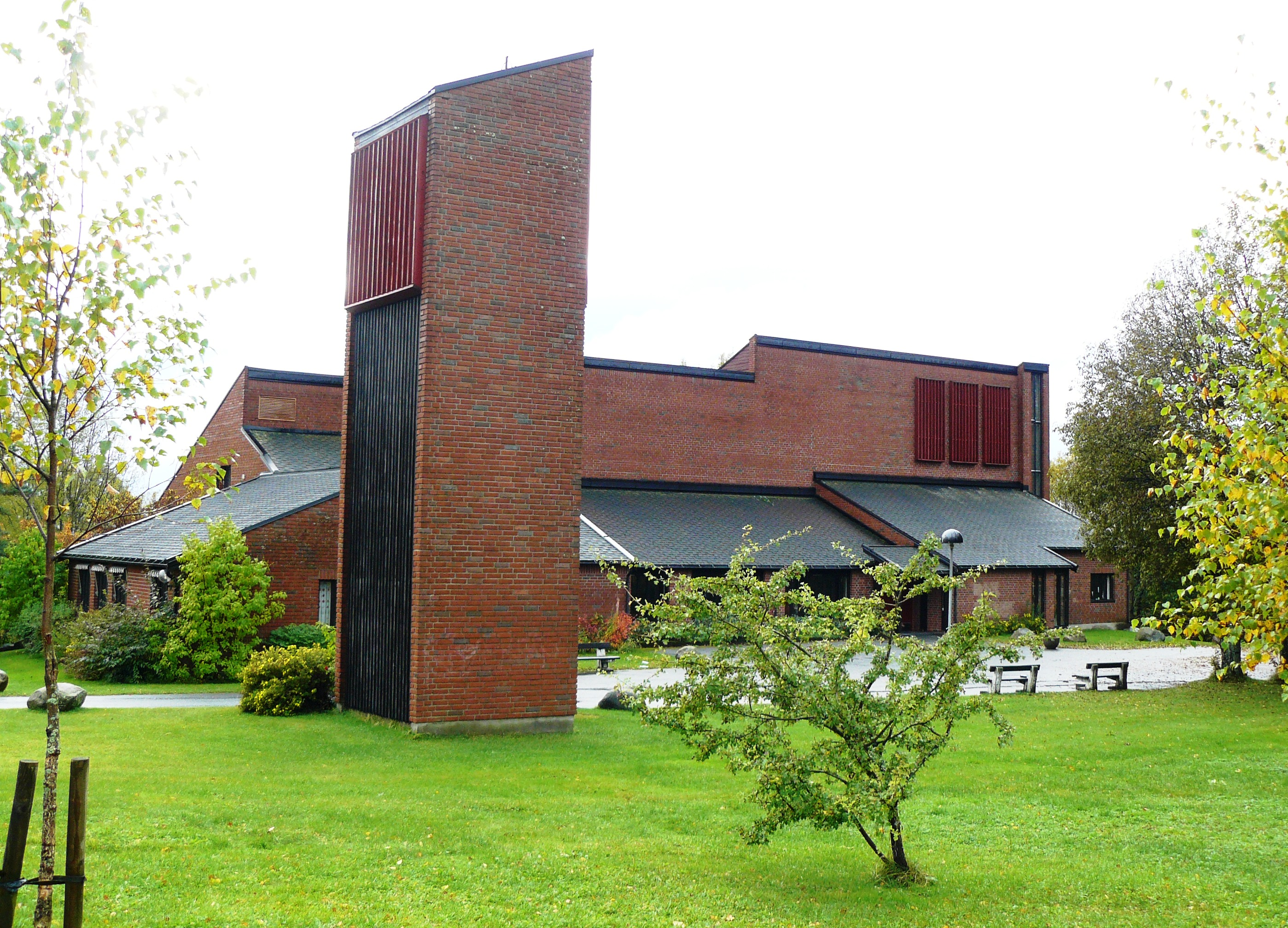
Furuset Church

Furuset is residential and suburban area, situated in the northeast of Oslo, Norway. It was a separate borough of Oslo up to January 1, 2004, when it became part of the new borough of Alna. Furuset is a suburb in eastern Groruddalen, consisting of both residential blocks and houses.

Furuset Church (Furuset Kirke) was built during 1980. The church belongs to Ellingsrud Furuset parish and Østre Aker deanery. The church is located at Ulsholtveien 37, just south of Furuset Cultural Park (Furuset kulturpark).

Furuset Aktivitetspark opened in the neighborhood in 2008.
