= Haugerud, Oslo =

Neighborhood in Oslo, Norway

Coordinates: 59.9206°N 10.8553°E

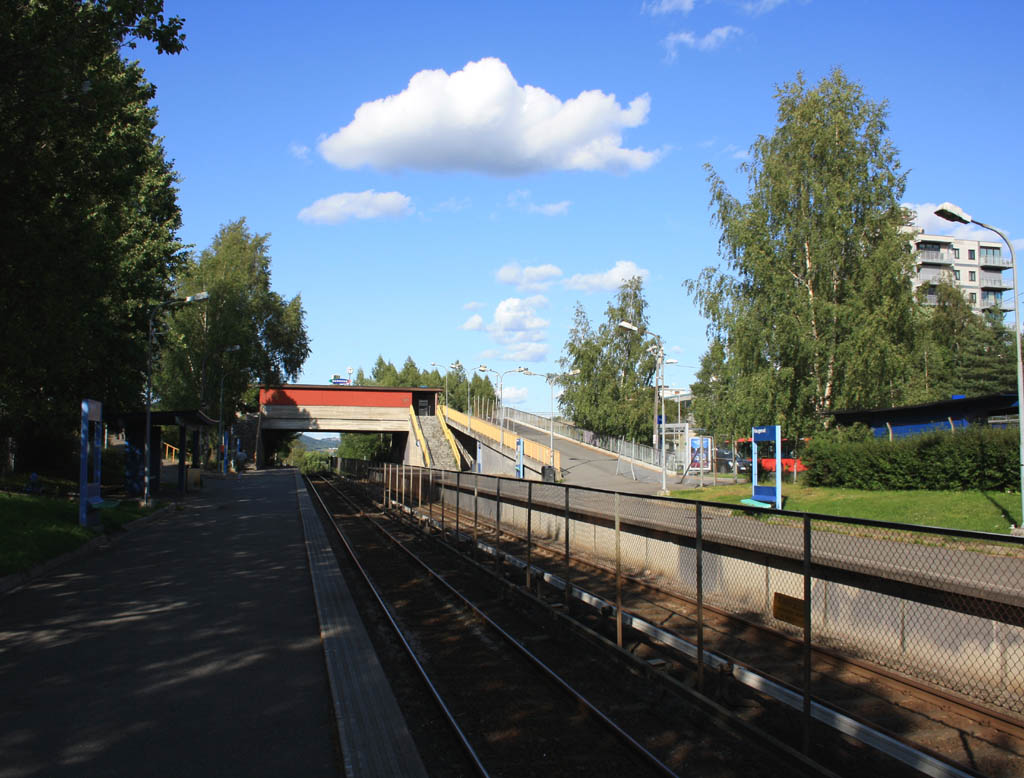
Haugerud Station

Haugerud is a neighborhood in the borough of Alna in Oslo, Norway.

Its origin was a farm of the same name. It first had a private owner in 1670. Some of the land was parceled out in the early 1900s, and the rest of the land was bought by the municipality in 1947, and built up with apartment blocks in the late 1960s. Since 1970 it's served by the station Haugerud on the Oslo Metro. The local church opened in 1975, and the neighborhood also has a shopping mall.

== Haugerud Church ==
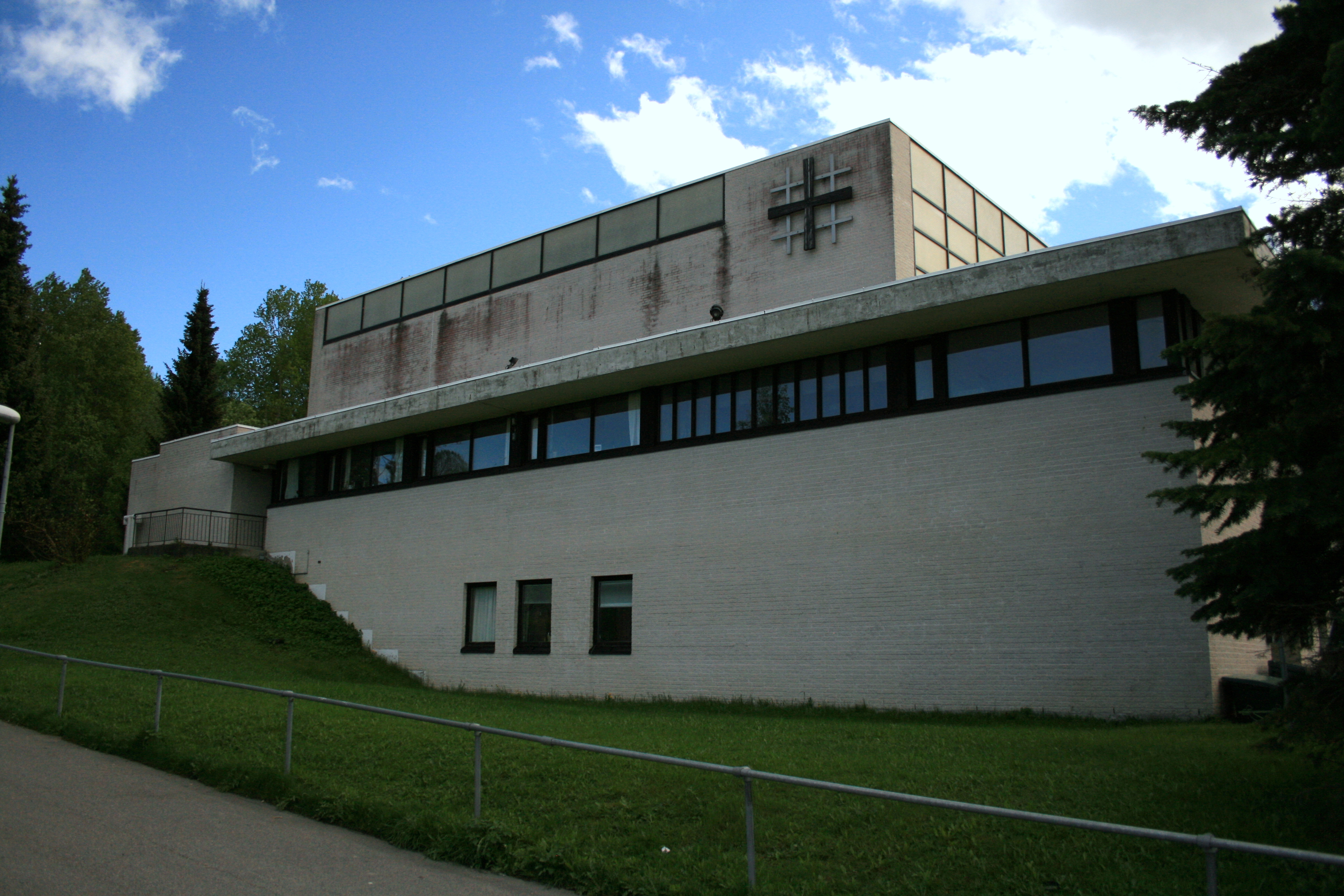
Haugerud Church

Haugerud Church is a church center, consecrated in 1966. The church belongs to the Church of Norway. The altarpiece is a tapestry by Else Marie Jakobsen. The church bells are placed on the roof. The church has 600 seats in total.
