= Oppsal =

Suburb in the borough of Østensjø in Oslo, Norway

Coordinates: 59°53′43″N 10°50′57″E

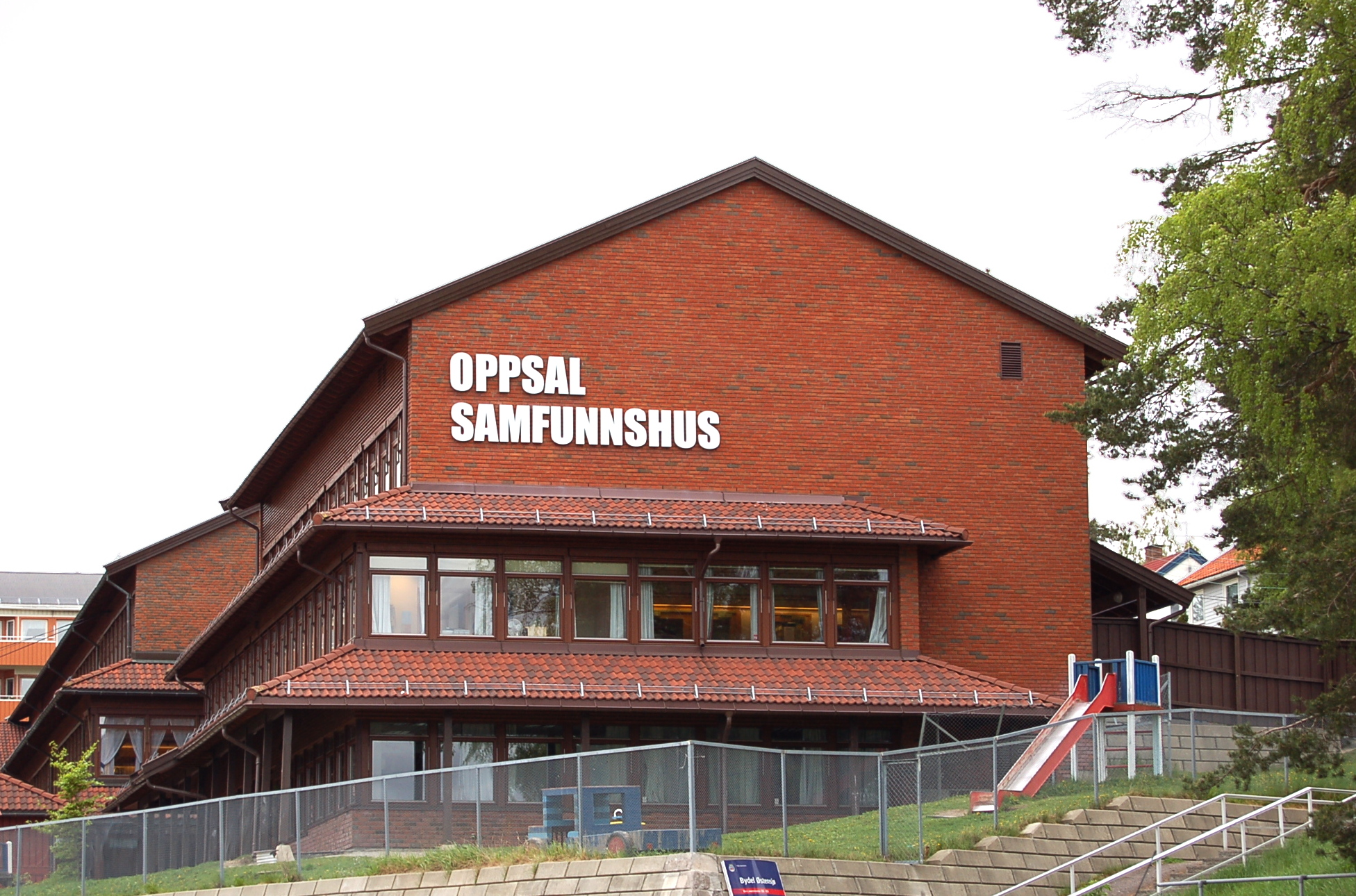
Oppsal community center, inaugurated 1979

Oppsal is a suburb in the borough of Østensjø in Oslo, Norway.

The modern history of Oppsal starts with villas and summer homes built during the Interwar period. The Oslo Tramway was extended to Oppsal in 1926.

Oppsal was developed as a planned suburb after World War II, and the first apartment block was built in 1954. The suburb got its own church in 1961, and a shopping mall opened in 1964. Oppsal borders on the forested areas of Østmarka.

The tram was upgraded to a subway in 1967, and Oppsal is now served by Oppsal station on Østensjøbanen.

Oppsal is the hometown of the fictional detective Harry Hole, and is frequently mentioned in these thrillers. The worldwide popularity of the series has made Oppsal better known to non-Norwegians.
