= Grorud (disambiguation) =

Grorud is a borough of Oslo, Norway.

Grorud may also refer to:

== Norway ==
- Grorud (station), a rapid transit station on the Oslo Metro
- Grorud IL, a football club from Grorud
- Grorud Line, a line on the Oslo Metro
- Grorud Station, a railway station on the Trunk Line in Grorud
- Grorud Valley, a valley and urban area in Oslo
- Grorud Church, a historic church in Grorud

== People ==
- Lars Grorud (born 1983), Norwegian footballer
- Mats Grorud (born 1976), Norwegian film director
