= St. Mark's Church, Oslo =

Coordinates: 59°55′25.900″N 10°44′21.275″E

Saint Mark's Church
- Markus kirke
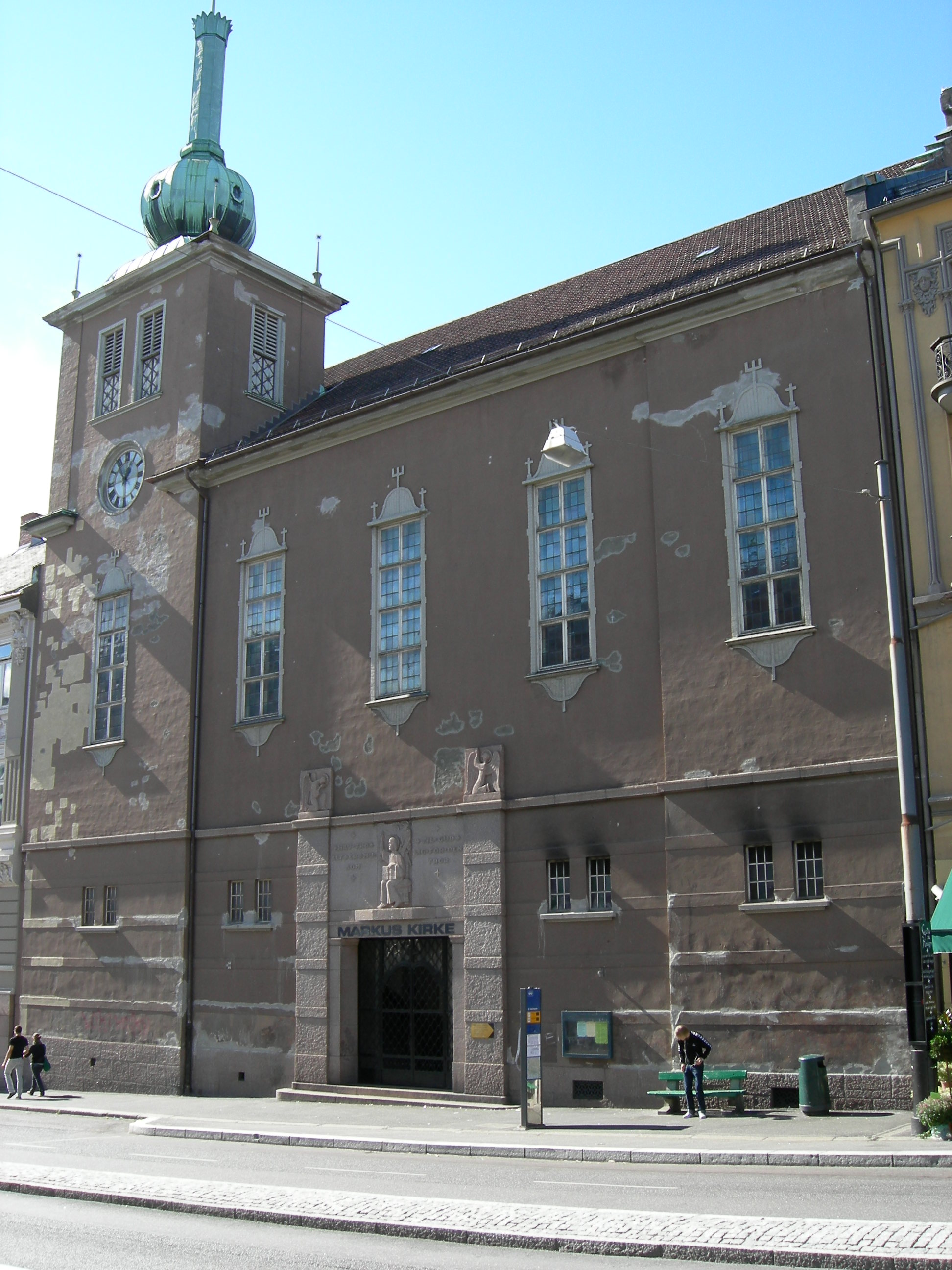

- Location in Oslo Saint Mark's Church (Norway)
- Location: Oslo
- Country: Norway

Architecture
- Architect: Sverre Knudsen
- Completed: 1927

Specifications
- Capacity: 530

Saint Mark's Church (Norwegian: Markus kirke) is a church in the St. Hanshaugen district of Oslo, Norway, completed in 1927. The church has entrances from Schwensen Street (Norwegian: Schwensens gate) no. 15 and on Ullevål Street (Norwegian: Ullevålsveien) no. 41.

== Building ==
Saint Mark's Church is a triple-nave long church (Norwegian: langkirke) two stories high with facades made of suspended brick. The church is one of the few churches in Oslo built into a dense block of apartment buildings on both sides. The construction lot was a rock outcropping when the church was built, and therefore there is a staircase up from street level on Ullevål Street. The main entrance is from Schwensen Street.

The architect of the church was Sverre Knudsen, who had spent extensive time in Sweden and was involved with Swedish architecture, and the church is reminiscent of this. Its style is a blend of Norwegian Baroque Revival (the side facing Ullevål Street) and Neoclassicism. The belfry on Ullevål Street is flush against the structure and the tower spire is covered in copper plating. Facing Schwensen Street, the building has a low two-story octagonal belfry with a spire and a granite-framed entrance to the tower.

The decoration in the chancel and the altar table were created by Enevold Thømt. The 34-voice organ was built by Josef Hilmar Jørgensen in 1927 and restored in 1991. It is one of the few remaining full Romantic organs in Norway of this size. The Norwegian composer Per Steenberg served as organist at the church from 1927 to 1940. The church can seat 530 people. Next to the church is a large parish center with halls, offices, and apartments for priests.

== Parish ==
Saint Mark's Parish was separated from Old Aker Parish in 1917. The parish encompassed the Bislett neighborhood and parts of the St. Hanshaugen district. The parish included 7,048 people as of January 1, 2005, of whom about 5,100 were members of the Church of Norway.

Saint Mark's Parish belonged to the Oslo Cathedral deanery. In March 2012 it was proposed that it be closed and that the parish merge with the Old Aker Parish and Lovisenberg Parish, which together would form a new St. Hanshaugen Parish with Old Aker Church as the parish church. Saint Mark's Church would then stop being used as a regular parish church.

On February 25, 2013, it was decided by the Oslo diocesan council that Saint Mark's Church would be freed up for other purposes. The cathedral, Trininty, Saint Mark's, Old Aker, and Lovisenberg were merged into one parish called Center and St. Hanshaugen Parish. The new parish totals about 16,000 members. The cathedral, Trinity Church, Old Aker Church, and Lovisenberg Church are active churches in the new parish.

Saint Mark's Church was made available for rental in 2013. Both organizations and churches expressed interest in it. The church warden in Oslo received authorization from the Joint Council of Churches to choose the lessee. In November 2013, the Pentecostal Jesus Church was selected. The lease is valid for five-year terms and is set at 700,000 kroner per year. On March 4, 2013, the Jesus Church celebrated its first service in the church.
