= Rødtvet =

Area of Oslo, Norway

Coordinates: 59.9516°N 10.8567°E

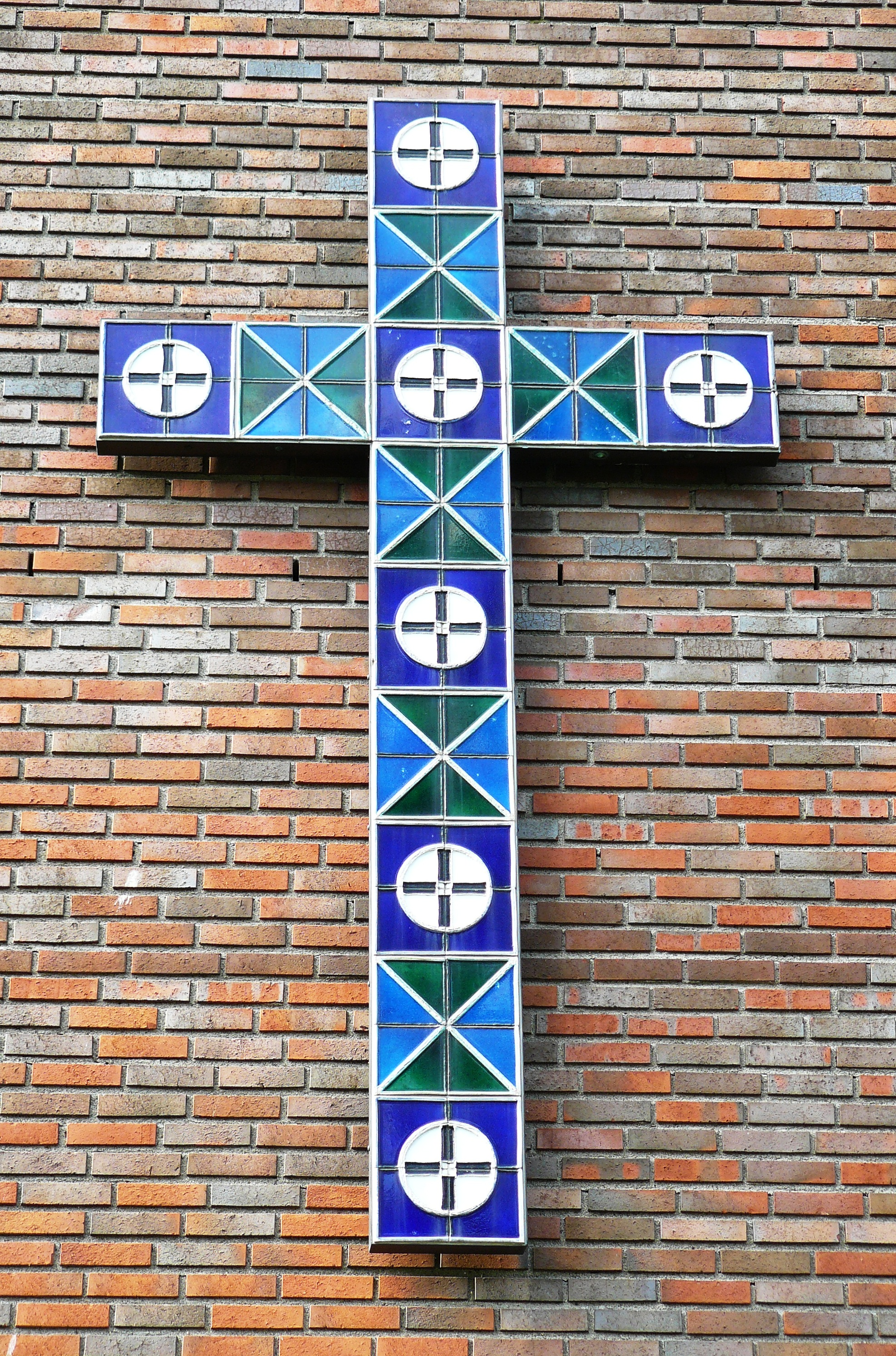
Cross at the church wall. Chell Hill, 2007

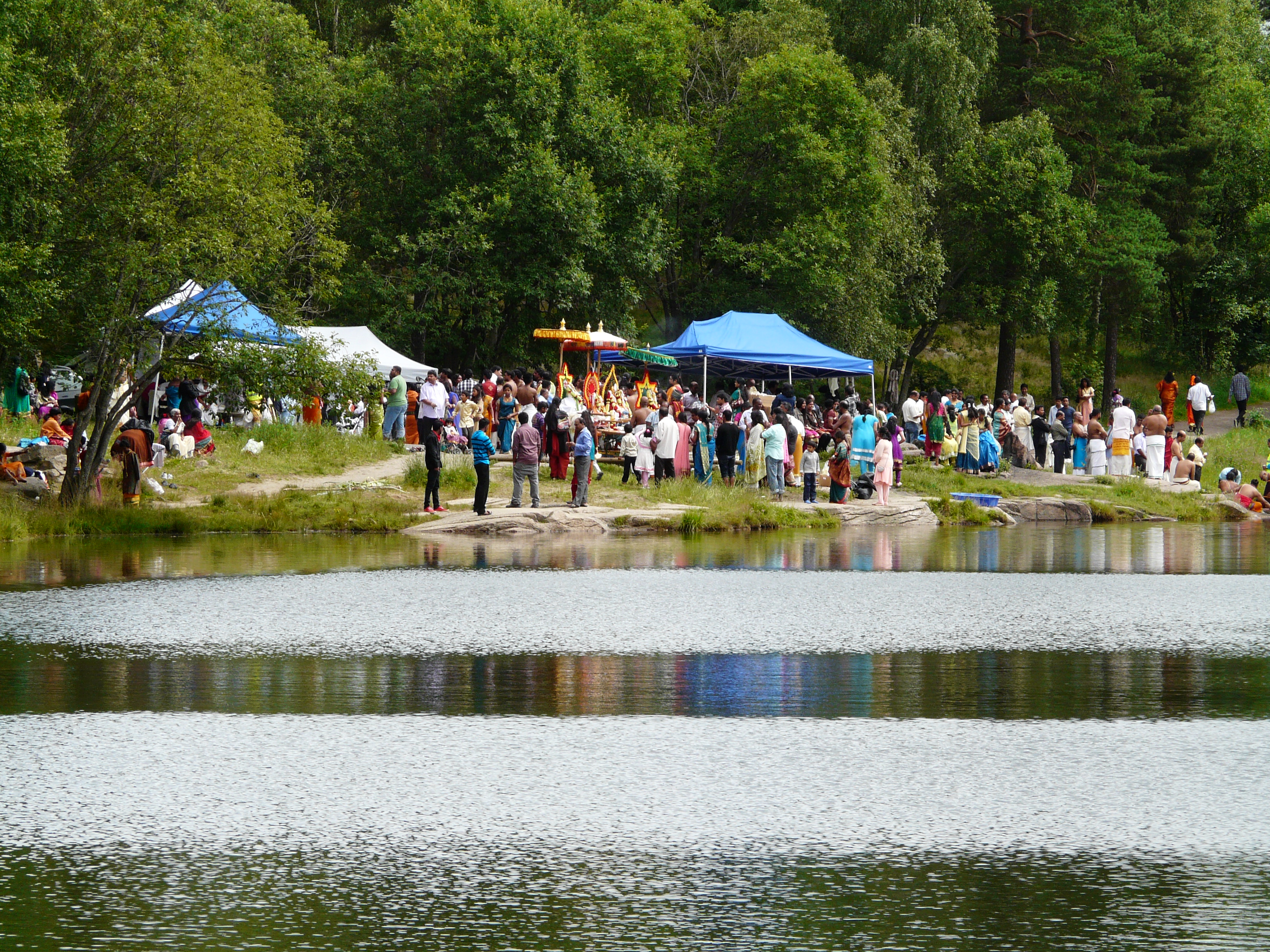
Hindu festival at the small lake Vesletjern, 2012. Photo by Ida Tolgensbakk.

Rødtvet is a residential area in the district of Grorud in Oslo, located just southwest of Grorud proper. The area was urbanized from the mid 1960s, and connected to the city centre with metro line 5 from 1966. Rødtvet has the forest Lillomarka as a neighbor to the north, and the residential areas Bredtvet, Kalbakken, Flaen and Nordtvet as its closest neighbors to the south.

The area is named after Rødtvet farm (Rødtvetveien 14), which in the Middle Ages belonged to the monastery at Hovedøya. The name itself has not been possible to fully interpret. "Tvet" comes from the Old Norse Þveit, which means "small piece of land", while "rød" stands uninterpreted.

The area was farmland until the 1800s, when a number of smaller industries appeared. Traces of mining, and of stone industries based on the local "Grorud granite" (mostly open pit mining), are still possible to observe in the Rødtvet terrain.

Rødtvet school was inaugurated in 1962, the nursing home in 1969. The church was consecrated in 1978. Situated in rented facilities behind the church is today the Norwegian Hindu Cultural Centre, which annually hosts a large-scale festival that attracts Hindus from all over Northern Europe.

== People from Rødtvedt ==
- Flamur Kastrati, Kosovar footballer

== Sources ==
- Oslo byleksikon 2000
- Rognstad, Kari 2001: «Gårdsliv på Rødtvet og Øvre Kalbakken», in: Årbok 2001, Groruddalen historielag
