= Willy B =

Willy B or Willie B may refer to:

- Willy Bakken, Norwegian musician and writer
- Willie B (producer), also known as The Ichiban Don
- Willie B, a western lowland gorilla
- Williamsburg Bridge, New York City, New York
- Williamsburg, Brooklyn, New York
- Williams–Brice Stadium, Columbia, South Carolina
