= Jesus Church =

Jesus Church may refer to:

- Jesus Church, Berlin-Kaulsdorf, a United church in Berlin, Germany
- Jesus Church, Cieszyn, a Lutheran church in Cieszyn, Poland
- Jesus Church, Copenhagen, a Church of Denmark church in Copenhagen, Denmark
- Jesus Church, Oslo, a Pentecostal church in Oslo, Norway
- Jesus Church, Troutbeck, an Anglican church in Troutbeck, England
- Church of Jesus, Riga, a Lutheran church in Riga, Latvia
- True Jesus Church, a non-denominational Christian church that originated in Beijing, China
