= Axel Ender =

Norwegian painter and sculptor

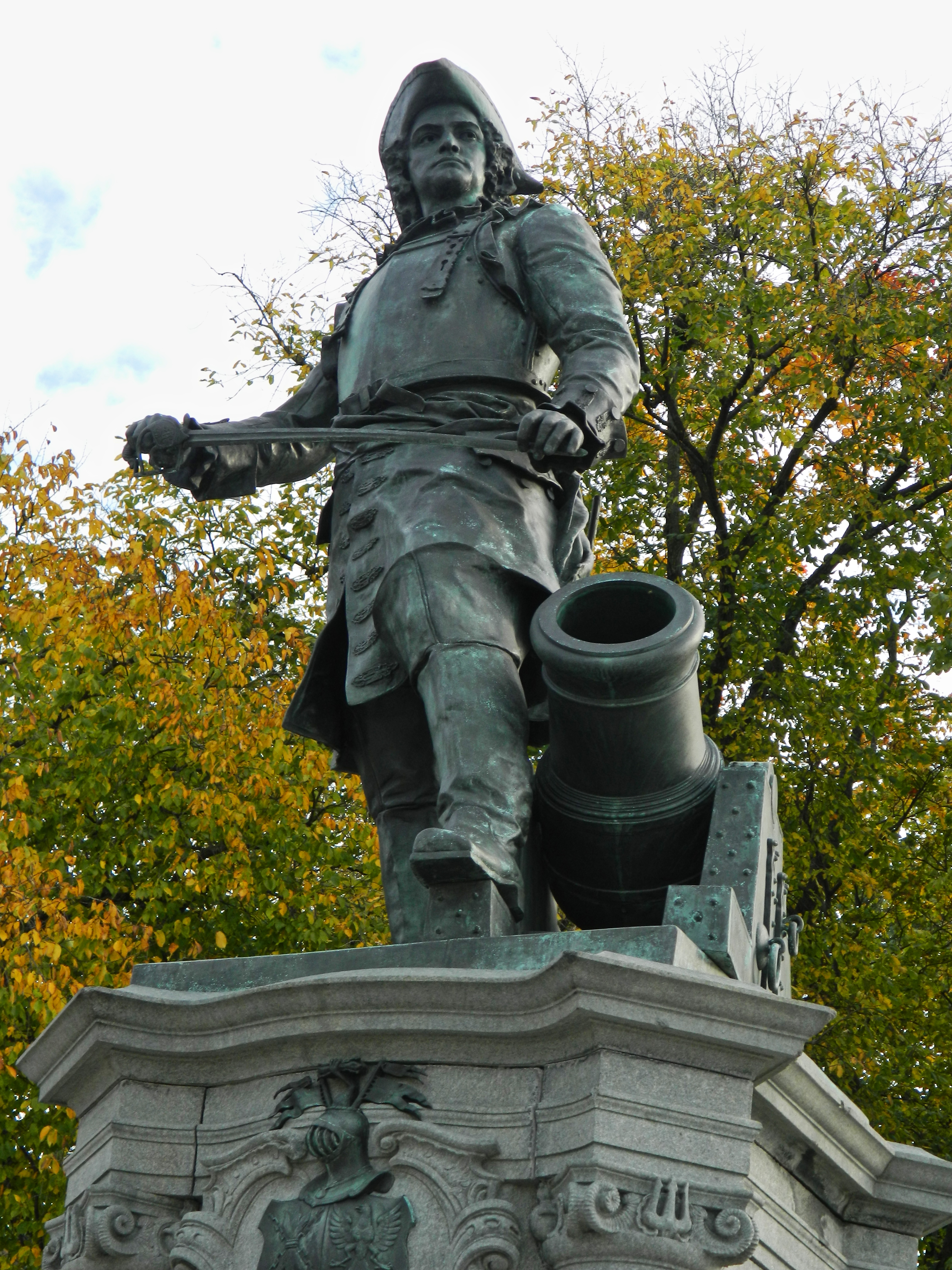
Peter Tordenskjold statue Rådhusplassen in Oslo

Axel Hjalmar Ender (14 September 1853 – 10 September 1920) was a Norwegian painter and sculptor, remembered primarily for his genre painting.

== Biography ==
Ender was born to a farming family at Asker in Akershus, Norway. He began his art studies from 1867 to 1871 with the sculptor, Julius Middelthun, at the Royal Drawing School. He later attended the Royal Swedish Academy of Arts (1872–74) and the Academy of Fine Arts, Munich (1875–80), with financial support from King Charles IV. He also conducted study trips to Munich (1875) and Paris (1878). From 1874 to 1875, he was a tutor for Erik Werenskiold, who was only two years his junior

His most notable project was the bronze sculpture of Peter Tordenskjold, Vice-Admiral in the Royal Danish-Norwegian Navy. His commission for the statue was the result of a major artistic competition. Ender worked for ten years (1891–1901) to complete his work which now stands at Rådhusplassen in Oslo. The competition for creating the statue was originally won by another sculptor, Anders Svor, but the actual work was assigned to Ender. Unveiled at Tordenskjolds plass in Pipervika on 17 May 1901, it was moved to its current location on Rådhusplassen in 1955. For his finished work, Ender was made a Knight in the Royal Norwegian Order of Saint Olav.

His paintings were frequently in the category of Romantic nationalism. Many of his early works were exhibited at the Christiania Kunstforening (now Oslo Kunstforening), a conservative art association run by non-artists. Altarpieces of his creation may be seen at Åsnes Church in Hedmark, Haug Church in Ringerike, Kampen Church in Oslo, Østre Porsgrunn Church in Telemark and Lunner Church in Oppland. The altarpiece which he designed for the former Molde Cathedral in Møre og Romsdal, was retained and stands today at the north wall of the new basilica which was constructed in 1957. He also designed Christmas cards, featuring winter activities.

== Gallery ==
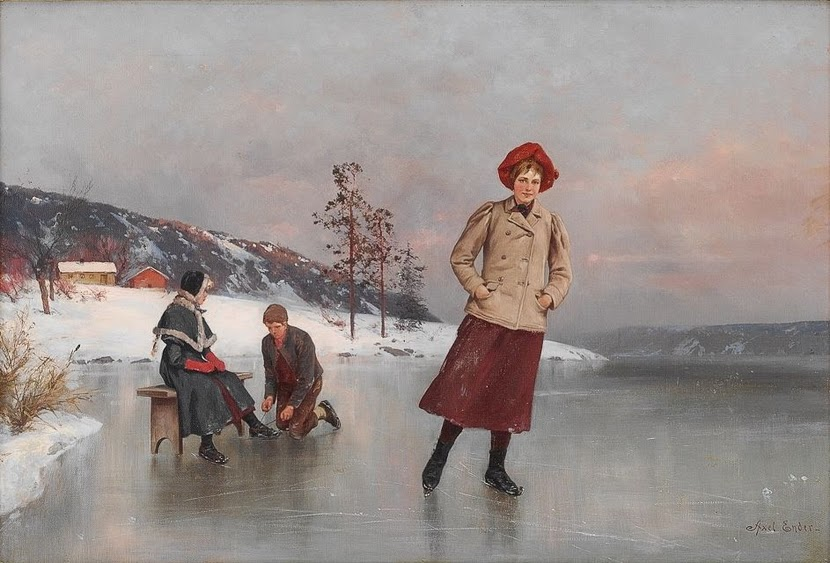
On the skating rink

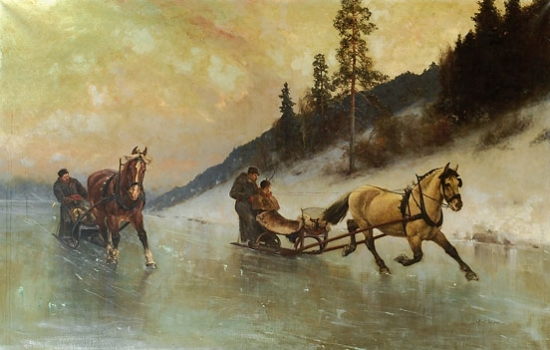
Sledding on the ice

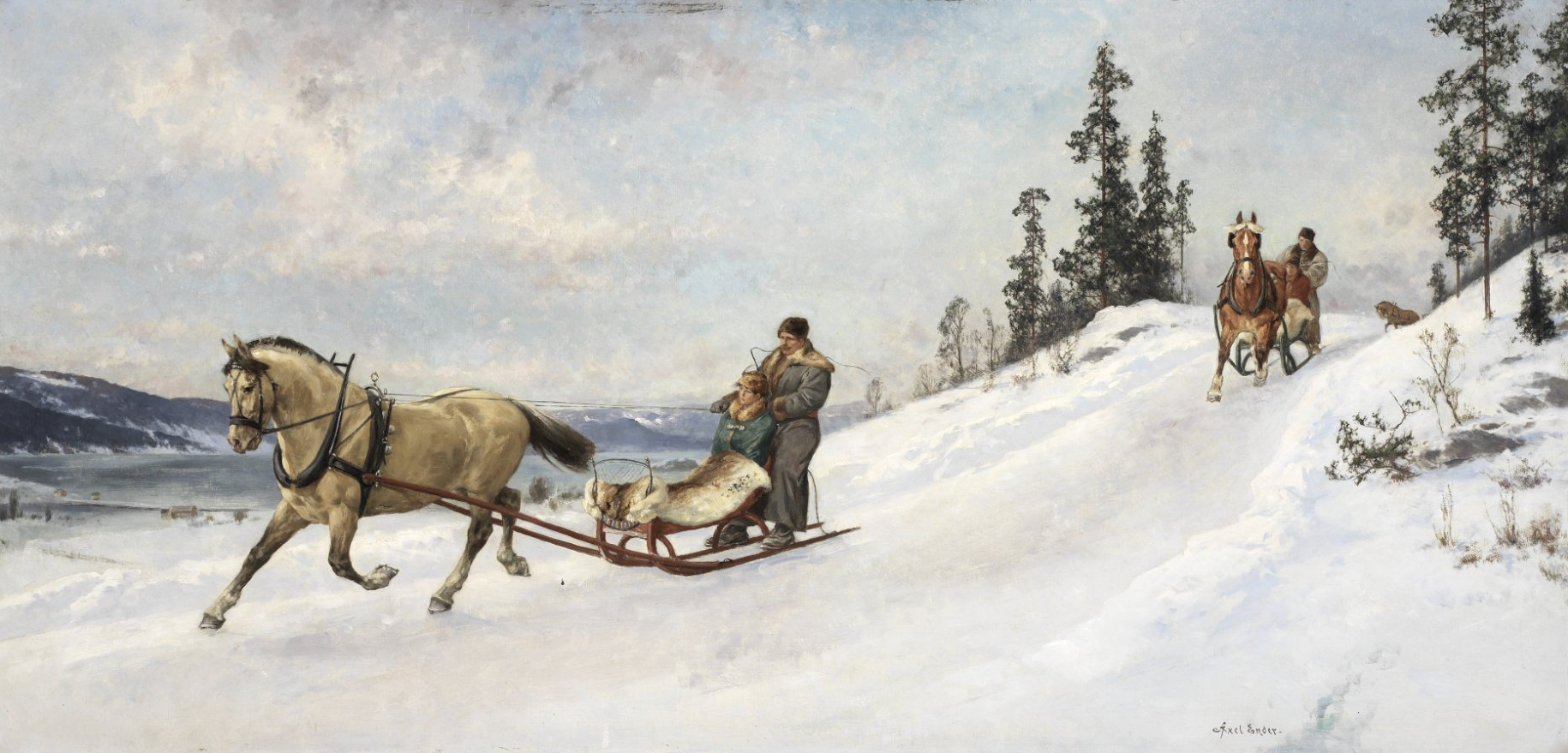
Winter getaway

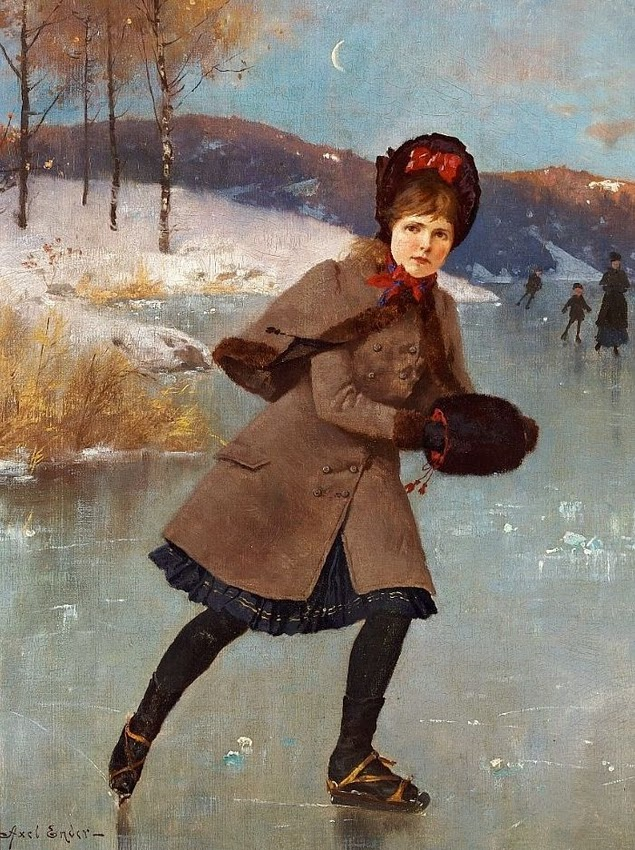
Young girl on a frozen lake

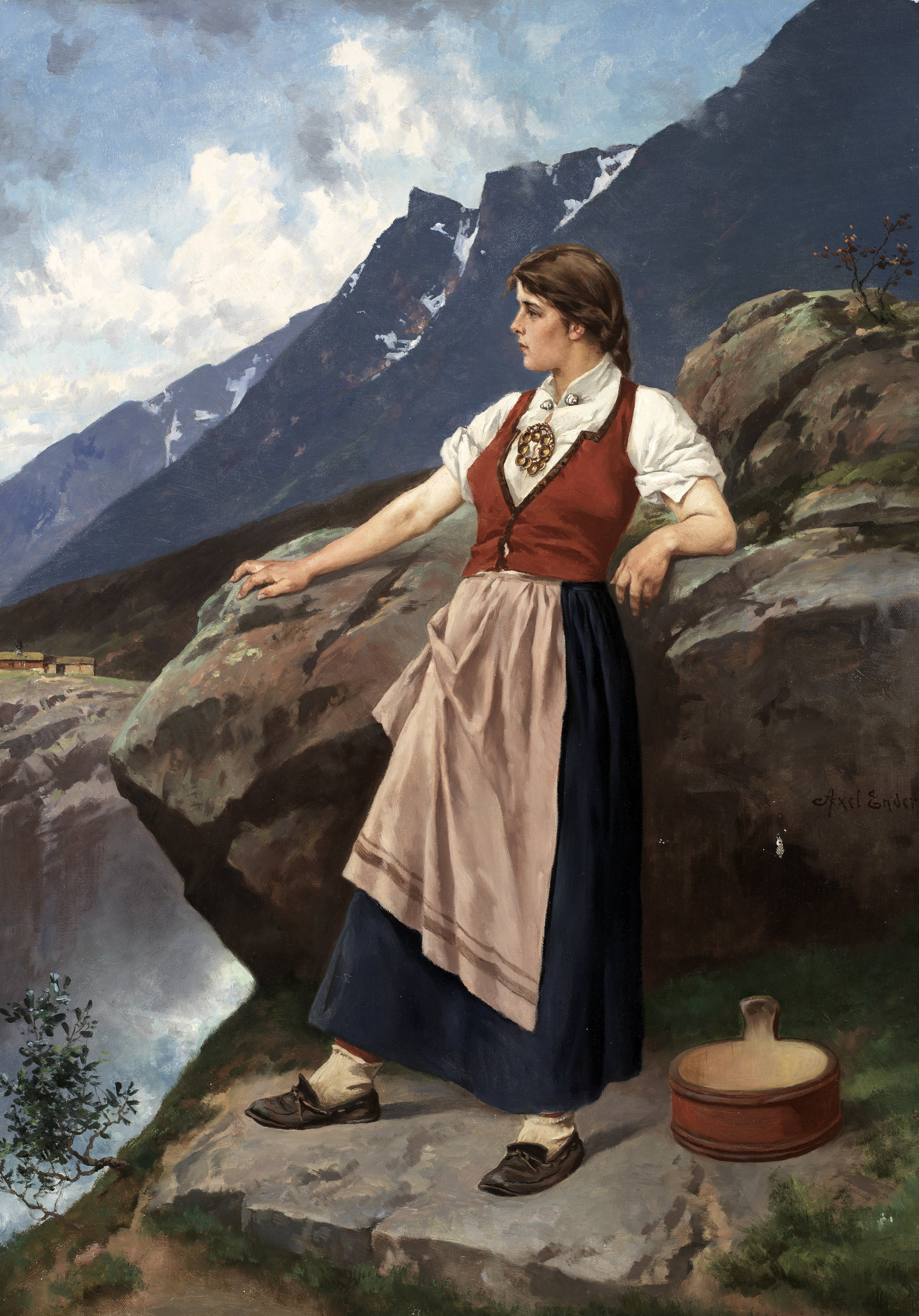
Young Woman at an Overlook

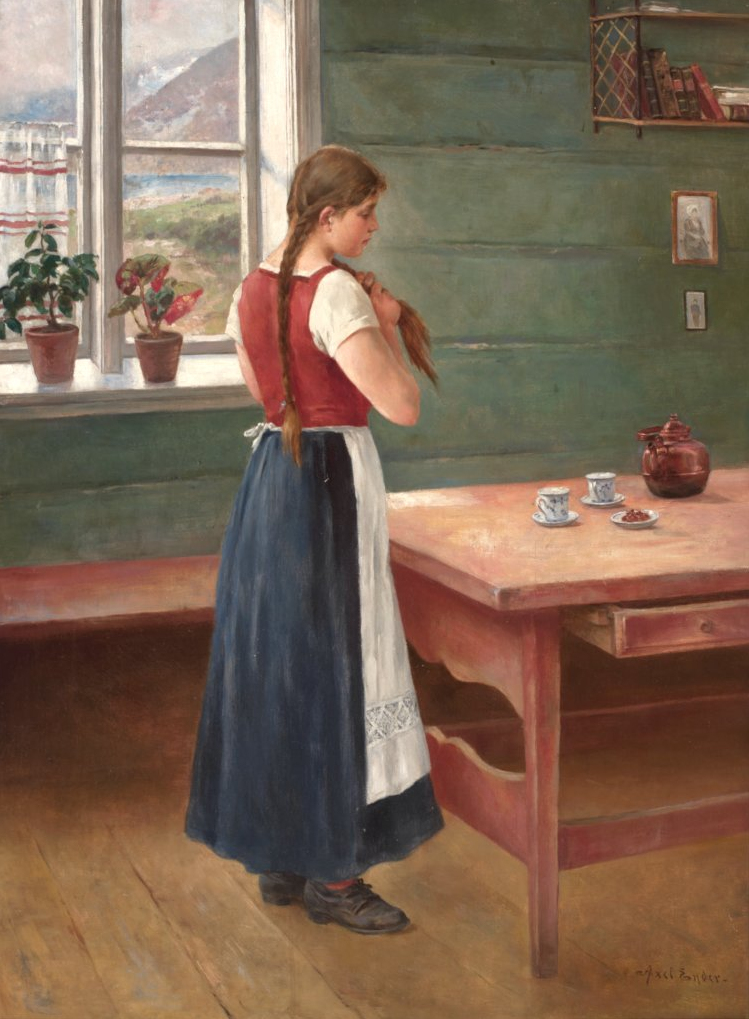
Girl in the kitchen
