= Bekkelaget Church =

Coordinates: 59°53′5.6184″N 10°47′17.671″E

- Bekkelaget kirke
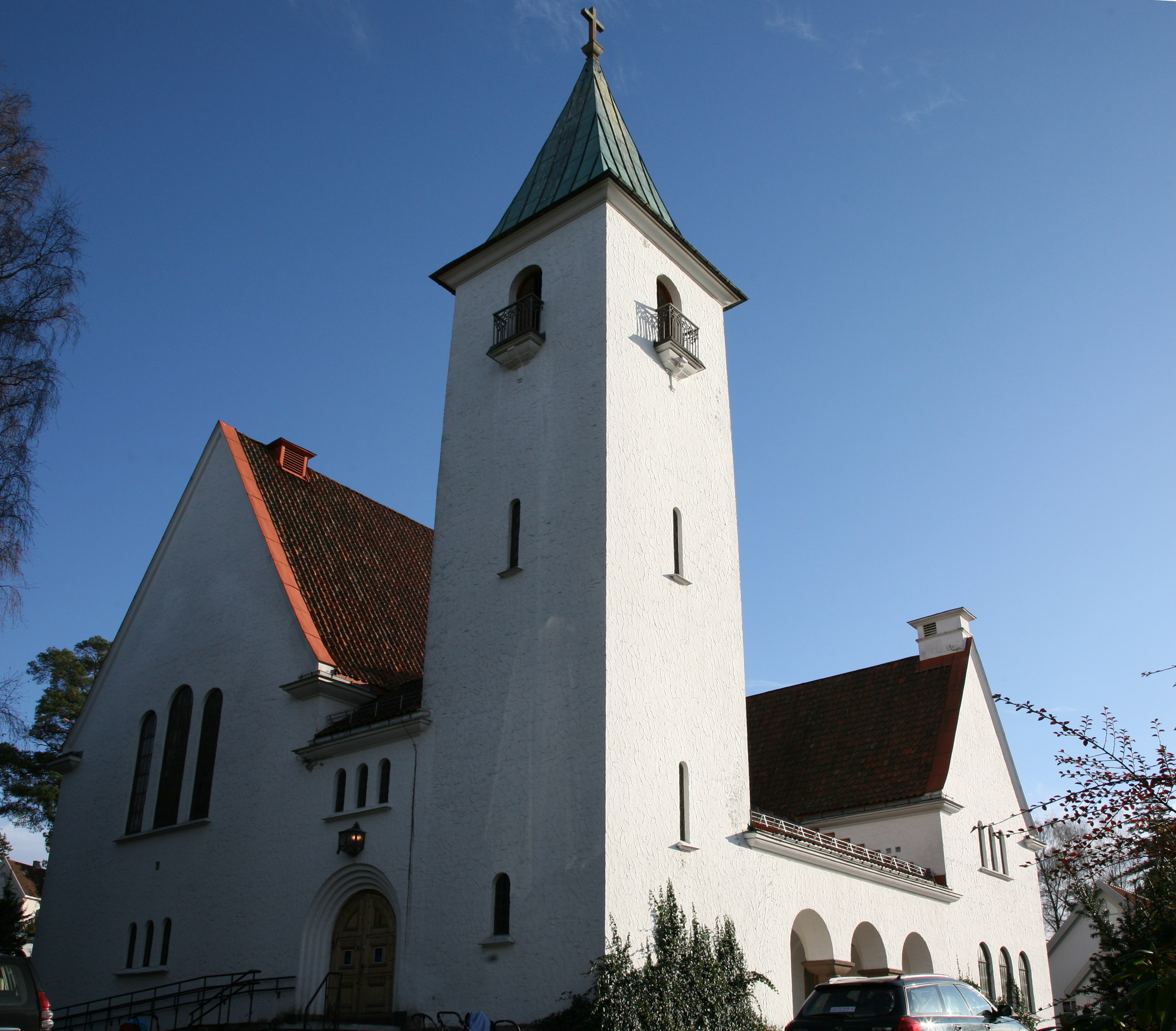

- Location in Oslo Bekkelaget Church (Norway)
- Location: Oslo
- Country: Norway
- Denomination: Church of Norway
- Churchmanship: Evangelical Lutheran

History
- Status: Parish church

Architecture
- Functional status: Active
- Architect: Harald Bødtker
- Completed: 1923

Specifications
- Capacity: 370 or 420
- Materials: Stone

Administration
- Diocese: Diocese of Oslo
- Deanery: Søndre Aker

Bekkelaget Church is a long church (Norwegian: langkirke) located in Bekkelaget in Nordstrand, a district of Oslo, Norway.

The church is built of stone and can accommodate 370 or 420 people. The parish of Bekkelaget was split from the parish of Nordstrand in 1913, and plans for construction of a church began immediately. The municipal architect Harald Bødtker designed the church, and it was consecrated on May 27, 1923. The church has an entrance on the north and choir and apse on the south; its tower stands next to the north gable. Enevold Thømt was responsible for all of the interior decorations and furnishings, giving the church a holistic character. The 21-voice organ was created by the Robert Gustavsson organ company in 1986. The church has two church bells from the Olsen Nauen Bell Foundry. In 1937, an urn cemetery was created around the church, and a rectory was built in the corner of this in 1970.

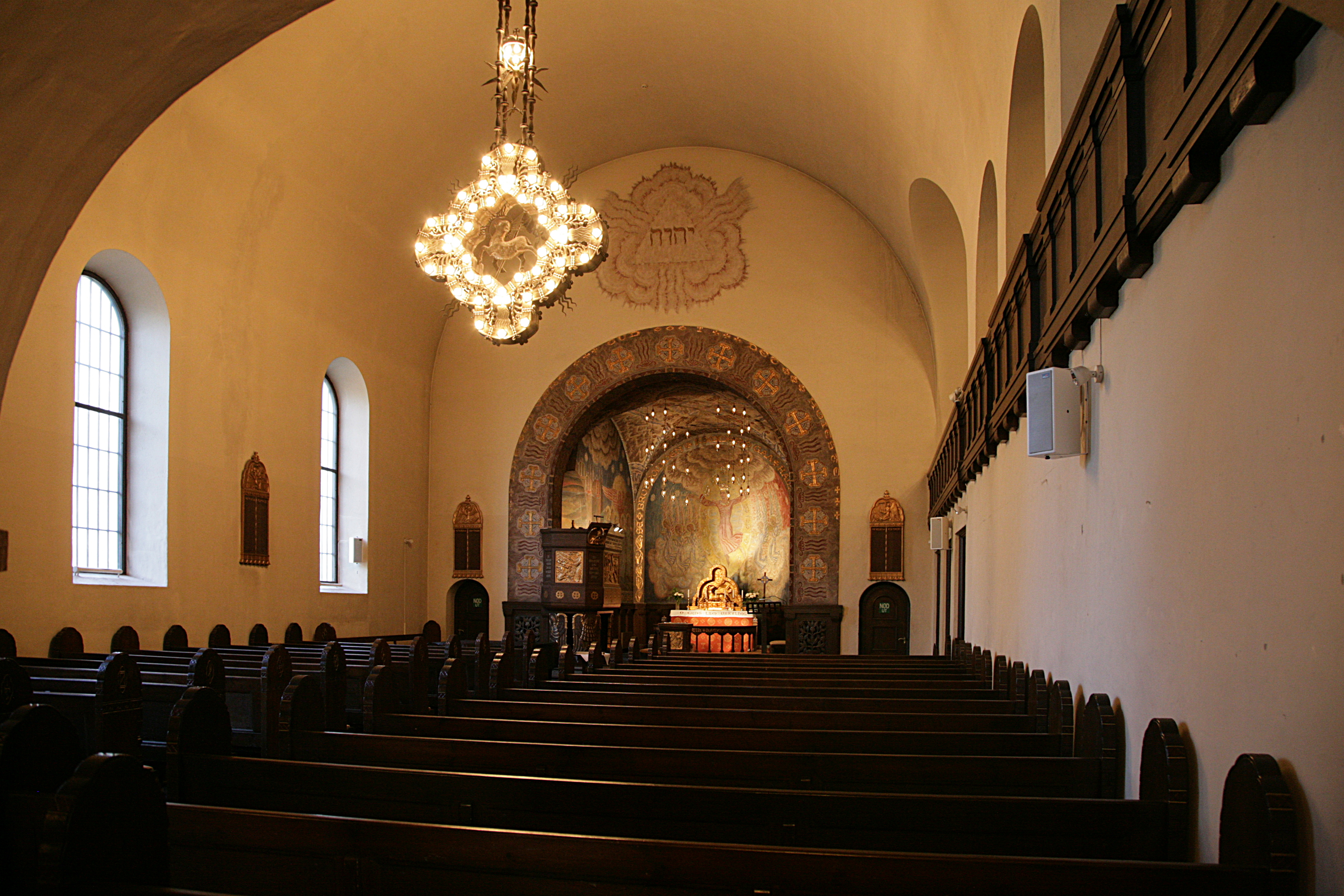
Nave facing the chancel with decoration by Enevold Thømt

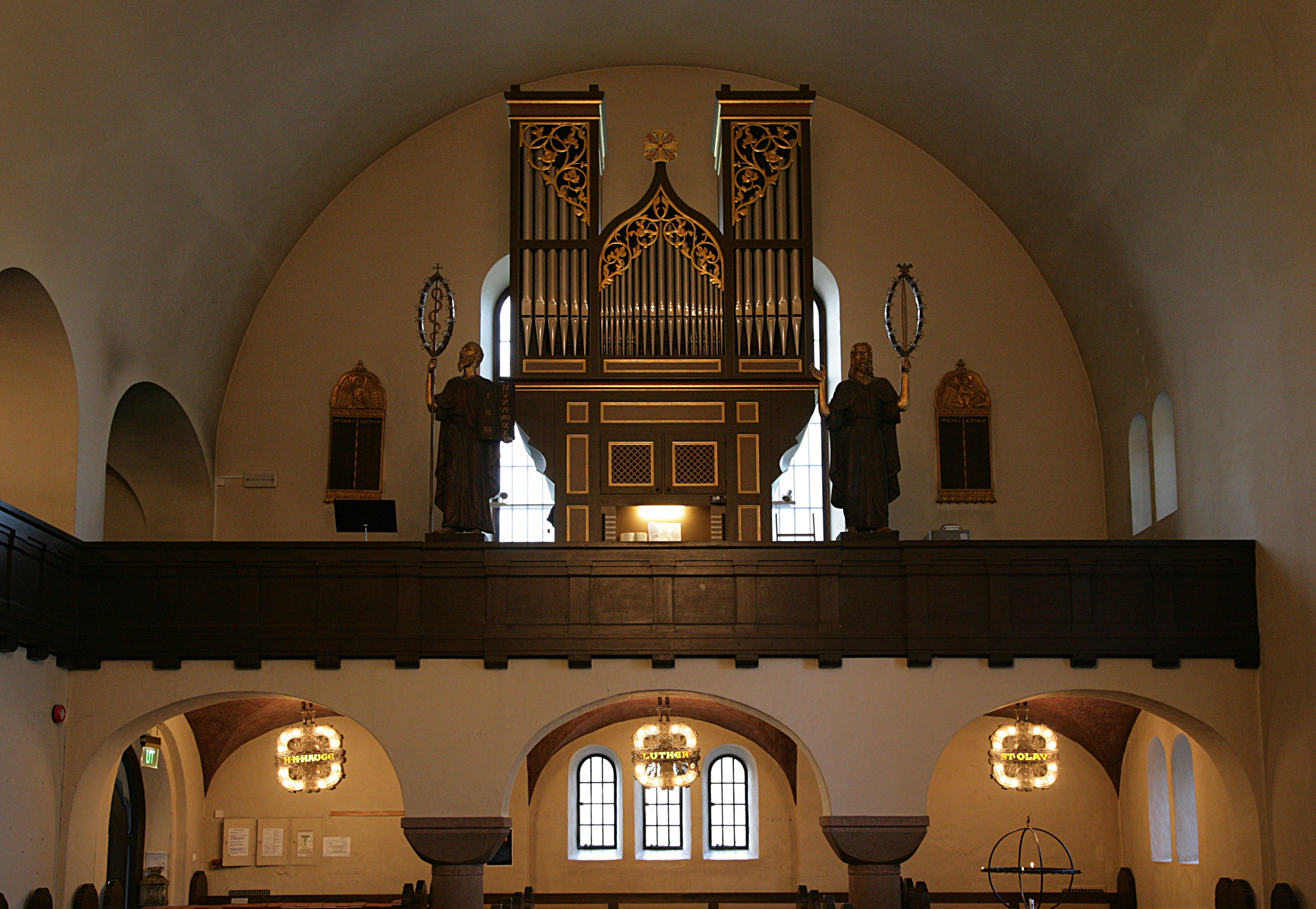
The organ
