= Enevold Thømt =

Norwegian painter

Martin Enevold Thømt
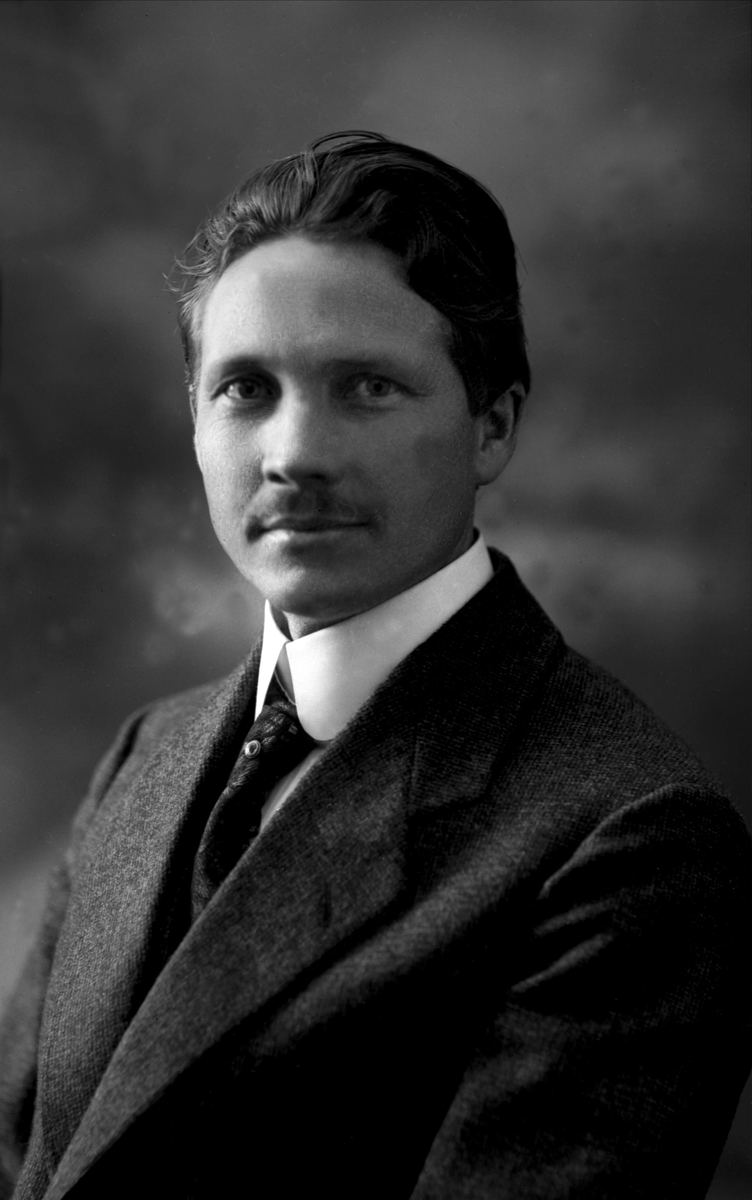
- Born: June 8, 1878; Askim
- Died: June 21, 1958 (aged 80); Oslo
- Known for: Painter
- Notable work: Ålesund Church
- Spouse: Inga Kristin Jødahl

Martin Enevold Thømt (June 8, 1878 – June 21, 1958) was a Norwegian decorative painter.

== Life and work ==
Thømt was born in Askim, the son of Karl P. Thømt and Julie Nygaard Thømt. He was responsible for decorating many Norwegian churches. Thømt specialized in decorative frescoes that were often inspired by Norwegian folk art, but the colors in Thømt's frescoes were usually far more subdued and the number of colors more limited than seen in folk art.

He was apprenticed to the decorative painter Wilhelm Krogh in Oslo from 1897 to 1900. From 1900 to 1903 he studied at the Norwegian National Academy of Craft and Art Industry in Oslo under Oscar Wergeland, Wilhelm Krogh, Asmund Stray, and Eivind Nielsen. In 1903 he studied at the Royal and Imperial State Trade School in Vienna, and around 1907 he spent time studying in Finland and Denmark. He also made many study trips to other European countries.

Thømt was awarded a scholarship from the Houen Fund for artistic decorative painting three times. In 1903, he received the state artisans' scholarship. He married Inga Kristin Jødahl in 1906.

He worked as a decorative painter in Oslo from 1910 onward and had his own studio for stained glass and electric glass making. He founded and headed the School of Norwegian Ornamental Art (Norwegian: Skolen for norsk prydkunst) and was also teacher for some time at the Norwegian National Academy of Craft and Art Industry. In Oslo he carried out many church ornamentation projects, including at Saint Mark's Church, Kampen Church, and Bekkelaget Church—his own parish church. Around 1915 he was commissioned to decorate the Main Building of the Norwegian University of Science and Technology at Gløshaugen in Trondheim. He also decorated private homes in Oslo and Trondheim, but the largest share of his works were frescoes and stained glass in various churches. The decoration of Ålesund Church is considered one of his major accomplishments. The first part of this project, the brown and yellow frieze in the chancel, was completed in 1918. The frescoes on the chancel vault itself and the west wall were executed between 1918 and 1928, and stylistically blend Art Nouveau with Arts and Crafts. In 1938 he started working on the stained glass in the large windows in the church's nave. These were installed in 1946.

Thømt died in Oslo.

== Examples of Thømt's work ==
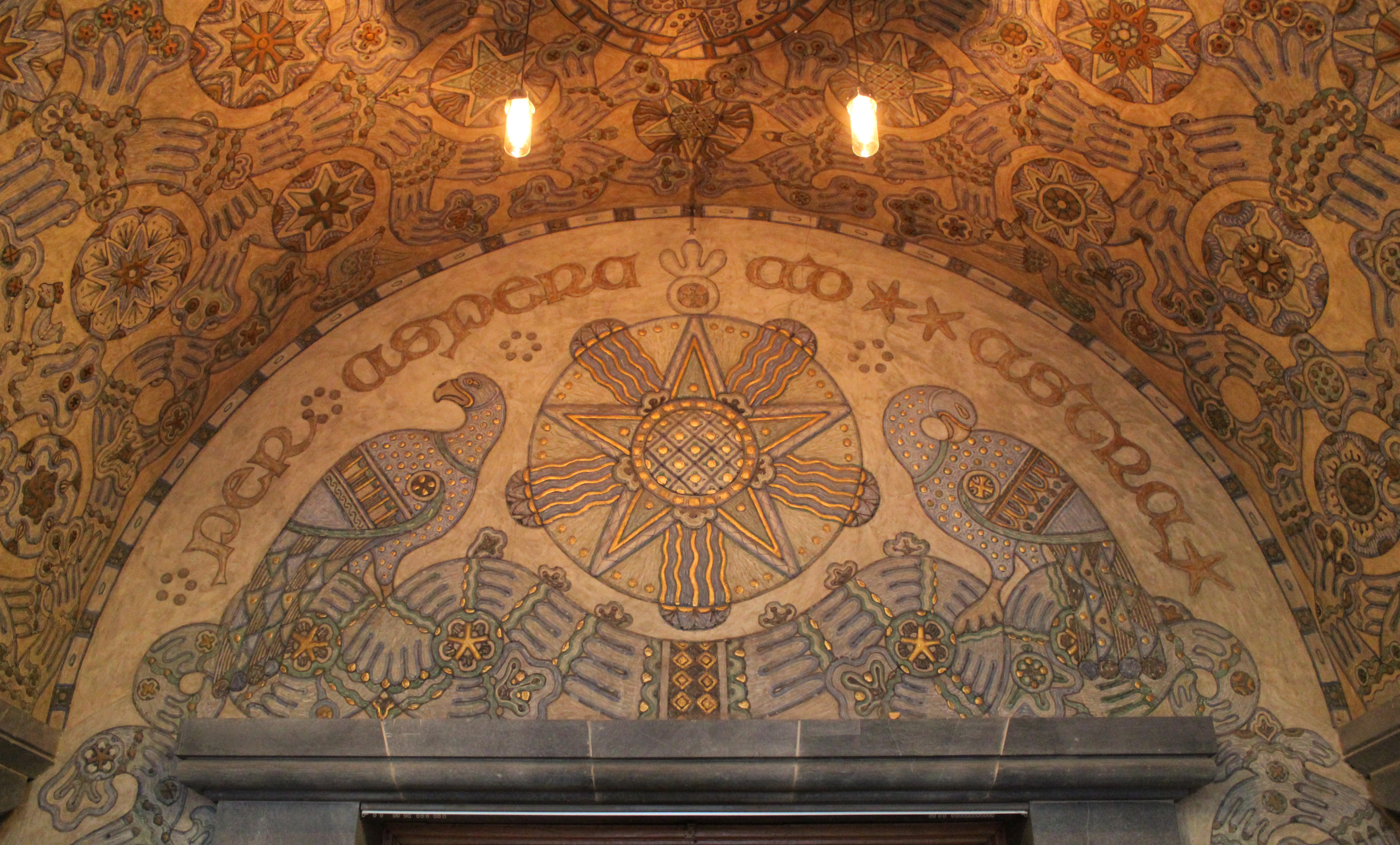
Main Building, Norwegian University of Science and Technology

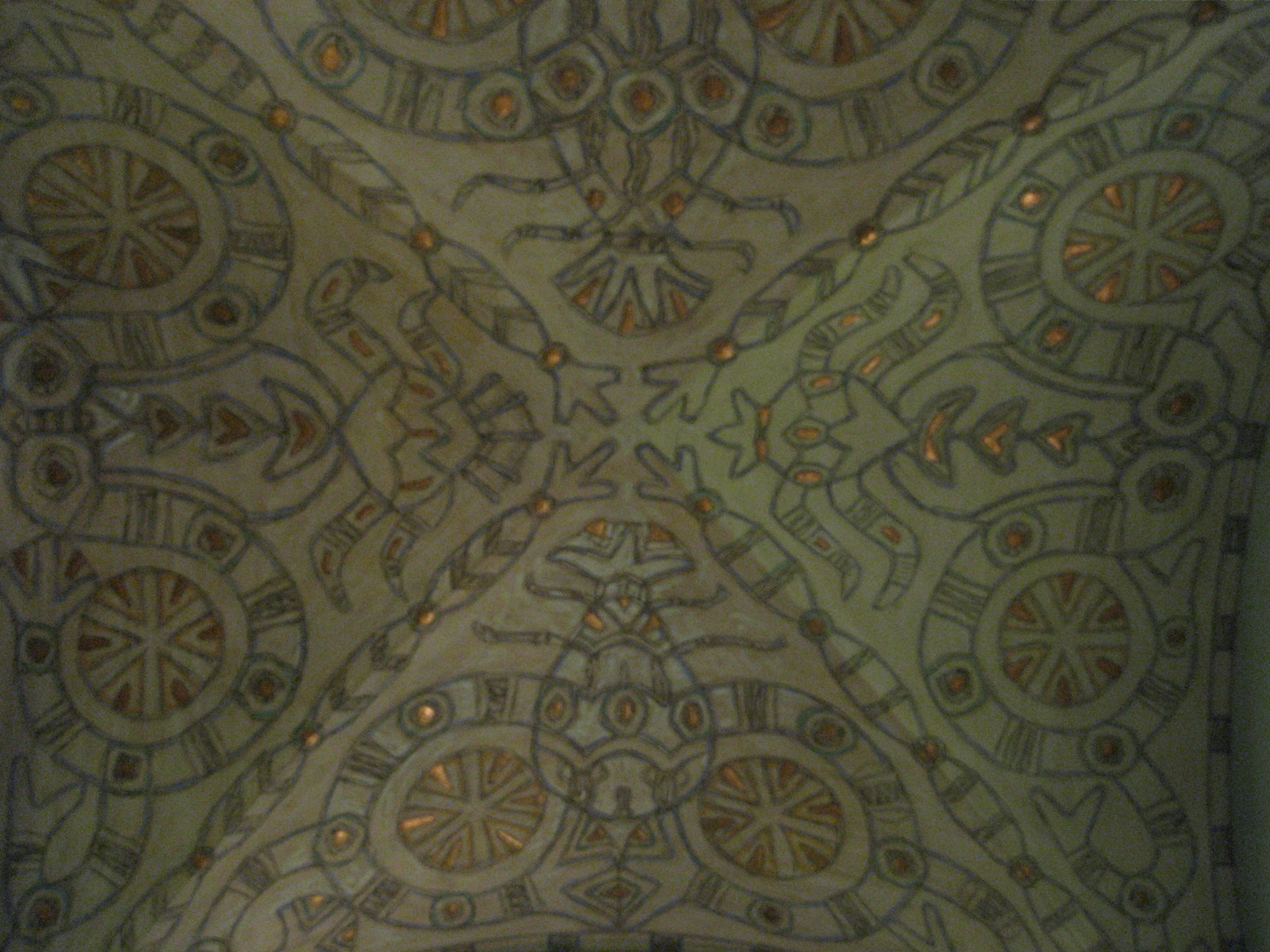
Main Building, Norwegian University of Science and Technology

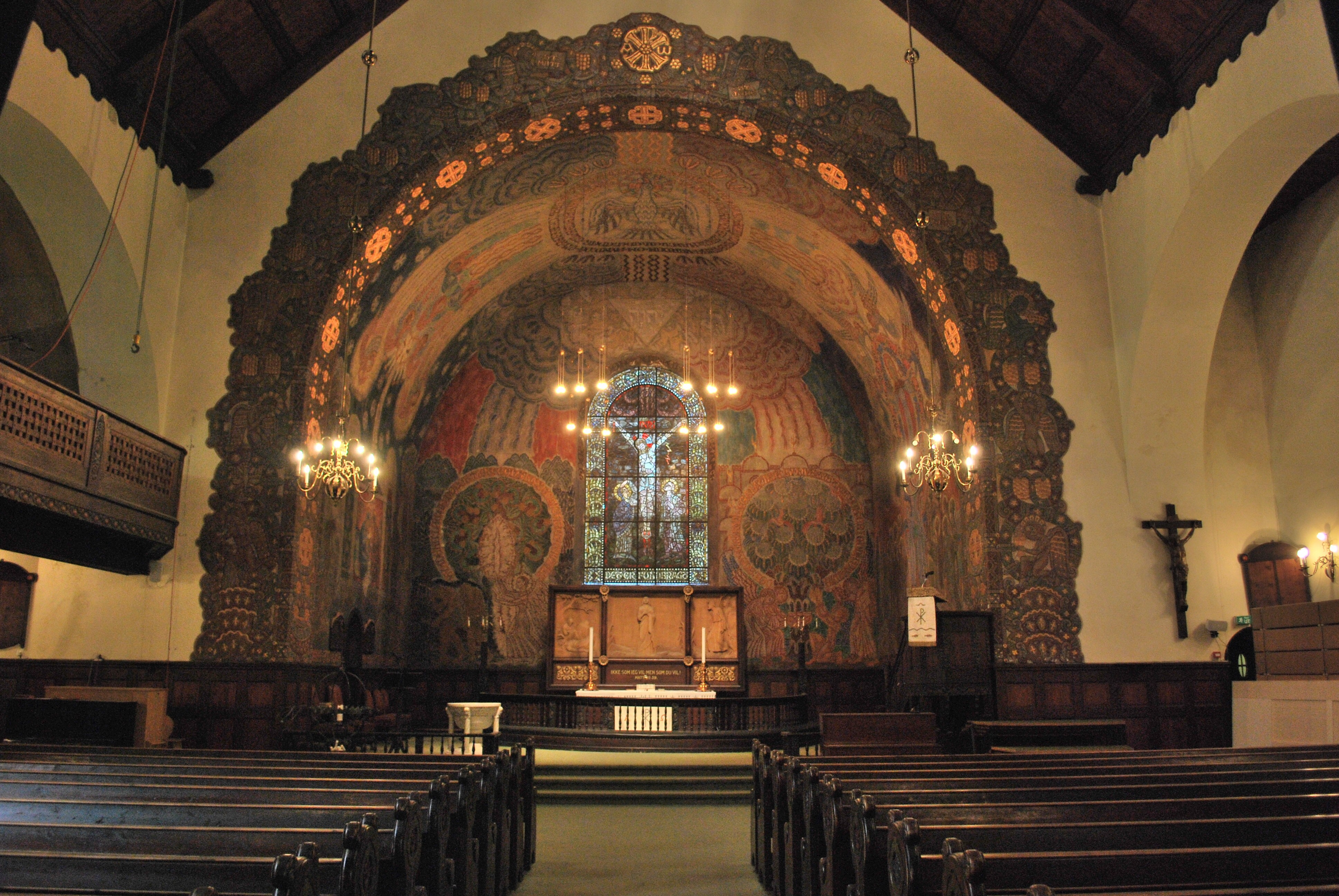
Ålesund Church

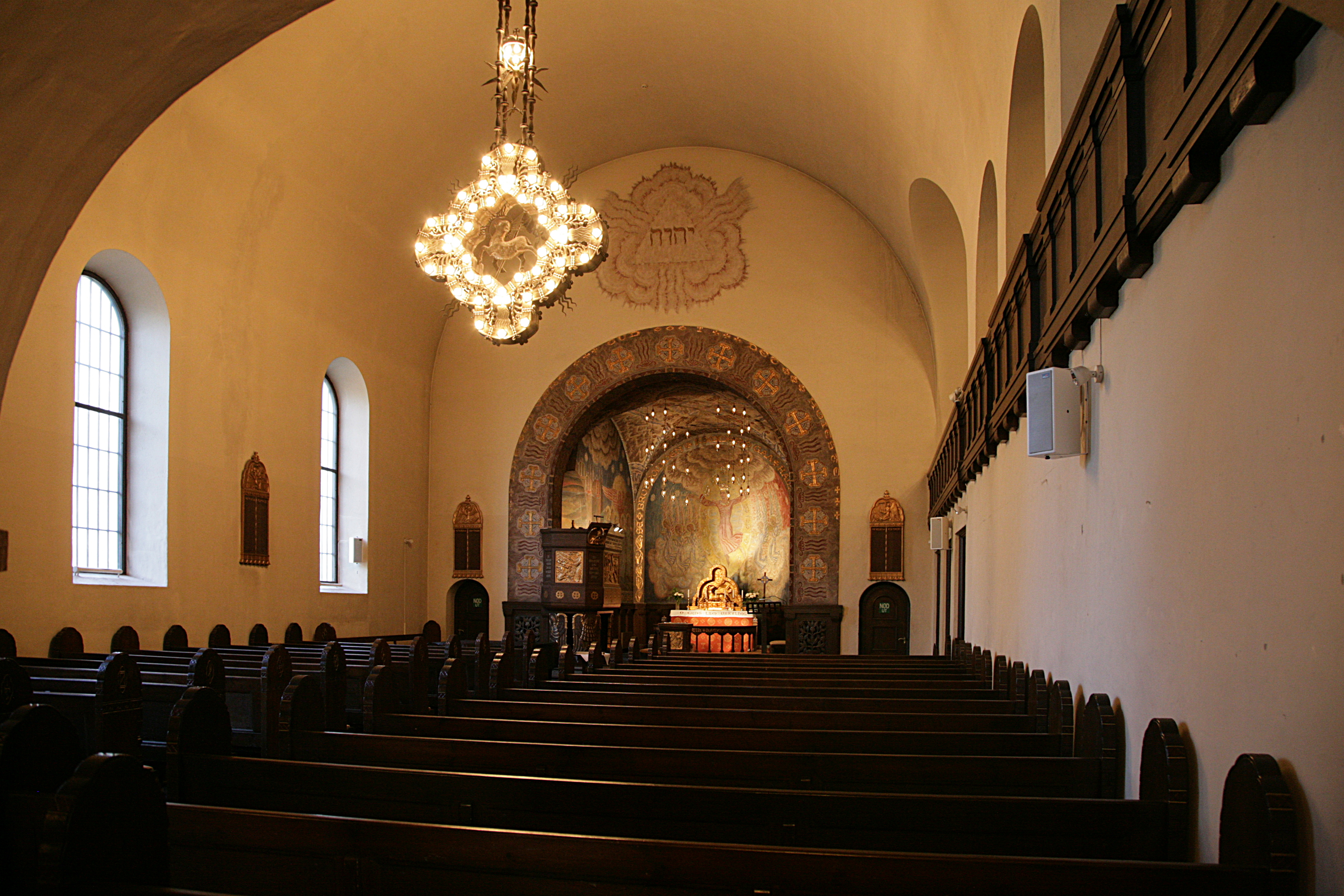
Bekkelaget Church
