= Ullern Church (Oslo) =

Coordinates: 59°55′32″N 10°39′17″E

- Ullern kirke
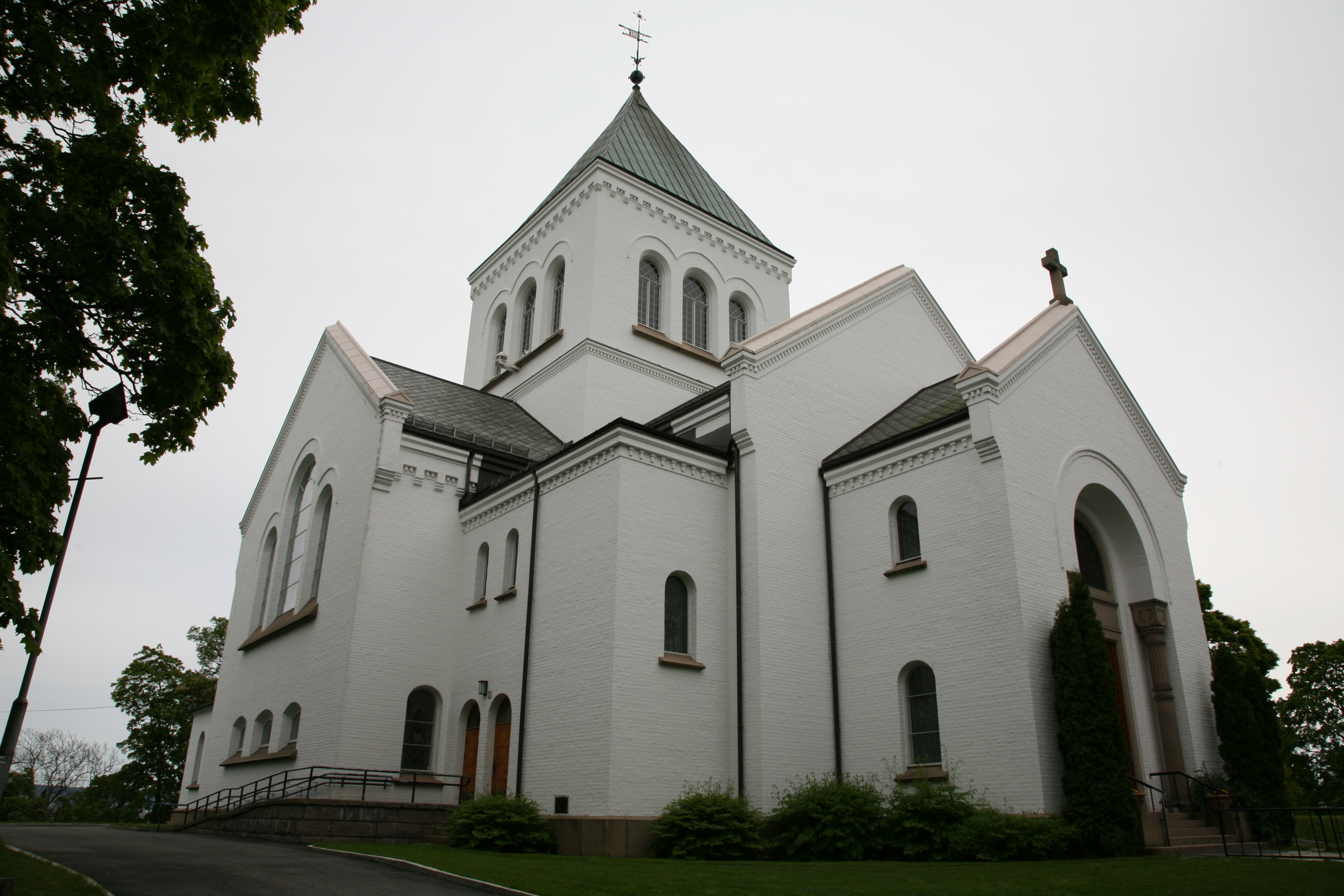

- Location in Oslo Ullern Church (Norway)
- Location: Oslo
- Country: Norway
- Denomination: Church of Norway
- Churchmanship: Evangelical Lutheran

History
- Status: Parish church

Architecture
- Functional status: Active
- Architect: Harald Bødtker
- Architectural type: Romanesque
- Completed: 1903

Specifications
- Capacity: 800
- Materials: Stone

Administration
- Diocese: Oslo
- Deanery: Vestre Aker

Ullern Church (Ullern kirke) is a cruciform Romanesque church on the Holgerslyst property in the Ullern borough of Oslo, Norway. It is the parish church for the Ullern congregation in the Vestre Aker Deanery of the Diocese of Oslo.

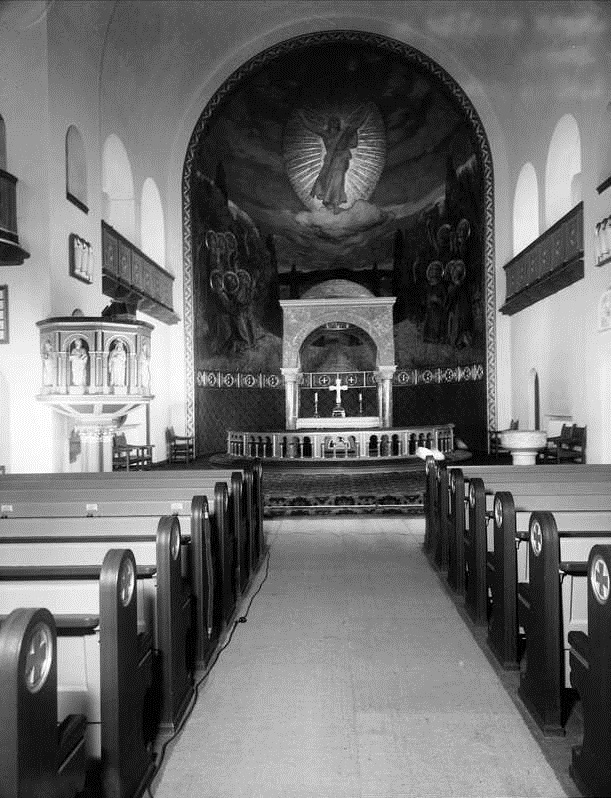
Interior of Ullern Church, 1939

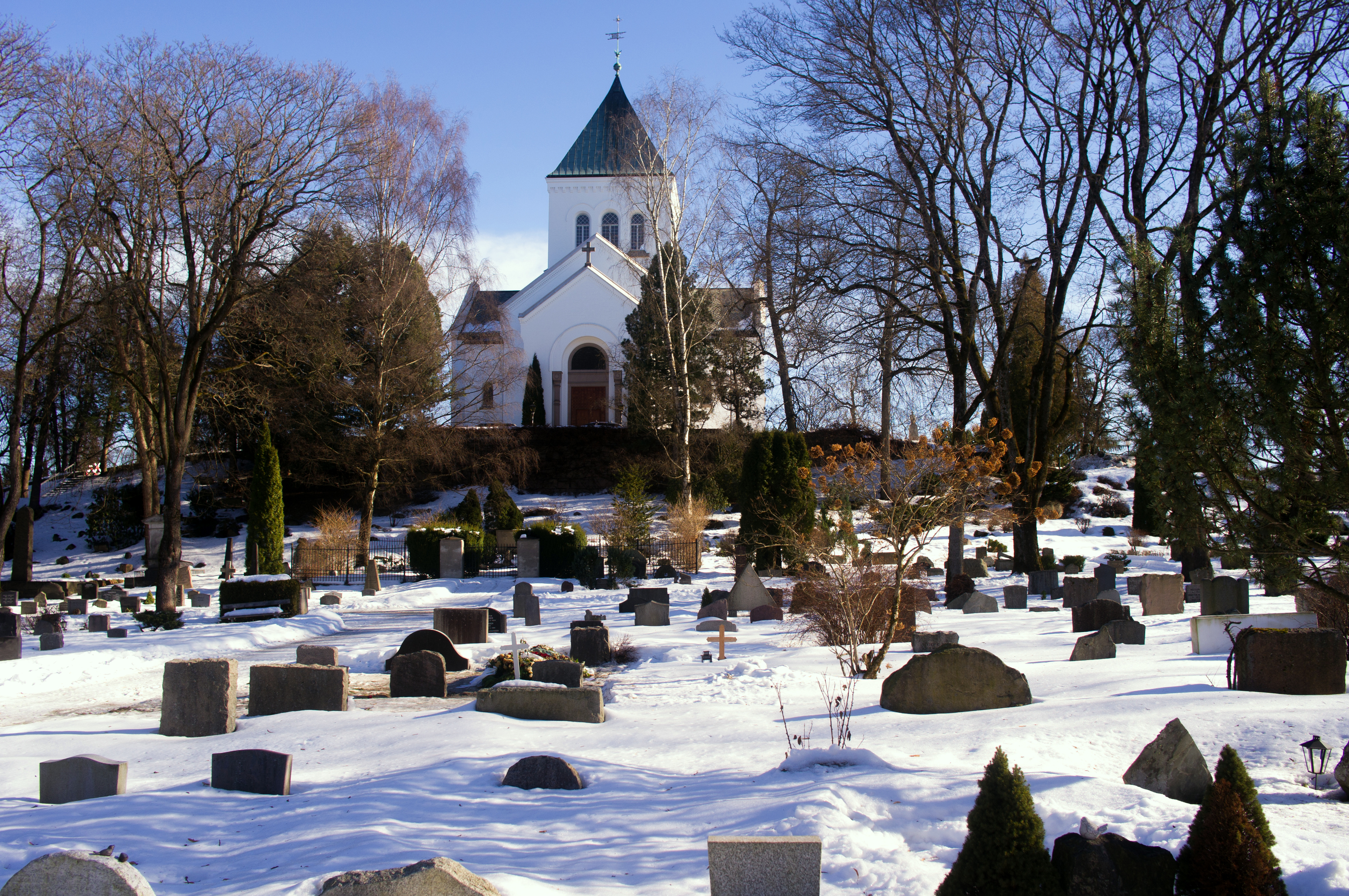
Cemetery at Ullern Church

== History ==
The church is built of stone in 1903 and has seating for 800 people. The cruciform structure is dominated by an imposing central tower. The tower is square and has three windows on each side. It is topped by a tall hip roof covered in copper. The church was designed by the architect Harald Bødtker. The original plans for the church had been drawn up by Georg Andreas Bull, Oslo's city surveyor. The plans were reworked by the architect Johan Storm Munch (1862-1947) in 1899 and approved by the municipality. The drawings were lost that year, when the farm where Munch had his office burned down. The assignment then went to Harald Bødtker, who had just been hired as the municipal architect in Aker.

== Interior ==
The church is dominated by its choir apse with the fresco The Ascension, painted by Eilif Peterssen in 1908–1909. It was created in close collaboration with Domenico Erdmann. Over the altar, in front of the fresco, is a marble baldachin designed by Bødtker. The pulpit was also designed by Bødtker, and the baptismal font is from the company Johs Grønseth & Co. The stained glass dates from 1915 to 1915; it was designed and created by various artists, including Gabriel Kielland and Karl Kristiansen (1886–1971).

== Cemetery ==
The church yard contains a cemetery (Ullern kirkegård) which is the final resting place to a number of notable Norwegian citizens including Håkon Christie, Chrix Dahl, Thorbjørn Egner, Carl Otto Løvenskiold and Nic Schiøll.

== Other sources ==
- Berit Harnæs Sivesind, ed. (2002) Fra landsted til kirkested: Ullern kirke og menighet gjennom 100 år: 1903–2003. (Ullern: Ullern menighetsråd)
