= Harald Bødtker =

Norwegian architect

Harald Waldemar Bødtker
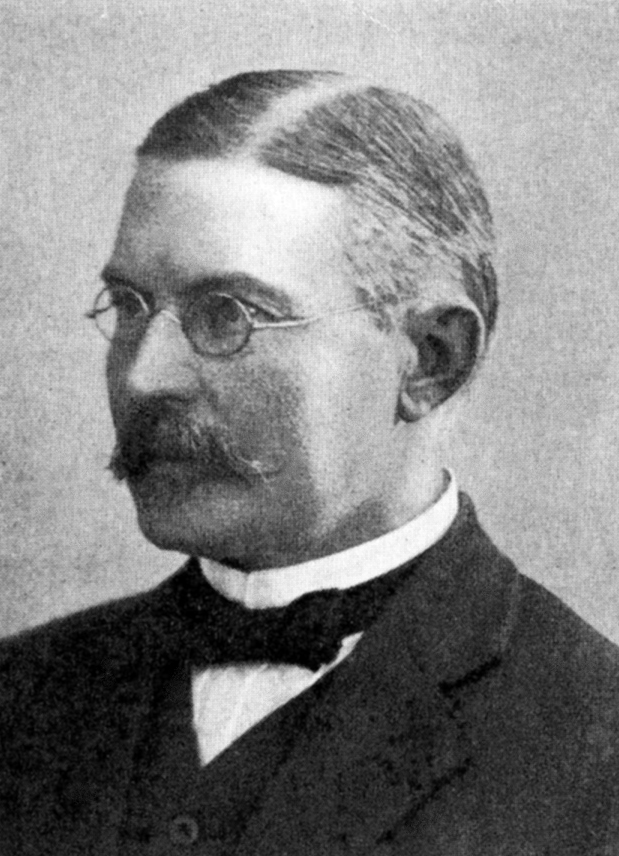
- Born: May 10, 1855; Namdalen, Norway
- Died: March 12, 1925 (aged 69); Oslo, Norway
- Occupation: Architect

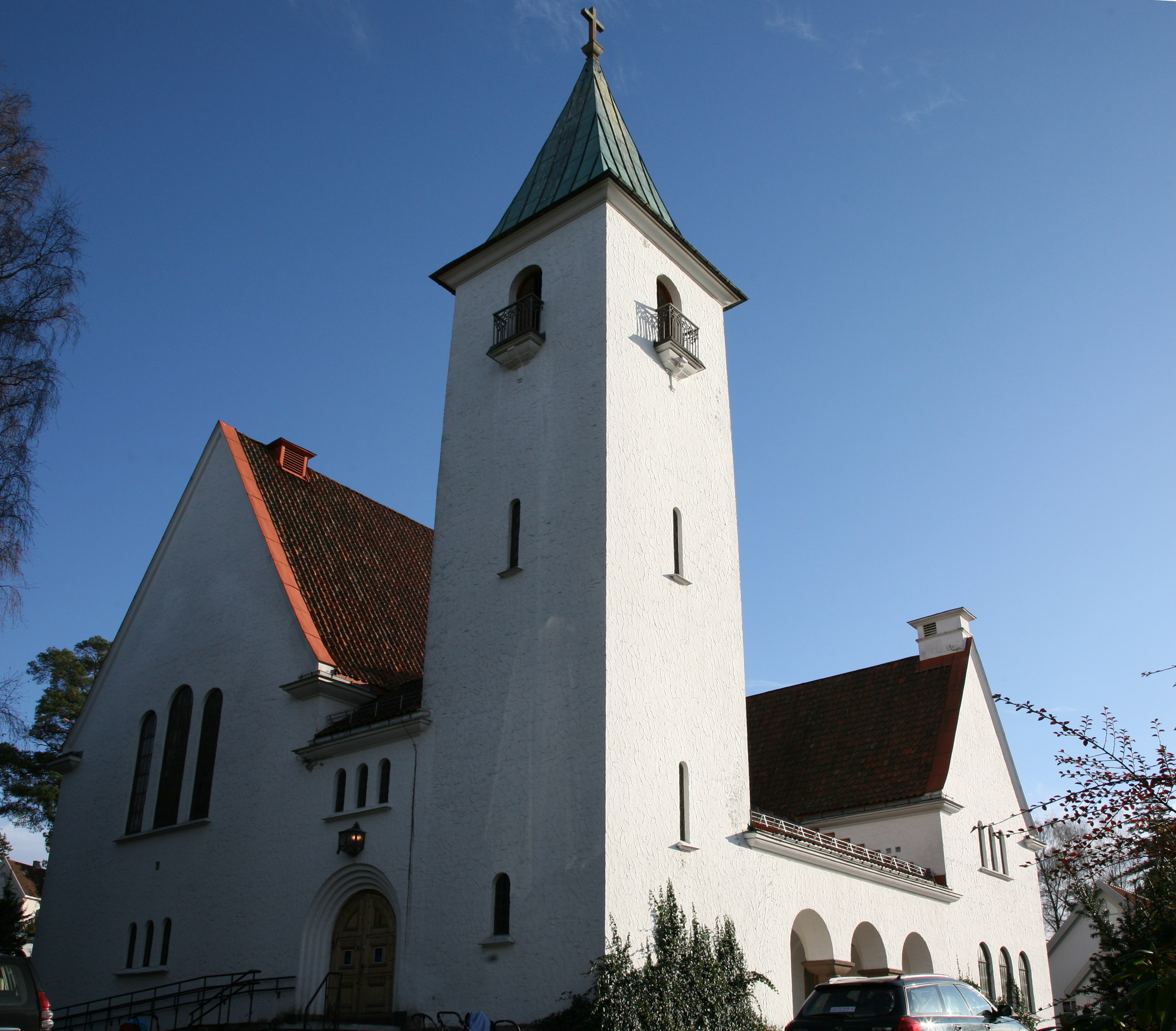
Bekkelaget Church

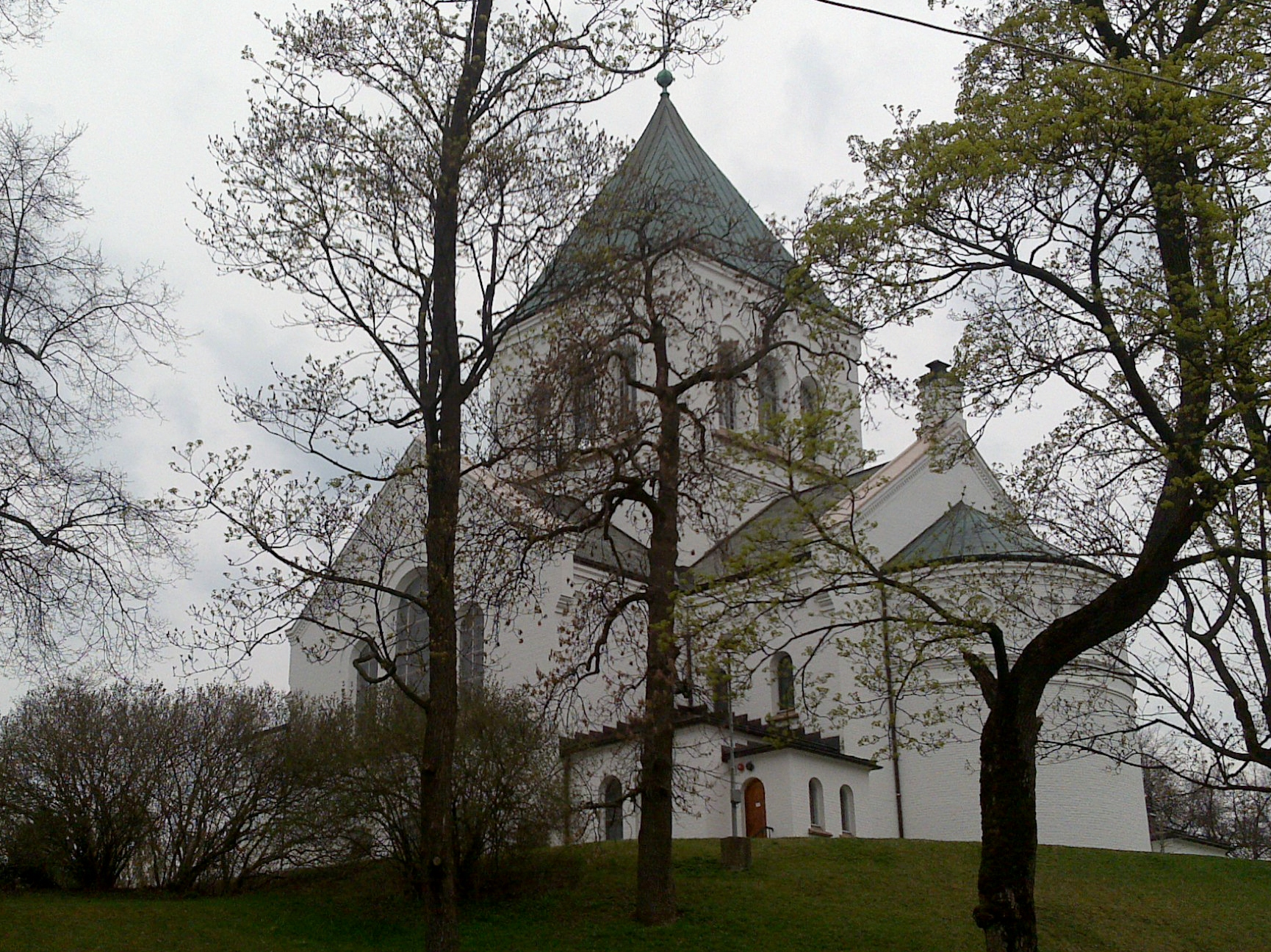
Ullern Church

Harald Waldemar Bødtker (May 10, 1855 – March 12, 1925) was a Norwegian architect.

== Biography ==
Bødtker was born at Overhalla Municipality in Nord-Trøndelag, Norway. He was raised in the Namdalen valley. He started his career as an assistant for architects Henrik Nissen and Holm Munthe in Kristiania (now Oslo). He attended the Academy of Fine Arts Vienna where he studied under Danish born architect Theophilus Hansen from 1880 to 1883. He then worked as assistant to Theophilus Hansen in Vienna until around 1889. Bødtker worked at German based architectural offices in Buenos Aires and Rio de Janeiro from 1890 to 1892. He then spent time as construction manager in Petrópolis which was the summer residence of the Brazilian Emperors and aristocrats in the 19th century.

In 1896, he opened his own architectural practice at Kristiania. Bødtker was the municipal architect for Aker Municipality from 1899 to 1923 and was involved in designing a number of churches and especially schools in what is now Oslo. Among his extensive work were additions to Aker University Hospital completed between 1917 and 1922. He died in Oslo.

== Selected works ==
- Grorud Church (1900–1902)
- Grefsen Chapel at Grefsen Church (1901–1904)
- Ullern Church (1904)
- University Hall at the University of Oslo (1909–1911, together with Holger Sinding-Larsen)
- Bekkelaget Church (1920–1923)
- Gjerpen Church (rebuilt 1921)
