= Kampen Church, Oslo =

Kampen Church
- Kampen kirke
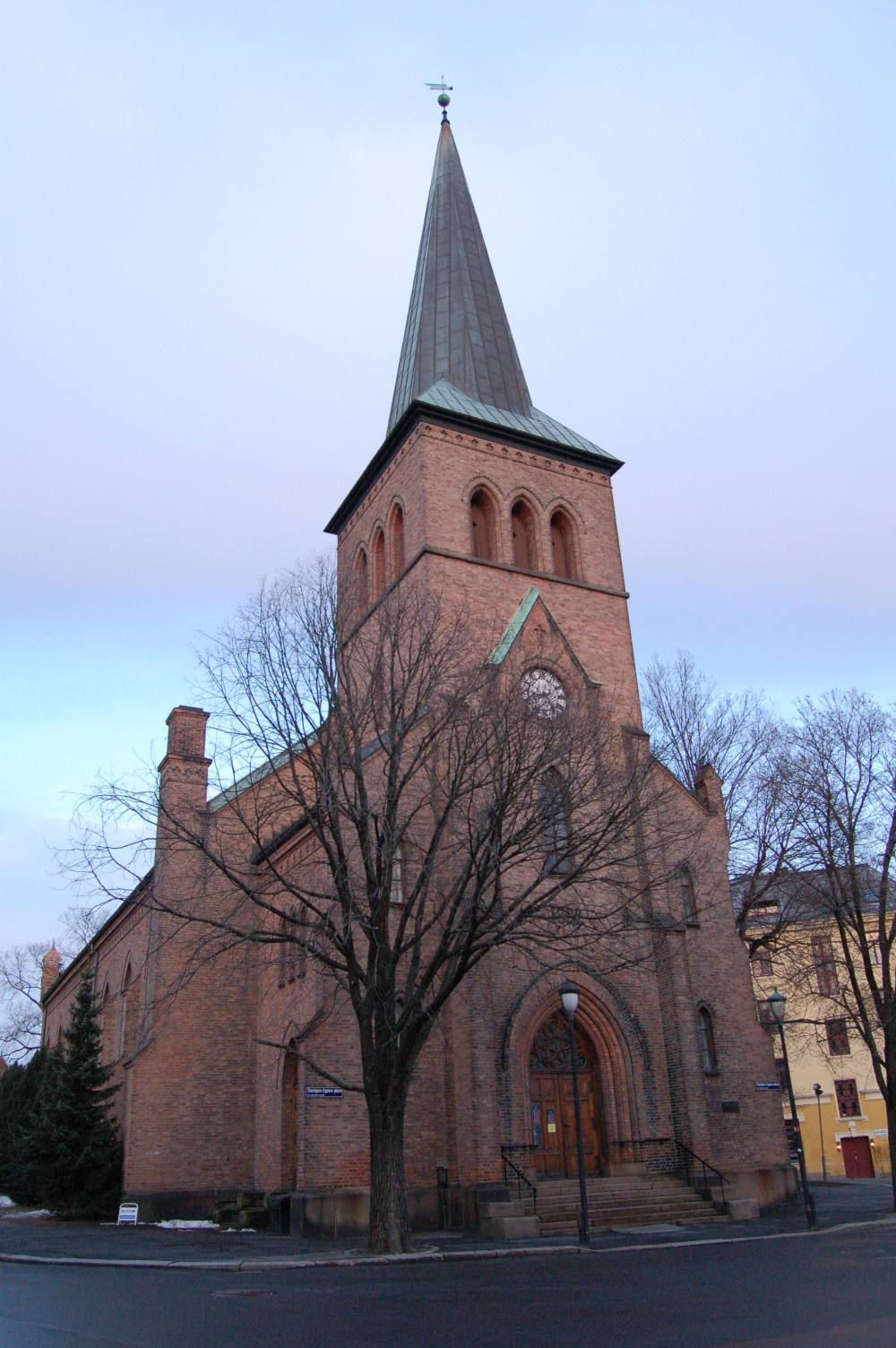

- Location within Oslo Location within Norway
- 59°54′43.020″N 10°46′55.096″E
- Location: Bøgata 1, Oslo,
- Country: Norway
- Denomination: Church of Norway
- Churchmanship: Evangelical Lutheran
- Website: kampenkirke.no

History
- Status: Parish church
- Consecrated: 1882

Architecture
- Functional status: Active
- Architect: Jacob Wilhelm Nordan
- Style: Neo Gothic

Specifications
- Capacity: 480
- Materials: Brick

Administration
- Diocese: Diocese of Oslo
- Parish: Kampen

Kampen Church is a church in Oslo, Norway, in the Kampen area. On 29 November 1882, the church was consecrated. Following a fire in Kampen in 1878, a new church became part of the neighborhood's restoration plans. A new congregation was established in the neighborhood in 1880, but it gathered elsewhere until the church finished its construction.

The church is constructed from brick and has 480 seats. The church's architect was Jacob Wilhelm Nordan. The church tower is covered in copper sheet. The altarpiece of the church depicts two women at Jesus's empty grave on Easter morning and was created in 1884 by the Norwegian painter and sculptor Axel Ender and was restored in 1913. Above four of the church's interior doors, there are symbols of the four Gospels conducted by Enevold Thømt in 1913. The church is adorned with twelve large and six small stained glass windows and two rosette windows of the front doors, created by Peer Lorentz Dahl. The Madonna sculpture in marble (located on the Church porch) is created by sculptor Knut Steen in 1992.

The church has legal protection and is listed by the Norwegian Directorate for Cultural Heritage.

== Gallery ==
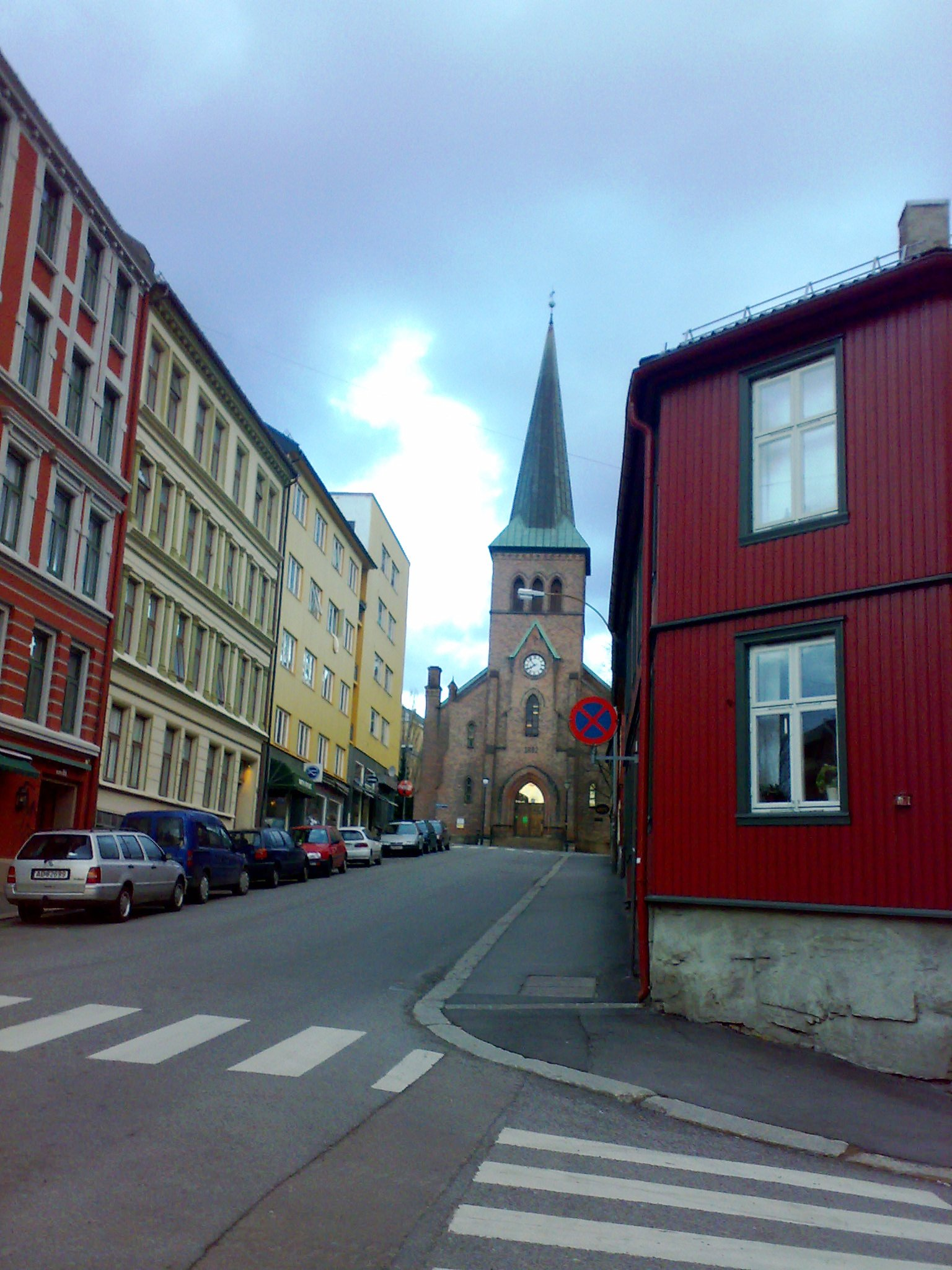
The church's location in Kampen

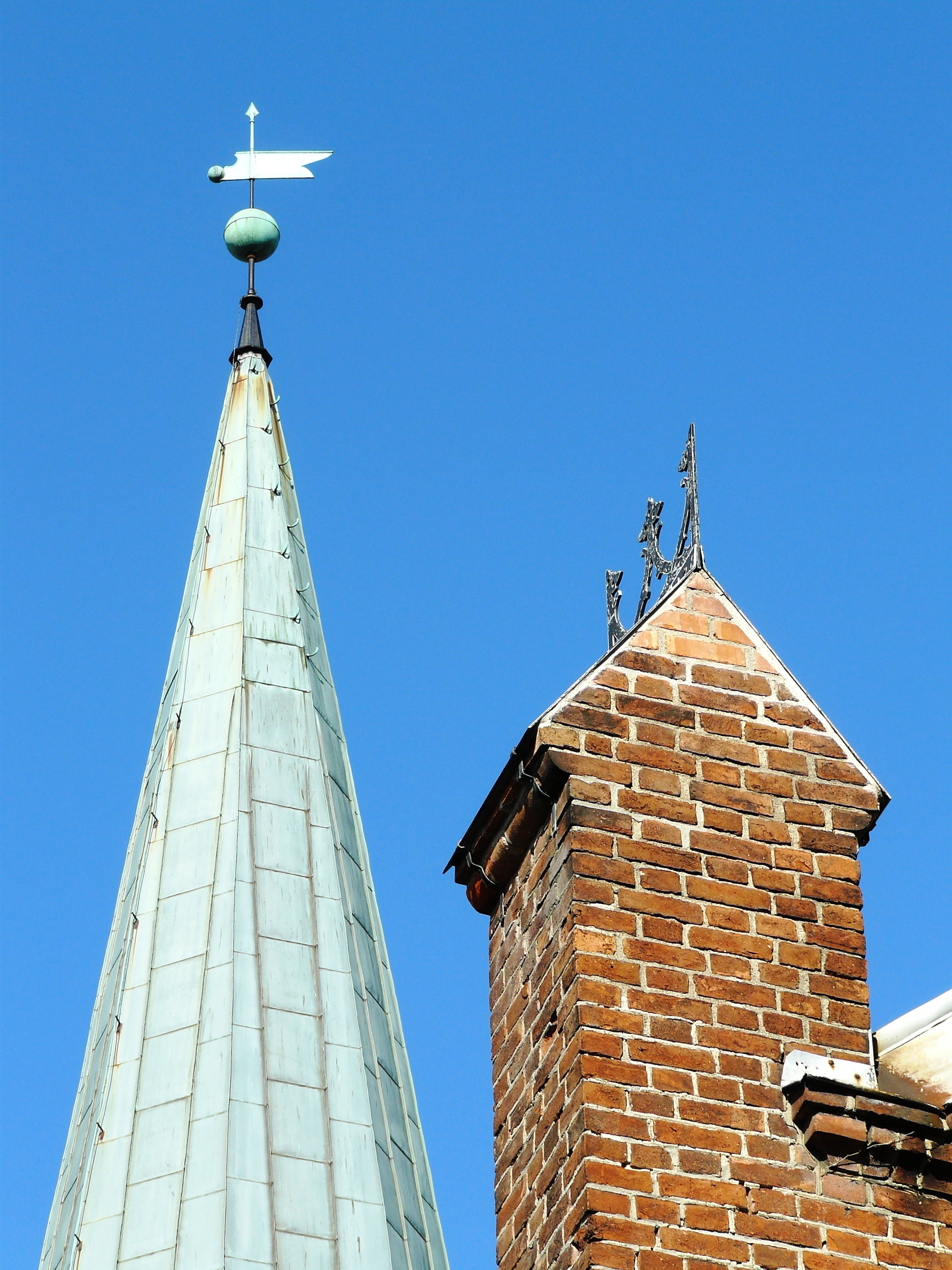
Church spire and bell tower (detail)

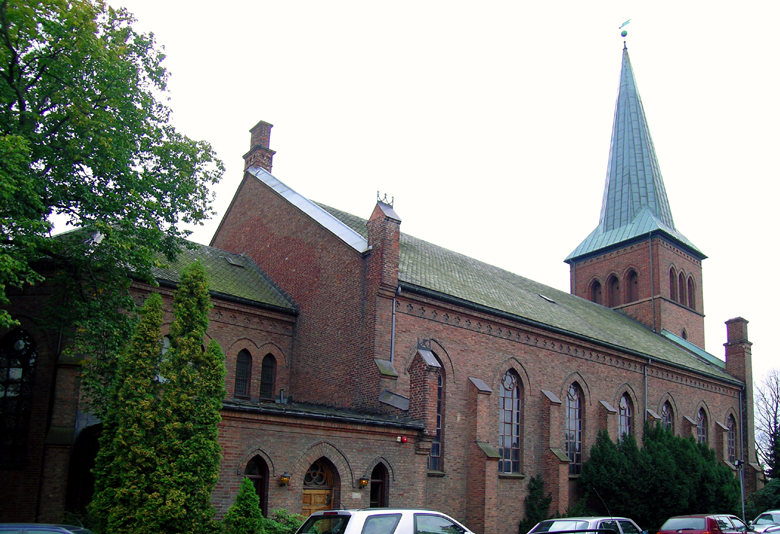
The church viewed from the northeast
