= Per Steenberg =

Norwegian organist and composer

Peder Steenberg (March 17, 1870 – June 28, 1947) was a Norwegian organist and composer from Nedre Eiker, best known for his church music.

== Life and career ==
Steenberg graduated from the Oslo Music Conservatory and also studied abroad in Leipzig, Berlin, and Copenhagen. In Norway, he served as the organist at Vålerenga Church (1902–1927) and at Saint Mark's Church (1927–1940). For several decades he taught vocal polyphony and counterpoint at the Oslo Conservatory of Music and at the teachers' college and school for the blind in Oslo. His compositions include religious cantatas and choral music, as well as organ music such as preludes, fugues, organ chorales, and similar. A stay in Denmark put him in touch with Thomas Laub, and Steenberg prepared an unauthorized hymnal that was published in 1947 as an innovative alternative to the official hymnal of 1926; it was based on Ludvig Mathias Lindeman's hymnal and was edited by music authorities including Eyvind Alnæs, Ole Mørk Sandvik, and Arild Sandvold. Steenberg's hymnal was adopted by enthusiasts such as Ingar Nilsen and Asbjørn Hernes.
