= Grorud Church =

- Grorud kirke
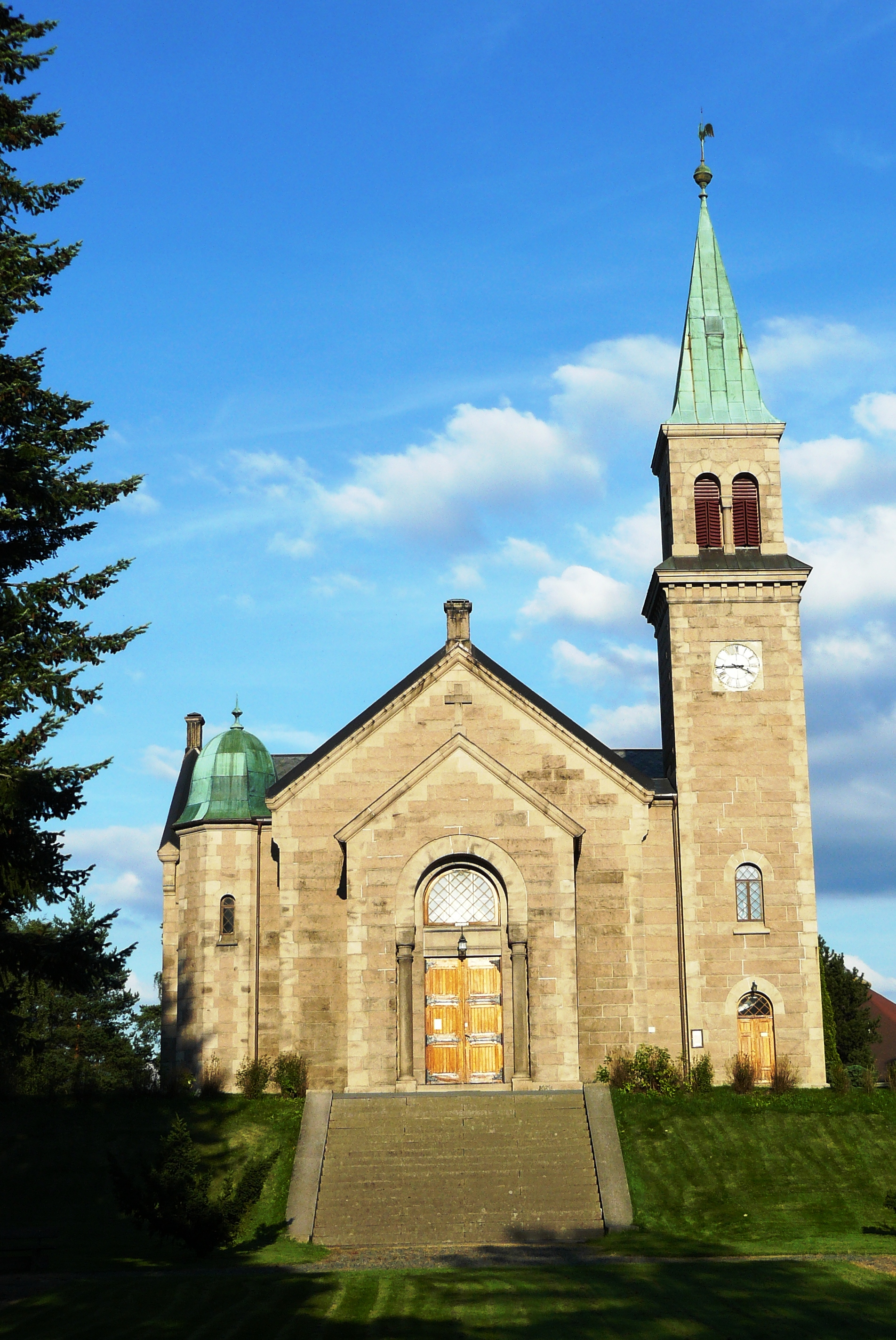
- Grorud Church
- 59°57′28″N 10°53′4″E
- Location: Grorud Valley; Oslo,
- Country: Norway
- Denomination: Church of Norway
- Churchmanship: Evangelical Lutheran
- Website: www.oslo.kirken.no/grorud

History
- Status: Parish church
- Consecrated: 1902

Architecture
- Functional status: Active
- Architect: Harald Bødtker

Specifications
- Materials: Local Grorud Granite

Administration
- Diocese: Diocese of Oslo
- Parish: Grorud

Grorud Church is a cruciform church from 1902 located on the upper Grorud in Grorud in Oslo, Norway. The church is located on a hill and is visible from many parts of the Grorud Valley. The building is made of local Grorud Granite stone (Grefsensyenitt) and has 500 seats. Stone walls' uneven appearance, which gives the wall a live appearance, because the stones varies between roughly hewn uneven surface, and smooth surface. The smooth cut stones are centered on the corners and windows. Minister and landed on Linderud, Christian Pierre Mathiesen, gave the altar and baptismal silver dish to the church.

There is a cemetery in addition to the church.

Grorud Church is listed and protected by law by the Norwegian Directorate for Cultural Heritage.
