= Willy Bakken =

Norwegian musician and writer

Willy Bakken, stage and pen name willy b (24 June 1951 – 23 July 2010) was a Norwegian musician and popular culture writer.

He hailed from Furnes. According to Bakken's own account, he became interested in rock music in 1963. As a guitarist he joined his first band in 1969. He released his first vinyl with the band Stangwolff in 1981. He later played in the mostly female band Crawdaddy Simone from 1983, later The Willy B Review.

In 1983 and 1984 he published two volumes of Norwegian rock history, titled Norge i rock, beat og blues. It has been called a "standard work". He became known for creating "rock family trees" about the fluctuating members of Norwegian rock bands. Bakken has been called a "rock archaeologist", a "rock oracle" and a living encyclopedia on popular culture. He contributed several articles to the biographical dictionary Norsk biografisk leksikon.

He wrote for the comic magazines Fantomet (The Phantom), Agent X9 (Secret Agent X-9) and James Bond-magasinet (James Bond Magazine), the rock magazines Nye Takter from 1977 to 1983 and Rock Furore from 1988 to 1994, later mostly for the daily newspaper Dagbladet and the musical magazine Backstage. He also issued fanzines such as Jello Submarine, and ran his own publishing house Rockarkivet.

In 1994 he released Vakre damer og blodig død about the history of the Norwegian pocket book, and in 1996 he chronicled the publishing of Norwegian popular magazines in the book Drømmenes marked. Fredrik Wandrup had written that Bakken worked like a "professor of B culture". In 1999 he released the essay collection I dovregubbens hall vol. 1, and in 2002 he released the biography Sten Nilsen: Et liv med farger i svart/hvitt, about the book cover designer Sten Nilsen. When he died, he worked on a band biography about Motorpsycho, a chronicle on concerts in Oslo as well as an autobiography. He had also been involved in the opening of the rock museum Rockheim.

He was a Christian, a teetotaler and vegetarian. He lived at Grorud, and died from cancer in July 2010. After his death, a seminar on popular literature was held at the National Library of Norway. To the National Library, Bakken had donated much of his personal library. The collection spanned 2,500 rock albums, 5,000 books and magazines as well as 1,600 other items such as leaflets, posters and postcards. An exhibition of some of these items was held at the National Library between March and April 2011.
