= Grorud =

Borough of Oslo, Norway

Bydel Grorud
- Borough
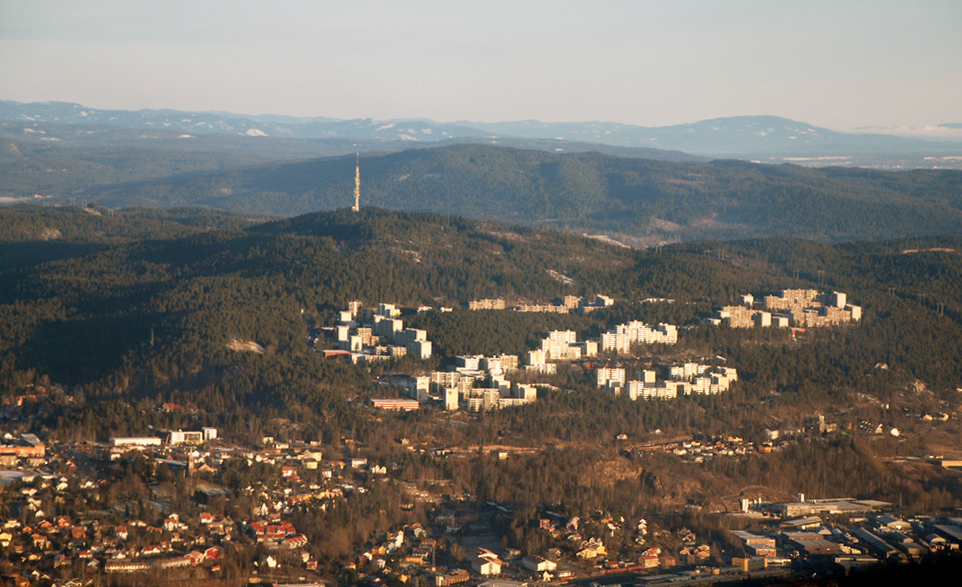

- Coat of arms

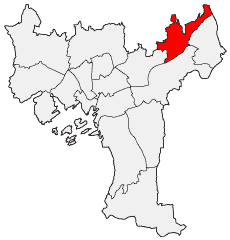
- Coordinates: 59°57′27″N 10°52′51″E
- Country: Norway
- City: Oslo
- District: Grorud Valley

Area
  - Total: 8.2 km^{2} (3.2 sq mi)

Population (2020)
  - Total: 27,707
  - Density: 3,379/km^{2} (8,750/sq mi)
- Time zone: UTC+1 (CET)
  - Summer (DST): UTC+2 (CEST)
- ISO 3166 code: NO-030110
- Website: bydel-grorud.oslo.kommune.no

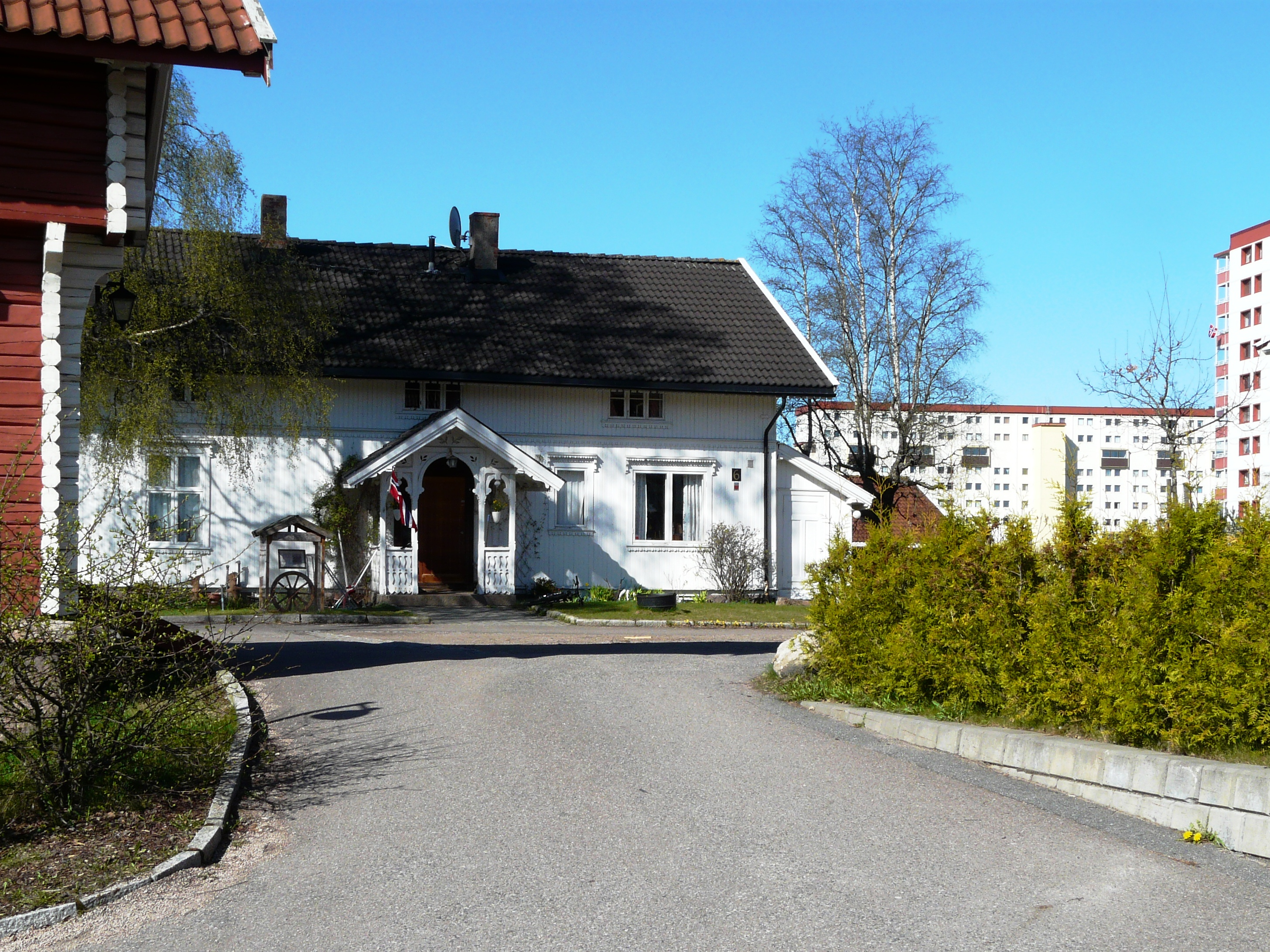
Farmhouse between tall buildings at Rødtvet, Oslo

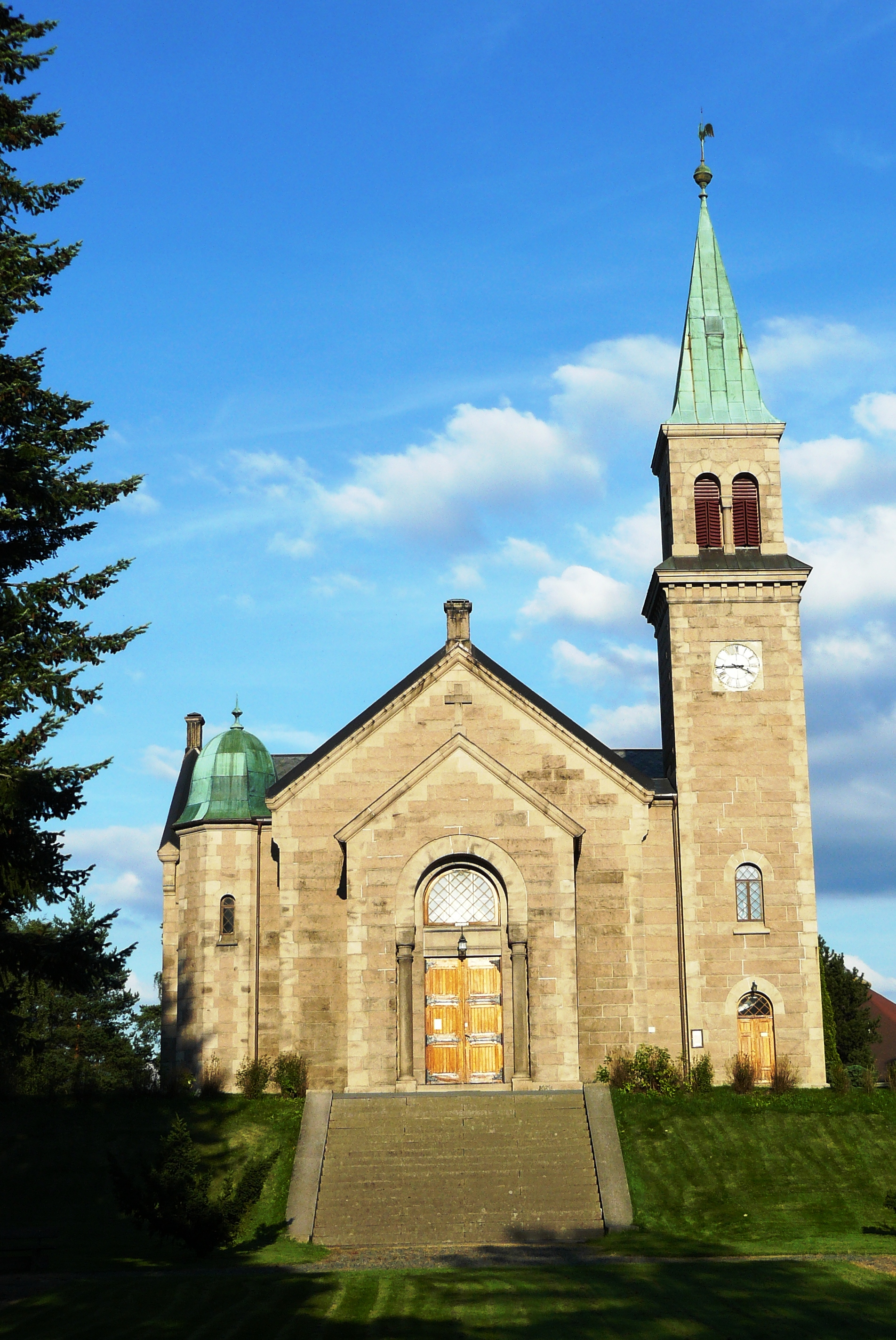
Grorud Church

Grorud is a borough of the city of Oslo, Norway. The borough contains the Ammerud, Grorud, Kalbakken, Rødtvet, Nordtvet and Romsås areas. To the north of the borough is the forest of Lillomarka. The borough is the smallest in Oslo, with fewer than 30 000 inhabitants.

The area now known as Grorud was mostly farm land until after World War II, an exception being Grorud proper, where mining was an important livelihood. Granite from Grorud is seen in many buildings in downtown Oslo - with the lion sculptures in front of Stortinget, the Norwegian Parliament being the most famous example. Textile industries were also a part of the urbanization of Grorud, with the river Alna and its waterfalls as power supply.

The railway station at Grorud, from 1854, is one of the oldest in Norway and was a hub of the whole Grorud Valley for many years until the arrival of urbanization and the subway. Some of the old farms are still present in the Grorud landscape, although apartment buildings now are a more dominant part of the scenery.

Traditionally a borough inhabited by the working class, Grorud has in the last few decades had a great influx of immigrants. The proportion of newborns with immigrant background was per. 2017 at 70%. Because of these statistics Grorud is a recurring theme in Norwegian immigration politics.

== Politics ==
As a borough of Oslo, Grorud is governed by the city council of Oslo as well as its own borough council. The council leader is Anders Røberg-Larsen from the Labour Party and the deputy leader is Alejandro Decap, of the Socialist Left Party. The Green Party has the most seats. The 15 seats are distributed among the following political parties for the 2019-2023 term:

- 7 from the Labour Party (Arbeiderpartiet)
- 2 from the Progress Party (Fremskrittspartiet)
- 2 from the Conservative Party (Høyre)
- 2 from the Red Party (Rødt)
- 1 from the Socialist Left Party (Sosialistisk Venstreparti)
- 1 from the Green Party (Miljøpartiet de Grønne)

== Notable people ==
- Trygve Lie, First Secretary-General of the United Nations
- Willy Bakken († 2010) popular culture writer
- Jan Bøhler (b. 1952), politician, member of parliament
- Flamur Kastrati (b. 1991), Norwegian footballer, from Rødtvet

== Gallery ==
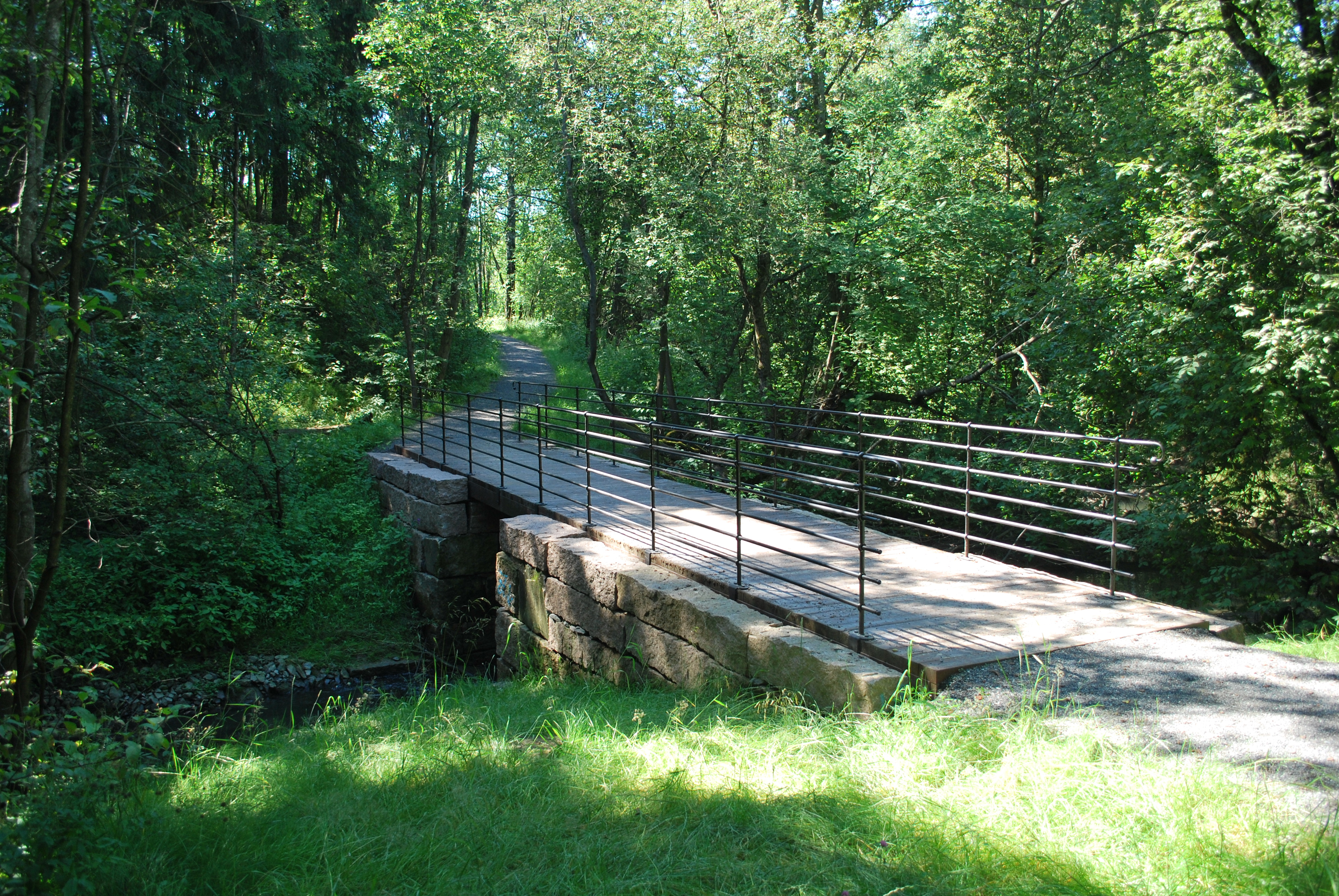
Alnaparken, bridge over river Alna, 2008.

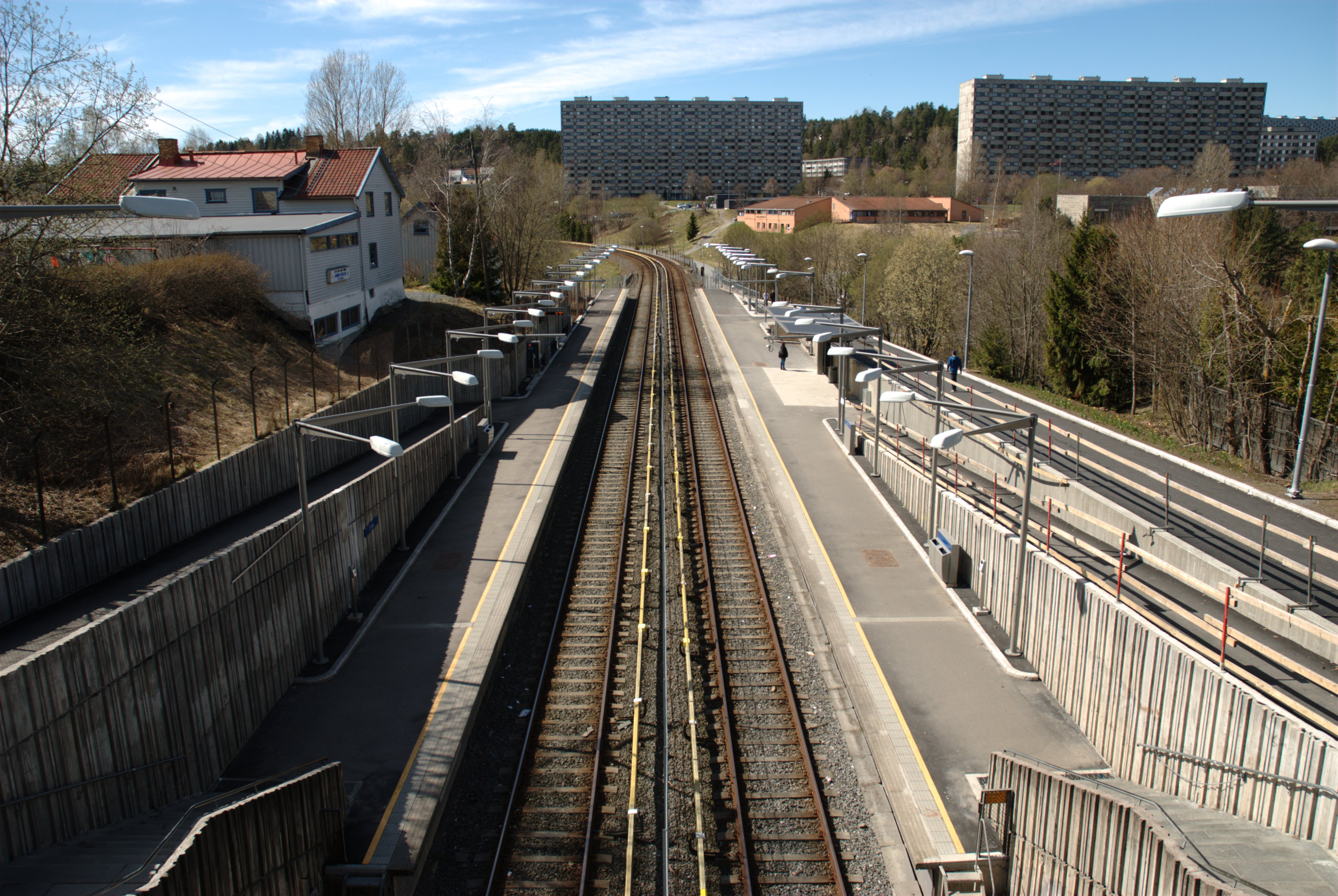
Grorud metro station, 2010.

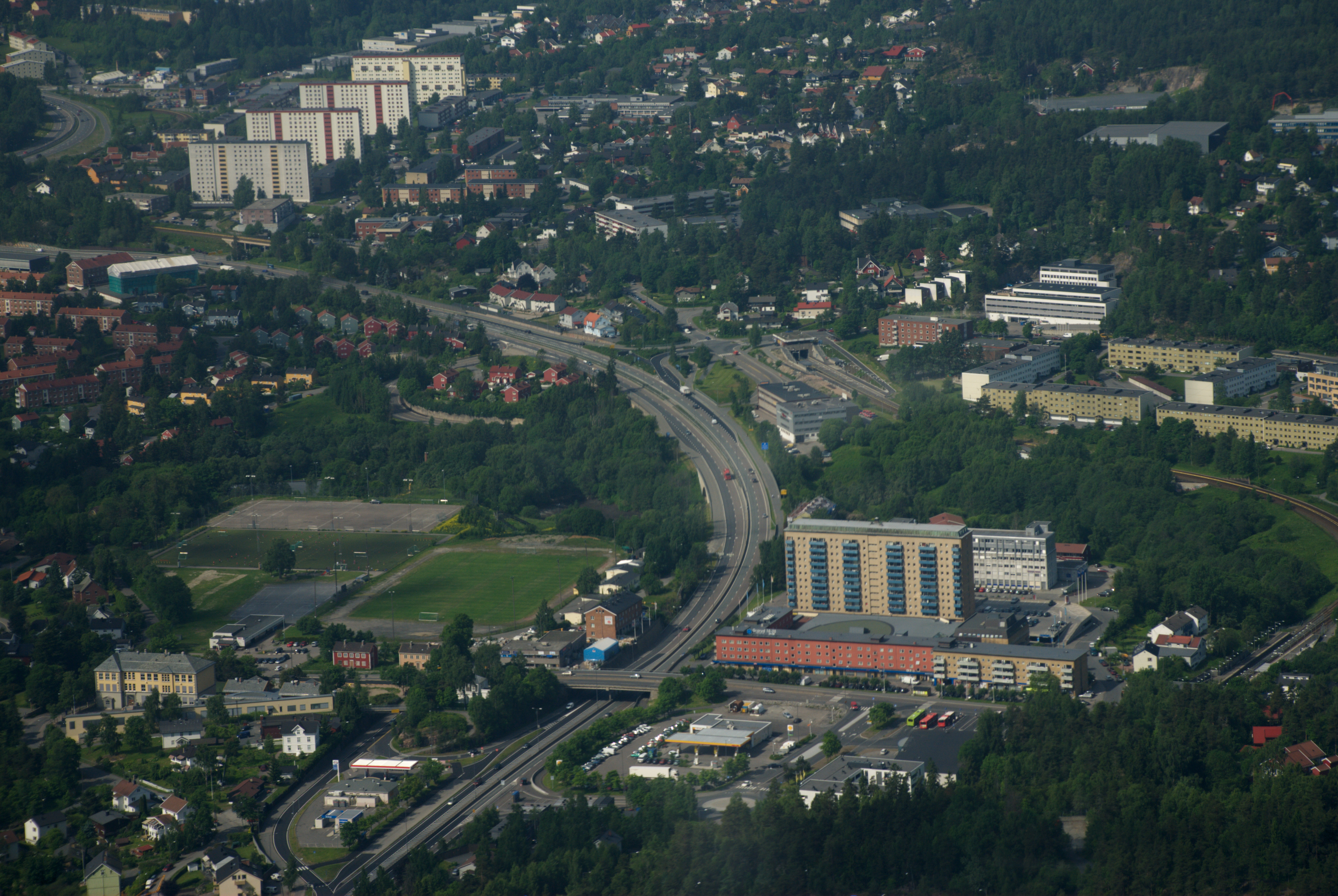
Grorud senter aerial, 2010.

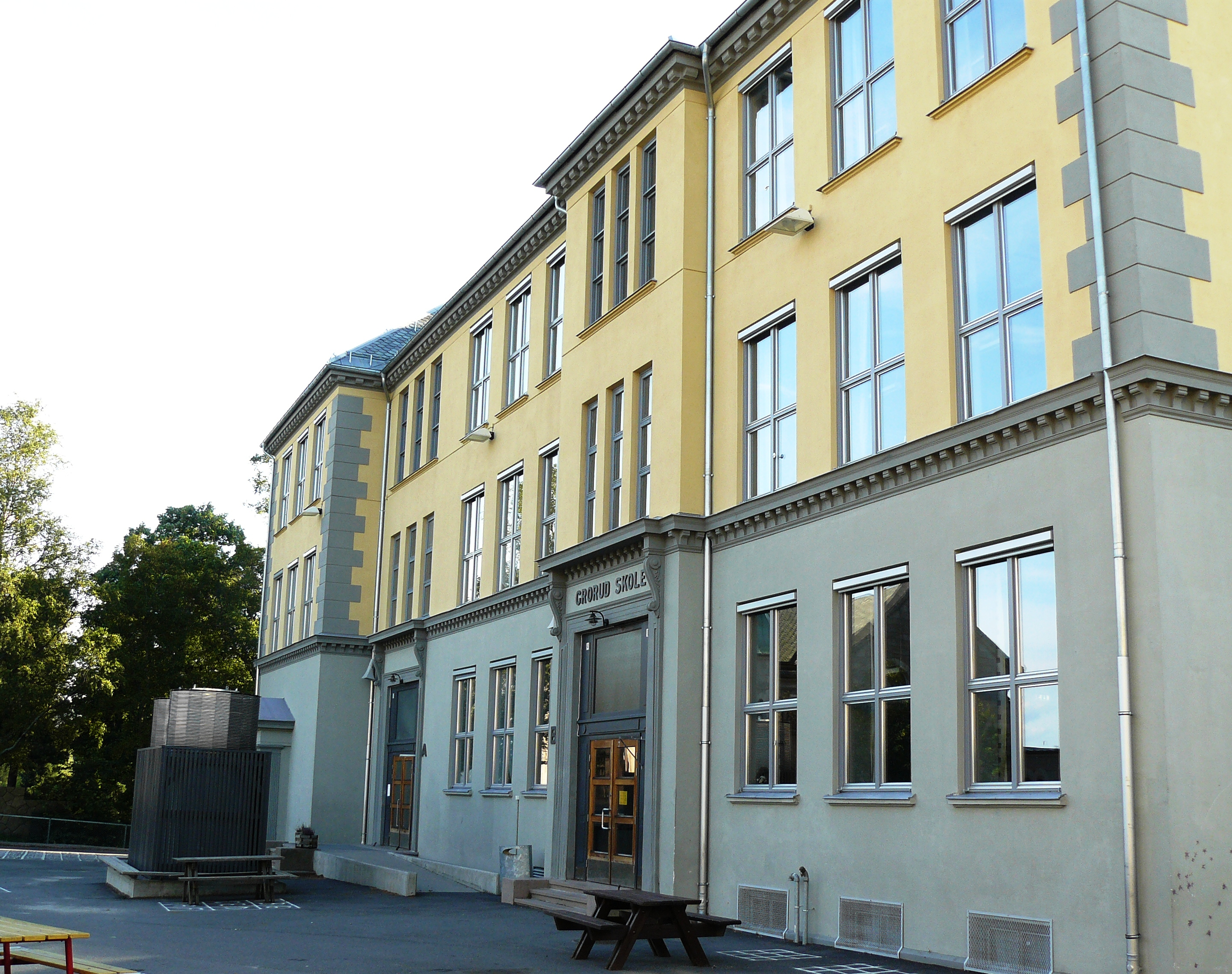
Grorud school, 2007.

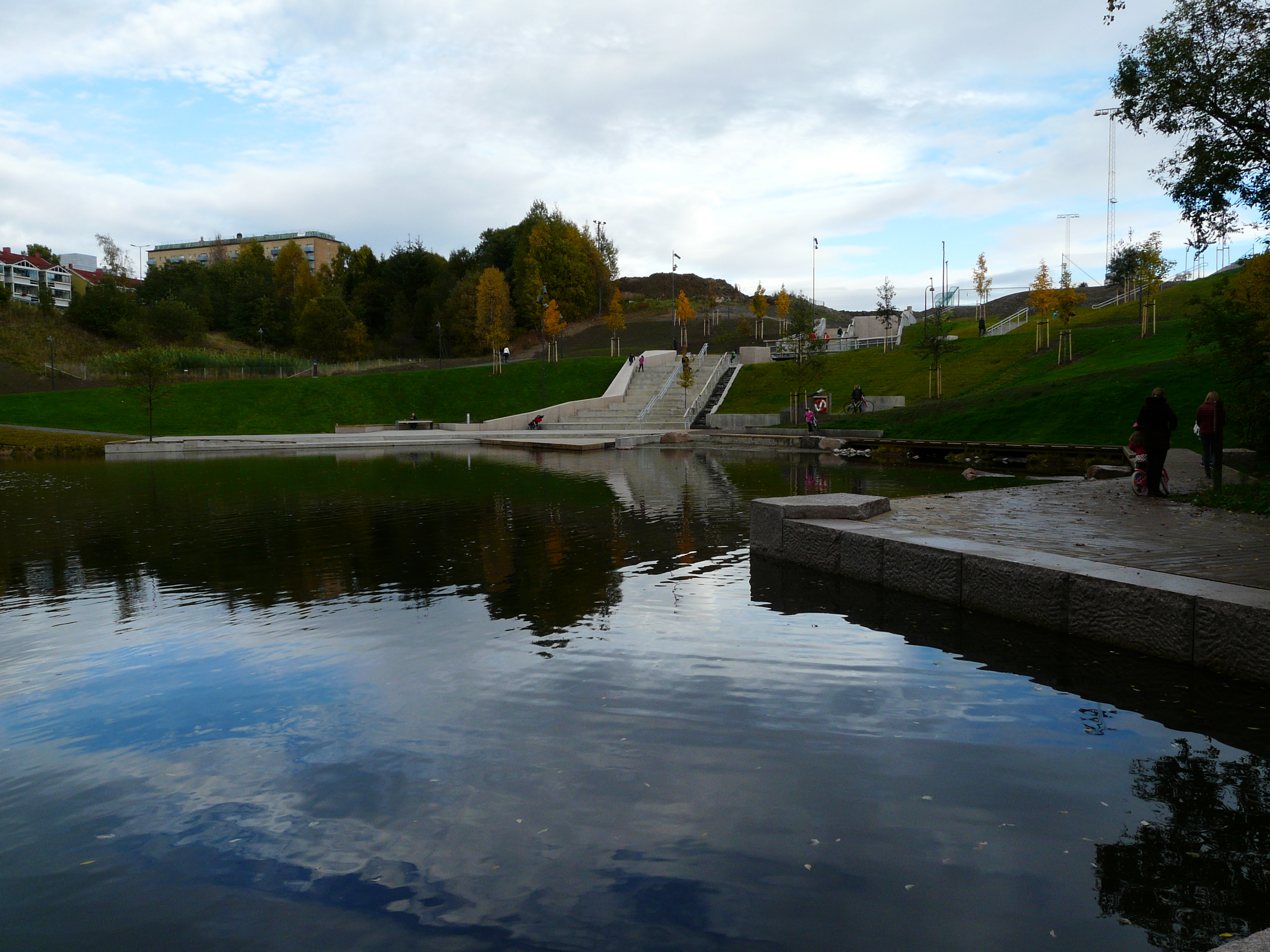
Groruddammen, Alna river, 2013.
