= Kalbakken =

Neighborhood in Oslo, Norway

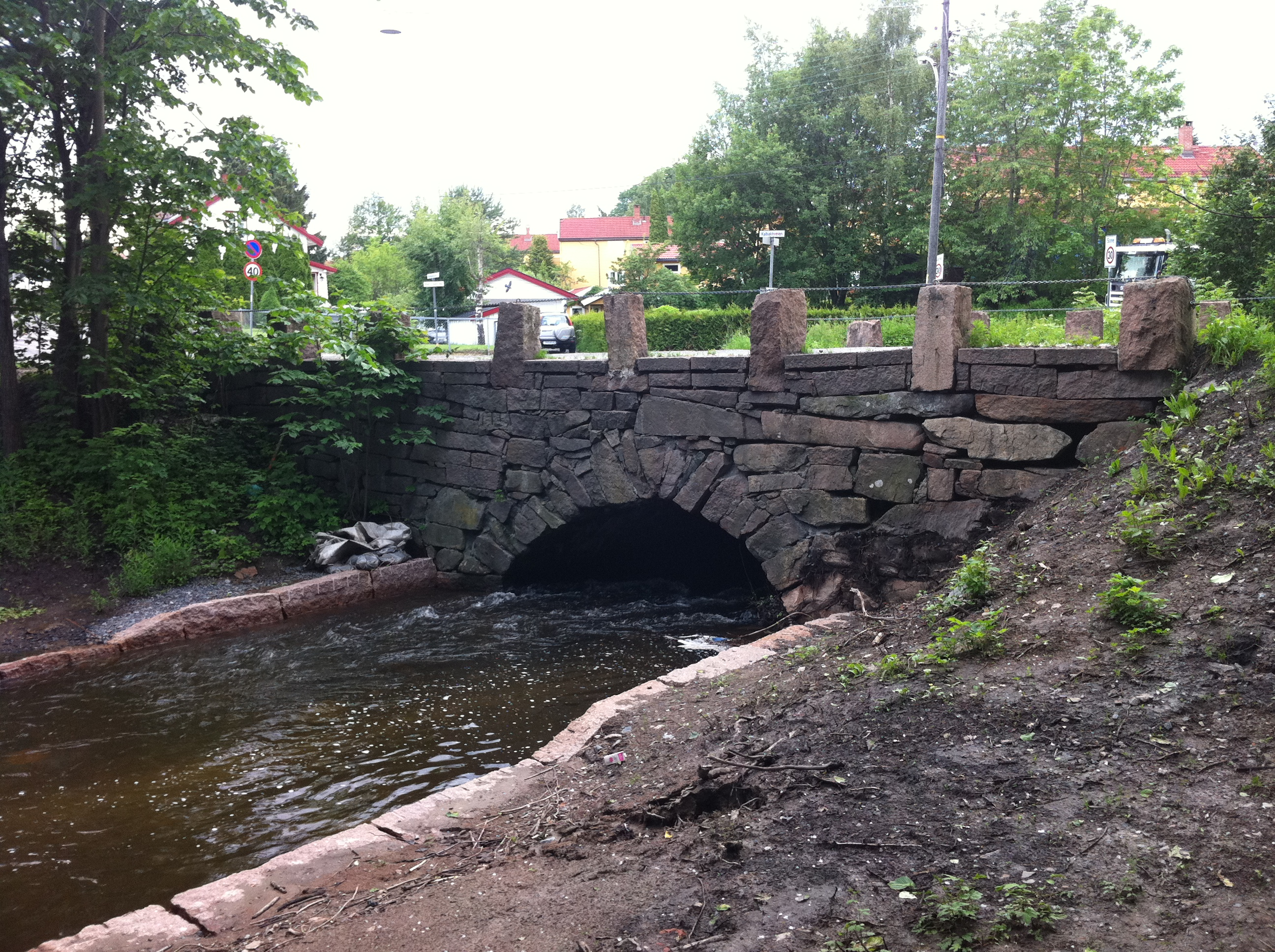
One of the oldest arch bridges of Norway in Kalbakken, Oslo

Kalbakken is a neighborhood in Grorud borough, Oslo, Norway.

Kalbakken station on the Oslo Metro also serves the adjacent districts Nordtvet and Flaen between Trondheimsveien and Østre Aker vei, which are Groruddalens main thoroughfares into the city center.

Flaen and Kalbakken were developed as satellite towns of Oslo in the 1950s.

Economy: Kalbakken has a farm.
