= Jesus Church, Oslo =

The Jesus Church is a Charismatic Evangelical church congregation in Oslo.

== History ==
The Jesus Church was started on September 3, 2000 by pastors Stephan Christiansen and Anne Christiansen along with a group of young Norwegians eager to share the life of Jesus Christ. By 2001 the church was also established in Marseille, France, but this branch has later been shut down.

== See also ==
- Pentecostalism in Norway
