= Ammerud =

- Neighbourhood
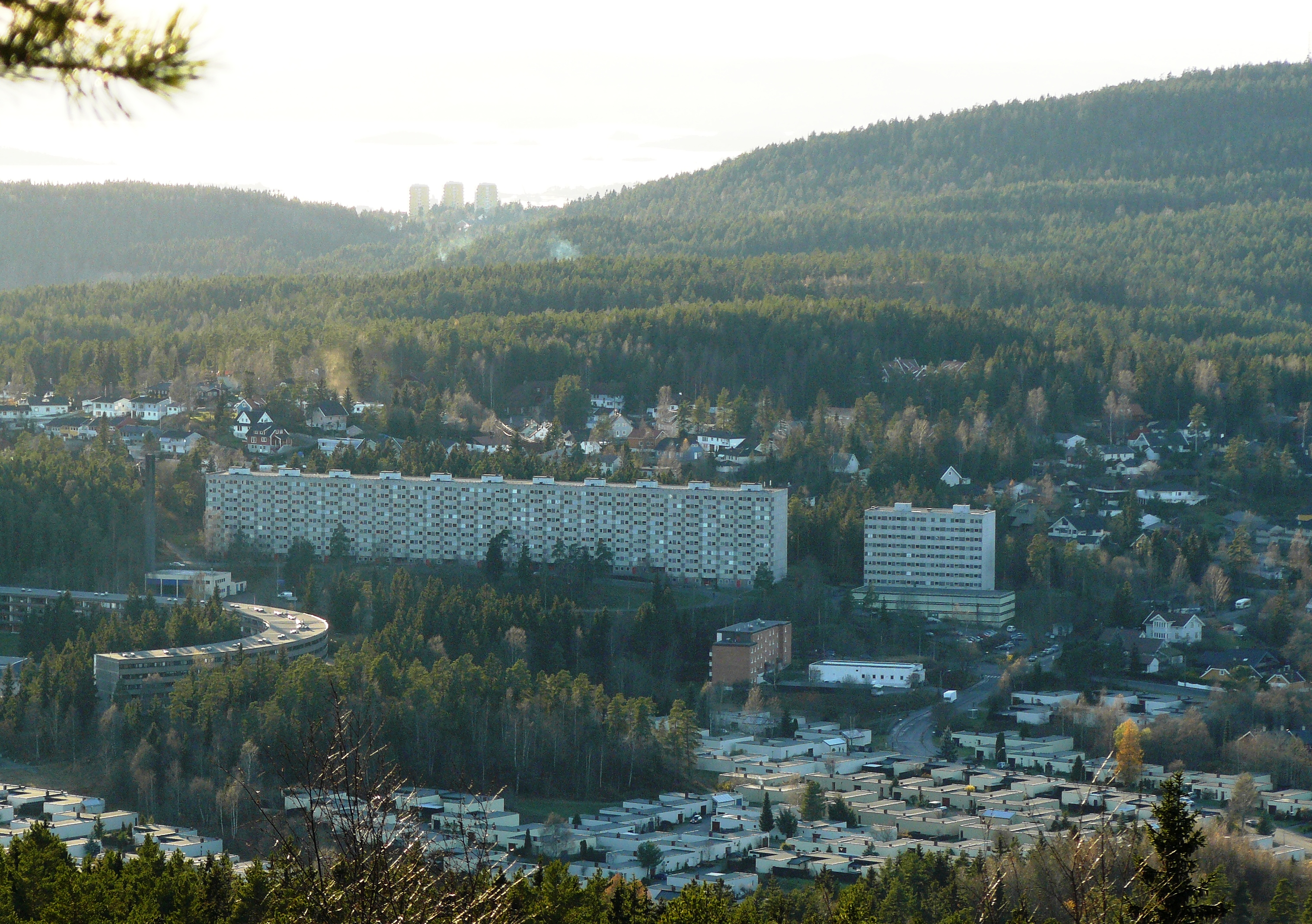
- Ammerud as seen from Romsås, with atrium housing, apartment blocks, and villas lining forested Lillomarka. Photo: C. Hill, 2007
- Interactive map of Ammerud
- Coordinates: 59°57′49″N 10°52′16″E
- Country: Norway
- County: Oslo
- District: Groruddalen
- Municipality: Oslo
- Borough: Grorud
- Time zone: UTC+1 (CET)
  - Summer (DST): UTC+2 (CEST)
- Postal codes: 0904 + 0957-0960

Location in Oslo

Ammerud is a part of Grorud Borough in Oslo, Norway known for its large Le Corbusier style housing blocks. The borough administration is located here.

Before 1966 farms dominated this area. Then urban development, part of the trend of suburbanization in Oslo which had started shortly after the end of World War II, saw that the construction of large apartment buildings, chained housing and atrium houses. Most of the building was done by Oslo Bolig- og Sparelag (OBOS). Ammerud spans some of Norway's largest apartment blocks as well as a quiet, residential neighbourhood close to forested Lillomarka consisting of single-family detached homes

The population of Ammerud today is a highly mixed conglomerate of different nationalities and ethnicities.

To the north of the residential areas, bordering on the forest, lies Huken Quarry which also produces asphalt concrete. This is also the venue for the annual open air rock festival GranittRock.

The proximity to Lillomarka makes Ammerud a convenient departure point for trips in Marka, in particular to the tourist facility Lilloseter. Breisjøen and Alnsjøen in Lillomarka bordering Ammerud supply drinking water for parts of Oslo.

== The name ==
The neighborhood is named after the old farm Ammerud (Norse Ambaruð). The first element is the genitive case of the old male name Ambi, the last element is ruð n 'clearing, new farm' (probably from the period 1000-1350 AD).

== People from Ammerud ==
- Torgeir Bryn
- Ezinne Okparaebo
- Christer George
- Rocky Lekaj
- Dagfinn Enerly
- Flamur Kastrati
- Fitim Kastrati
- Arianne Duarte Morais

== Transportation ==
Ammerud is served by Oslo T-bane's Ammerud station with 8 departures every hour. The ride to downtown Oslo takes 20 minutes. Several bus lines that run along Trondheimsveien also serve the neighbourhood.

A local bus line, 62, runs through Ammerudveien, from the metro station, to Huken and from there to Grorud Center.

== Schools ==
- Ammerud skole is a recently rehabilitated primary school with more than 500 pupils from 54 nations. The number of pupils is increasing.
- Apalløkka skole is a lower secondary school with 350+ pupils.

== Gallery ==
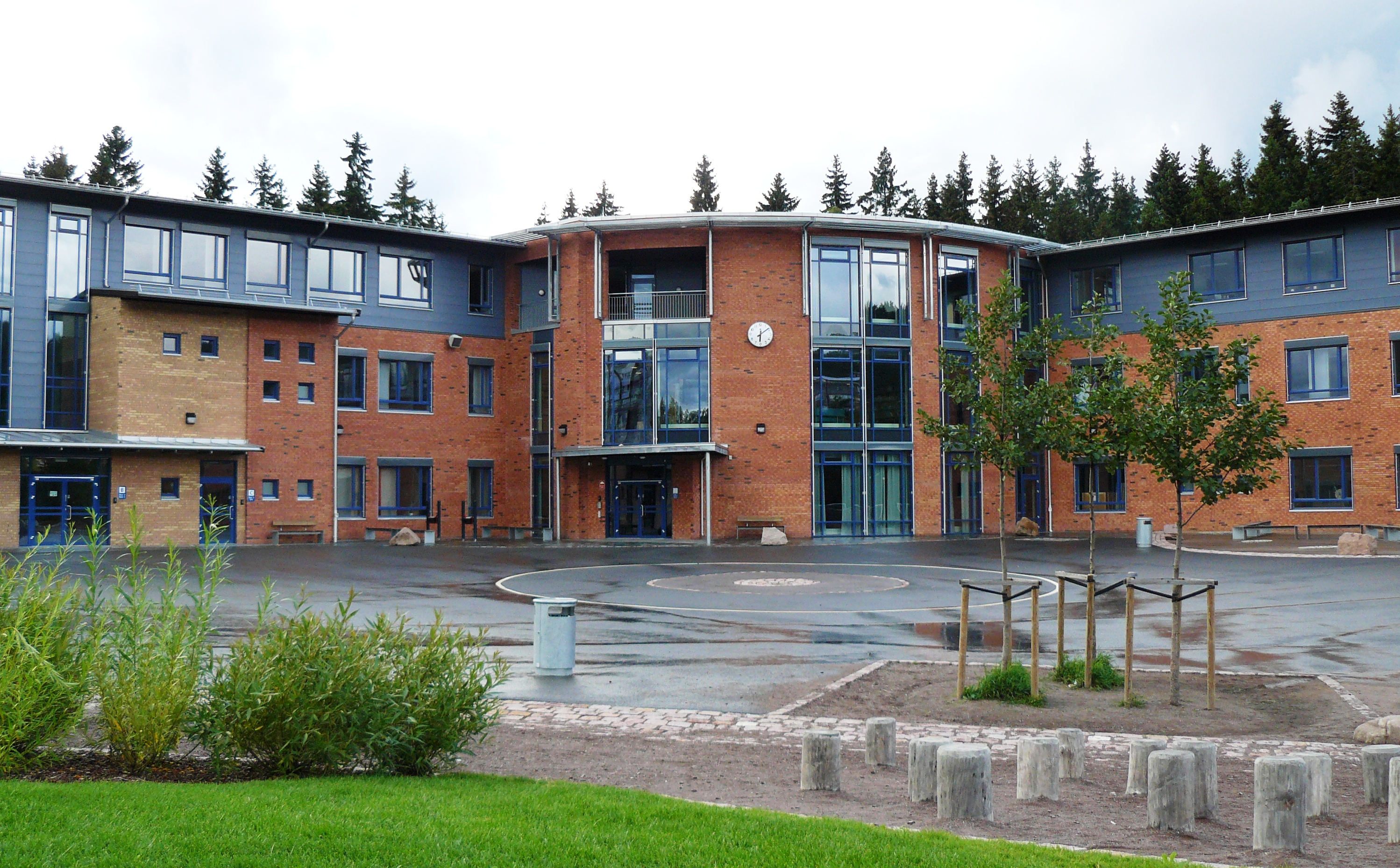
Ammerud skole

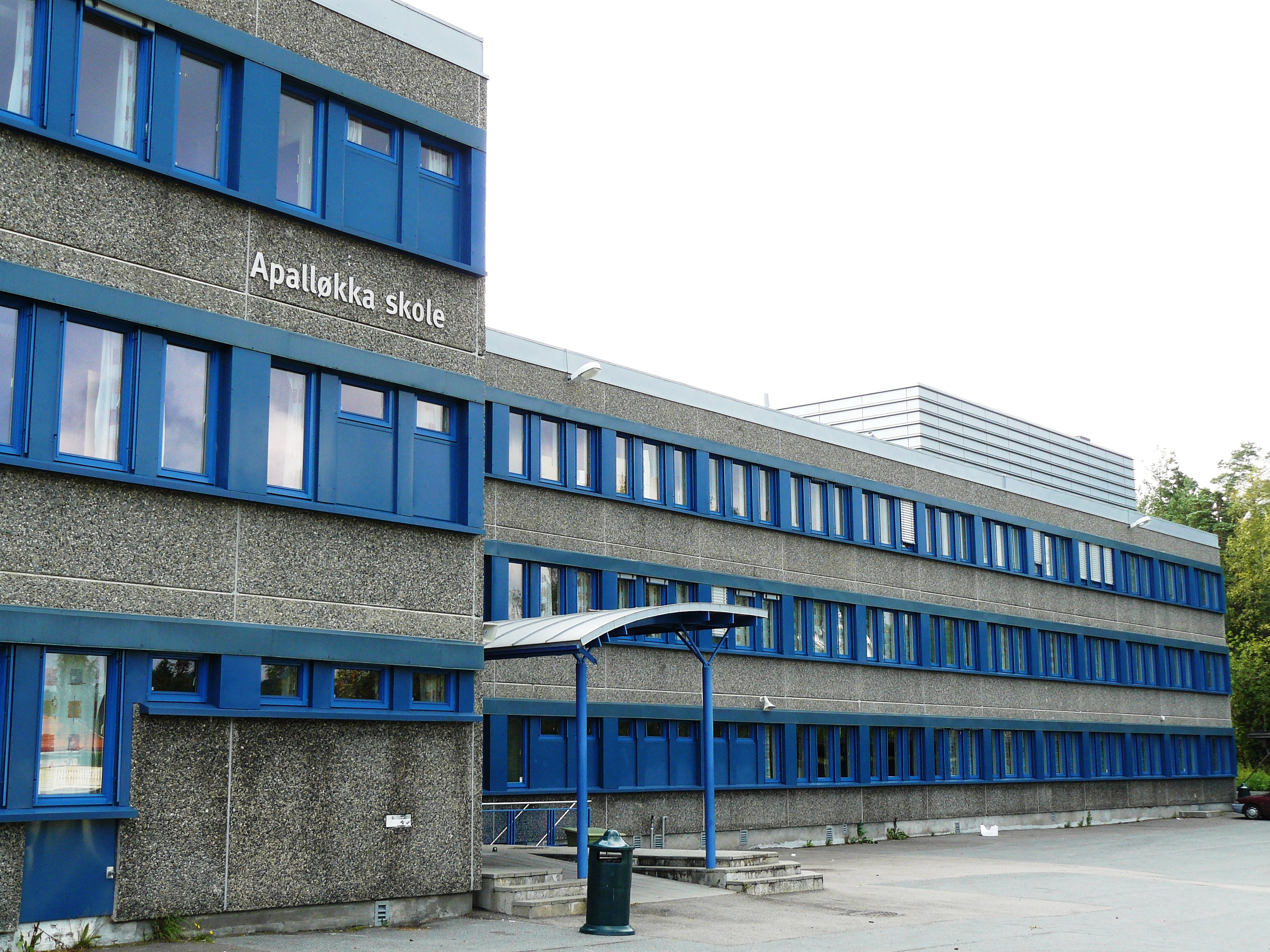
Apalløkka skole

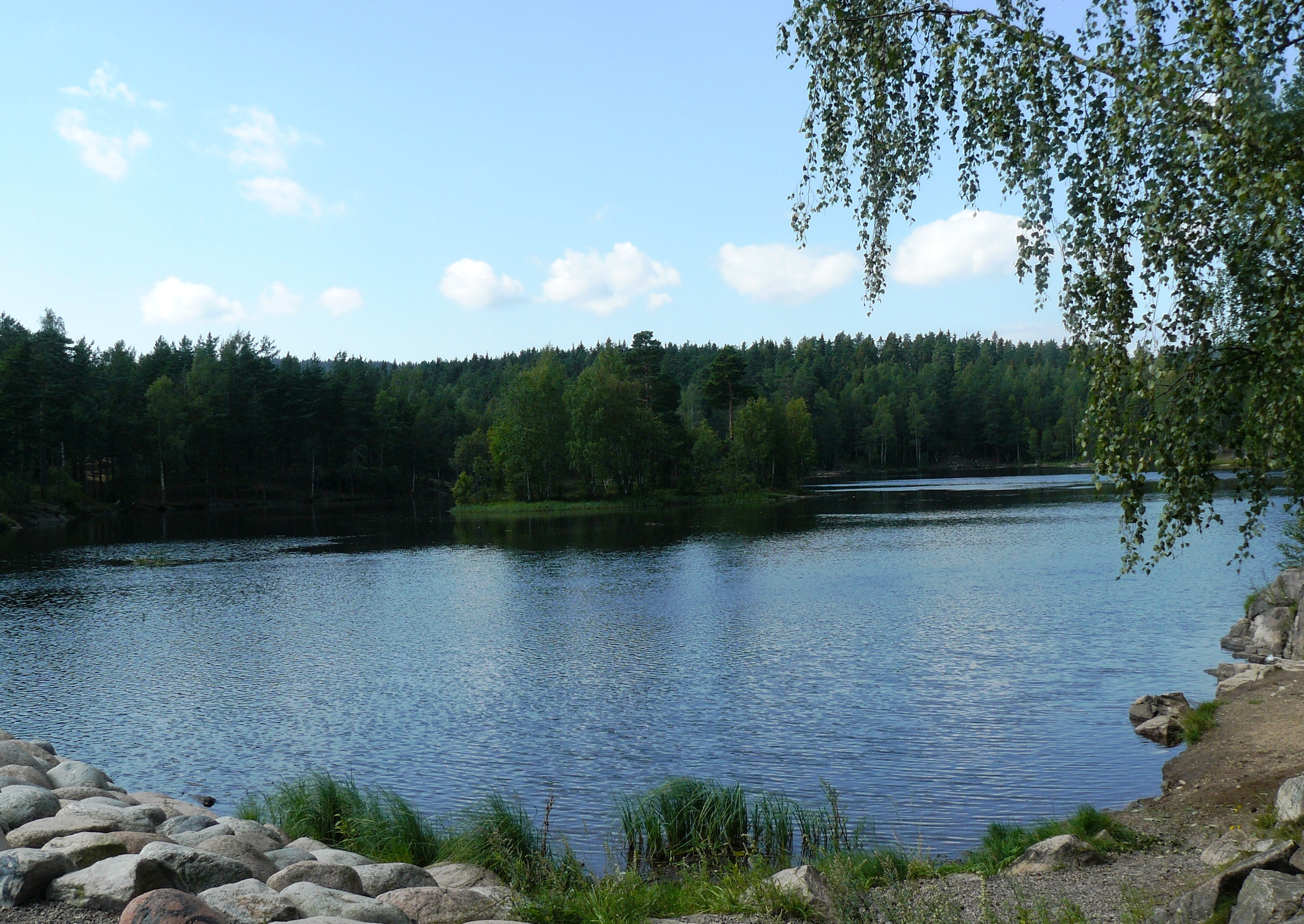
Vesletjern
