= Grorud Valley =

Area of Oslo, Norway

Coordinates: 59°57′N 10°54′E

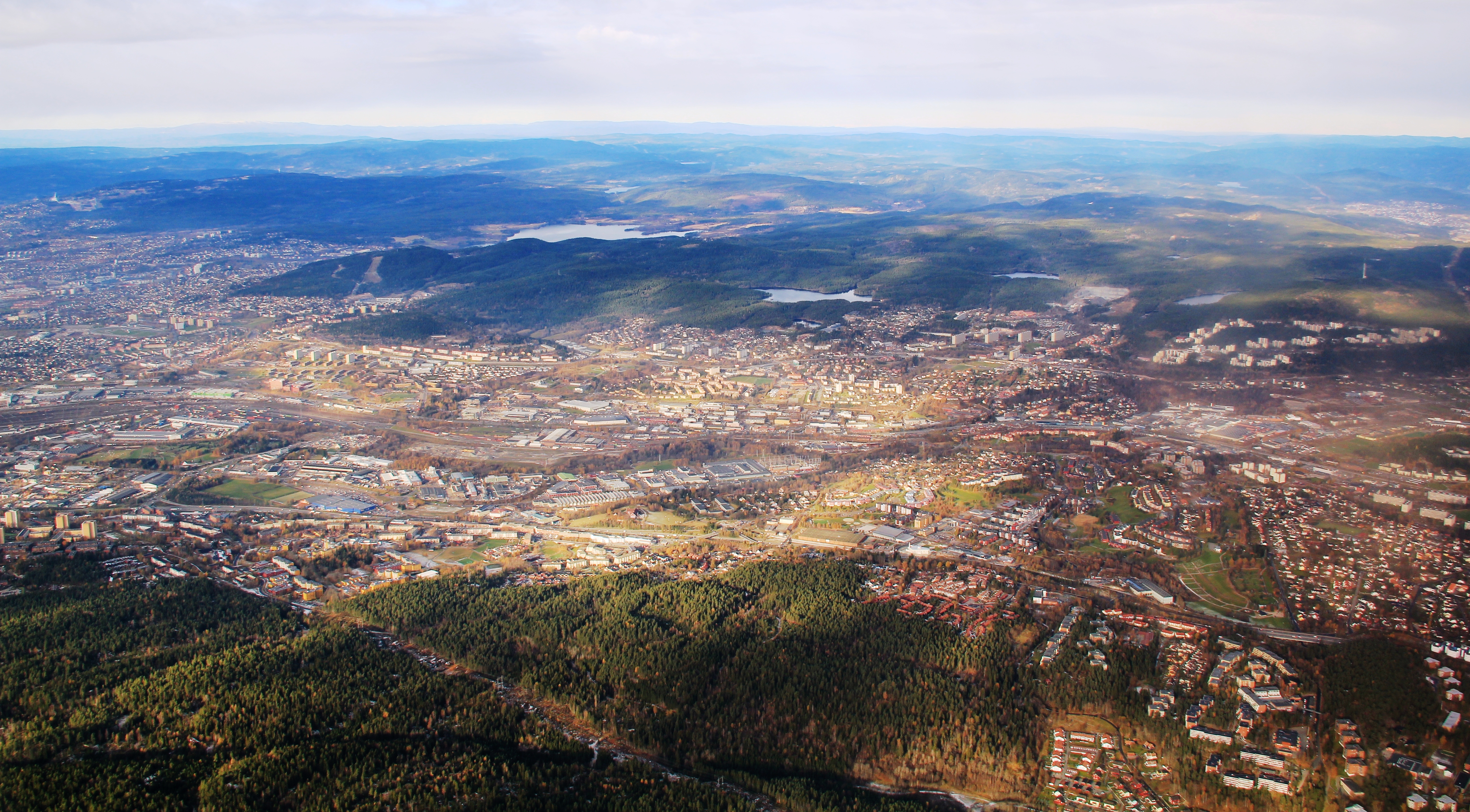
Aerial view of the Grorud Valley

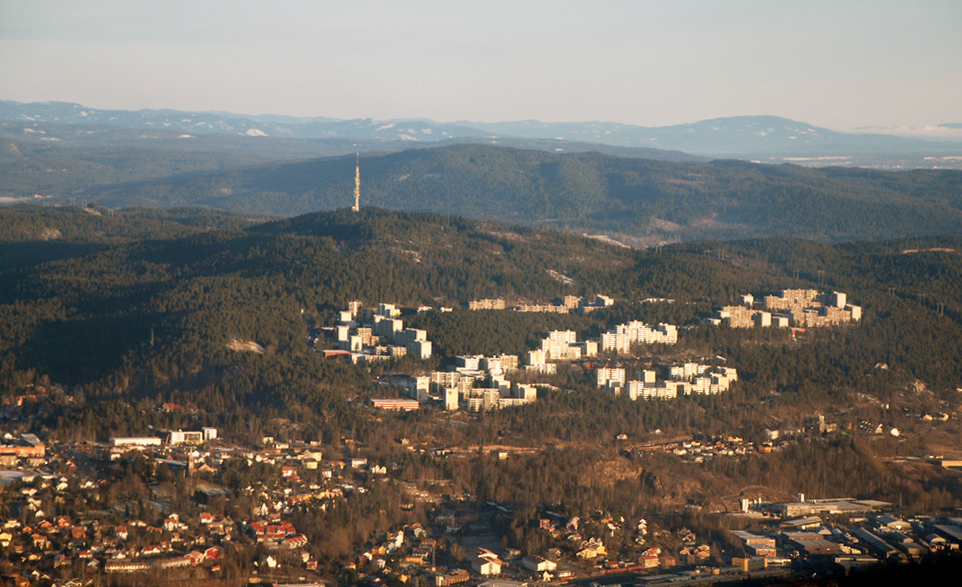
The Grorud Valley with Romsås in the background

The Grorud Valley (Norwegian: Groruddalen) is a valley and urban area or suburb in the northeastern part of Oslo, the capital of Norway. Four of Oslo's boroughs lie within the Grorud Valley; Bjerke to the west, Alna to the south, Grorud to the north, and Stovner to the east. The name Groruddalen has been in use at least since the mid-19th century. The current use of the name Groruddalen was coined in 1960 to describe the area covered by the local newspaper Akers Avis Groruddalen, until then named Akers avis. Before 1960, this area was known as Akersdalen, whilst the name Groruddalen was user for the river valley from lake Alnsjøen along Alna River to Bryn.

The population of the Grorud Valley is around 140,000 (approximately a fifth of the population of Oslo). The main population centers are on the valley sides, close to the forest of Lillomarka and Østmarka. The valley basin has fewer houses but a fair amount of industry. Thanks to large scale urbanization throughout the valley in the 1960s and 1970s, it was transformed from agricultural to suburban landscape. Generally the neighborhoods are well maintained and there are recreational facilities and open spaces in the Grorud Valley.

The Grorud Valley is served by several motorways and rail lines running along the valley. In the south of the valley is the European route E6 highway and the subway line Furusetbanen. The central valley is served by Norwegian Route 163 (Østre Aker vei) as well as Hovedbanen rail line. The north side is served by Norwegian Route 4 (Trondheimsveien) and the subway line Grorudbanen.

== People from Groruddalen ==
- Jan Bøhler, politician, member of parliament
- Flamur Kastrati, Kosovar football player, grew up at Rødtvet

== Other sources ==
- Eivind Heide (1980) Groruddalen (Oslo: Tiden Norsk Forlag) ISBN 9788210019074
