= Rocky Lekaj =

Footballer (born 1989)

Personal information
- Full name: Rocky Rexhep Lekaj
- Date of birth: 12 October 1989 (age 37)
- Place of birth: Peć, Yugoslavia
- Height: 5 ft 9 in (1.75 m)
- Positions: Midfielder; left winger

Team information
- Current team: Skreia
- Number: 7

Youth career
- –2006: Grei
- 2006–2007: Sheffield Wednesday

Senior career*
| Years | Team | Apps | (Gls) |
| 2007–2010 | Sheffield Wednesday | 4 | (0) |
| 2009 | → Sandefjord (loan) | 3 | (0) |
| 2010 | Lyn | 7 | (1) |
| 2010–2011 | Romsås | 3 | (0) |
| 2011–2013 | Grorud | 38 | (15) |
| 2013–2016 | Raufoss | 79 | (69) |
| 2016–2017 | Kristiansund | 12 | (2) |
| 2017–2018 | Fredrikstad | 34 | (6) |
| 2019–2024 | Gjøvik-Lyn | 87 | (65) |
| 2024– | Skreia | 74 | (98) |

International career
| 2007 | Norway U18 | 5 | (0) |
| 2007 | Norway U19 | 3 | (0) |
- * Club domestic league appearances and goals as of 24 October 2026

Rocky Rexhep Lekaj (born 12 October 1989) is a professional footballer who plays as a midfielder or left winger for Skreia. Born in Kosovo, he has represented Norway at an international youth level and formerly played for Sheffield Wednesday.

== Career ==
Lekaj hails from Ammerud in Oslo, and was inspired by footballer Dagfinn Enerly, who was his school teacher in the early years. He started his career in SF Grei. He was signed by Sheffield Wednesday in the summer of 2006. He first appeared for the first team on 13 March 2007 at Hillsborough, entering the game as an 86th-minute substitute for striker Steve MacLean in a 2–0 league victory against Colchester United. Lekaj became the youngest Norwegian player who has ever played in the professional English league system. He played one more game in the 2006–07 season.

Lekaj did not play first-team football in the 2007–08 season, but made his first appearance of the 2008–09 season against Rotherham United in the League Cup. He came on as a substitute for Jimmy Smith and showed signs of promise, despite not playing in his favoured left wing position. He also played two games in the Football League Championship and one game in the FA Cup. Following the close of the 2008–09 season, Lekaj was reported to be a transfer target for Grimsby Town, this was quashed by Mariners manager Mike Newell, mentioning that Lekaj's agent had approached Newell while he was scouting at a Wednesday Reserves game. Newell commented that Lekaj was not the sort of player he was looking for. In 2009, Lekaj scored fourteen goals in ten appearances for the reserve team and was recommended by the manager a loan move. Lekaj ended up in Sandefjord, but an ankle injury kept him out of the football. When he returned to Sheffield Wednesday, manager Brian Laws was replaced. Lekaj then left Wednesday after his contract was cancelled in March 2010, having made six appearances for the Owls.

He ended up in Lyn and played for them until the club went bankrupt in the summer of 2010. He then signed for the Norwegian Fourth Division team Romsås to help them win promotion. In 2011, he played for Grorud IL in their promotion campaign to the Second Division.

Rocky left Fredrikstad FK at the end of the 2018 season. He moved back to Raufoss with his wife and children and signed for Gjøvik-Lyn.

== Personal life ==
Rocky also has a younger brother, Leon Lekaj, who also played for the Owls under-17s.
