= Alna (disambiguation) =

Alna is a borough of Oslo, Norway.

Alna may also refer to:

== Places ==
- Alna, Maine, a town in the US
- Alna (river), a river in Oslo, Norway
- Łyna (river) (Alna in Lithuanian), a river in Poland and the Kaliningrad Oblast of Russia

== Other ==
- Alna's, a motto used by musician Alberto Naranjo
- ALNA Sharyo, a Japanese rolling stock and tram manufacturer
