= Mike Kjølø =

Norwegian footballer (born 1971)

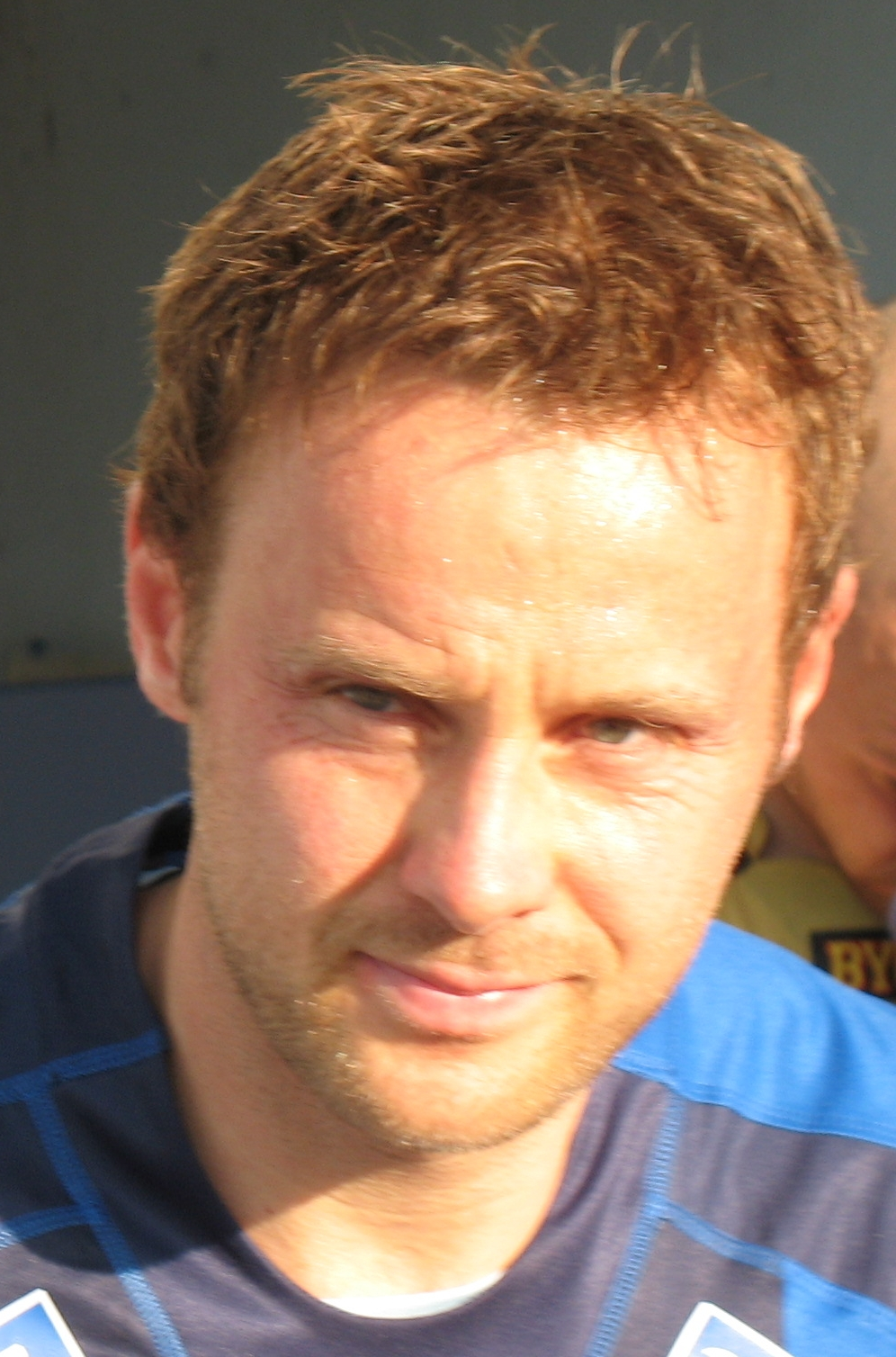
- Mike Kjølø, was a Norwegian footballer who played as a defender.

Personal information
- Full name: Mike Christoffer Johannessen Kjølø
- Date of birth: 27 October 1971 (age 55)
- Place of birth: Oslo, Norway
- Height: 1.80 m (5 ft 11 in)
- Position: Defender

Youth career
- –1987: Romsås

Senior career*
Years	Team	Apps	(Gls)
1988–1990	Strømmen		
1991–1997	Skeid		
1998–1999	AIK	49	(2)
2000–2008	Stabæk	199	(7)

International career
2000	Norway	1	(0)
- * Club domestic league appearances and goals

Mike Kjølø (born 27 October 1971) is a Norwegian former football defender.

He won the 1995 1. divisjon with Skeid, and after impressing in the Eliteserien for two seasons, where he played every game, he won a transfer to AIK. Here he won the 1998 Allsvenskan and the 1999 Cup. He was capped once for Norway. Subsequently, bought by Stabæk, Kjølø crowned a long career by winning the 2008 Tippeligaen.

After retiring he became a football agent, and among others arranged the transfer to Jong PSV for his own son Mathias Kjølø.
