= Romsås IL =

Norwegian sports club

- Full name: Romsås Idrettslag
- Founded: 1972
- Ground: Grorud Kunstgress
- Chairman: Kjell Kristiansen
- Coach: Nikola Bes
- League: Third Division
- 2011: Third Division/ 3 9th
Home colours	Away colours

Romsås Idrettslag is a sports club from Grorud, Oslo, Norway.

It was founded in 1972, and the club has sections for football, handball, floorball, orienteering, aerobic and artistic gymnastics

The football club currently plays in the Norwegian Third Division, where they have been playing since 2011. The name of the club's stadium is Bjøråsen. Notable former footballers include Jan Derek Sørensen, Mike Kjølø, Rocky Lekaj and Joshua King.
