= Dagfinn Enerly =

Norwegian football player (born 1972)

Personal information
- Full name: Arne Dagfinn Enerly
- Date of birth: 9 December 1972 (age 53)
- Place of birth: Oslo, Norway
- Position: Winger

Youth career
- 1990–1994: Grorud

Senior career*
Years	Team	Apps	(Gls)
1995–1998	Skeid	62	(25)
1998–2000	Moss	48	(20)
2001–2004	Rosenborg	46	(6)
2004–2005	Fredrikstad	34	(7)
Total		190	(58)

International career
1996–2001	Norway	2	(0)
- * Club domestic league appearances and goals

Dagfinn Enerly (born 9 December 1972) is a Norwegian former footballer who played as a winger for Norwegian Premier League clubs Skeid, Moss, Rosenborg and Fredrikstad. In 2005, he broke his neck during a match, which left him paralyzed from the chest down. He has since regained partial movement in his arms and legs, and has several times stated his intentions to walk again.

== Club career ==
Enerly grew up in Ammerud on Oslo's east side, and started his career for local clubs Grorud and later Grei. He then went to the Oslo-club Skeid and with them got his debut in the Norwegian Premier League in 1996. Enerly usually played on the right wing. His key attributes as a player were good pace, good technique and an excellent long-range shot. When Skeid were relegated in 1997, he went to Moss, where he played for three seasons before being signed by champions Rosenborg. Enerly spent three and a half seasons in Rosenborg, winning the League three times. After getting limited playing time in his final season at Rosenborg, he joined Fredrikstad halfway through the 2004 season, where his experience quickly made him an important player and he became team captain.

=== Neck injury and retirement ===
On 29 October 2005, in the last round of the 2005 season, Fredrikstad faced league leaders Start, away in Kristiansand struggling to avoid relegation. Fredrikstad won the match 3–1, which meant that Fredrikstad stayed up. However, just five minutes into the game, Enerly collided with a teammate, and fell to the ground with his teammate falling on top of him. Enerly was unable to get up or even move a muscle, and medical personnel rushed to his aid carried him off on a stretcher, wearing a neck brace. Later that evening it was announced that Enerly, who had been sent to Oslo's Ullevål Hospital for surgery, had broken his neck and was quadriplegic.

The news of the injury shocked all of Norway and overshadowed all the football-related events around the country. In the days that followed, Enerly received well-wishings from every walk of life in Norway, and even from the stars of Real Madrid who were visiting Norway for a Champions League match against Rosenborg. In the days following the accident, a massive SMS campaign was created getting people to light a candle in their window at 8:00 in the evening (Enerly's shirt number was #8).

In January 2006 it was reported that Enerly had regained some movement in his arms, but that his legs are still paralysed, and in December 2006 it was reported that he has regained movement and strength in his left arm, and some in his right arm (able to lift up to 4 kg). As of December 2011, Enerly is still reliant on an electric wheelchair, but he confirmed to Norwegian newspapers that he had stood upright on his own feet for the first time since the accident during a training session in a therapeutic pool. He stood on his own feet in the pool, supporting his own weight, for fifteen seconds.

As Fredrikstad F.K. were celebrating their Norwegian Cup victory in 2006 at Ullevaal Stadion, Enerly was brought onto the pitch to celebrate with the players, as a gesture for his involvement in the club even after his injury. In August 2007, it was announced that FFK will retire his jersey No. 8.

On 8 September. Dagfinn Enerly and Tor Trondsen held a testimonial match for Knut Thorbjørn Eggen. Team Eggen vs Team RBK. Team Eggen was formed by Enerly, and the players were earlier football players from FFK and other players Eggen has trained. Team RBK was "old" boys from the early RBK. At team Eggen – Enerly was captain. He played in the way he could. That was a comeback. He scored a goal. He played it in his wheelchair to big applause from the audience.

== International career ==
Enerly made two appearances for the Norway national team, the first in a 1996 friendly against Georgia (as substitute for Jan Åge Fjørtoft), and the second in a 2001 friendly against South Korea. He was also a national team regular in football tennis.
