= Lillomarka =

Forest in Norway

Coordinates: 59.998°N 10.863°E

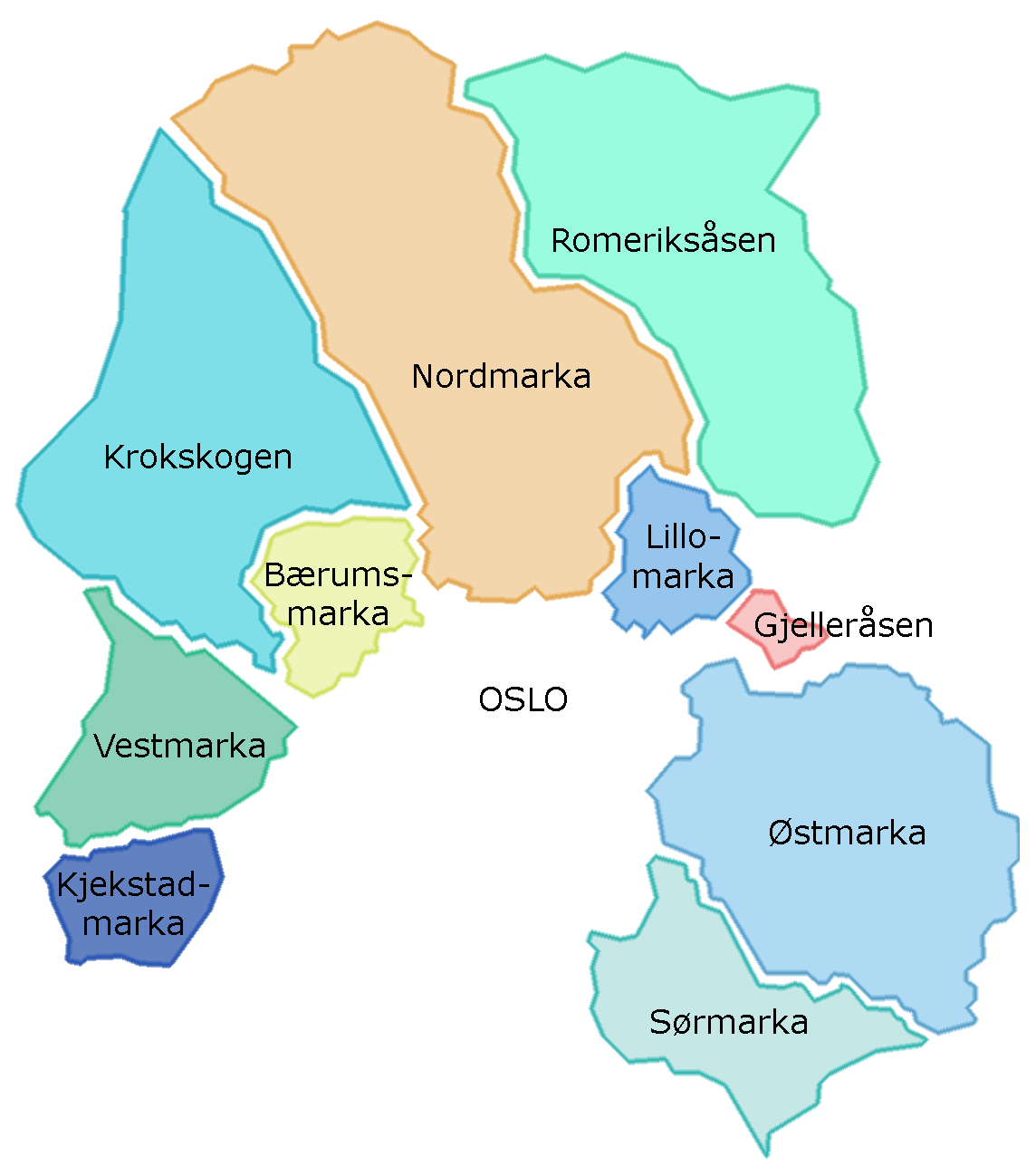
Map of Oslomarka

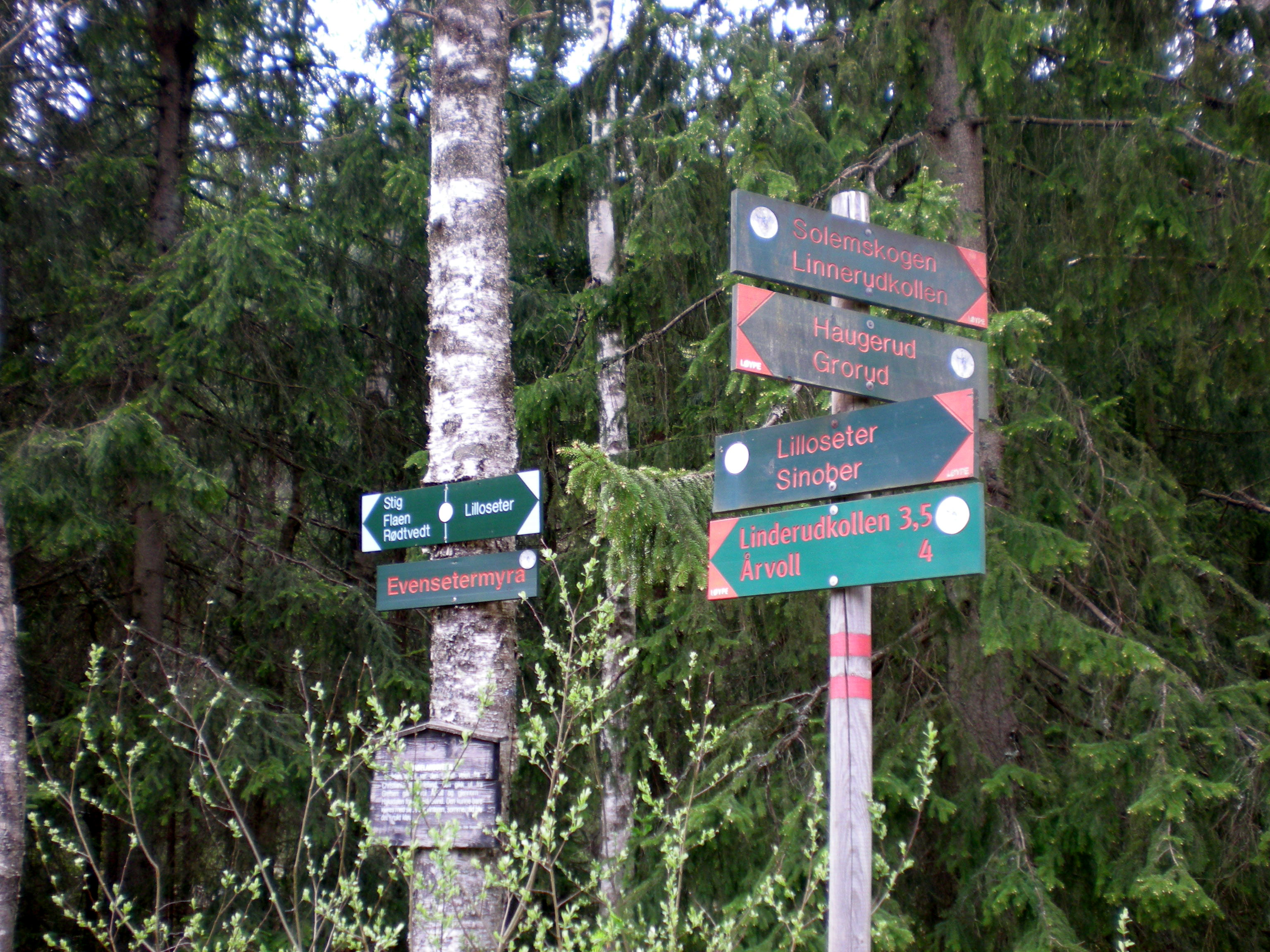
Hiking and cross-country ski trail signs at Evensetermyra

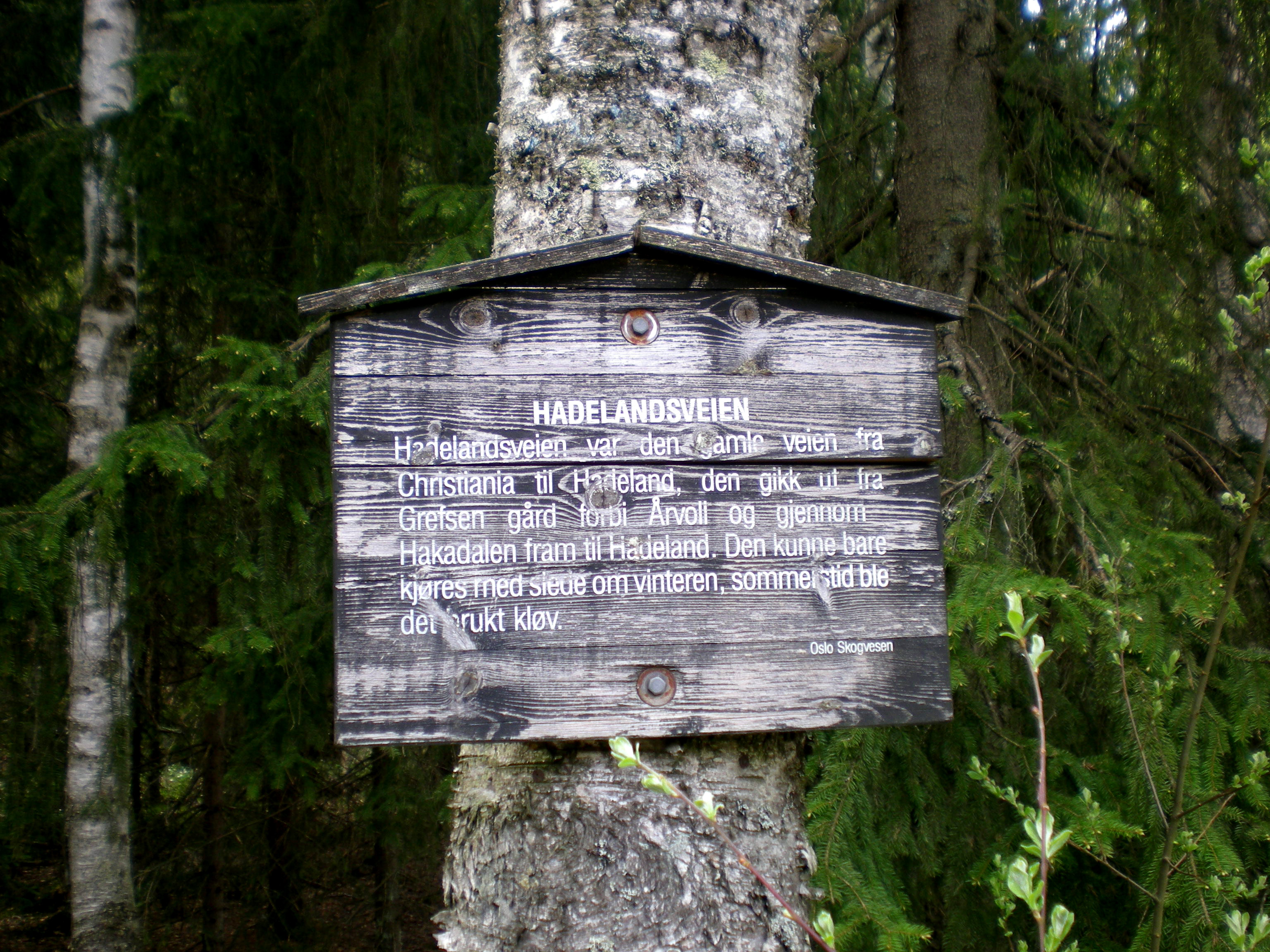
The old Hadeland road goes through Lillomarka

Lillomarka is an area located to the northeast of Oslo, Norway. It is a part of Oslomarka and serves as a popular recreational area. Lillomarka is bordered by Maridalen and Nordmarka in the west, Nittedal and Gjelleråsen in the east, the suburbs Bjerke and Grorud in the south and the Gjøvik rail line and Movatn in the north.

== The name ==
The first element is the name of the farm Lillo (see Storo), the last element is the finite form of mark f 'woodland, forest'.

== History ==
Lillomarka contains the old Gothalfske copper mines, Alnsjø lake (one of Oslo’s sources of drinking water), and Breisjø lake. Several of the lakes in Lillomarka were used for harvesting ice; the ice dam at Årvoll and Vesletjern (Lilletjern) at Ammerud were both important sources of ice for the people of Oslo. Vesletjern was used until 1945, whereas ice was harvested from the ice-dam at Årvoll until as late as 1967-68. Today, Vesletjern is a public lake for swimming. In recent years Lillomarka has become a popular area for outdoor pursuits and physical recreation. The sports lodge at Linderudkollen is the site of a popular training facility for ski jumping.

[Linderud Mines or] Linderud gruver in Lillomarka had road infrastructure built in 1880.

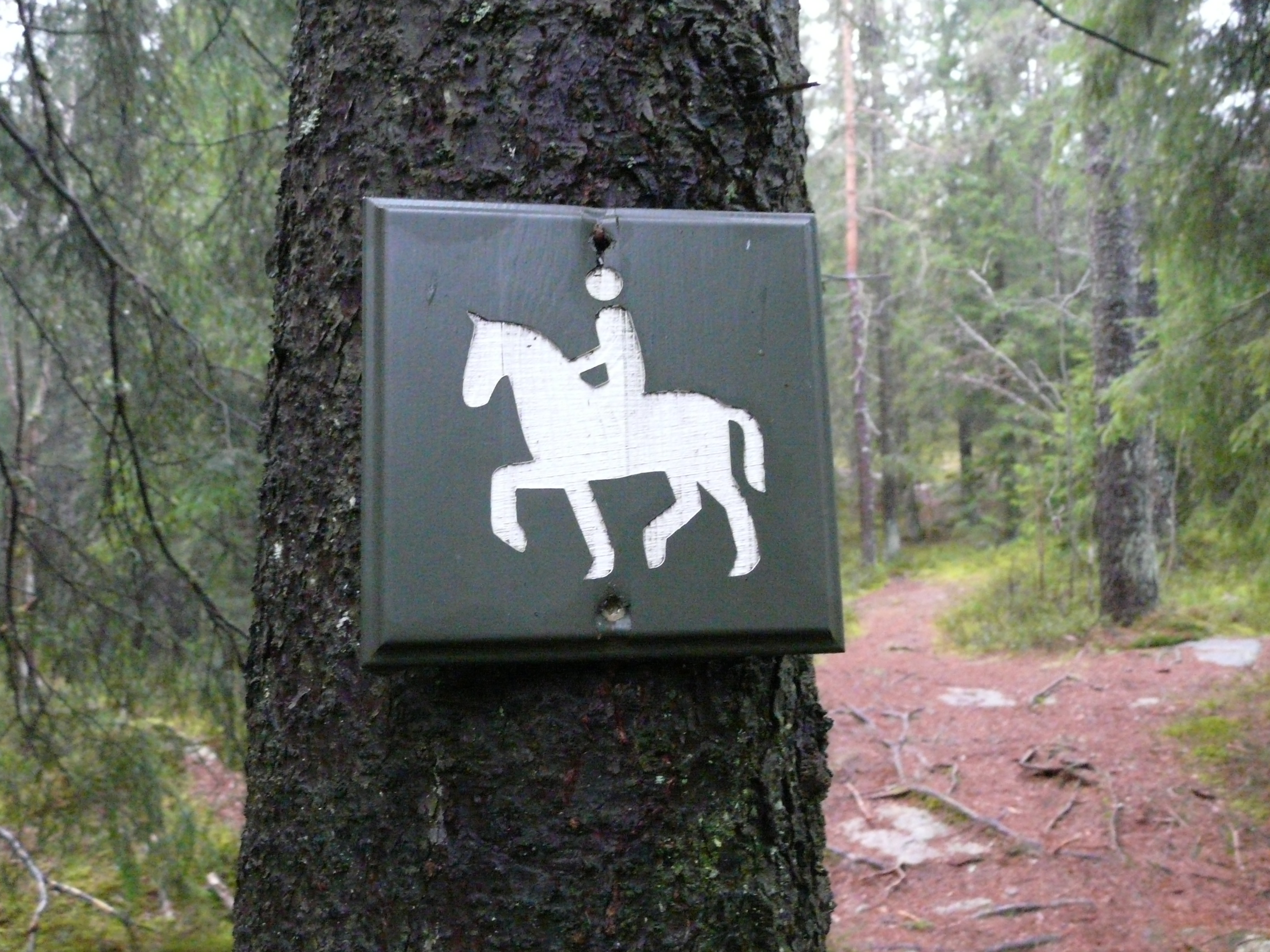
Bridle train in Lillomarka

== Outdoor pursuits in Lillomarka ==
Lillomarka’s location makes it quite accessible and it has become a popular setting for outdoor pursuits for the people who live around this forest. Lillomarka is considered by the Association for the Promotion of Skiing (Skiforeningen) as a good alternative to Nordmarka, especially during winter. The forest has many ponds and lakes that are suitable for camping trips. Fishing is also allowed throughout the forest in all ponds and lakes except for the drinking water reservoirs Alunsjø and Breidsjø. Both hiking and bridle path run through the area.

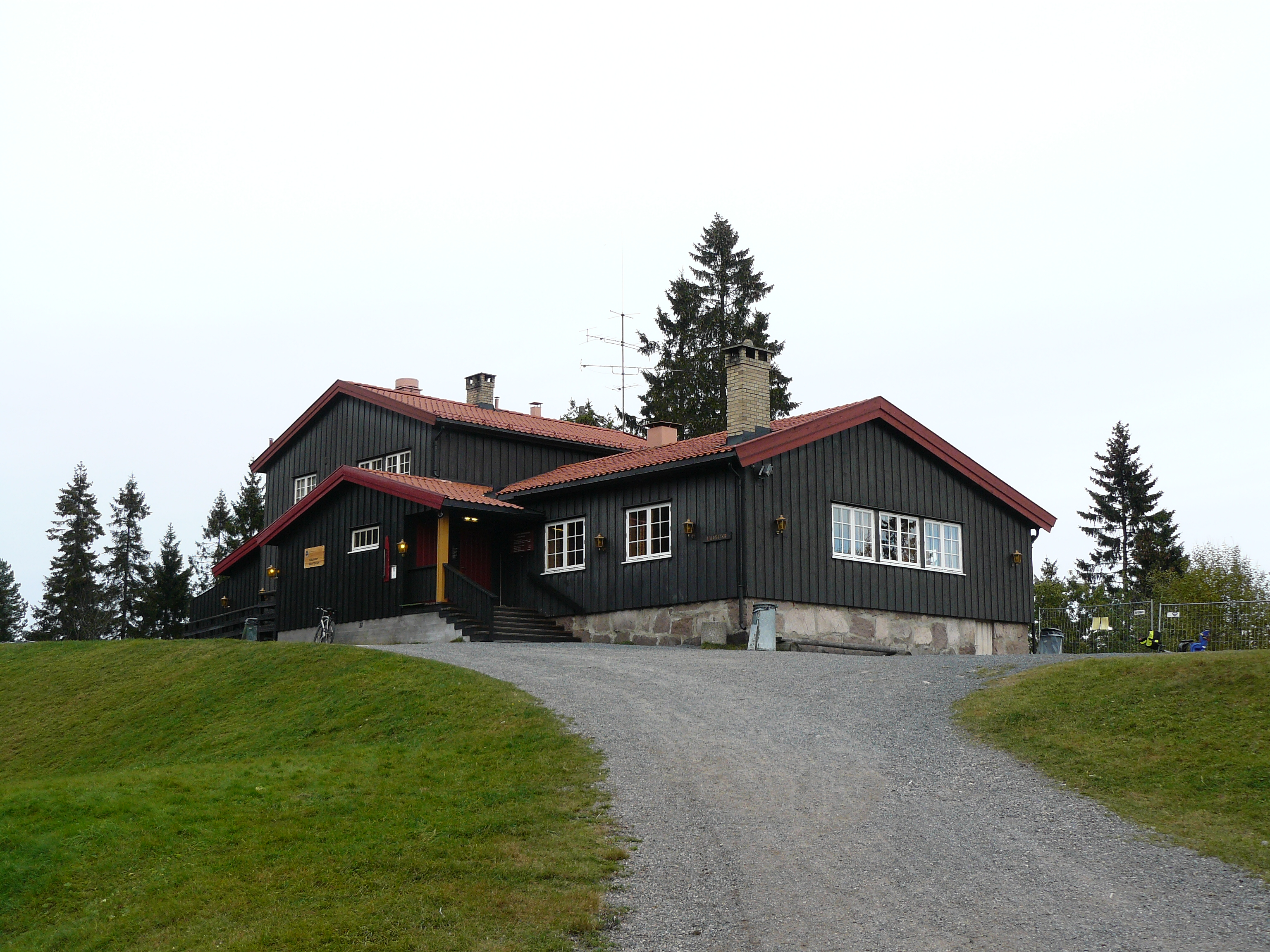
Lilloseter

=== Lodges in Lillomarka ===
Lillomarka has four sports lodges that are open most of the year: Lilloseter, Linderudkollen, Sinober and Trollvannstua. The Norwegian Trekking Association operates Fjellvang Lodge in Lillomarka, which can be rented for the night by the associations members. Additionally, located north of Kjulstern and south of Sinober, is the privately run Sørskogen lodge. At Steinbruvann, Grorud sports club has a club and ski waxing house.

=== Swimming ===
Between Ammerud and Grorud is Lake Steinbruvann, a popular swimming place. The dam was established when Steinbruvann was a drinking water reservoir (1936-1971) and itself closed for swimming. At Ammerud is Lake Vesletjern and near Grefsenkollen is Trollvann lake, not far from Trollvann lodge.

=== For education ===
Schools and kindergartens use Lillomarka both for short and longer trips in nature both summer and winter. The sports studies course at Bjerke upper secondary college utilise the forest for condition training (hiking, jogging and running), orienteering courses and outdoor pursuits courses. The Military college at Linderud has made and maintains good jogging and running paths. They have marked the paths every 1 and 5 kilometres.

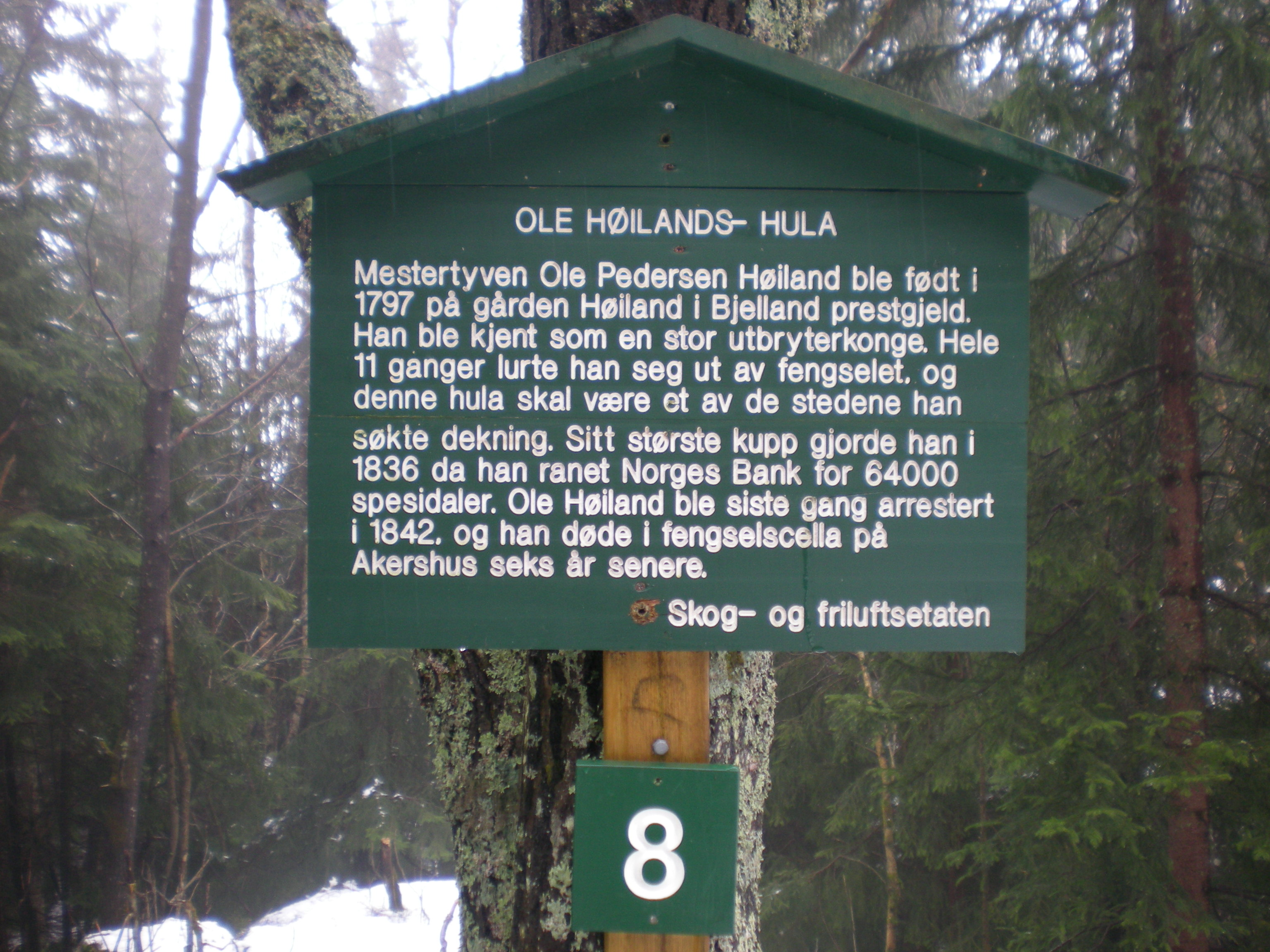
Ole Høiland cave in Lillomarka

=== Orienteering ===
Lill-O-Dilten is the orienteering course for walkers, set up by Lillomarka Orienteering Team. Lillodilten consists of many posts of varying difficulty that are open during the warmer six months of the year. The easiest route is called Mini-O-dilten with posts close to Grorud and Ammerud. The more difficult maps have posts located far apart with some quite far north in the forest.

In the 1830s a local thief and robber, Ole Høiland (1797–1848), had a hideout in Lillomarka. The Norwegian Trekking Association (DNT) organises regular trips to Ole Høiland’s cave.

=== Winter pursuits ===
In the winter Lillomarka has a good selection of prepared ski trails, several of which are lit. The city of Oslo takes care of most of the trails in Lillomarka.

== Gallery ==
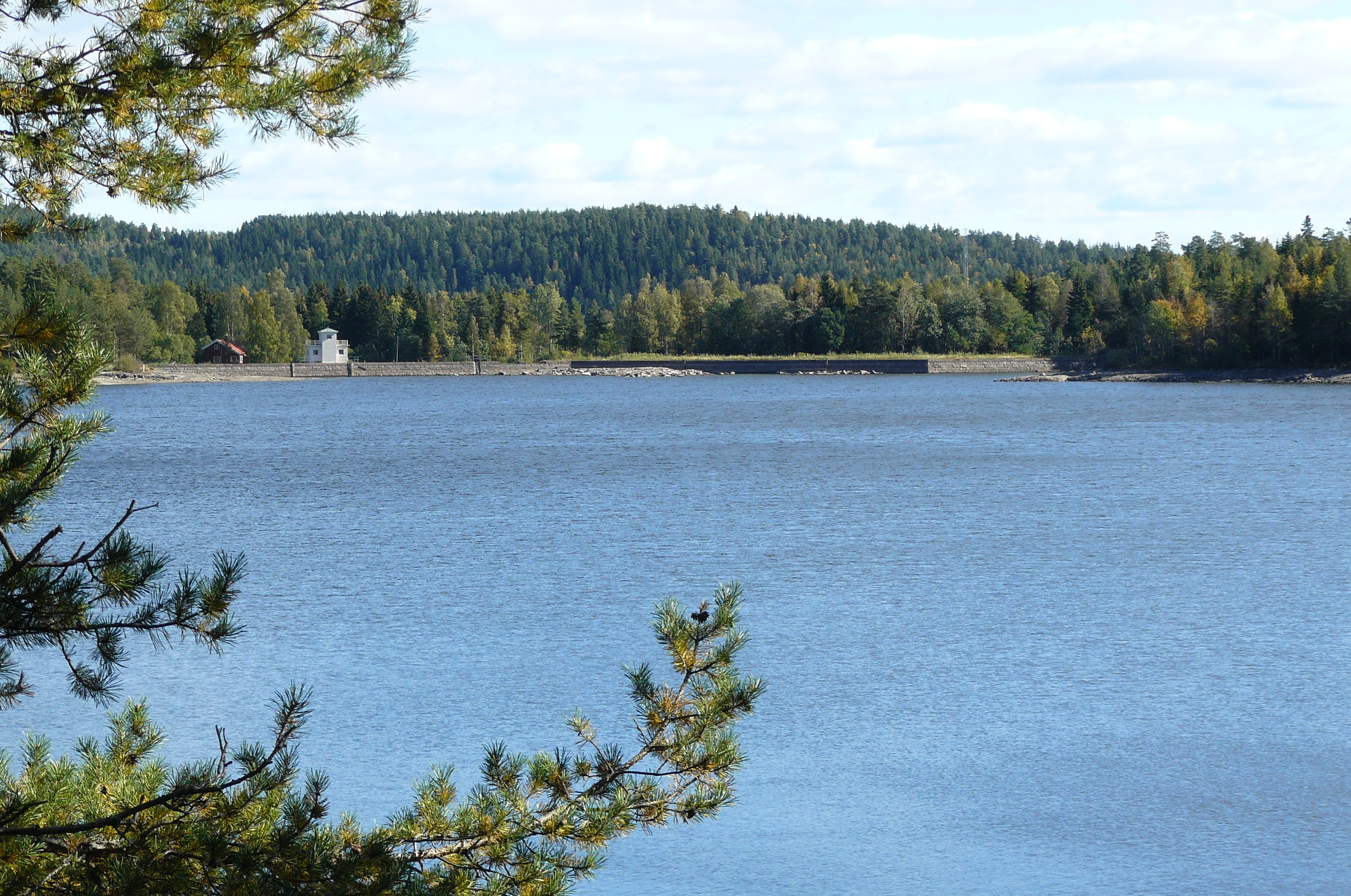
Alunsjøen, Lillomarka

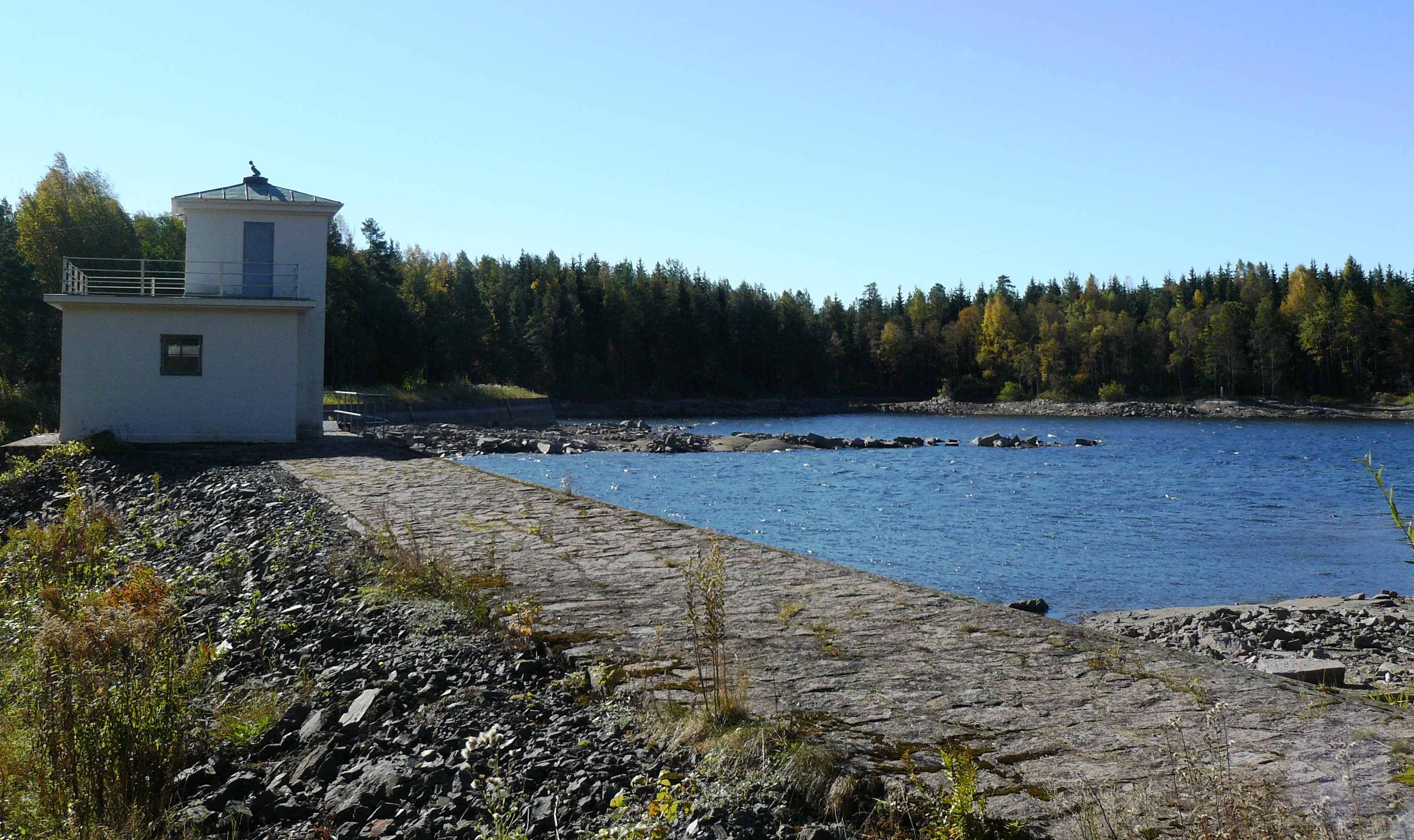
Alundammen, Ammerud

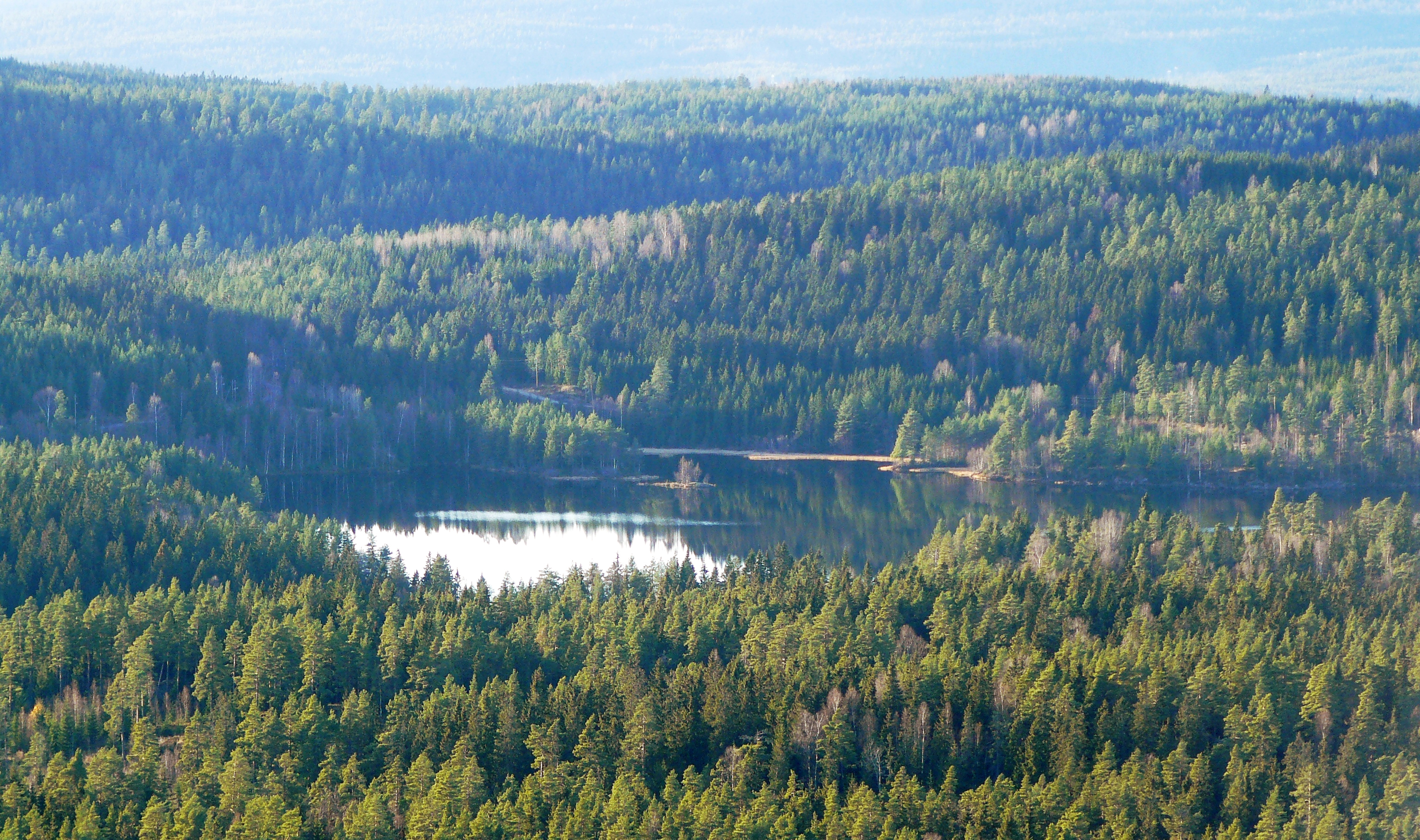
Breisjøen in Lillomarka seen from Romsås

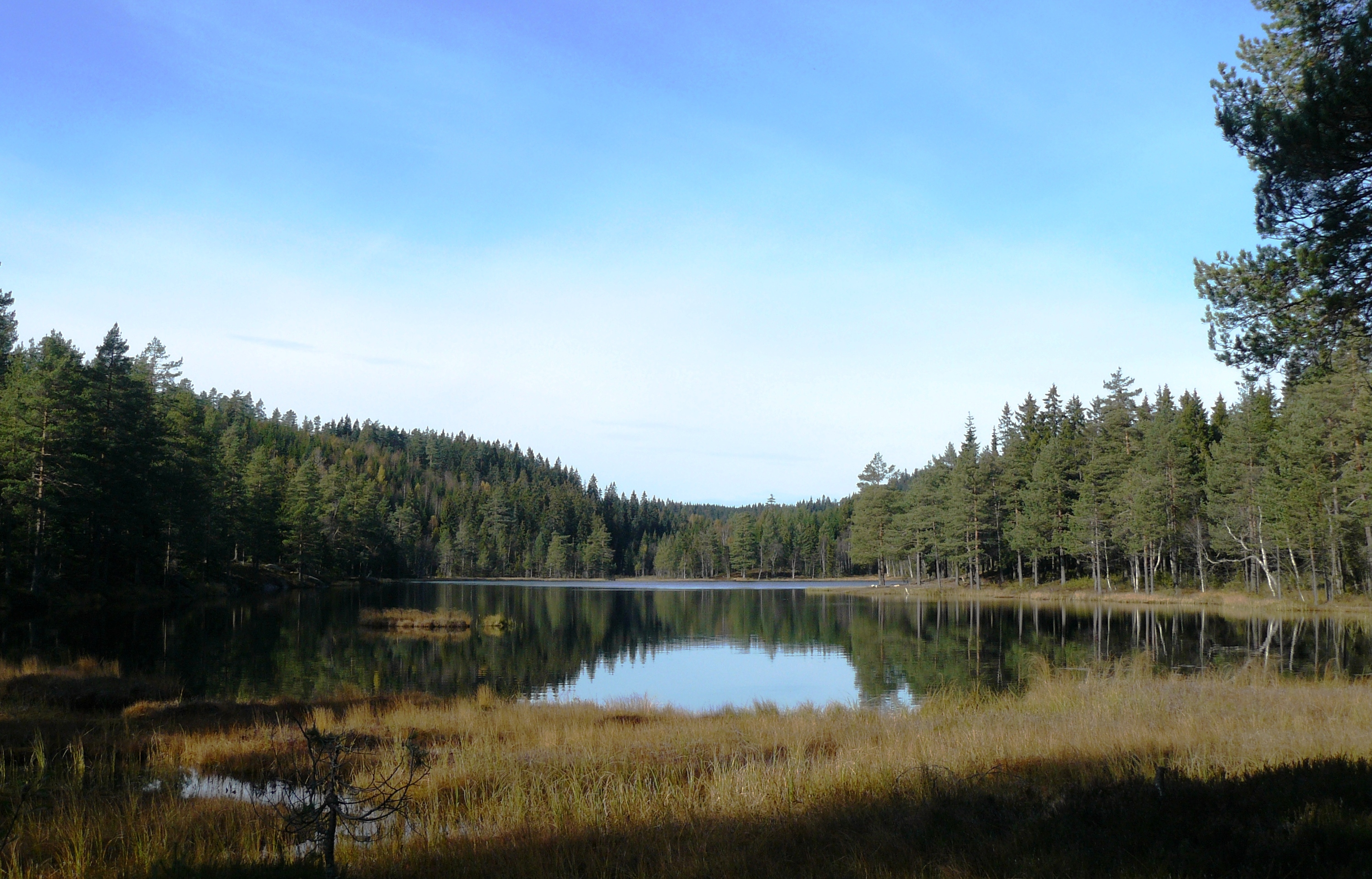
Kjulstjernet, Lillomarka

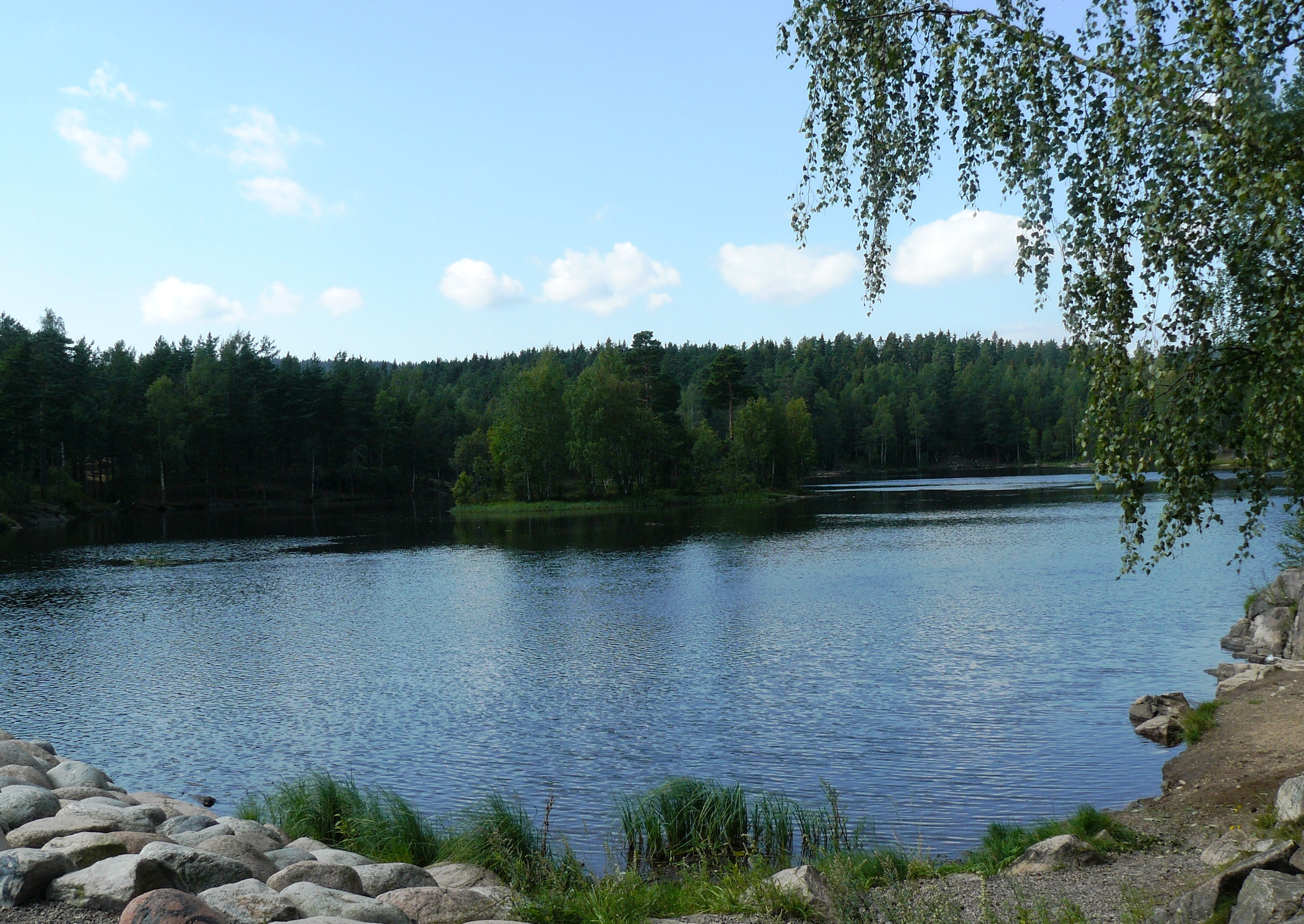
Vesletjern, Ammerud

== Other sources ==
- Revil, Bjørn (2008) Markaguiden (Gyldendal) ISBN 978-82-05-37903-9
