= Romsås =

Neighborhood in Oslo, Norway

Coordinates: 59°57′54″N 10°53′35″E

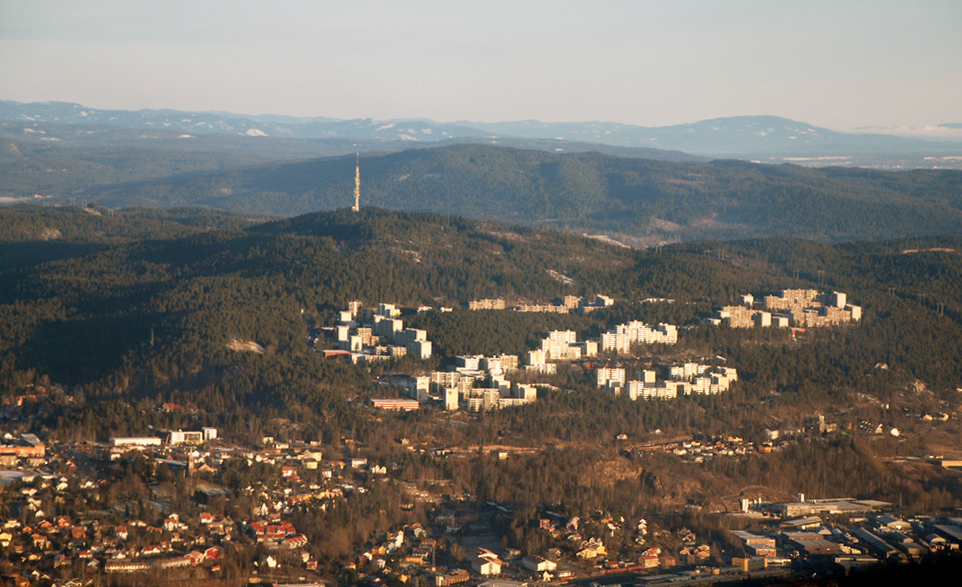
Groruddalen with the hill of Romsås in the background

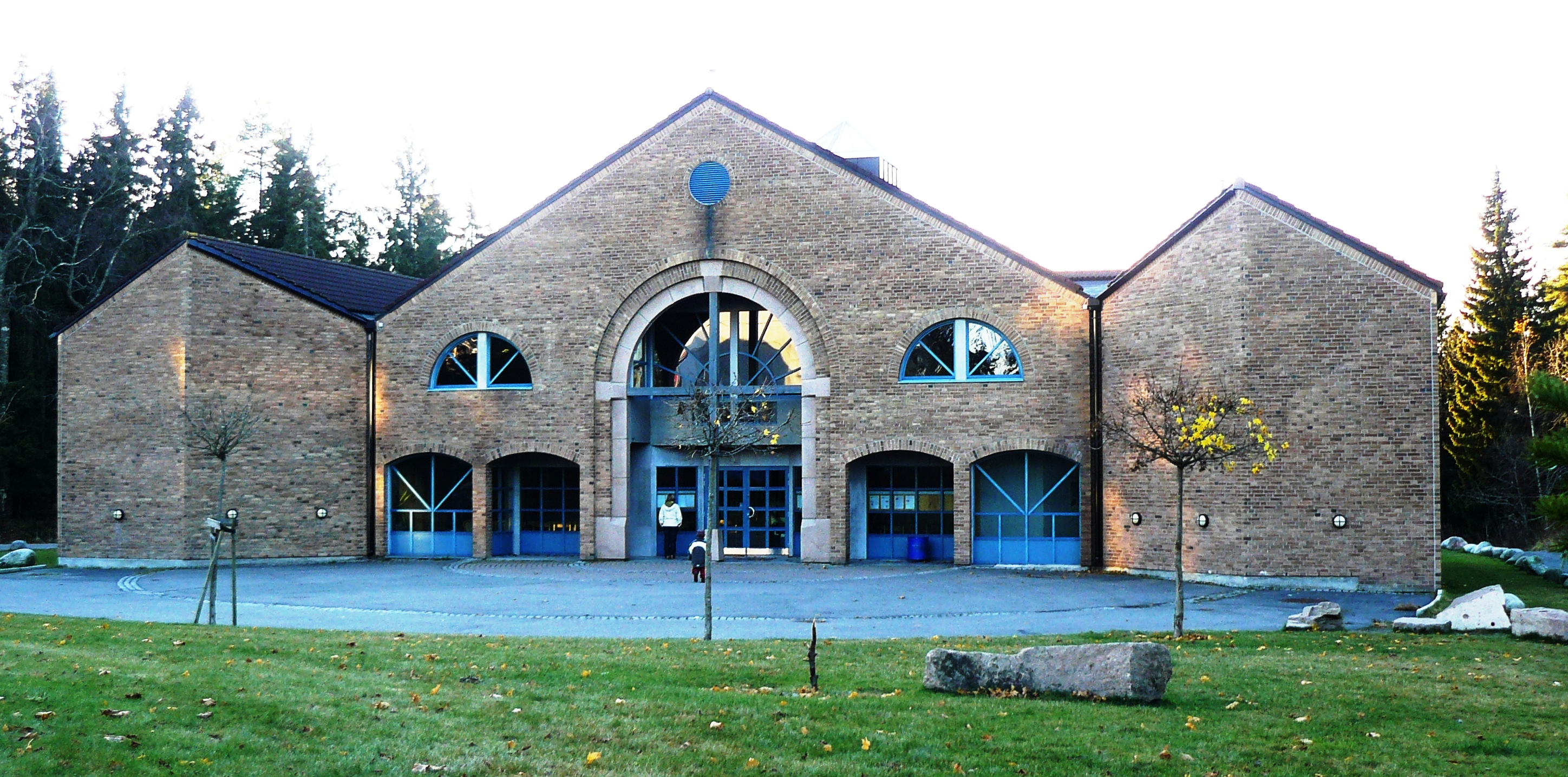
Romsås Church

Romsås is a neighborhood in the city of Oslo, Norway. Located northeast of Groruddalen, at the edge of Lillomarka, Romsås was formerly its own borough but was merged into the larger borough of Grorud on January 1, 2004. The name Romsås originated with the Romsås farm which by 1850 was one of the biggest farms in Østre Aker.

== History ==
With the expansion of Oslo after the Second World War, Oslo kommune granted OBOS, a housing company, a permit to build a new borough in 1967. Construction started in 1969. The borough was formally established in 1973.

== Subdivisions ==
Romsås is divided into six borettslag named after local geographical features: Orremyr, Emanuelfjell, Svarttjern, Røverkollen, Ravnkollen, and Tiurleiken. There are also six kindergartens, two elementary schools, a middle school, an assisted living facility (Romsåslia), and a center (Romsås senter) with social housing, a retirement home, shops and services, and a swimming pool. A subway station is located under the center, 50 m below ground level.

With the exception of Romsåslia and the church, all buildings are located on the inside of a single road which starts at Grorud and loops back on itself in the shape of an elongated “q”.

== Romsås Church ==
Romsås Church (Romsås kirke) is a 220-seat brick church designed in a postmodern style by architect Arne E. Sæther, with an altarpiece by Nina Sundbye. It was built on the ruins of an earlier wooden structure which burned down in 1986, and was inaugurated in 1995. As the site was formerly a landfill, the church has suffered significant subsidence damage since its construction.
