= Alnsjøen =

Lake in Oslo, Norway

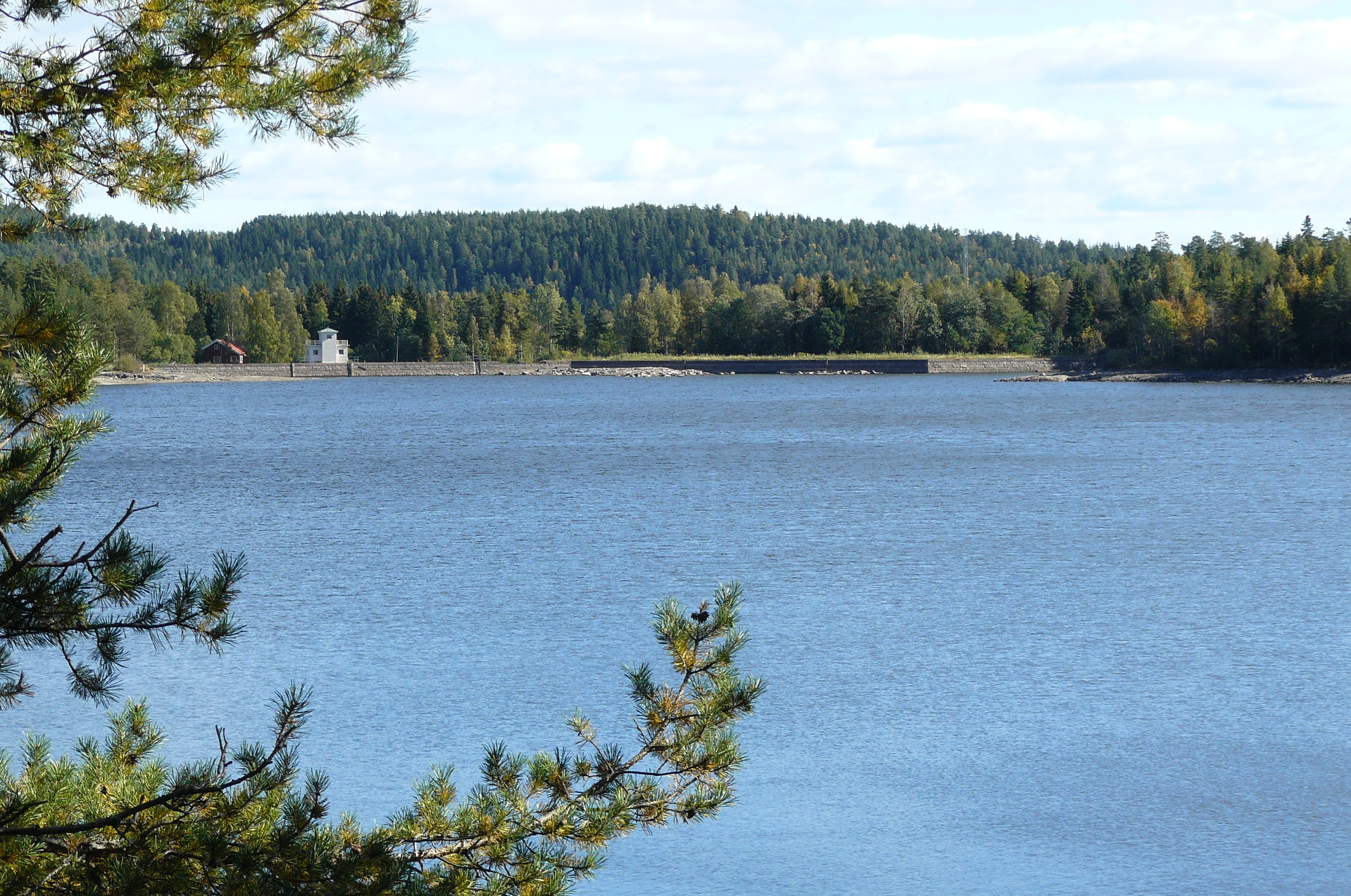
- Alunsjøen (2007)

- Location within Norway
- Location: Oslo
- Coordinates: 59°57′56″N 10°51′6″E
- Basin countries: Norway
- Surface area: 39 ha (96 acres)
- Average depth: 32 m (105 ft)
- Water volume: 7.56 km^{3} (6,130,000 acre⋅ft)
- Surface elevation: 183 m (600 ft)
- References: NVE

Alnsjøen (also called Alunsjøen) is a lake in Lillomarka in Oslo, Norway. The lake is drained by the Alna River to the Oslofjord. The surrounding area was utilized for copper mining during the 18th century. The lake functions as a minor water reservoir for the city of Oslo (the main water reservoir being the lake Maridalsvannet).

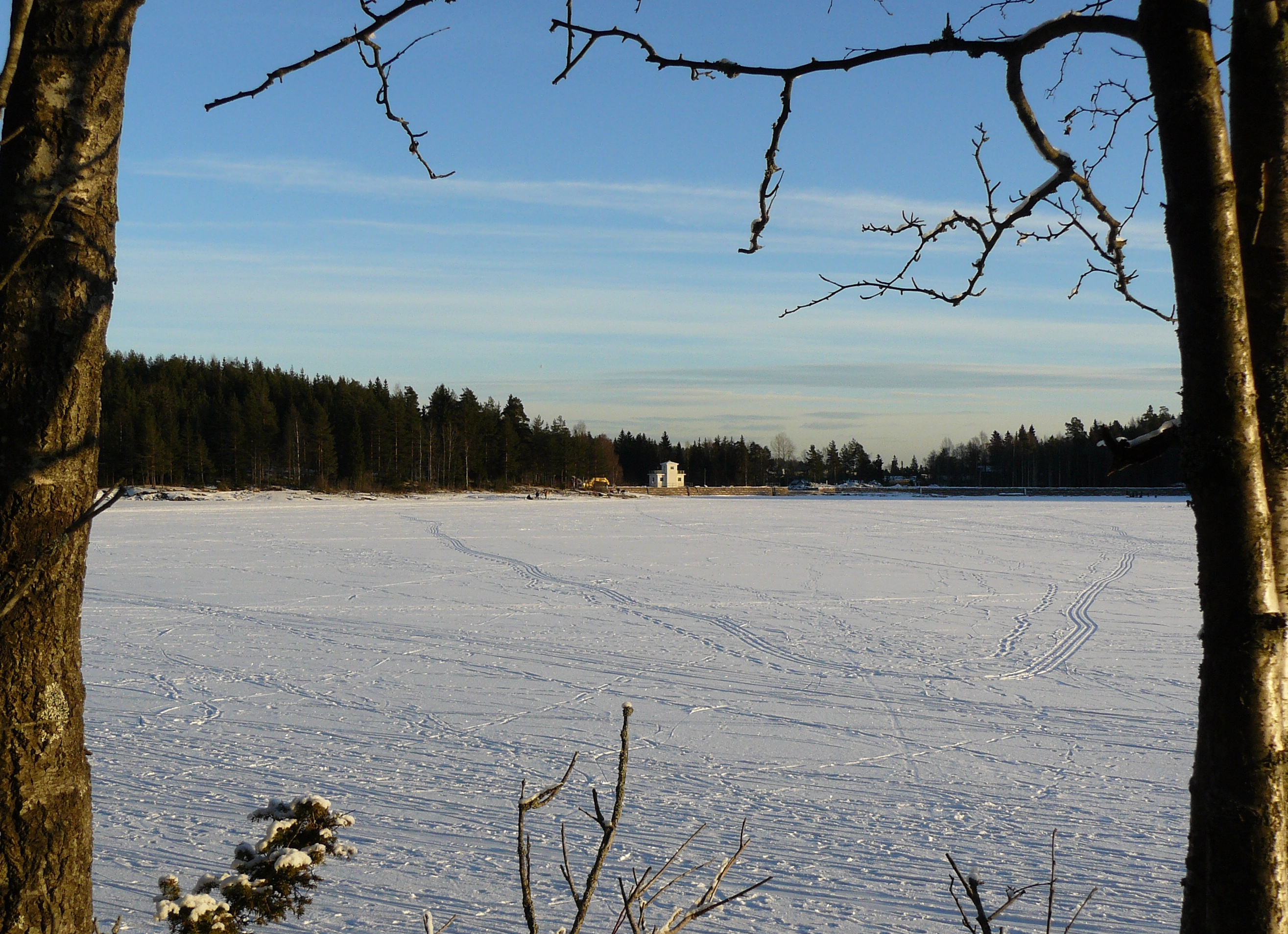
Alnsjøen in winter

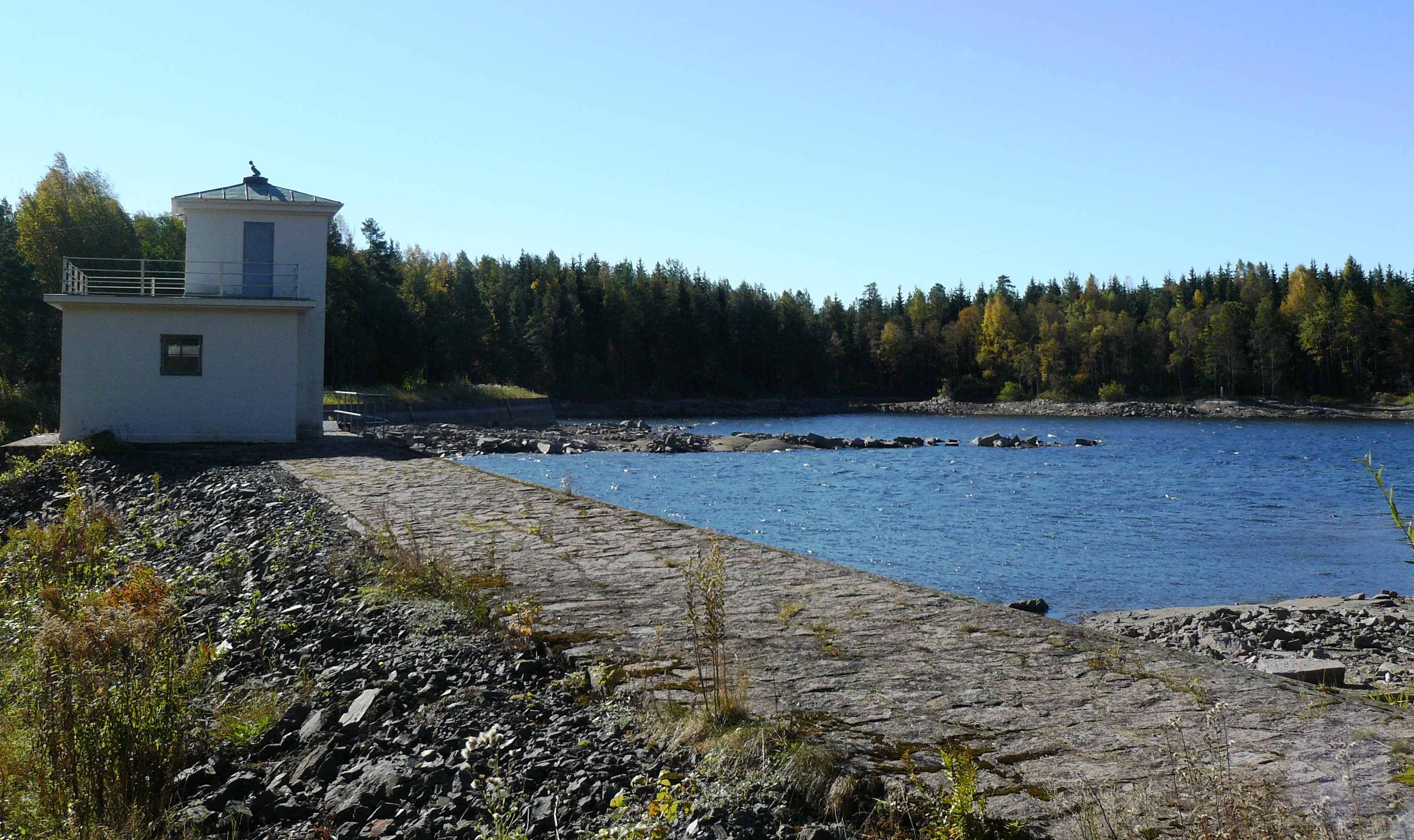
The dam of Alnsjøen
