= Alna (river) =

Norwegian river

Coordinates: 59°55′26.6″N 10°48′23.14″E

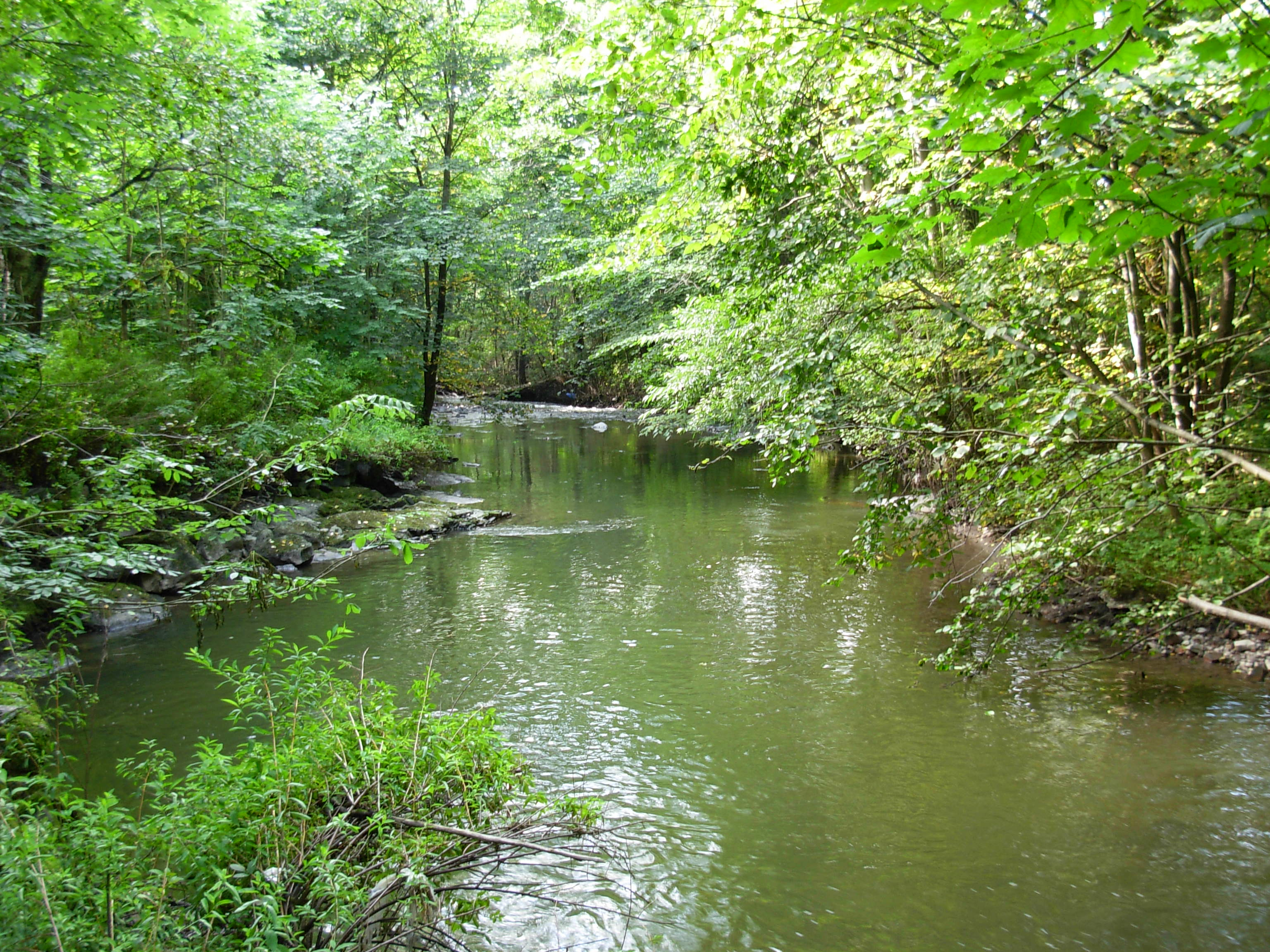
Svartdalen

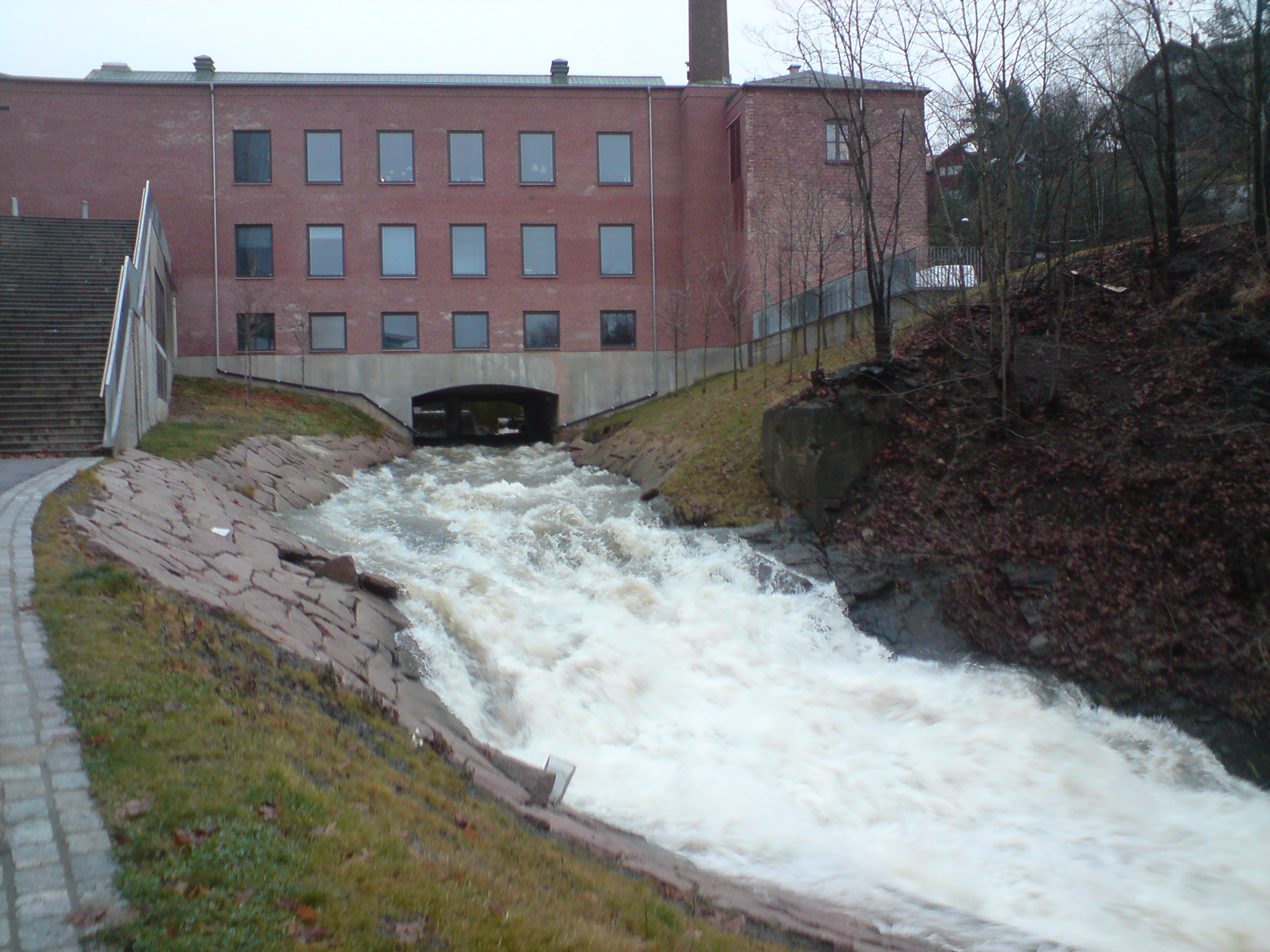
Brynfoss

The Alna (Norwegian: Alnaelva) is a river that runs through Oslo, Norway, from Alnsjøen to the Oslo Fjord at Bjørvika. It also drains Breisjøen, Steinbruvann, Tokerudbekken, and Østensjøvannet. It runs through the boroughs of Gamle Oslo, Nordstrand, Helsfyr, Østensjø, Alna, and Grorud. Large sections of the river run in culverts and the river is highly polluted, partially because it is used as a sewer drain.

The Municipality of Oslo is creating linked walking trails and green spaces along the length of the Alna.
