= Boot Boys =

Norwegian far-right organization

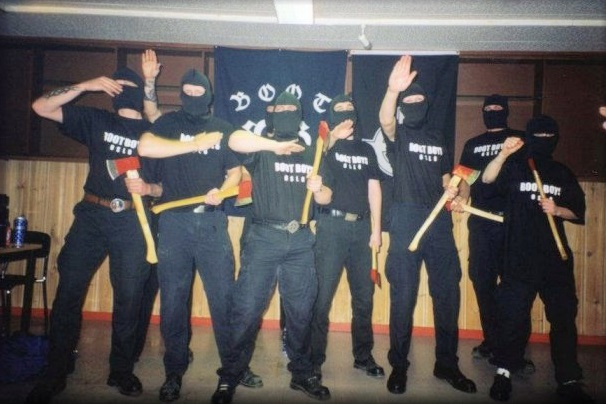
- Leader: Ole Nicolai Kvisler
- Founded: 1995
- Dates active: 1995–2001
- Country: Norway
- Ideology: Norwegian ultranationalism; Neo-Nazism; Anti-semitism; Anti-communism
- Political position: Far-right

The Boot Boys was a Norwegian neo-Nazi militant organization from Bøler, a district south in Oslo, with connections to individual groups in Bergen and Kristiansand. Consisting of about 50 members, it was considered one of the most violent neo-Nazi groups in Norway. The organization was founded in 1995 and had an active role for many years. The group was known for having racist, right wing extremist and xenophobic views. When the neo-Nazi community in Bøler was mobilized in the autumn of 2000, about 10–12 young men were in control of a certain area. Right-wing extreme marches were being held in the streets, graffiti of swastikas were sprayed on buildings and a recreational park was being held under occupation. Daniel de Linde was one of the group's leading members. Other members included Joe Erling Jahr and Ole Nicolai Kvisler, who was later convicted of the politically motivated and racist murder of Benjamin Hermansen on 26 January 2001.

== See also ==
- Nordic Resistance Movement
- Alliance – Alternative for Norway
- National Socialist Underground
- Anders Behring Breivik
