= Kampen, Norway =

Neighborhood in Oslo, Norway

Coordinates: 59.9137°N 10.7794°E

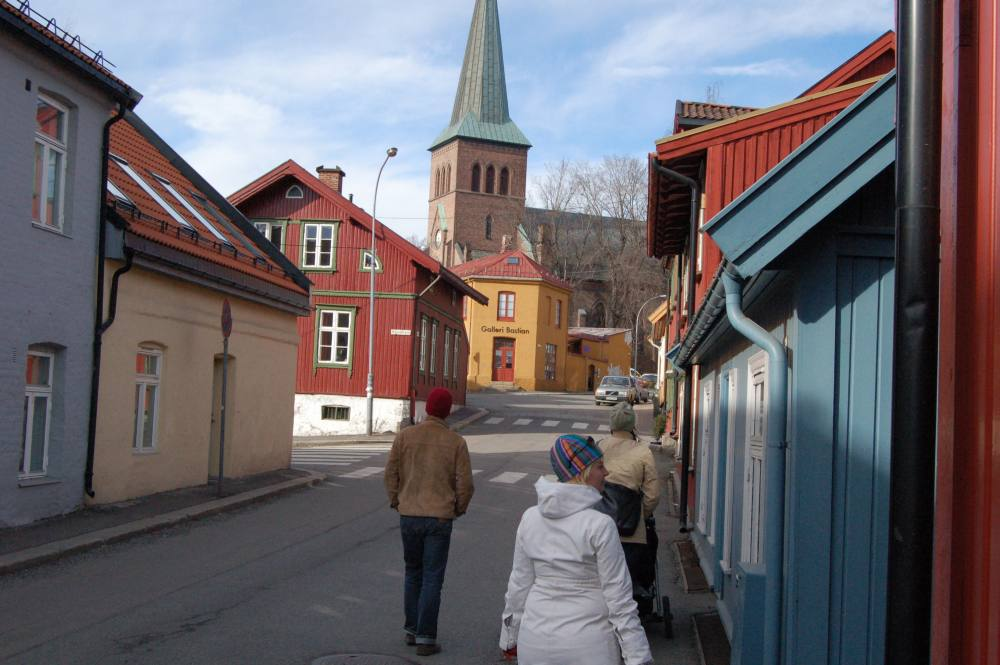
Traditional housing in Kampen

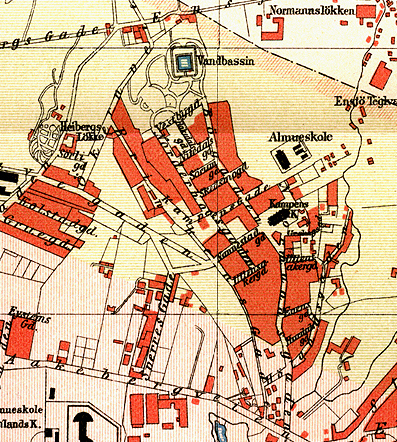
Map of Kampen from 1887

Kampen is a neighborhood in Oslo, Norway. It is located Gamle Oslo borough, between Tøyen, Hasle, Vålerenga and Galgeberg.

== History ==
The name may come from kamp, meaning outcrop, though it may also come from a military campment. During the 18th century, the home guard had military practices at Kampen. The area belonged to the farms Bergsløkken and Oslo Ladegård, before being parcelled up in 1820. A wooden suburb was built between the city expansions—meaning acquisitions of territory belonging to Aker municipality—of 1859 and 1878. Part of the wooden housing burned down in 1879, and was replaced with brick block housing and Kampen Church. The northern part of Kampen has many brick buildings from the 1930s, though the wooden housing still dominates in other parts. There was a controversy related to demolition and rebuilding in Brinken during the 1980s. In August 2025, Tamima Nibras Juhar was killed in Kampen. The 18-year-old murder suspect Djordje Wilms was charged with terrorism in relation to the murder.
