= Murder of Benjamin Hermansen =

2001 racially motivated murder in Oslo, Norway

- Location: Oslo, Norway
- Date: January 26, 2001
- Attack type: Stabbing
- Weapon: Knife
- Deaths: 1
- Motive: Right-wing extremism, racism, xenophobia

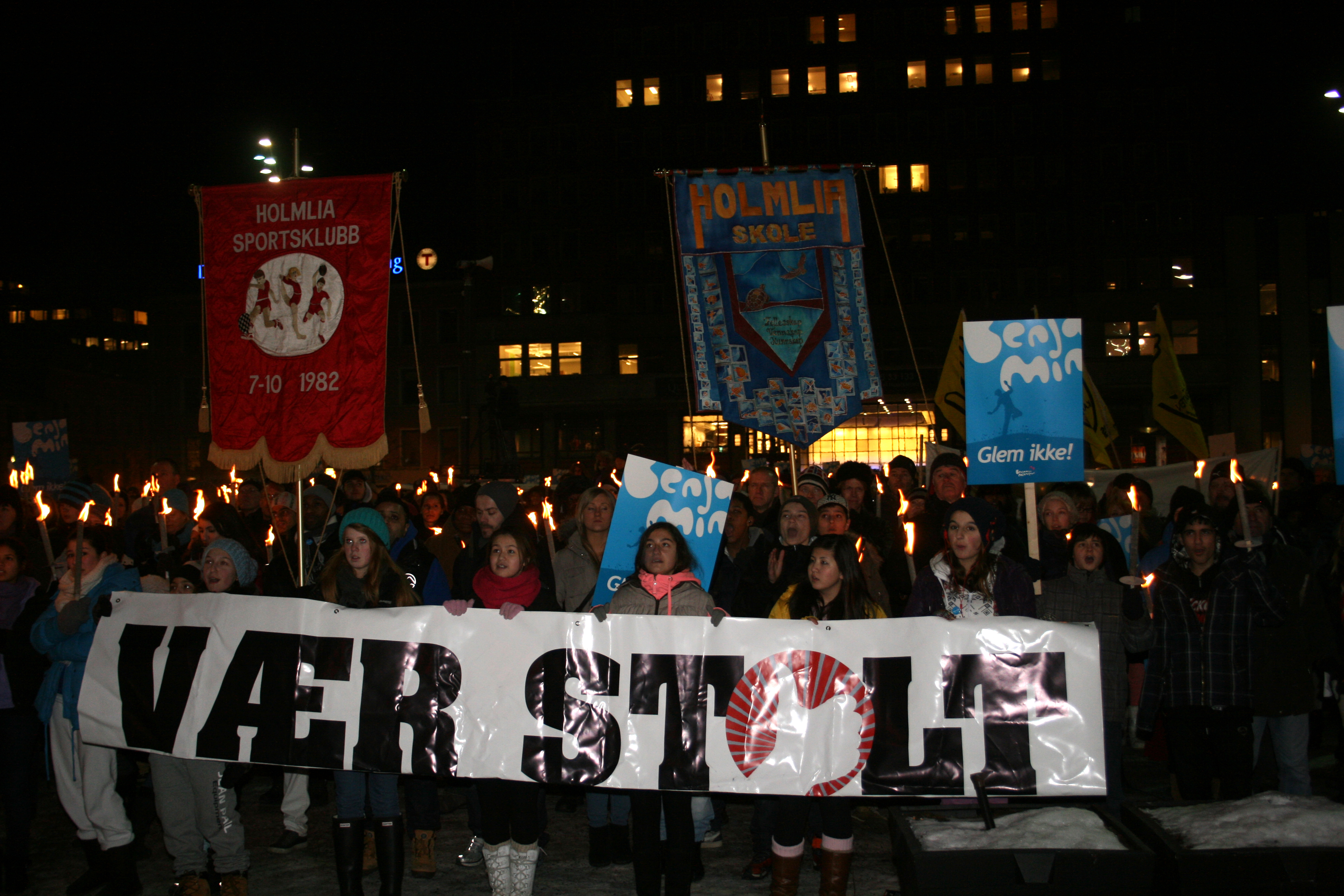
Youths from Benjamin's neighborhood Holmlia stand in Youngstorget, 2011, to commemorate the tenth anniversary of his death. The banner they are holding reads "Be Proud."

Benjamin Hermansen (29 May 1985 – 26 January 2001) was a Norwegian youth whose father was born in Ghana; his mother was Norwegian. He was stabbed to death at Holmlia in Oslo, Norway, just before midnight on 26 January 2001 by members of the neo-Nazi group Boot Boys. Joe Erling Jahr (born 1981) and Ole Nicolai Kvisler (born 1979) were convicted of the murder and sentenced to 16 and 15 years in prison respectively. A third defendant, Veronica Andreassen, was convicted on a lesser charge of abetting bodily harm causing death and sentenced to three years in prison. The murder was treated as a racially motivated attack, while other terrorism experts have seen it as a politically motivated attack, citing right-wing extremism.

== Response to the murder ==
Since the murder was motivated by right-wing extremism, xenophobia and racism, it mobilised parts of the Norwegian population, mainly in the capital Oslo. Throughout the entire country, marches were organised to protest against the murder, with nearly 40,000 people participating in Oslo.

== "Song to Benjamin" ==
Hermansen was buried on 6 February 2001. "Song to Benjamin", written by several of his friends for the service, was presented at his funeral. The song was later recorded in studio by artists including Noora Noor and Briskeby.

== Benjamin Prize ==
In 2003, the Benjamin Prize was founded in Hermansen's memory. It is awarded on 27 January every year.

== Michael Jackson's Invincible ==
American singer Michael Jackson dedicated his 2001 album Invincible to Benjamin Hermansen (and also to his own parents and grandmother). The reason for this has partly to do with the fact that the artist and dancer Omer Bhatti from Holmlia and Jackson were close friends, and Bhatti was at the same time a good friend of Benjamin Hermansen. On the album cover, next to the image of a rose, it reads:

Michael Jackson gives "special thanks": «This album is dedicated to Benjamin ‘Benny’ Hermansen. May we continue to remember not to judge man by the color of his skin, but the content of his character. Benjamin … we love you … may you rest in peace.»

== Perpetrators ==
After their release from prison, Kvisler resumed his activities in the neo-Nazi community mostly online, while Jahr apologised for the murder and said it was an attack that accidentally ended up fatal.

=== Appeals ===
Kvisler and Jahr appealed the sentence to the Borgarting Court of Appeal and had the sentence increased by an additional two years. The appeal to the Supreme Court was rejected. The sentences of 17 and 18 years for Kvisler and Jahr, were upheld.

=== Ole Nicolai Kvisler ===
Ole Nicolai Kvisler (b. July 23 1979) is a Norwegian convicted murderer and former member of the Boot Boys who received a 15-year prison sentence for his role in the right-wing extremist and racially motivated murder of Hermansen on 26 January 2001. In the criminal case, Kvisler was counseled by attorney Geir Lippestad, who would later defend the terrorist and mass murderer Anders Behring Breivik for the 2011 Norway attacks.

== See also ==
- Racism in Norway
- Murder of Tamima Nibras Juhar
