= 2019 Bærum murder and mosque attack =

Murder and terrorist attack in Norway

Bærum mosque shooting
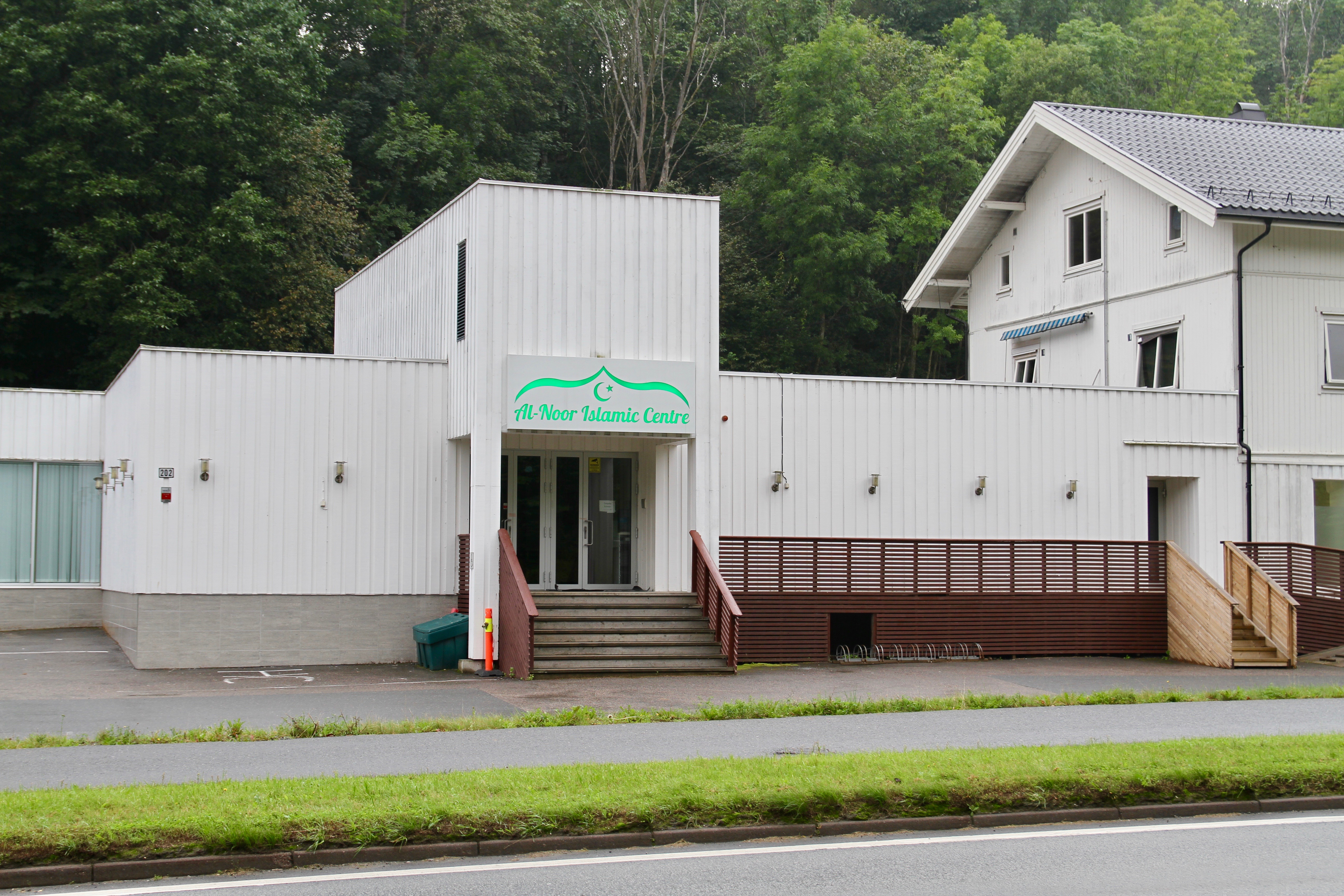
- Al-Noor Islamic Centre in Bærum

- Bærum (Viken (county)) Bærum (Norway)
- Location: 59.9200°N 10.4595°E; Al-Noor Islamic Centre, Bærum, Norway
- Date: August 10, 2019; 7 years ago approx. 16:00 (CEST (UTC+02:00))
- Target: Immigrants
- Attack type: Shooting, sororicide, attempted mass murder
- Weapons: Swedish Mauser 1896-38 rifle; Baikal IJ-27E double-barreled shotgun; Remington Model 572 Fieldmaster rifle
- Deaths: Johanne Ihle-Hansen
- Injuries: Mohammad Rafiq and the perpetrator
- Perpetrator: Philip Manshaus
- Defender: Mohammad Rafiq
- Motive: Neo-Nazism
- Convictions: Murder, committing a terrorist attack

On 10 August 2019, the 21-year-old neo-Nazi Philip Manshaus murdered his 17-year-old adopted sister Johanne Zhangjia Ihle-Hansen at their home in Bærum, Akershus, Norway. He then drove to the Al-Noor Islamic Centre and broke into the building by shooting a glass door. Inside, Manshaus opened fire, but hit no one as the mosque was almost empty since prayer service had already ended. He was subdued by three elderly worshippers after a scuffle, and turned over to police. He had attempted to livestream the shooting, but failed.

Manshaus was fixated on far-right conspiracy theories and mass shootings, and had been investigated in 2018 after a tip was filed over his neo-Nazi views. The tip was not followed up on, as it was deemed to be vague and lacked signs he was planning a violent attack. He murdered Ihle-Hansen due to her being of Asian (Chinese) ethnicity, and the mosque shooting was done to intimidate immigrants; the attack was inspired by the Christchurch mosque shootings, which had occurred earlier in the year. The guns were stolen from Manshaus's father.

Manshaus was convicted of murder and committing an act of terrorism, and in 2020 was sentenced to 21 years preventative detention, an order which, in Norway, can be extended indefinitely. The case was reopened in 2024, after experts assessed that Manshaus had likely been psychotic since 2017, including while the crime was committed. In October 2025, Manshaus was resentenced to 21 years in prison, this time without extended detention, with the court citing his abandonment of far-right extremism and lack of previous convictions for violent crimes as its rationale.

== Background ==
Philip Manshaus (born 29 August 1997), a 21-year-old resident of Bærum, perpetrated the attack. His biological mother and grandmother died by suicide when he was four years old. He had attended the liberal arts craft school Fosen Folkehøgskole (a folk high school). He has two older brothers. In his youth, he was known to have many different phases; his stepmother noted he would often become fixated on strange things and become extreme about them. He had a history of experimenting with drugs; at the age of 15, he drove while on LSD and got into a car accident. He had been in a gay relationship with another boy in Oslo's emo scene.

Johanne Zhangjia Ihle-Hansen was born on 18 June 2002 in Jiangxi, China, and adopted at 9 months old by Manshaus's stepmother. At her high school, she majored in communications and media. She had a boyfriend from Portugal, who she hoped to move in with after finishing her schooling. She aimed to become a journalist. Manshaus and Ihle-Hansen had previously been very close, and Manshaus was said to have been protective of her; while coverage described them as adopted step-siblings, they viewed each other as full siblings and she was a fully accepted member of their family. A childhood friend of both siblings described Ihle-Hansen as looking up to Manshaus.

=== Radicalization ===
Beginning in the summer of 2017, Manshaus had been interested in conspiracy theories. He openly discussed with his friends antisemitic conspiracy theories about the Holocaust and attempted to convince them of his beliefs, which led to his friends avoiding him. Other students noticed a change in his personality and worried that he would kill someone, or that Manshaus would get killed; he became increasingly Christian and radical. His internet activity included him reading about school shootings in Finland and in the United States; he was interested in "alt-right" and neo-Nazi materials online, reading among others the works of Jordan Peterson, James Mason's Siege, and the manifesto of Norwegian terrorist Anders Behring Breivik.

On 18 June 2018, a tip about Manshaus was sent to the PST, the domestic intelligence service in Norway, stating that he had far-right views and that his friends called him a neo-Nazi. After coordinating with the local police department, Oslo Police District, they found that the tip was vague and showed no signs Manshaus had any plans to commit a violent attack. Manshaus was not interviewed and the tip was not followed up on. Manshaus's family were not informed of the report. He frequently visited imageboards, which contributed to his radicalization.

Their family worried about him, and after Ihle-Hansen told their mother of her concerns, Ihle-Hansen suggested they try to take him along with them for normal activities and introduce him to non-ethnic Norwegians so he could make friends. However, she was unsettled and uncomfortable with his behavior. Ihle-Hansen sent various messages to others through the messaging app Discord expressing frustration and concern over Manshaus's views, and said she did not feel safe. He became increasingly extreme in his anti-immigration and antisemitic attitudes, and became cold towards Ihle-Hansen. He refused to greet her and said cruel things to her. He told Ihle-Hansen that she and her boyfriend should not have children because it would be "race mixing", and said that she was not his sister because to be his sister "she would have had to be human". He also made fun of her for her skin color, knowing she was insecure about it.

== Planning ==
In the weeks before the attack, Manshaus tried to join the neo-Nazi Nordic Resistance Movement, but due to an internal split in the organization and delays in their membership system he never got beyond the first of two planned initiation interviews. Manshaus joined a gun club and indicated that he would try to get semi-automatic weapons. At one point, Ihle-Hansen was delivered a package for him that contained a bulletproof vest.

On 15 March 2019, Brenton Tarrant committed an anti-Muslim terrorist mass shooting in Christchurch, New Zealand, killing 51 people and livestreaming the attack. Along with the shooting Tarrant self published a manifesto; Manshaus witnessed the livestream around the time of the attack but this did not have an impact, and he only read the manifesto on 2 August 2019. After Manshaus read it, it deeply affected him, and he slept and ate little for several days; he viewed it as a "call" for him to "take action". Manshaus drafted a manifesto, but did not finish it. Manshaus's family noticed he had attached newspaper clippings about the Christchurch mosque shootings, a swastika, and information on other terrorist attacks to his wall, and hid it behind a Norwegian flag, after which Ihle-Hansen became afraid he would hurt someone. After he learned his stepmother was considering reporting him to the PST, he took them down, and tried to make it seem as if he was no longer far right.

On 8 August, Ihle-Hansen told a friend that it was difficult at home because "my brother hates me", and said that she was afraid of Manshaus. The day before her murder, she texted her boyfriend and expressed frustration with Manshaus's racist views, and told him that his room was full of "Nazi propaganda and newspaper clippings about mass shootings". She said she felt unsafe and that what she was going through was "madness". She also said he was then listening to a speech that expressed racist views against those of Chinese descent. After Ihle-Hansen expressed to her friends her concerns, they decided to inform Ihle-Hansen's mother and inform the police or PST. When she was informed on the morning of 10 August she agreed to inform the PST.

Manshaus had a planned list for the attack, listing his weapons and the address of the Islamic Center, as well as "MURDER AT HOME" in all capital letters. He later said that he had decided to kill her because she was not white, and a result he believed that if she was alive, their parents would be deemed "race traitors" during what he viewed as an imminent race war, and that she "represents a group that threatens my people". The mosque attack was planned to intimidate immigrants in Norway, and to kill "as many non-whites as possible".

== Shootings ==
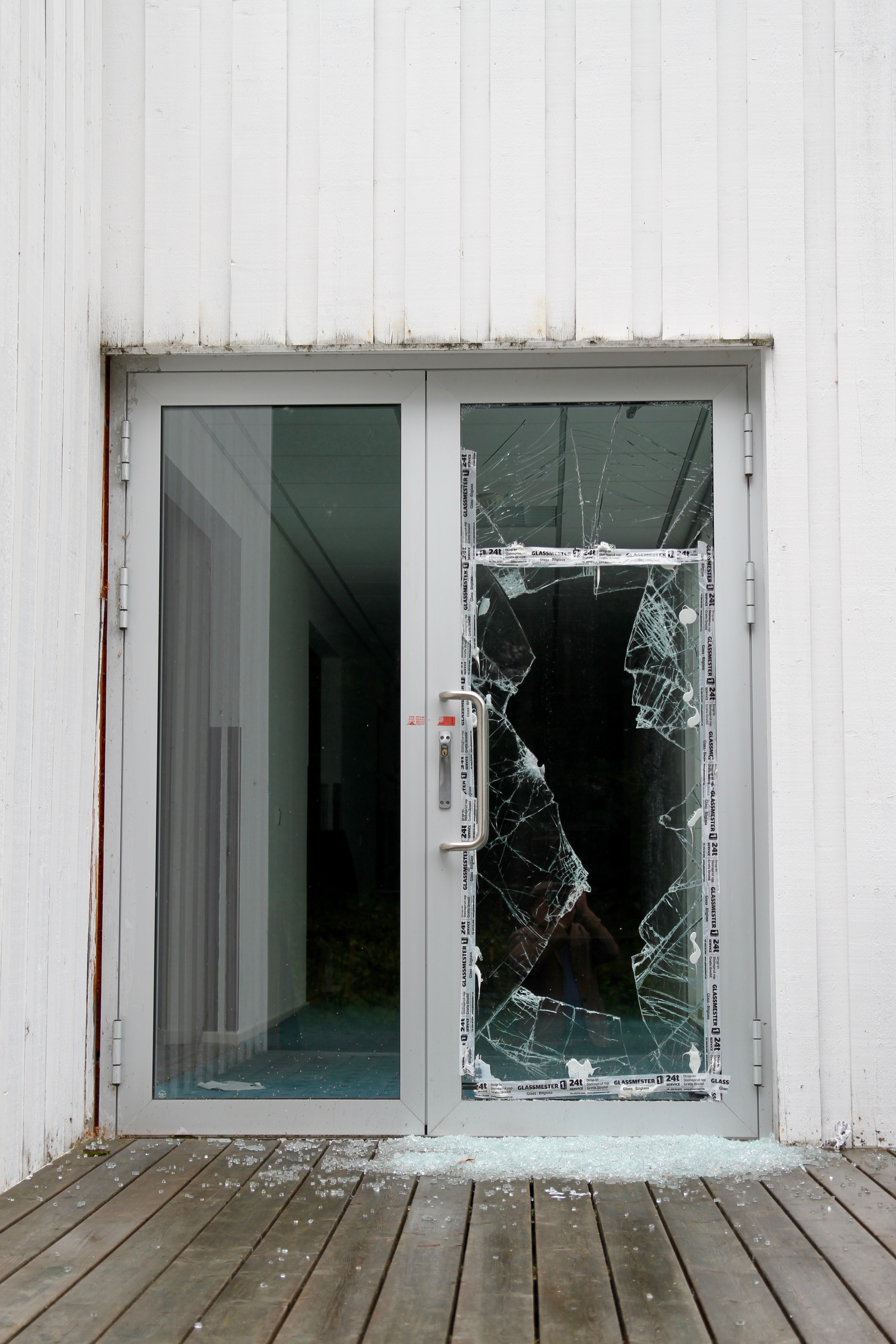
The door to the mosque after the shooting

In timing the attack, he waited until his stepmother had left the house. On the morning of 10 August 2019, once he knew she had left, he retrieved three guns from his father's gun cabinet: a 6.5×55mm Swedish Mauser 1896-38 rifle, a Baikal IJ-27E double-barreled shotgun, and a .22 long rifle Remington Model 572 Fieldmaster. He then loaded one of the rifles and walked into Ihle-Hansen's bedroom, before 3 p.m. After an initial misfire, he shot her three times in the chest and once in the head; she died instantly. He then returned to his room and prepared for the mosque attack.

Shortly before the mosque shooting, Manshaus posted a message on the imageboard EndChan. The message urged others to do the same, with Manshaus telling others to "bump the race war thread irl". The messages referred to Brenton Tarrant, the perpetrator of the Christchurch mosque shootings, as "saint tarrant", and said he was "elected" by him to commit the attack. Attached to the message was a meme depicting Tarrant, Patrick Crusius, and John Earnest as "chads". All three perpetrated racially motivated mass shootings in 2019. The post was made under his real name. The post also contained a link to an Imgur album with photos of himself, and a link to his Facebook profile with the livestream (with the aside that "stupid shit won’t work"). After making this post he drove to the mosque.

Manshaus brought with him to the mosque several weapons and a large quantity of ammunition, as well as body armor and a helmet. He also brought a computer and a phone which he used to attempt to live stream the shooting on Facebook with a GoPro camera attached to his helmet. He failed to connect them to the internet, so the attack was not livestreamed. When Manshaus entered the mosque, prayer had already ended and most had already left the building, with only three elderly members of the congregation inside. He shot his way through the locked door. He opened fire in the mosque, hitting no one.

One of the men, Mohammad Rafiq, approached the gunman and pinned him down, moving Manshaus's weapons away after he dropped them. During the scuffle with the perpetrator, Rafiq overpowered and disarmed him before he could attack anyone else in the mosque. He received minor injuries while the perpetrator tried to break free from a chokehold, including an attempt to gouge out Rafiq's left eye. Rafiq is a retired Pakistan Air Force officer who had moved to Bærum to be with his son in 2017. He was a frequent visitor to the Al-Noor Islamic Center. Another elder in the mosque, Mohamed Iqbal, hit the gunman on the head with his rifle to subdue him. Manshaus escaped from his grip 3 times, but was successfully recaptured. The police were called at 16:07 local time. Another worshipper, Irfan Mushtaq, came to the mosque and helped restrain Manshaus by tying his legs together using the imam's shawl.

== Investigation ==
Shortly after the shooting, Ihle-Hansen was found dead in their family home by police. A bomb and emergency squad both searched the house. It was reported that when the members of the mosque called the police, the incident was initially classified as low-priority and the police would not respond; the men struggled to convey the situation to the operator due to poor Norwegian language skills.

There were also claims that a user of an online forum had tried to notify the Norwegian Police Service three times that he suspected an attack would happen, but that local police told him to call the FBI. Police say they are aware of this allegation, but that they are not aware of any such call. The police response took a while, which resulted in criticism and accusations of racial profiling. A commission was set up to investigate the response, which concluded that it could have been done faster but the reasons for it were complicated.

== Legal proceedings ==
Manshaus was indicted for terrorism and murder. Police stated the day after the arrest that they were planning to give the perpetrator a mental health assessment. They also stated that they had no evidence that Manshaus was part of any terror network. The same day, in a court hearing in Oslo District Court, Manshaus was put in pre-trial jail for four weeks with no visitation, mail or media access. Manshaus declared himself not guilty and called for his release.

Prosecutors formally charged Manshaus with murder and terror on 17 February 2020. He later appeared in court on 7 May 2020, where he denied the charges. During the trial, he showed no remorse, saying that he wished he had caused more damage and regretted his lack of planning. Manshaus stated in court that he killed Ihle-Hansen because she was not ethnically Norwegian. During his sentencing, he said that he expected that he would be convicted and given a long sentence, but accused the judges of being complicit in "the genocide of the European people".

The prosecution called the murder of Ihle-Hansen an "outright execution" and said Manshaus showed "no mercy" in court, arguing for the maximum sentence of 21 years preventative detention (which means that he will be imprisoned indefinitely if he continues to be a threat to society). His defense attorney Unni Fries argued that he was mentally ill and of unsound mind; this was argued against Manshaus's wishes. She instead requested that Manshaus be deemed criminally insane and sentenced to compulsory mental care. The prosecution argued against this. Forensic psychiatrists disagreed with her assessment, though Ihle-Hansen's mother agreed. During the trial, the audio of his attack was played in court (though it had not connected to the internet, the attack was recorded by the GoPro).

Manshaus was found guilty of murder and terrorism on 11 June 2020. He was sentenced to 21 years preventative detention. Manshaus stated he would not appeal the charges, as he refused to recognize the Norwegian legal system. In addition to his sentence, Manshaus was ordered to compensate his victim's families and pay their legal fees of 100,000 NOK (~US$9,000).

=== Imprisonment ===
While imprisoned, Manshaus gave an interview in a documentary series about the case, Brennpunkt: Philips vei til terror, where he attributed his radicalization to the internet, stating:

There are a lot of different ways to get the views I have, which are quite different from the normal. Some people for example read books, for example Mein Kampf, or another fascist literary work, and then in a period of maybe 5–15 years come to a conclusion that things may not be as they were brought up to believe. Going through the process I did goes significantly faster. I only spent a year, maybe one and a half years, to get my view on society. And it really represents the impact the internet has. The internet is like a super-highway for ideas, in which ideas and opinions can be shared so fast, as we have never seen before [...] I can safely say that the main actor in my political upheaval was the internet.

It emerged during the 2022 parole hearing of Anders Behring Breivik, the perpetrator of the 22/7 July attacks in Norway, that Breivik's lawyer wished for Breivik to serve his sentence with a cellmate. Breivik's lawyer requested that Manshaus be his cellmate, as he believed they would not harm each other.

=== Reopening of case; trial in 2025 ===
Manshaus's brother killed himself in 2023; shortly after, Manshaus was admitted to a psychiatric ward due to severe psychosis. As a result, his lawyer asked for the criminal case to be reopened, filing a petition to the Criminal Cases Review Commission, as this, in her view, raised significant doubt as to whether he had been sane when he committed the shooting. According to his lawyer, he had become physically aggressive in prison, shouting that God was speaking to him through other inmates. He had delusions where he believed that he was the reincarnation of Anders Behring Breivik, was the antichrist, and had authored the Bible. The victims' counsel advised against this, arguing that political extremism should not be viewed a sign of mental illness.

The petition was accepted, and the case was re-opened March 2024. Experts assessed that he had been psychotic at the time of the crime, and that had this information been available when he was sentenced he would have been instead sentenced to compulsory mental health care. His defense lawyer stated that after he had received mental health care Manshaus distanced himself from his previous beliefs, and that when he was not psychotic he was aware his ideas were a result of mental illness. The commission dealing with his case agreed unanimously, and it was then sent to the court of appeal. The report stated Manshaus had possibly had a "serious disorder" as far back as 2017.

As of 11 September 2025, the defendant is on trial; he has not finished his testimony. In October 2025, Manshaus was resentenced by the court to 21 years in prison with no extended detention. The court's verdict was unanimous; they cited his abandonment of his neo-Nazi views and lack of prior serious crimes as additional rationales.

== Aftermath ==
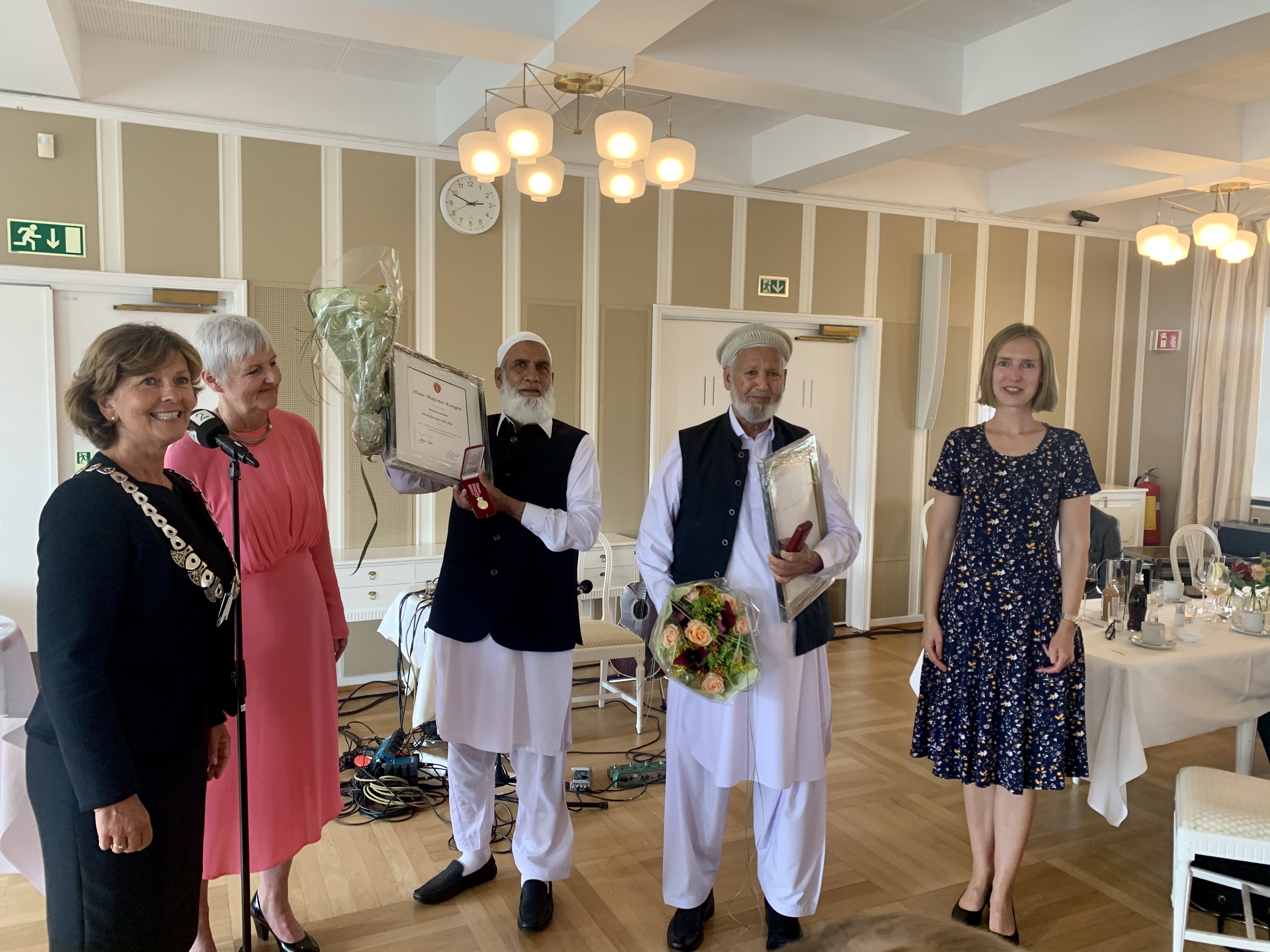
Rafiq and Iqbal receiving their medals

In early reporting on the attack, the murder of his sister was downplayed, with the event mostly being referred to as a failed terrorist attack or mosque shooting. It was initially uncertain why she had been killed, with some papers speculating that she had attempted to stop his plan, though it came out in September that she had been killed over her race. After her murder, there was increased media attention paid to the status of international adoptees in Norway, which were noted as an "invisible minority" group.

Authorities reported that security in Norway would be increased after the attack, as it occurred during the Muslim holiday of Eid al-Adha, with the Prime Minister raising the national security the following day. The Al-Noor Islamic Centre had already added extra security after the Christchurch mosque shootings. According to local media, the mosque said that security would be improved again. EndChan deleted the thread that Manshaus created, and had its primary web domain taken offline following the attack.

The mosque shooting reignited the debate over right-wing extremism and Islamophobia in Norway. The Prime Minister, Erna Solberg, condemned the attack. Solberg and Abid Raja, a Liberal Norwegian politician, spoke together on the day of the attack, assuring the public that places of worship should be safe and calling for plans to break down Islamophobia in the country. Criticism of the right-wing Progress Party's rhetoric resurged after the shooting, due in part to their usage of the phrase snikislamisering (transl. creeping Islamization). Siv Jensen, the leader of the party referred to Rafiq as a hero, but in the aftermath of the shooting again referred to "creeping Islamization". After the shooting, Oslo City Council Leader Raymond Johansen tied the attack to the phrase, criticizing the party for their use of it, with the criticism being echoed by others in later months, including by Raja. Progress Party politician Jon Helgheim instead criticised the term "islamophobia" itself, as a constructed concept.

The day after the attack, on the Eid-ul-Adha celebration day, Eid-ul-Adha prayer was led by Imam Al-Sheikh Syed Muhammad Ashraf (Imam Al-Noor Islamic Senter) at the Ton hotel in Sandvika. Prime minister Solberg and other important official figures, as well as a large number of the Muslims attended an Eid Prayer held in Sandvika together with other religious leaders and community members present to show their solidarity. As news of the shooting spread in the media, so did the actions of Rafiq and the other men in the mosque, which a Danish newspaper described as "courageous"; several media outlets described Rafiq as a "hero". Beate Gangås, the Oslo Police Commander-in-Chief, and Lisbeth Hammer Krogh, the mayor of Bærum. A local philanthropist, Elisabeth Norheim, started a fundraising campaign to help raise money so Rafiq and the other man who helped subdue the attack could undertake the hajj. After the initial goal of 55,000 NOK (~US$6100) for the cost of the two to travel was surpassed, with more than 180,000 NOK (~US$20,000) raised in one day, the organizers said they could also fund the hajj for the third man in the mosque during the attack.

In 2021, journalist Anders Hammer created a docuseries for the Norwegian television program Brennpunkt, Philips vei til terror (transl. Philip's path to terror). In 2022, he wrote Terroristen fra Bærum: Radikaliseringen av Philip Manshaus (transl. Terrorist from Bærum: The Radicalization of Philip Manshaus). This book is based on most of the same materials as the docuseries. In researching for both he personally interviewed Manshaus, but did not get much information out of it. The same year, journalist Anne Bitsch wrote Den norske skyld: En beretning fra rettssaken mot Philip Manshaus (transl. Norwegian Guilt: An Account of the Trial of Philip Manshaus), which discusses what responsibility the wider society has for Manshaus's crimes.

The attack was one of several far-right attacks that were influenced by each other in this period, particularly Christchurch shooting copycat attacks, with Manshaus referencing other perpetrators in his announcement message. Manshaus himself was referenced in the writings of Payton Gendron, the perpetrator of the 2022 Buffalo shooting, who also wrote his name on one of the guns used in the attack.

In 2025, a 34-year-old Norwegian–Ethiopian Muslim woman, was killed in a racist and Islamophobia-motivated murder on 24 August 2025 in Oslo, Norway. The murder took place at a child welfare centre. The suspect stated that he was inspired by Brenton Tarrant, Anders Breivik and Manshaus.
