= Hans Jørgen Lysglimt Johansen =

Norwegian politician

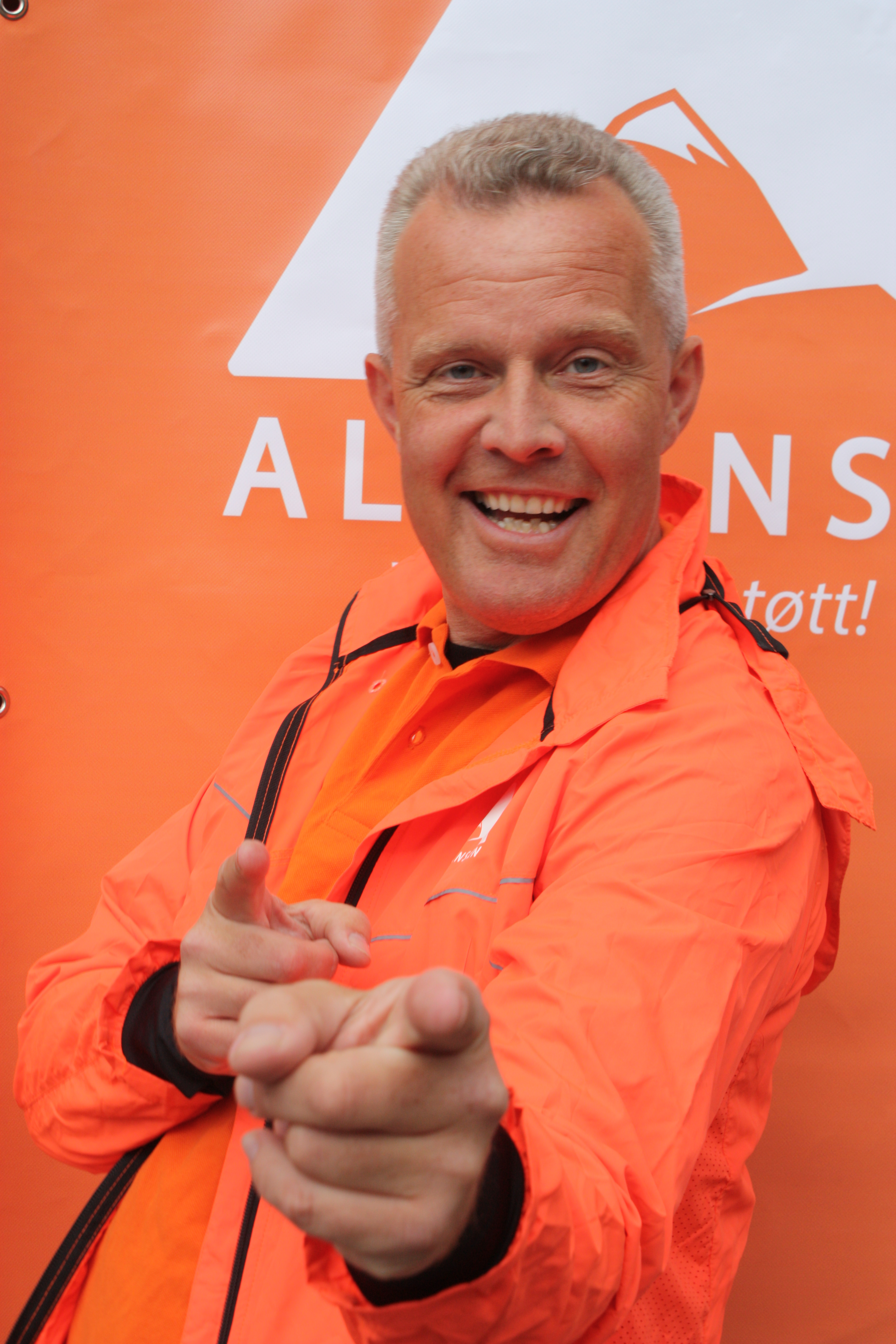
- Johansen in 2017
- Born: Hans Jørgen Johansen; 13 September 1971 (age 54)
- Political party: Alliance - Alternative for Norway

Hans Jørgen Lysglimt Johansen (born 13 September 1971) is a Norwegian economist and political activist who is the leader of the party Alliance - Alternative for Norway. He is known for his neo-Nazi rhetoric, which features regular racist and antisemitic statements.

== Background ==
Johansen has a degree in economics from Lund University in Sweden, where he studied from 1990 to 1996. He then worked in the mining industry in the Philippines until 1997. From 2000 to 2003, Lysglimt Johansen was the leader of the FRI Democrats, a politically independent, liberal organization that became formed after the Bolkesjø process in the Progress Party in 1994.

Johansen became known in the Norwegian mass media as a supporter of the Republican candidate Donald Trump during the US presidential election campaign in 2016.

He has since received attention for numerous statements that have been described as racist, including Holocaust denial and attacks on Jews, which have been monitored by the police. He has otherwise stated his support for the manifesto of 2011 Norway attacks terrorist Anders Behring Breivik, describing the attacks as "karma" for the Labour Party, also supporting Apartheid in South Africa, the stab-in-the-back myth and the idea of the Aryan race. He maintains friendly relations with the Nordic Resistance Movement and welcomes their members as candidates for his party.

Johansen has also posed in a selfie with British politician Jeremy Corbyn, but Corbyn distanced himself from Johansen's politics when he learnt of his identity.

In July 2024, Johansen was convicted of hate speech, reckless conduct and fraud. He was subsequently sentenced to seven months in prison. He has appealed his sentence and has therefore not begun serving it.
