= Terrorism in Norway =

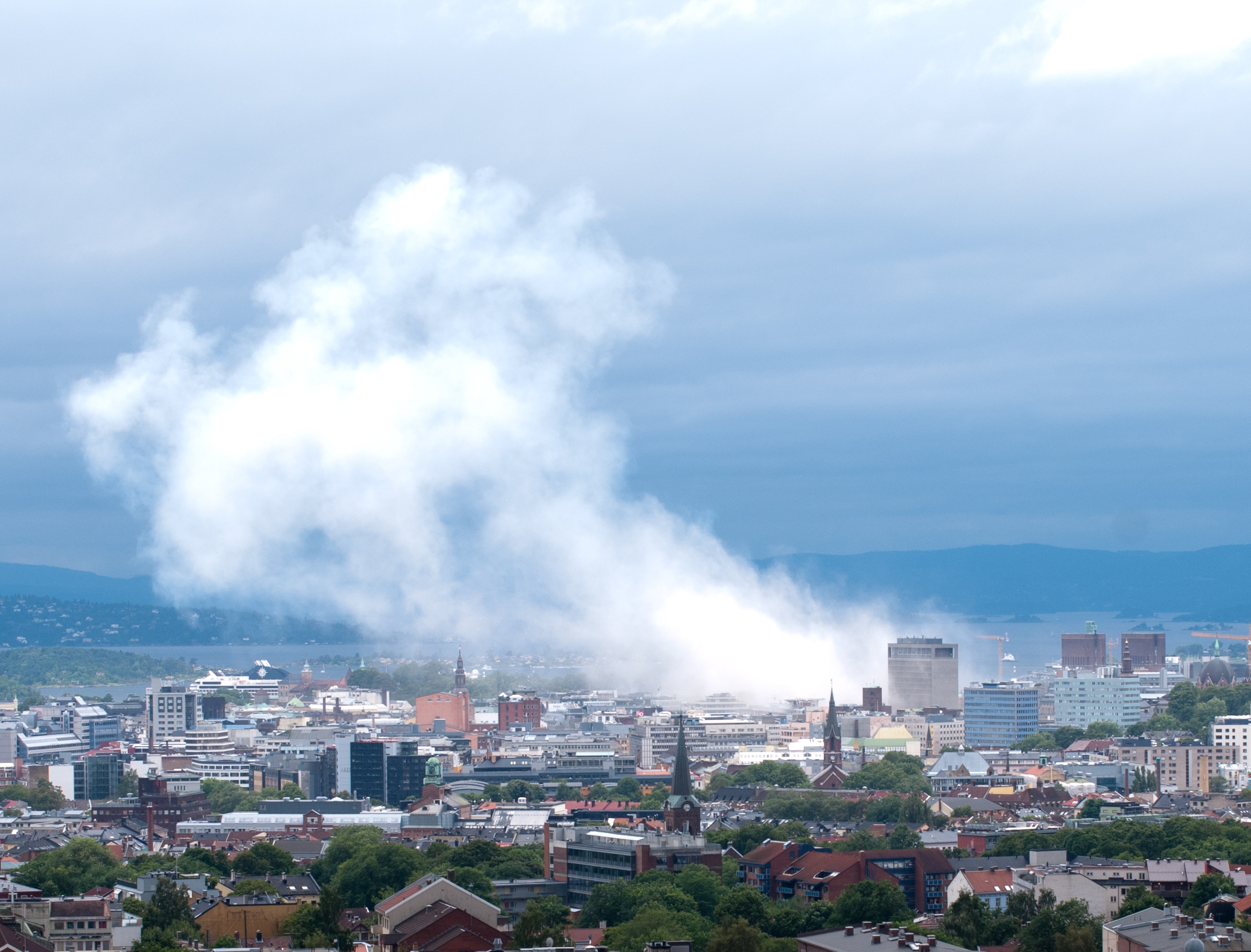
The aftermath of the 2011 Norway attacks

Terrorism in Norway includes a list of major terrorist incidents where organized groups and lone wolves have tried carrying out attacks. In recent years, there has been a rise mostly of Islamic extremism and far-right violence and various groups have been suspected of terrorism plots.

The Norwegian Police Security Service are closely monitoring Islamist and far-right groups in Eastern Norway.

== 21st century ==
The right-wing terrorist Philip Manshaus who was behind the Bærum mosque shooting in August 2019, admitted to have been in contact with the Nordic Resistance Movement prior to the attack, but was never accepted as a member.

In November 2020, the Norwegian Police Security Service (PST) made an announcement about the general terrorist threat against Norway as moderate. The background for this was the 2020 Nice stabbing and 2020 Vienna attack. The Norwegian police considered it possible that someone would try to carry out terrorist acts in Norway, motivated by Islamist motives. The development in both France and Austria with the republishing of the Jyllands-Posten Muhammad cartoons controversy, and the debate this creates in Norway, may also help inspiring people to commit acts of terrorism. The police was temporarily armed for three weeks, but the arming was prolonged.

== List of terrorist incidents in Norway ==
| Date | Type | Dead | Injured | Details | Perpetrator |
|---|---|---|---|---|---|
| 1965 | Bombings | 0 | 0 | Several people were hurt by hand grenades and dynamite in Oslo by a lone wolf extremist. | Lone Wolf |
| 1973 | Attempted terror plot | 0 | 0 | A Palestinian terrorist group was present in Norway during the 1973 oil crisis, ready to strike against an oil refinery outside of Tønsberg. The Norwegian police mobilized nationwide after revealing the plot, causing the group to withdraw (the group instead attacked an oil installation in Singapore). | Palestinian nationalists |
| 1976 | Attempted terror plot | 0 | 0 | In Stortorvet, two Mexican brothers were arrested, suspected to create a left-wing terrorist organisation in Europe. They were later arrested in Denmark and Sweden for terrorist offences, including a plan to kidnap Sweden's labour minister Anna-Greta Leijon. Eventually they were both expelled to Mexico and Cuba. | Tomas and Jaime Okusono Martinez |
| 1977 | Bombing | 0 | 0 | A bookstore in Tromsø belonging to the Workers' Communist Party was severely damaged by a powerful bomb containing 10 kg of dynamite. Two people narrowly avoided death as they left the room shortly before the explosion. | Right-wing extremists (suspected) |
| 1 May 1979 | Bombing | 0 | 2 | A far-right political activist launched a bomb attack against a May Day workers parade in Oslo. | Petter Kristian Kyvik |
| 2 July 1982 | Bombing | 1 | 11 | Oslo Central Station bombing: A bomb attack on the central train station of Oslo, killed one person and injured 11 others. An unnamed 18-year-old man was convicted, claiming he had extorted the Norwegian State Railways. | Lone Wolf |
| 1984 | Bombing | 0 | 0 | The telecommunications bunker in Frogner Park was bombed and completely destroyed. Right-wing extremists were suspected to be behind the bomb attack. The Norwegian authorities hid this from the public for a whole year as the telephone exchange contained equipment related to NATO. | Right-wing extremists (suspected) |
| 1985 | Bombing | 0 | 1 | In 1985 the Ahmadiyya Muslim Nor mosque in Frogner in Oslo was blasted with dynamite. A 38-year-old woman received minor injuries. The bomb was detonated by an activist from the National People's Party, which resulted in several other people from the party being arrested by the police. The arrested perpetrators were also accused of bombing the Frogner Park telephone exchange in 1984 (see above). | Right-wing extremists |
| 1988 | Attempted bombing | 0 | 0 | A time bomb made of 5 kilograms (11 lb) of dynamite was discovered at an asylum centre in Evje. Right-wing extremists were suspected to be behind the planned attack. | Right-wing extremists (suspected) |
| 11 October 1993 | Shooting, assassination attempt | 0 | 1 | In 1993 Aschehoug chief William Nygaard was shot three times in the back but survived. The attack is believed to be a result of Nygaard publishing and defending Salman Rushdie's controversial novel The Satanic Verses. The Norwegian newspaper editor Harald Stanghelle characterized the assassination as state terrorism. In 2018 PST charged two people for attempted murder or conspiracy of murder, and in 2021 it was revealed by the Norwegian Broadcasting Corporation that one of the suspected terrorists lives in Beirut, Lebanon named Khaled Moussawi. | Khaled Moussawi (suspected) |
| 21 August 1994 | Bombing | 0 | 0 | On the night of 21st of August a right-wing extremist was suspected of a bomb attack against the Blitz house. No one was injured in the attack, but many windows in the neighbourhood were broken. The former neo-Nazi Johnny Olsen claimed that he was the one behind the attack. | Johnny Olsen |
| 2003 | Bombing | 0 | 0 | A power charged dynamite exploded outside the Word of Truth church in Slemmestad. No one was killed or injured in the blast. Serious damage was made to the building and its surroundings. | Religious Militants (suspected) |
| July 2006 | Shooting, assassination attempt | 0 | 0 | In July 2006 Arfan Bhatti was charged but not convicted for shots fired against the home of journalist Nina Johnsrud of the newspaper Dagsavisen. | Arfan Bhatti |
| 2009 | Attempted terror plot | 0 | 0 | In 2009 the Norwegian Police Security Service actioned against 25 Islamists thought to have planned terror in Norway. | Islamists |
| 2010 | Attempted terror plot | 0 | 0 | Islamist Mullah Krekar threatened to kill the prime minister of Norway Erna Solberg during a news conference in June 2010. On July 12, 2011, terrorism charges were filed against him. | Mulla Krekar |
| 2010 | Attempted terror plot | 0 | 0 | 2010 Norway terror plot: Three Islamists were arrested and later convicted of terror plans. | Al-Qaeda (suspected) |
| 22 July 2011 | Shooting, bombing | 77 | 319 | 2011 Norway attacks: 77 people were killed and at least 319 injured in two sequential attacks by Anders Behring Breivik. | Anders Behring Breivik |
| 24 July 2014 | Attempted terror plot | 0 | 0 | 2014 Norway terror threat: Terror threats made by Jihadists from the Islamic State of Iraq and the Levant (ISIL) caused extraordinary short-term security measures in Norway. | Islamic State of Iraq and the Levant |
| 8 April 2017 | Attempted bombing | 0 | 0 | On 8 April 2017, in the aftermath of the 2017 Stockholm truck attack, a man was arrested in a part of Grønland district of Oslo closed off by police after a "bomb-like" device was found. The device was later demolished in a controlled explosion. The man, a 17-year-old Russian citizen, was charged on 9 April with illegal possession of an explosive device. The man arrived in Norway as an asylum seeker in 2010, and was known to the Norwegian Police Security Service (PST) for having expressed support for the Islamic State of Iraq and the Levant. | Islamic State (suspected) |
| 5 December 2018 | Attempted mail bombing | 0 | 0 | A 43-year-old man was sentenced to twelve years in jail for attempted terrorism, including mail bombing and three attempted murders, after he in 2018 sent a letter bomb to the police station in the centre of Ski. When the letters were opened, a police officer became suspicious. The bomb squad arrived quickly at the scene, where they neutralized the object. No one was killed or injured at the scene of the incident. | Right-wing extremist (suspected) |
| 10 August 2019 | Shooting | 1 | 1 (+1) | Bærum mosque shooting: A lone gunman Philip Manshaus opened fire in a mosque in Bærum, Norway, 20 kilometers outside of Oslo. He injured one person and at the time of the shooting there were three other people in the mosque. On 11 June 2020, Manshaus was found guilty of murder and terrorism and sentenced to 21 years in prison along with a provision that he should be imprisoned indefinitely if determined to be a threat to society. | Philip Manshaus |
| 4 February 2021 | Attempted terror plot | 0 | 0 | The Norwegian Police Security Service arrested a 16-year-old Syrian male in Oslo the 4th of February, charged with preparation for an act of terrorism. The young man was held in custody and is not a Norwegian citizen. According to news media, Norwegian Police Security Service believes that the 16-year-old is a Jihadist and an Islamic State of Iraq and the Levant sympathizer and was planning to use poison to attack random civilians. | Islamic State of Iraq and the Levant (suspected) |
| 25 June 2022 | Shooting | 2 | 21 | 2022 Oslo shooting: A 42-year-old Kurdish man opened fire at guests at the London Pub LGBTQ nightclub in downtown Oslo along with two other locations nearby. The perpetrator was later detained by the Norwegian Police and it was then revealed that the man became radicalized in 2015 and was in contact with Arfan Bhatti a well-known Islamist extremist. He was charged with murder and acts of terrorism. | Zaniar Matapour |
| 23 September 2024 | Attempted terror plot | 0 | 0 | A 53-year-old man was arrested for making terror threats and leaving his rucksack with an explosive device in front of a NAV office in Åsane, Bergen. | Lone wolf (suspected) |
| 24 August 2025 | Stabbing | 1 | 0 | Murder of Tamima Nibras Juhar: An 18-year-old Norwegian man with German background was arrested for killing a 34-year-old female welfare worker at an institution in Oslo, Norway. The Norwegian Police treated it as terrorism with a right-wing extremist motive. The perpetrator had expressed Islamophobic views. | Djordje Wilms |
| 8 March 2026 | Bombing | 0 | 0 | 2026 bombing of the United States Embassy in Oslo: The incident occurred during the night of 8 March 2026, when a bomb detonated at the consular entrance of the United States Embassy in Oslo. The explosion caused material damage to the building, but no people were injured in the incident. The Norwegian Police suspects foreign state terrorism linked to the 2026 Iran war and arrested three brothers from Iraq. | Kata'ib Hezbollah (suspected) |

== See also ==
- Terrorism in Europe
- Islamic terrorism in Europe
- List of terrorist incidents
- Terrorism in the United States
- Hindu terrorism
  - Violence against Christians in India
- Left-wing terrorism
- Right-wing terrorism
- Souhaila Andrawes
- Mullah Krekar
- Abdul Rauf Mohammad
- Hassan Abdi Dhuhulow
