= Galgeberg =

Neighbourhood of Gamle Oslo in Norway

Coordinates: 59°54′28″N 10°46′49″E

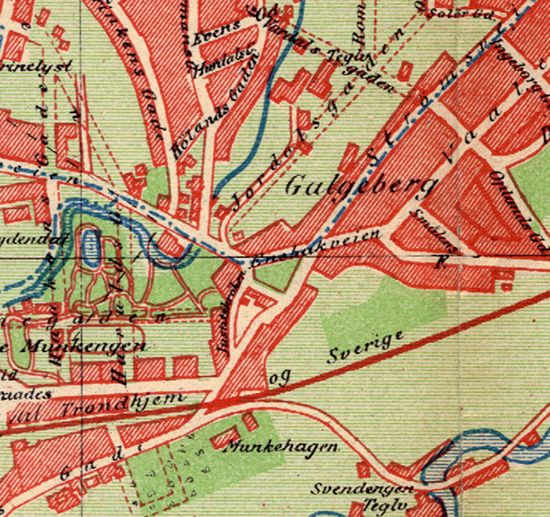
Map from c.1900

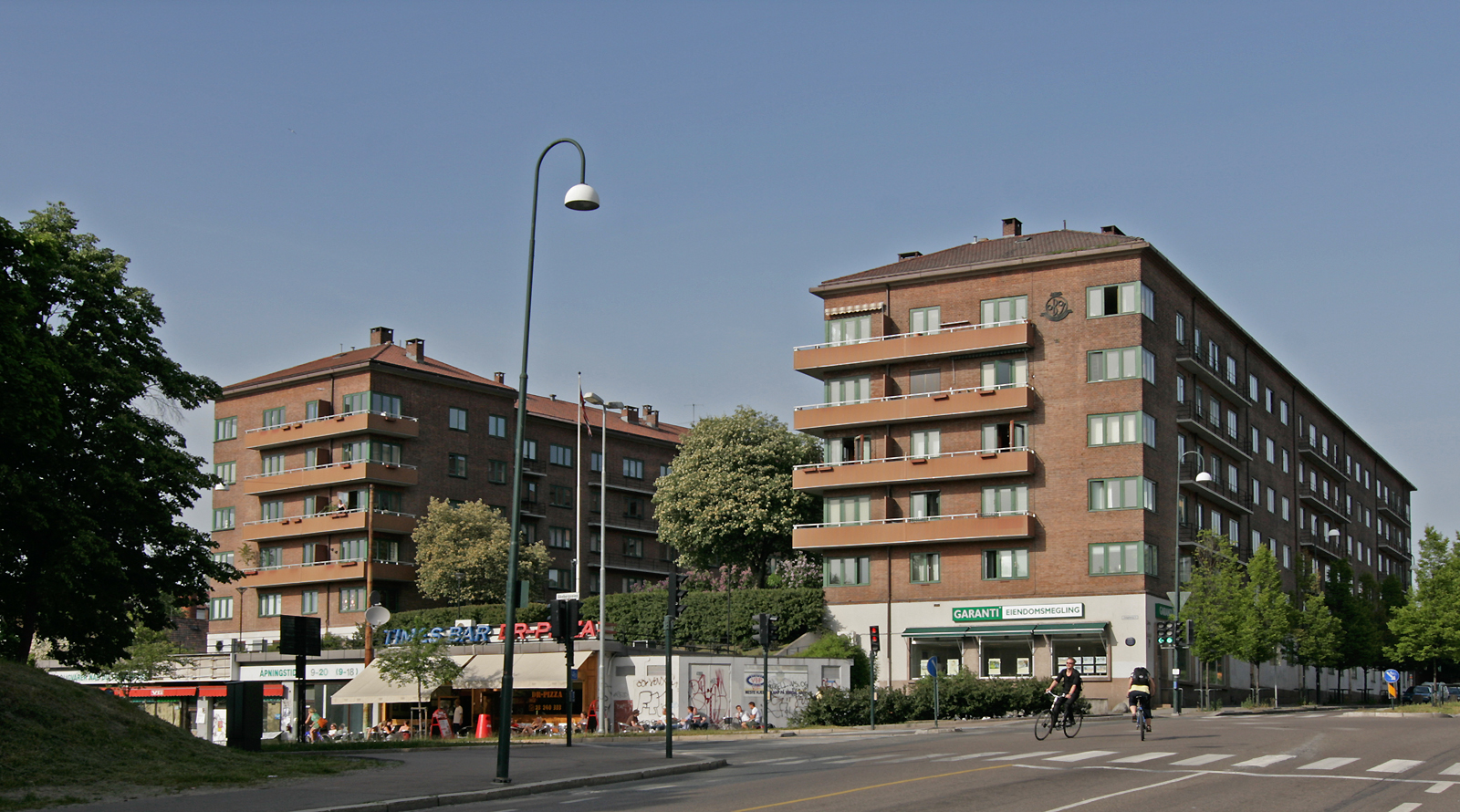
Housing in the street named Galgeberg

Galgeberg (Norwegian pronunciation: [ˈɡɑ̂ɽjəbær(ɡ)]) is a neighbourhood in the borough of Gamle Oslo in Oslo, Norway.

The neighbourhood lies near Vålerenga, Kampen and Gamlebyen. The name stems from the gallows present at the location in earlier times.
