= Killing of Tamima Nibras Juhar =

2025 terrorist attack in Oslo, Norway

- Location: 59.914°N 10.779°E; Kampen, Oslo, Norway
- Date: 25 August 2025; 14 months ago c.1:15 a.m. (CET)
- Attack type: Stabbing
- Weapon: Knife
- Deaths: 1
- Victim: Tamima Nibras Juhar
- Perpetrator: Djordje (Đorđe) Wilms
- Motive: Islamophobia inspired by far-right extremism
- Charges: Murder with terrorist intent
- Convictions: Murder

Tamima Nibras Juhar was a 34-year-old Norwegian–Ethiopian Muslim woman, who was killed in a racist and islamophobia-motivated murder on 24 August 2025 in Oslo, Norway. The murder took place at a child welfare centre.

The perpetrator, an 18-year-old man who immigrated from Serbia to Norway as a child, was convicted of murder in June 2026 and sentenced to 19 years imprisonment.

== Attack ==
On 24 August 2025, Tamima Juhar was stabbed to death while she was working at a child welfare centre in Kampen, Oslo. Police were called to the scene by a neighbour at around 1:15 a.m, where Juhar was pronounced dead at the scene. She suffered extensive stab wounds in various areas of her body. The prosecutor refused to release details about the attack. A few hours later, police arrested the suspect and seized the knife used in the attack.

Juhar had earlier stated that she was afraid to go to work because of the attacker and had notified the workplace about him.

== Aftermath ==
A makeshift memorial with flowers and candles was made to remember Juhar. A yellow rose procession was organized on Sunday the 31st of August under the auspices of the Norwegian Centre Against Racism in consultation with family and friends.

== Victim ==
Tamima Nibras Juhar was born in 1991 in Ethiopia into an Oromo family. She came to Norway at age thirteen in spring 2004, though this was first misreported as 2008. She grew up in the Frydenberg youth home in Oslo's Hasle neighbourhood. Juhar became involved with the Morradi Scene artist project and co-founded the ID-prosjektet, meant to ease the contact between struggling youths and support agencies, in 2011, later helping in the establishment of the UngArena, a mental health and substance abuse counselling centre.

Juhar worked as an apprentice teacher at a kindergarten between 2016 and 2019 before becoming a social worker. She primarily ran her own care and nursing service but also worked contractually with the child welfare organisation Gemt. At the time of her death, Juhar was enrolled at MF Norwegian School of Theology, Religion and Society for conflict and peace studies.

== Suspect ==
Eighteen-year-old Djordje (Serbian: Đorđe) Wilms, a resident of the welfare centre, was arrested in connection to the murder shortly after. He confessed to killing Juhar, saying it was politically motivated and because she was an immigrant with a Muslim background. Wilms was ordered to be held in custody for at least four weeks, with the first two being in isolation. He requested to have his court hearing be open to the public to "express his views" but was denied out of fear that he would abuse the hearing.

Wilms was born in Germany to both German and Serbian parents, and immigrated from Serbia to Oslo as a child. Since then, he lived elsewhere in Eastern Norway, where he was active in a local hunting and fishing club. Wilms lived in a foster home for several years before moving to Kampen in March 2024. In February of the same year, the Norwegian Police Security Service received a tip about Wilms, causing him to be put in a group they consider to be right-wing extremists, but with a low threat level. In 2025, a routine inspection of the threat level in January and another tip in April did not affect the PST's rating of Wilms, but he was voluntarily questioned on 3 June.

Wilms has admitted that he had plans to attack mosques in Oslo and was on a Telegram channel affiliated with far-right political party Alliance where he supported the party and wrote about his hatred for the government, Islam and immigrants. Employees at the child welfare center reported concerning behavior from Wilms, including Nazi statements. On 24 December 2024, Wilms threatened a child welfare worker via SMS, which stated "I will slaughter you just like the Jews". The message was reported to Oslo Police District in February 2025, which reviewed the case on 14 March and judged it as non-urgent, though notifying PST about the report in April. It was since being processed at the Conflict Council for Youth Follow-Up. After Juhar's murder, the case was put with Grønland police station.

In April 2026, Wilms was indicted for murder. Although investigators confirmed through interrogation of Wilms that he held far-right extremist beliefs and targeted Juhar for her religion and skin colour, the terrorism charge was dropped as political extremism of a perpetrator alone was not sufficient to consider the crime terrorism, though still a hate crime. His trial began on 1 June 2026 and during his testimony in Oslo District Court, Wilms stated that he was inspired by Brenton Tarrant, Anders Breivik and Philip Manshaus. He voiced regret for the crime, but the court found the explanation inauthentic. On 30 June, Wilms was found guilty and sentenced to 19 years in prison with preventive detention, with possible parole after 12 years. The preventive detention was ruled due to a psychiatric exam finding that Wilms posed a substantial risk due to his "fascination with violence, lack of empathy, [and] antisocial personality traits".

== See also ==
- 2019 Bærum murder and mosque attack
- Murder of Benjamin Hermansen
- National Socialist Underground
- Alternative for Germany
