= Alliance (Norway) =

Political party

Alliance – Alternative for Norway Alliansen – Alternativ for Norge
- Abbreviation: A
- Leader: Hans Jørgen Lysglimt Johansen
- Founder: Hans Jørgen Lysglimt Johansen
- Founded: 22 November 2016
- Registered: 5 January 2017
- Youth wing: Alliansenungdommen
- Ideology: Ultranationalism; Alt-right; Neo-Nazism
- Political position: Far-right
- Colours: Orange
- Slogan: Norge først
- Storting: 0 / 169

Website
- stemalliansen.no

The Alliance – Alternative for Norway (Norwegian: Alliansen – Alternativ for Norge) is a political party in Norway. It was founded on 22 November 2016 and inscribed in the Party Register by Hans Jørgen Lysglimt Johansen on 5 January 2017.

== History ==
In 2016, Hans Jørgen Lysglimt Johansen profiled himself as a Donald Trump supporter. A party initiative with the same name was earlier this autumn initiated by Mikkel Dobloug where Christian Tybring-Gjedde was intended as leader.

== Ideology ==
The Alliance has formed a largely online neo-Nazi network, largely of teenagers who post memes and internet trolling with racist and antisemitic messages on platforms such as Discord. The party's leader is known for a number of grossly antisemitic statements and has friendly contacts with the Nordic Resistance Movement.

According to Lysglimt Johansen, the main issue for the Alliance is to get Norway out of the EEA and Schengen agreements with the EU. The party is also concerned about stopping immigration as well as changes in the democratic system.

The Alliance has been criticized for repeatedly expressing xenophobia and racist attitudes. A number of prominent politicians across the political spectrum from Progress Party to Red have publicly declared their opposition to the Alliance.

The Alliance does not have a traditional party program. The party is based on nationalist ideas and slogans such as "Norway first!". Opposition to immigration appears from the party's statements to be essential alongside national sovereignty. Carline Tromp writes that the Alliance's rhetoric is reminiscent of the alt-right and MAGA movement in the United States.

The young man who killed Tamima Nibras Juhar was in a Telegram channel affiliated with the Alliance where he supported the party and wrote about his hatred for the government, Islam and immigrants.

== Election results ==
Election	Votes	%	Seats	+/–
2017	3,311	0.1 #16	0 / 169	0
2021	2,489	0.1 #19	0 / 169	0
